= 2008 in jazz =

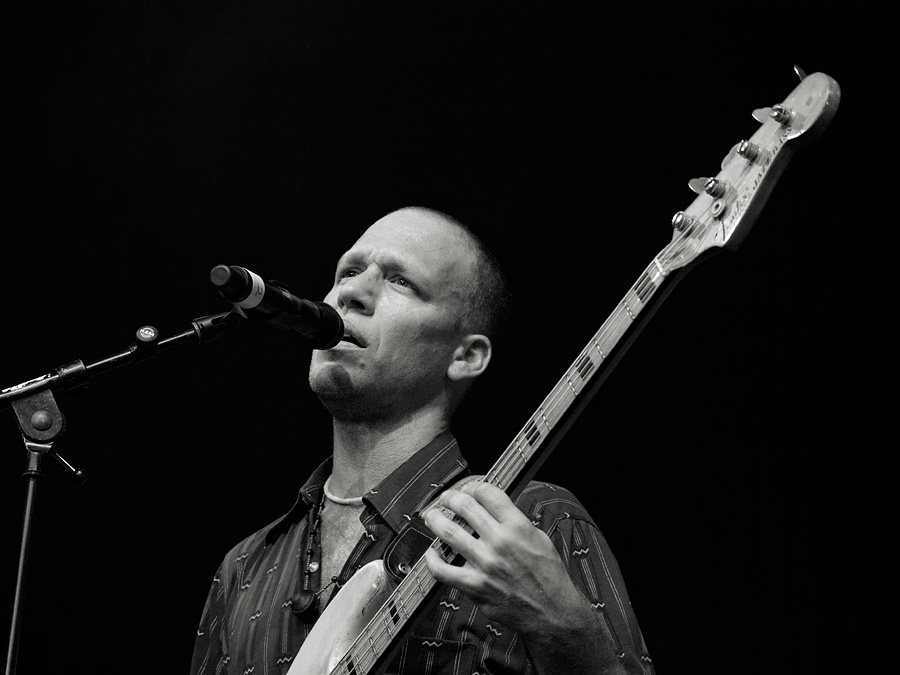
- Avishai Cohen at Moers Festival 2008.
- Decade: 2000s in jazz
- Music: 2008 in music
- Standards: List of jazz standards
- See also: 2007 in jazz – 2009 in jazz

This is a timeline documenting events of Jazz in the year 2008.

== Events ==
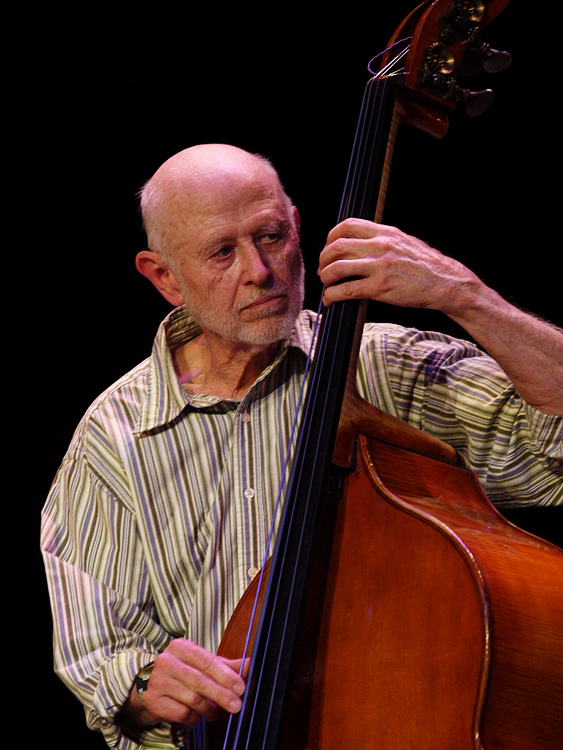
Barre Phillipsat the 2008 Moers Festival.

=== January ===
- 30 – The 11th Polarjazz Festival started in Longyearbyen, Svalbard (January 30 – February 2).

=== February ===
- 21 – The 3rd Ice Music Festival Festival started in Geilo, Norway (February 21–24).

=== March ===
- 7 – The 4th Jakarta International Java Jazz Festival started in Jakarta, Indonesia (March 7–9).
- 11 – Jazz musician and broadcaster Humphrey Lyttelton announces his retirement from presenting BBC Radio 2's jazz programme after forty years.
- 14
  - The 35th Vossajazz started at Voss, Norway (March 14–16).
  - Mads Berven was awarded Vossajazzprisen 2008.
- 19 – Tord Gustavsen performs the commissioned work Restar av lukke – bitar av tru for Vossajazz 2008.
- 31 – theJazz radio station stops broadcasting.

=== April ===
- 18
  - The International Association for Jazz Education (IAJE) ceased daily operations and filed for bankruptcy under Chapter 7 of the United States Federal Bankruptcy Law, ending 40 years of service.
- 24 – The 14th SoddJazz started in Inderøy, Norway (April 24–28).

=== May ===
- 9 – The 37th Moers Festival started in Moers, Germany (May 9 – 12).
- 21 – The 36th Nattjazz started in Bergen, Norway (May 21 – 31).

=== June ===
- 26 – The 28th Montreal International Jazz Festival started in Montreal, Quebec, Canada (June 26 - July 6).
- 27 – The 20th Jazz Fest Wien started in Vienna, Austria (June 27 – July 17).
- 29
  - The first annual International Jazz Awards, a global 2 hour television special celebrating over 100 years of Jazz music, took place at the Beverly Hilton Hotel in Beverly Hills, California.

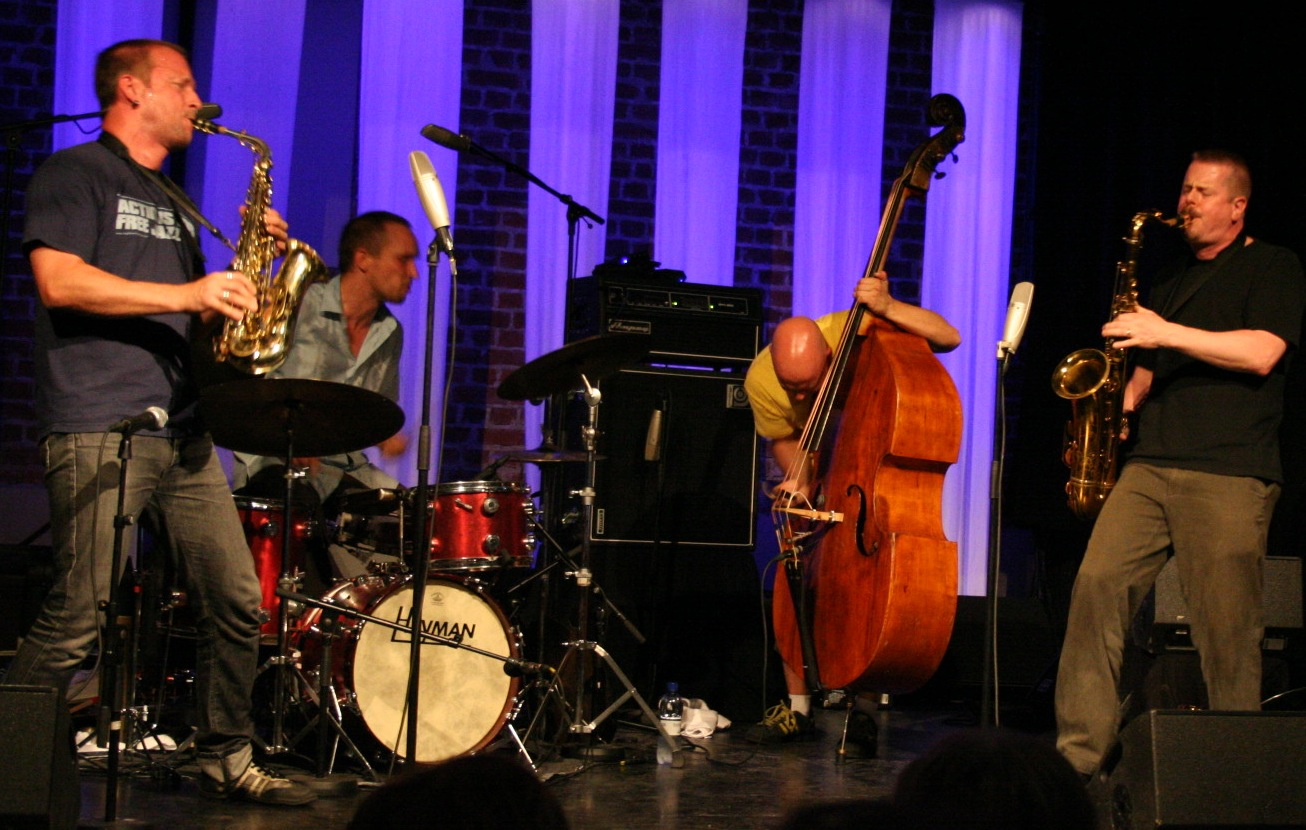
Norwegian/Swedish free jazz trio The Thing plays with Ken Vandermark at Kongsberg Jazzfestival, Norway 2008. From the left is Mats Gustafsson (Sweden), Paal Nilssen-Love (Norway), Ingebrigt Håker Flaten (Norway), and Ken Vandermark (Sweden).

=== July ===
- 2 – The 44th Kongsberg Jazzfestival started in Kongsberg, Norway (July 2 – 5).
- 4
  - The 30th Copenhagen Jazz Festival started in Copenhagen, Denmark (July 4 – 13).
  - The 42nd Montreux Jazz Festival started in Montreux, Switzerland (July 4 – 19).
- 11 – The 33rd North Sea Jazz Festival started in The Hague, Netherlands (July 11 – 13).
- 14
  - The 48th Moldejazz started in Molde, Norway (July 14 – 19).
  - The 43rd Pori Jazz Festival started in Pori, Finland (July 14 – 20).
- 16 – The 25th Stockholm Jazz Festival started in Stockholm, Sweden (July 16 – 19).
- 19 – The 61st Nice Jazz Festival started in Nice, France (July 19 – 25).
- 22 – The 43rd San Sebastian Jazz Festival started in San Sebastian, Spain (July 22 – 27).

=== August ===
- 6 – The 22nd Sildajazz started in Haugesund, Norway (August 6 – 10).
- 8
  - The 52ndd Newport Jazz Festival started in Newport, Rhode Island (August 8 – 10).
  - The 24th Brecon Jazz Festival started in Brecon, Wales (August 8 – 10).
- 11 – The 23rd Oslo Jazzfestival started in Oslo, Norway (August 11 – 16).

=== September ===
- 4 – The 4th Punktfestivalen started in Kristiansand, Norway (September 4 – 6).
- 19 – The 51st Monterey Jazz Festival started in Monterey, California (September 19 – 21).

=== November ===
- 14 – The 17th London Jazz Festival started in England (November 14 – 23).

== Album released ==
=== January ===
Day	Album	Artist	Label	Notes	Ref.
15	Something for You: Eliane Elias Sings & Plays Bill Evans	Eliane Elias	Blue Note	Produced byEliane Elias, Marc Johnson, Steve Rodby	

=== April ===
Day	Album	Artist	Label	Notes	Ref.
15	Life in Leipzig	Ketil Bjørnstad	ECM Records	Produced by Manfred Eicher	

=== May ===
Day	Album	Artist	Label	Notes	Ref.
13	Tokyo Day Trip	Pat Metheny with Christian McBride and Antonio Sanchez	Nonesuch Records	Live EP produced by Pat Metheny and Steve Rodby	
20	Floating Point	John McLaughlin	Abstract Logix		

=== June ===
Day	Album	Artist	Label	Notes	Ref.
24	Bossa Nova Stories	Eliane Elias	Blue Note	Produced by Eliane Elias, Steve Rodby	

=== September ===
Day	Album	Artist	Label	Notes	Ref.
2	A Kiss to Build a Dream On	Jessica Molaskey	Arbors		
8	Suite for the Seven Mountains	Marius Neset's People Are Machines	Edition Records	Produced by Marius Neset & Anton Eger	

=== October ===
Day	Album	Artist	Label	Notes	Ref.
13	Norwegian Song 2	Dag Arnesen Trio	Resonant Music		

== All critically reviewed albums ranked ==
=== Metacritic ===
Number	Artist	Album	Average score	Number of reviews	Reference
1	Aaron Parks	Invisible Cinema	88	5 reviews	
2	Esbjorn Svensson Trio	Leucocyte	83	5 reviews	
3	Mathias Eick	The Door	81	5 reviews	
4	Willie Nelson & Wynton Marsalis	Two Men With The Blues	80	19 reviews	
5	Cassandra Wilson	Loverly	79	12 reviews	

== Deaths ==
January

- 4
  - Irene Reid, American singer (born 1930).
  - Keith Smith, English trumpeter (born 1940).
- 11
  - Pete Candoli, American trumpeter (prostate cancer) (born 1923).
  - Steve Harris, English drummer and composer (born 1948).
- 20 – Tommy McQuater, British trumpeter (born 1914).
- 30
  - Bill Saragih, Indonesian musician (born 1933).
  - Miles Kington, British journalist and upright bassist, Instant Sunshine (born 1941).

February

- 3 – Jackie Orszaczky, Hungarian bass guitarist and composer (born 1948).
- 4 – Chris Anderson, American pianist (born 1926).
- 12 – John Brunious, American trumpeter and the bandleader, Preservation Hall Jazz Band (born 1940).
- 13 – Henri Salvador, French Caribbean comedian and singer (born 1917).
- 14 – Gene Allen, American jazz reedist (born 1928).
- 19 – Teo Macero, American saxophonist, record producer and composer (born 1925).

March

- 2 – Jeff Healey, Canadian singer and guitarist (born 1966).
- 10 – Dennis Irwin, American upright bassist (born 1951).
- 16 – Pete Chilver, British guitarist and hotelier (born 1924).
- 19 – Eivind Solberg, Norwegian trumpeter (born 1933).
- 21 – Patti Bown, American jazz pianist, composer, and singer (born 1931).
- 22 – Israel López Valdés or better known as Cachao, Cuban upright bassist and composer (born 1918).
- 24 – Chalmers Alford, American guitarist (born 1955).
- 29 – Allan Ganley, British drummer (born 1931).

April

- 7 – Phil Urso, American jazz tenor saxophonist and composer (born 1925).
- 12 – Bobby Tucker, American pianist and arranger (born 1923).
- 15 – Dick Charlesworth, English clarinettist, saxophonist, and bandleader (born 1932).
- 24 – Jimmy Giuffre, American musician (pneumonia) (born 1921).
- 25 – Humphrey Lyttelton, British jazz musician (born 1921).
- 27 – Hal Stein, American saxophonist (born 1928).

May

- 6 – Franz Jackson, American saxophonist (born 1912).
- 10 – Mario Schiano, Italian alto and soprano saxophonist (born 1933).
- 15
  - Bob Florence, American pianist (born 1932).
  - Walt Dickerson, American vibraphonist (born 1928).
- 24 – Jimmy McGriff, (multiple sclerosis), American organist (born 1936).
- 28 – Danny Moss, British jazz saxophonist (born 1927).
- 30
  - Campbell Burnap, British trombonist and broadcaster (cancer) (born 1939).
  - Nat Temple, British big band leader (born 1913).

June

- 4 – Bill Finegan, American pianist and arranger (born 1917).
- 14 – Esbjörn Svensson, Swedish pianist (Scuba diving accident) (born 1964).
- 28 – Ronnie Mathews, American pianist (born 1935).

July

- 3
  - Harald Heide-Steen Jr., (lung cancer), Norwegian actor, comedian and jazz singer (born 1939).
  - Salah Ragab, Egyptian drummer and called the founder Egyptian jazz (born 1936).
- 6 – Bobby Durham, American drummer (born 1937).
- 13 – Gerald Wiggins, American pianist (born 1922).
- 22 – Joe Beck, American guitarist (lung cancer) (born 1945).
- 25
  - Hiram Bullock, American fusion guitarist (throat cancer) (born 1955).
  - Johnny Griffin, American saxophonist (heart attack) (born 1928).
- 31
  - Lee Young, American drummer and singer (born 1914).
  - Yusuf Salim, American jazz pianist and composer (born 1929).

August

- 15 – Jerry Wexler, American music journalist and music producer (born 1917).
- 19 – LeRoi Moore, American saxophonist (Dave Matthews Band) (born 1961).
- 23 – Jimmy Cleveland, American trombonist (born 1926).

September

- 2 – Arne Domnérus, Swedish saxophonist (born 1924).
- 3
  - Géo Voumard, Swiss jazz pianist and composer (born 1920).
  - Pierre Van Dormael, Belgian musician and composer (born 1952).
- 8 – Bheki Mseleku, South African musician (piano, saxophone, guitar) and composer (diabetes-related) (born 1955).
- 15 – Richard Wright, English keyboardist, composer, singer and songwriter (born 1943).
- 16 – Jim Aton, American bassist (born 1925).
- 19
  - Dick Sudhalter, American trumpeter and critic (born 1938).
  - Earl Palmer, American rock-and-roll and rhythm-and-blues drummer (born 1924).
- 22 – Connie Haines, American singer (born 1921).
- 30 – Henry Adler, American drummer and percussionist (born 1915).

October

- 4 – Alfred Gallodoro, American musician (born 1913).
- 11 – Neal Hefti, American trumpeter and composer (born 1922).
- 18 – Dave McKenna, American pianist (born 1930).
- 24 – Merl Saunders, American multi-genre musician who played piano and keyboards (born 1934).
- 26 – Marc Moulin, Belgian musician and journalist (born 1942).
- 27 – Ray Ellis, American record producer, arranger, and conductor (born 1923).

November

- 1 – Jimmy Carl Black, American drummer and singer of The Mothers of Invention (born 1938).
- 9 – Miriam Makeba, nicknamed Mama Africa, was a South African singer and civil rights activist (born 1932).
- 16 – Tony Reedus, American drummer (born 1959).
- 27 – Pekka Pohjola, Finnish multi-instrumentalist, composer, and producer (born 1952).

December

- 3 – Derek Wadsworth, English trombonist, composer, and arranger (born 1939).
- 5 – Anca Parghel, Romanian jazz singer, composer, arranger, pianist, and choir conductor (born 1957).
- 7 – Jimmy Gourley, American guitarist (born 1926).
- 12 – Prince Lasha, American alto saxophonist, flautist, and clarinetist (born 1929).
- 19
  - Kenny Cox, American pianist (born 1940).
  - Page Cavanaugh, American pianist, vocalist, and arranger (born 1922).
  - Verne Byers, American bandleader, bassist, and concert promoter (born 1918).
- 22 – Guy Warren, Ghanaian singer-songwriter (born 1923).
- 23 – Monty Waters, American saxophonist, flautist, and singer (born 1938).
- 25 – Eartha Kitt, American singer, actress, dancer, activist, and comedian (born 1927).
- 29 – Freddie Hubbard, American trumpeter (born 1938).

Unknown date

- Byrdie Green, American singer (born 1936).

== See also ==
- List of 2008 albums
- List of years in jazz
- 2000s in jazz
- 2008 in music
