= Fukumori =

Fukumori (written: 福盛 or 福森) is a Japanese surname. Notable people with the surname include:

- Akito Fukumori (福森 晃斗, born 1992), Japanese footballer
- Kazuo Fukumori (福盛 和男, born 1976), Japanese baseball player
- Kenta Fukumori (福森 健太, born 1994), Japanese footballer
- Naoya Fukumori (福森 直也, born 1992), Japanese footballer
- Shinya Fukumori (福盛 進也, born 1984), Japanese jazz drummer and composer
