= 1948 in jazz =

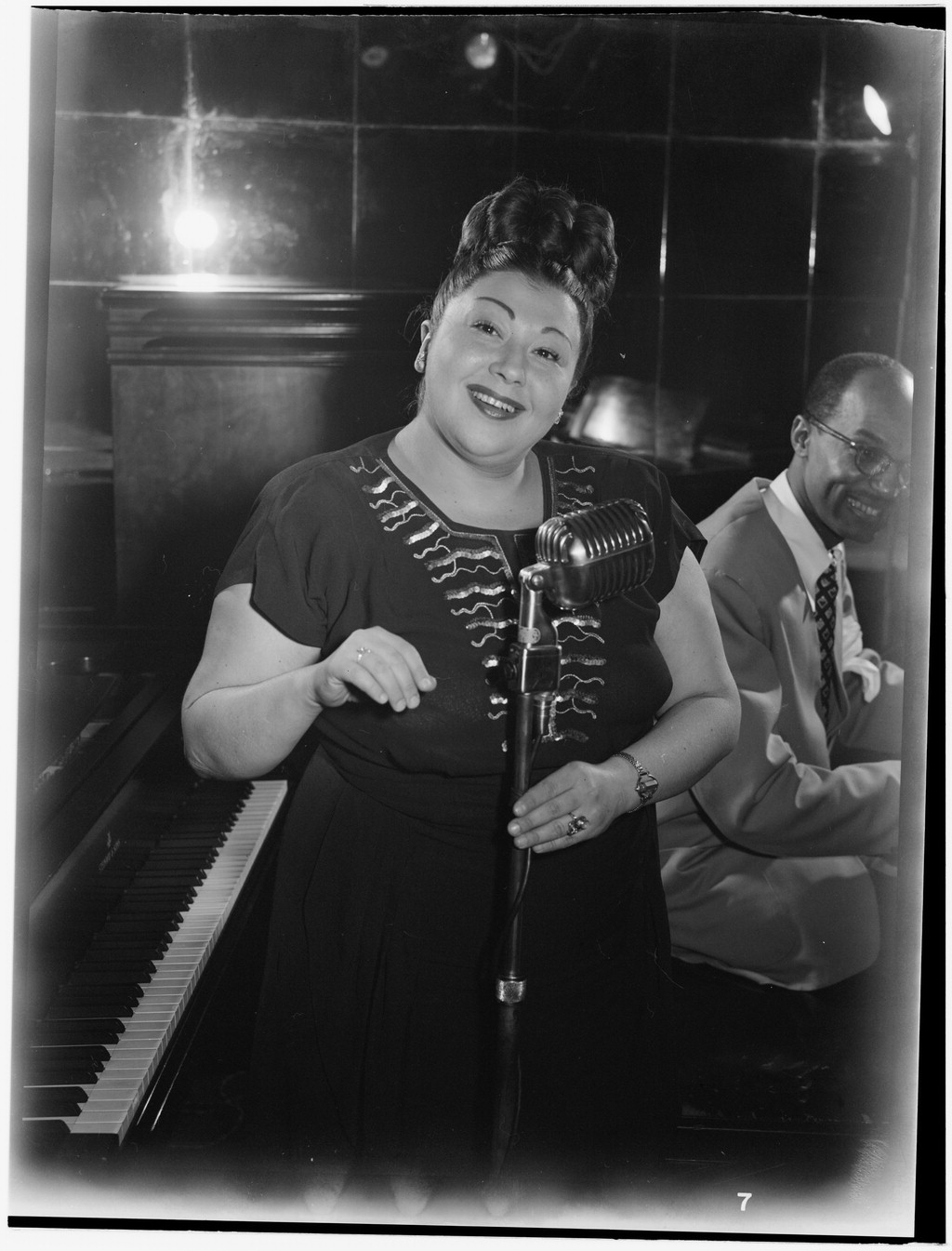
- Sylvia Syms and Bob Wyatt, New York, N.Y.
- Decade: 1940s in jazz
- Music: 1948 in music
- Standards: List of 1940s jazz standards
- See also: 1947 in jazz – 1949 in jazz

== 1948 in jazz ==
This is a timeline documenting events of Jazz in the year 1948.

The Nice Jazz Festival held annually since February 25, 1948 in Nice, on the French Riviera. Also in 1948, Louis Armstrong formed the first version of the Jazz All Stars with Jack Teagarden on trombone, Barney Bigard on clarinet, Dick Carey on piano, Sid Catlett on drums and Arvell Shaw on bass. Their music fits in with New Orleans revival. Louis Armstrong performed at the Jazz festival in 1948, where Suzy Delair sang "C'est si bon" by Henri Betti and André Hornez for the first time in public.

== Events ==
=== February ===
- 22 – The very first Nice Jazz Festival started in Nice, France (February 22 – 28).
  - The Nice Jazz Festival is inaugurated. Held annually in Nice, on the French Riviera, it is "the first jazz festival of international significance."

== Album releases ==
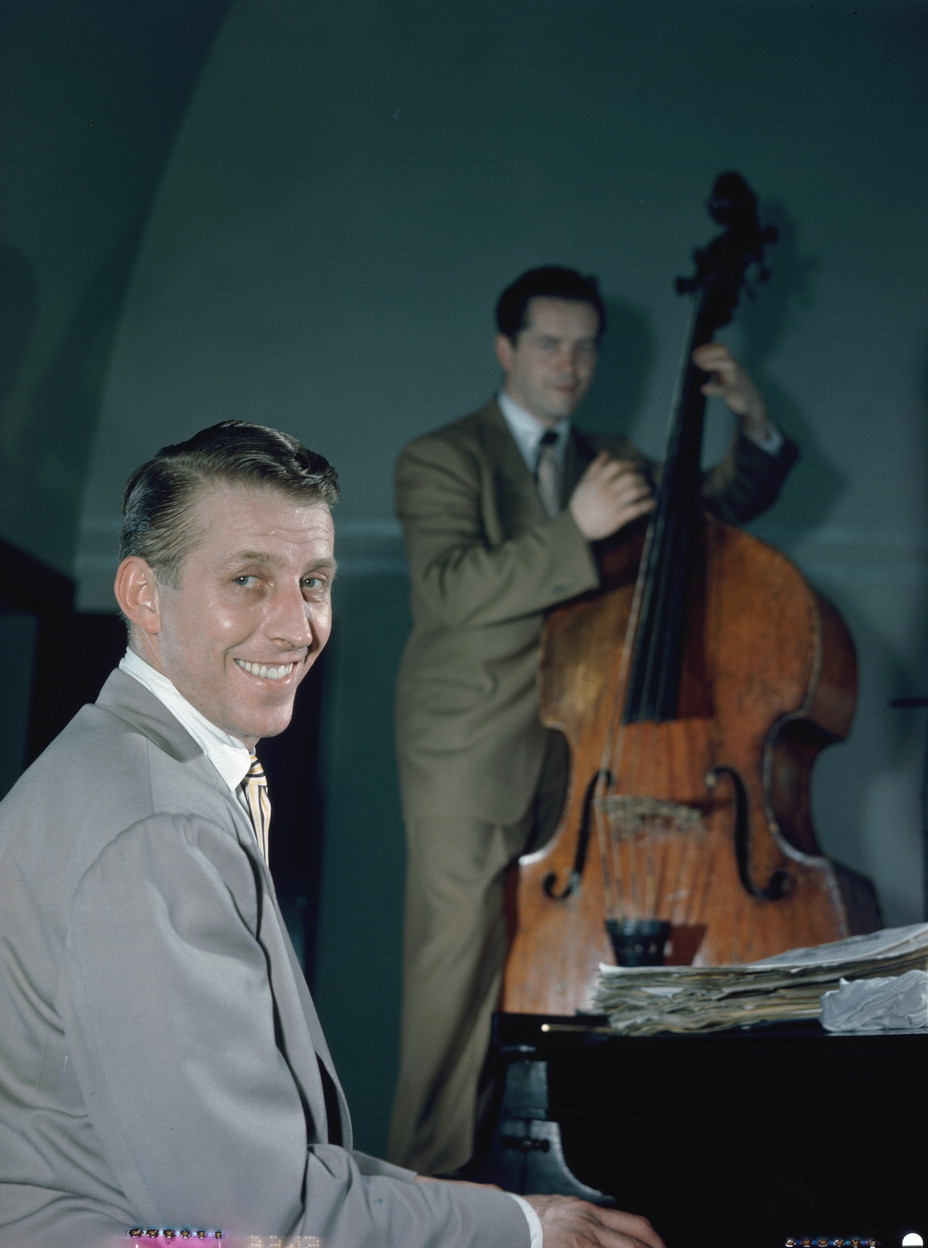
Stan Kenton with bassist Eddie Safranski, 1948

- Coleman Hawkins: Picasso
- Stan Kenton: A Presentation of Progressive Jazz

== Deaths ==
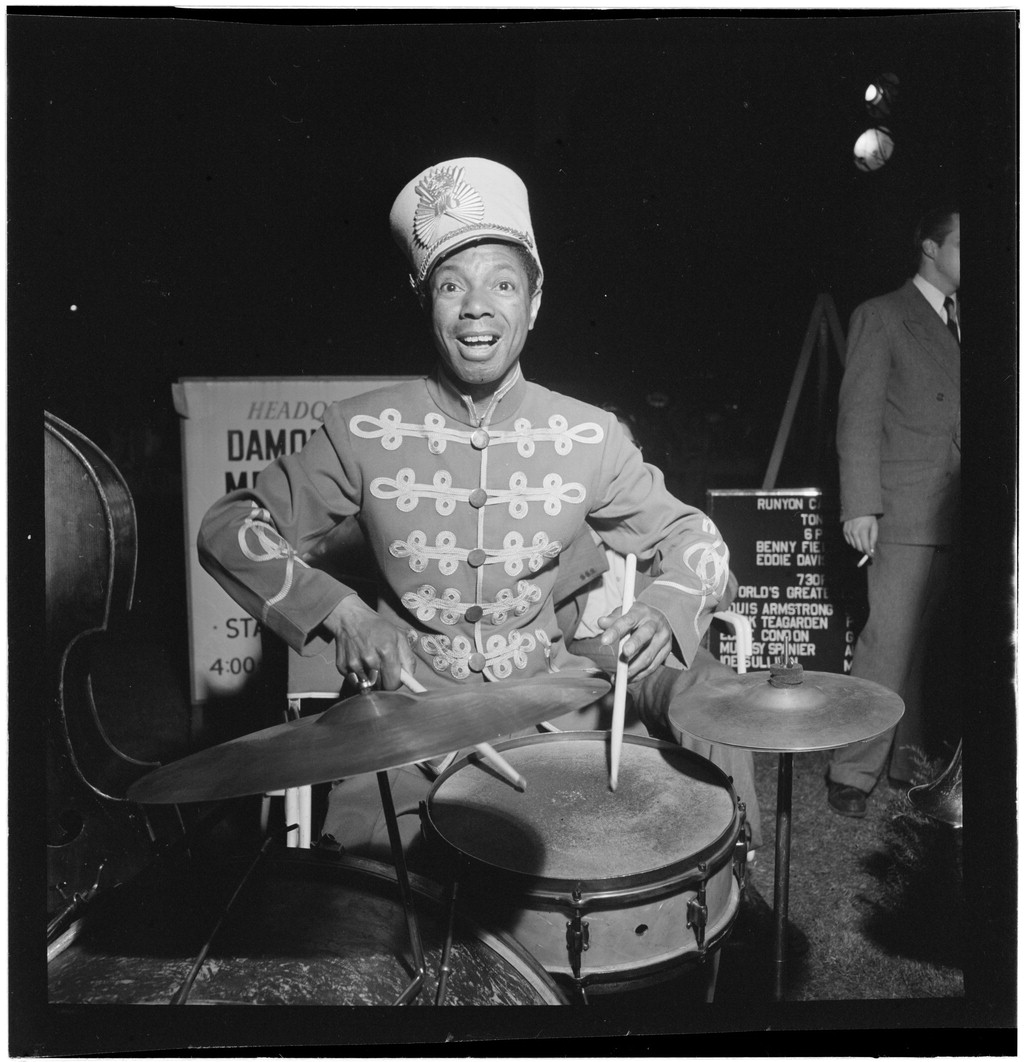
Kaiser Marshall

January

- 3 – Kaiser Marshall, American jazz drummer (born 1899).

February

- 6 – Sidney Arodin, American jazz clarinetist and songwriter (born 1901).
- 7 – Red McKenzie, one of the only comb players in jazz history (born 1899).

September

- 3 – Mutt Carey, New Orleans jazz trumpeter (born 1891).

October

- 4 – Jan Savitt, American bandleader, musical arranger, and violinist (born 1907).

November

- 23 – Stan Hasselgård, Swedish jazz clarinetist (born 1922).

December

- 3 – Chano Pozo, Cuban percussionist, singer, dancer and composer (born 1915).
- 6 – Dave Tough, American jazz drummer (born 1907).
- 31 – Wilton Crawley, American composer and clarinetist (born 1900).

== Births ==
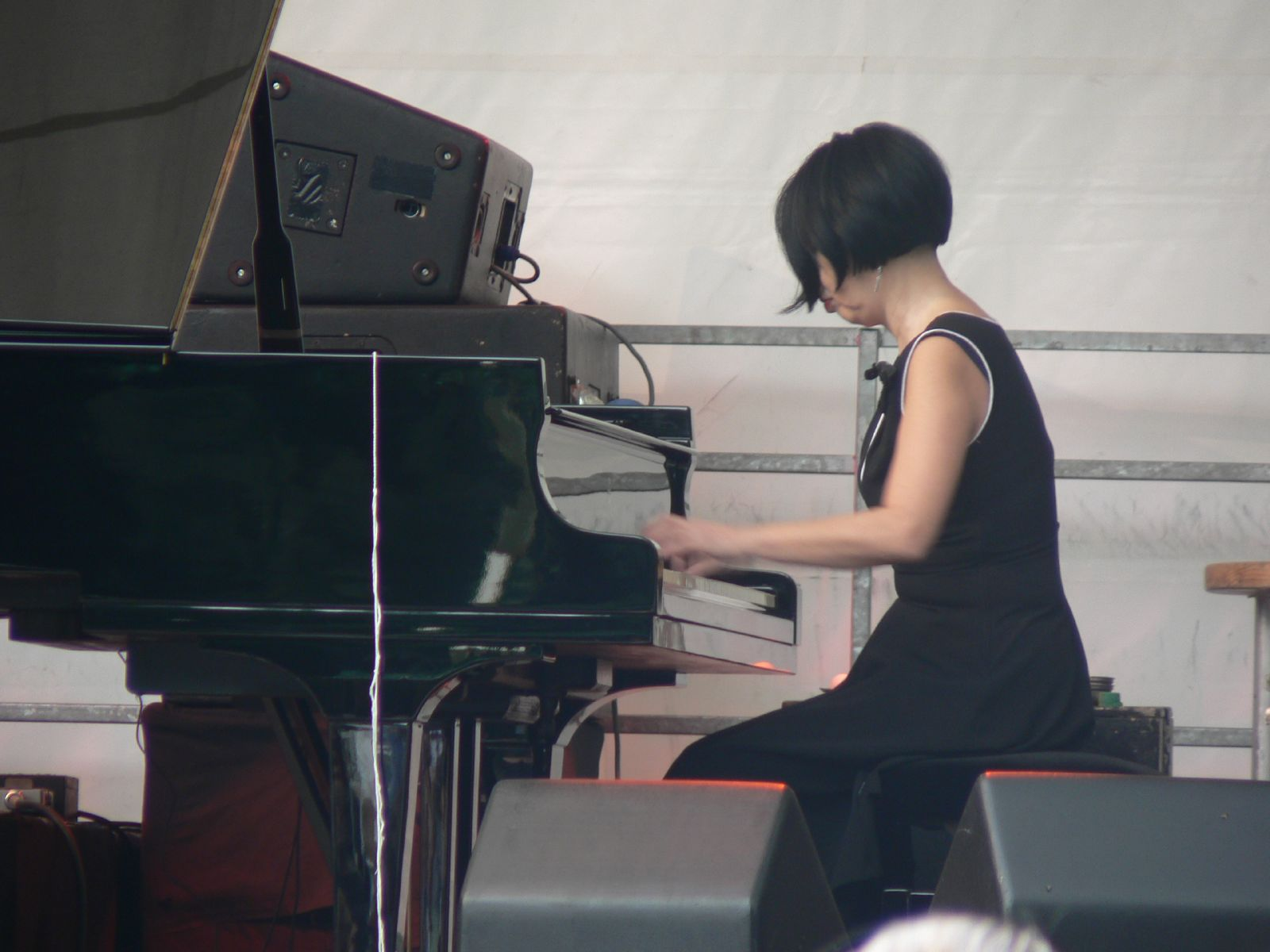
Aki Takase

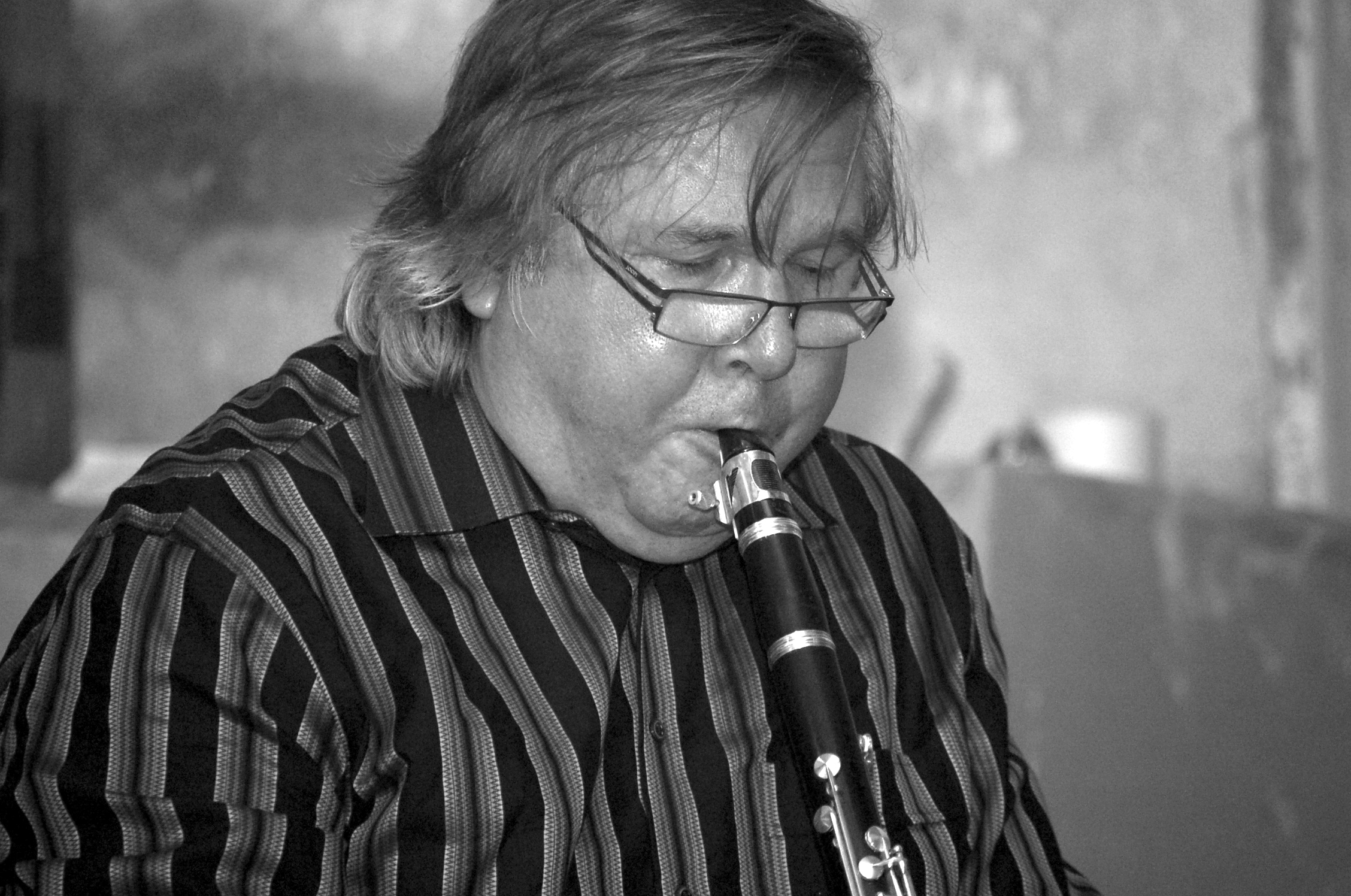
Theo Jörgensmann at "Kulturhalle Jülchendorf", Germany 2009.

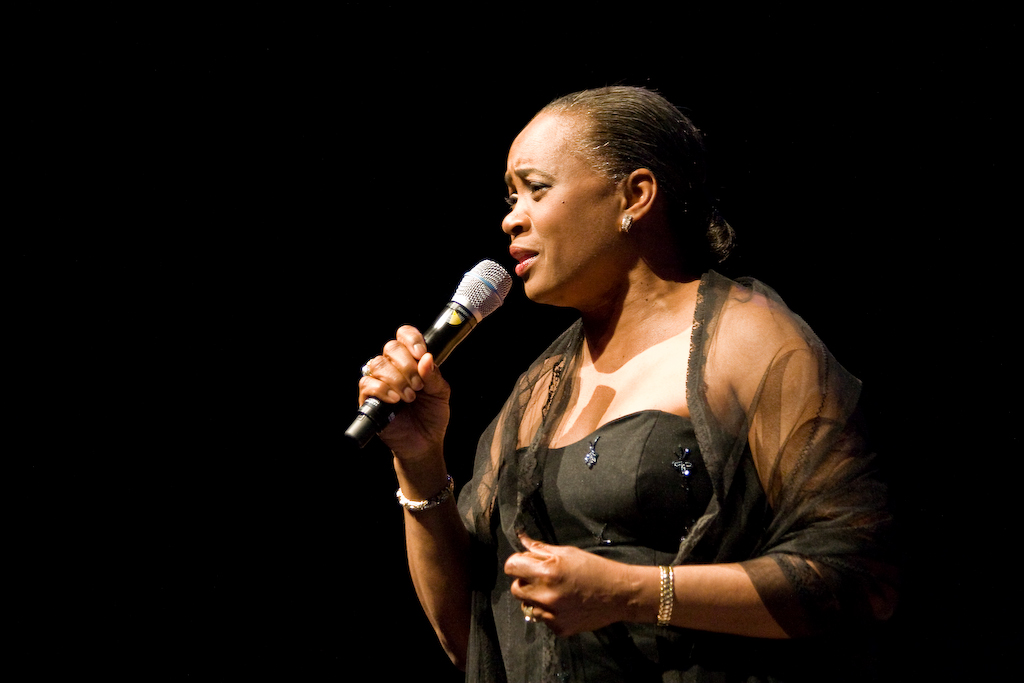
Barbara Hendricks at The Hague Jazz Festival 2008.

January

- 2 – John Madrid, American trumpet player (died 1990).
- 8 – Thurman Barker, American drummer.
- 10 - Donald Fagen, American singer, songwriter and pianist.
- 12 – John Etheridge, English guitarist.
- 15 – Juma Santos, American percussionist and master drummer (died 2007).
- 18 – Ryoko Moriyama, Japanese singer.
- 26 – Aki Takase, Japanese pianist and composer.
- 28 – Bob Moses, American drummer.
- 29 – Espen Rud, Norwegian drummer.
- 31 – Joyce Moreno, Brazilian singer-songwriter, guitarist, and arranger.

February

- 3 – Dennis Rowland, American vocalist.
- 12 – Juini Booth, American upright bassist.
- 22 – Joe LaBarbera, American jazz drummer and composer.
- 24 – Maggie Nicols, Scottish vocalist, dancer, and performer, Feminist Improvising Group.
- 26 – Mike Richmond, American bassist.
- 29 – Richie Cole, American saxophonist, composer, and arranger.

March

- 1 – Konrad Kaspersen, Norwegian upright bassist.
- 2
  - Larry Carlton, American guitarist.
  - Phil Bowler, American upright bassist.
- 6 – Marc Jordan, American-born Canadian singer-songwriter.
- 7 – Danilo Caymmi, Brazilian musician, singer, composer and arranger.
- 9 – Fumio Karashima, Japanese pianist (died 2017).
- 13 – Jon Sholle, American guitarist and multi-instrumentalist (died 2018).
- 17 – Jessica Williams, American pianist and composer.
- 19
  - David Schnitter, American saxophonist.
  - Henning Gravrok, Norwegian saxophonist.
- 20 – Marva Wright, American blues singer (died 2010).
- 23
  - John McNeil, American jazz trumpet player.
  - Tsuyoshi Yamamoto, Japanese pianist and composer.
- 24 – Frode Gjerstad, Norwegian saxophonist.

April

- 20 – Joe Bonner, American pianist (died 2014).
- 22 – Jan Kaspersen, Danish pianist, composer, and bandleader.
- 28 – Dorothée Berryman, Canadian singer.

May

- 1 – Carl Morten Iversen, Norwegian upright bassist.
- 8 – Jackie Orszaczky, Hungarian-Australian bass guitarist (died 2008).
- 9 – Tania Maria, Brazilian pianist, singer, composer, and bandleader.
- 16 – Adrian Legg, English guitarist, luthier, instructor, and composer.
- 19 – Tom Scott, American saxophonist, composer, arranger, conductor, and bandleader.
- 20 – Roger Frampton, Australian pianist, saxophonist, and composer (died 2000).
- 27 – Marc Copland, American pianist and composer.
- 31 – Paulinho da Costa, Brazilian percussionist.

June

- 1 – Ryo Fukui, Japanese pianist (died 2016).
- 4 – Paquito D'Rivera, Cuban saxophonist and clarinetist.
- 7 – Clifford Barbaro, American drummer.
- 16 – Fredy Studer, Swiss percussionist.
- 21 – Dan Fogel, American organist.
- 27 – Bill Summers, Afro-Cuban percussionist.

July

- 7 – Jorge Dalto, Argentinian pianist (died 1987).
- 10 – Bruce Fowler, American trombonist, Mothers of Invention.
- 14 – Doug Carn, American organist and pianist.
- 16 – Rubén Blades, Panamanian singer, songwriter, actor, musician, activist, and politician.
- 30 – Julia Tsenova, Bulgarian composer and pianist (died 2010).
- 31 – Chuck Wilson, American saxophonist (died 2018).

August

- 2 – Chris Bennett, American singer, pianist, songwriter (died 2011).
- 3 – Ray Reach, American pianist, vocalist, and educator.
- 11 – Bill Heid, American pianist and organist.
- 13 – Anthony Moore, British experimental music composer, performer and producer, Henry Cow.
- 16 – Steve Harris, English drummer and composer (died 2008).

September

- 4 – Michael Cochrane, American pianist.
- 5 – Karen Borca, American bassoonist.
- 6 – Roger Dean, British-Australian pianist, academic, biochemist, and cognitive scientist.
- 10 – Lorraine Feather, American singer and songwriter.
- 12 – Steve Turre, American trombonist.
- 21 – Henry Butler, American pianist (died 2018).
- 25 – Bill Pierce, American saxophonist.
- 28 – Danny Weis, American guitarist.
- 29 – Theo Jörgensmann, German Basset clarinetist and composer (died 2025).

October

- 2 – Avery Brooks, American actor, jazz musician, opera singer, and college professor.
- 4 – Gary Brunotte, American pianist and organist.
- 9 – Dave Samuels, American vibraphonist and marimba player, Spyro Gyra.
- 13 – Geoff Simkins, British alto saxophonist.
- 16 – Carli Muñoz, Puerto Rican pianist.
- 23 – Rose Nabinger, German singer.

November

- 1 – Raphe Malik, American trumpeter (died 2006).
- 9 – Kazimierz Jonkisz, Polish drummer.
- 11 – Marvin Peterson or Hannibal Lokumbe, American trumpeter and composer.
- 16 – Chi Coltrane, American songwriter, pianist and singer.
- 20 – Barbara Hendricks, American-born operatic soprano and concert singer.
- 21 – Alphonse Mouzon, American fusion drummer and percussionist, Return to Forever (died 2016).
- 23
  - Emil Viklický, Czech pianist and composer.
  - Thara Memory, American trumpeter (died 2017).
- 30 – Stan Sulzmann, English saxophonist.

December

- 6 – Harvie Swartz, American upright bassist.
- 7 – Mads Vinding, Danish upright bassist.
- 15
  - Carlos Zingaro, American pianist.
  - Toshinori Kondo, Japanese avant-garde jazz and jazz fusion trumpeter.
- 23 – Jim Ferguson, American jazz guitarist, composer, author, educator, and music journalist.

Unknown date

- Dave Eshelman, American trombonist and composer.
- Guy Van Duser, American guitarist.
- Jaroslav Jakubovič, Czech-born Israeli jazz saxophonist, composer and record producer.
- The Mascara Snake or Victor Hayden, American avant-garde clarinetist, Captain Beefheart and His Magic Band (died 2018).

== See also ==
- 1940s in jazz
- List of years in jazz
- 1948 in music

== Bibliography ==
- The New Real Book, Volume I. Sher Music. 1988. ISBN 0-9614701-4-3.
- The New Real Book, Volume II. Sher Music. 1991. ISBN 0-9614701-7-8.
- The New Real Book, Volume III. Sher Music. 1995. ISBN 1-883217-30-X.
- The Real Book, Volume I (6th ed.). Hal Leonard. 2004. ISBN 0-634-06038-4.
- The Real Book, Volume II (2nd ed.). Hal Leonard. 2007. ISBN 978-1-4234-2452-9.
- The Real Book, Volume III (2nd ed.). Hal Leonard. 2006. ISBN 0-634-06136-4.
- The Real Jazz Book. Warner Bros. ISBN 978-91-85041-36-7.
- The Real Vocal Book, Volume I. Hal Leonard. 2006. ISBN 0-634-06080-5.
