= 1933 in jazz =

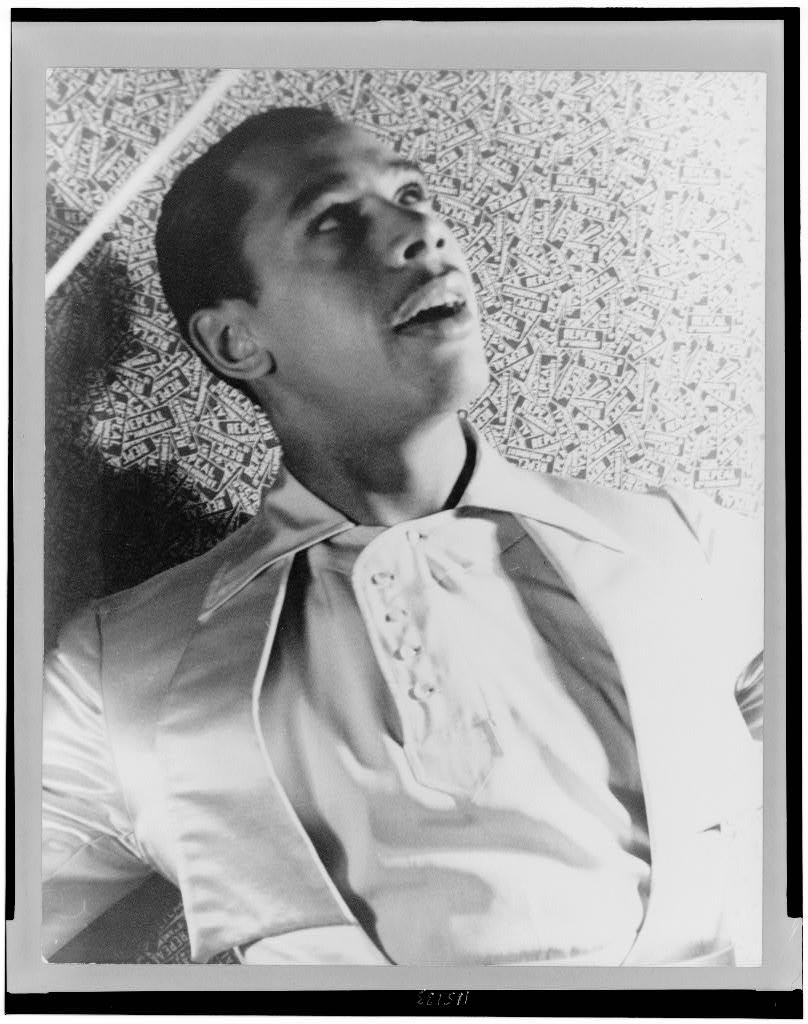
- Portrait of Cab Calloway (December 25, 1907–November 18, 1994) American jazz singer and bandleader, by Carl Van Vechten
- Decade: 1930s in jazz
- Music: 1933 in music
- Standards: List of 1930s jazz standards
- See also: 1932 in jazz – 1934 in jazz

This is a timeline documenting events of Jazz in the year 1933.

== Events ==
- Louis Armstrong goes on a tour to Europe. He is a sensation on all stages in which he appears, and fills the Tivoli in Copenhagen eight nights in a row.
- The Duke Ellington Band travels to Europe, and they are well received in England. Ellington is considered a significant composer in London.
- Ellington records "Solitude" and "Sophisticated Lady".
- Teddy Wilson is in New York City playing with the Benny Carter Band.
- Bessie Smith records for the last time in a session arranged by John Hammond. "Gimme a Pigfoot" was recorded at this session.
- Billie Holiday was discovered by John Hammond in Monette's in New York City. Billie record her singing with Benny Goodman.

== Deaths ==
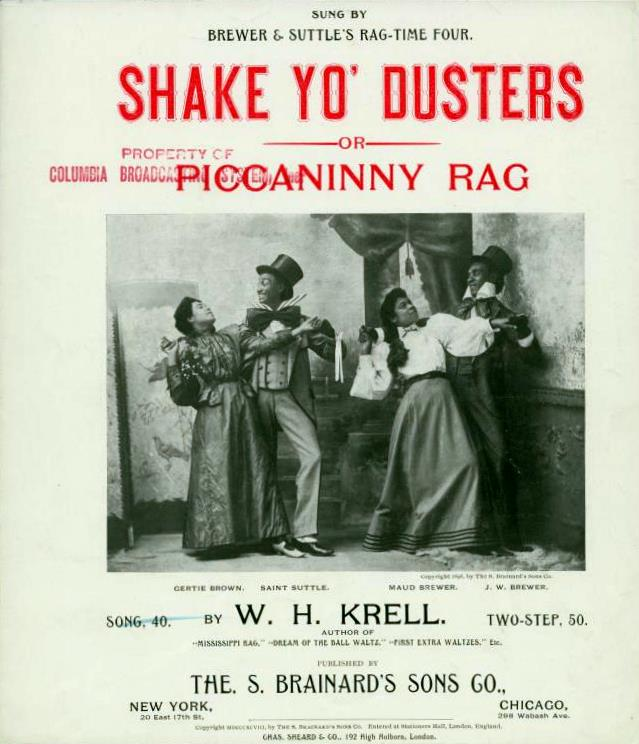
Shake yo' dusters, or, Piccaninny rag, by W. H. Krell, 1898

March

October 12th, Jimmy Wade, jazz trumpeter (born 1895)

- 26 – Eddie Lang, American guitarist, regarded as Father of Jazz Guitar (born 1902).

July

- 15 – Freddie Keppard, jazz cornetist (born 1889).

September

- 30 – William Krell, American bandleader and composer (born 1868).

== Births ==
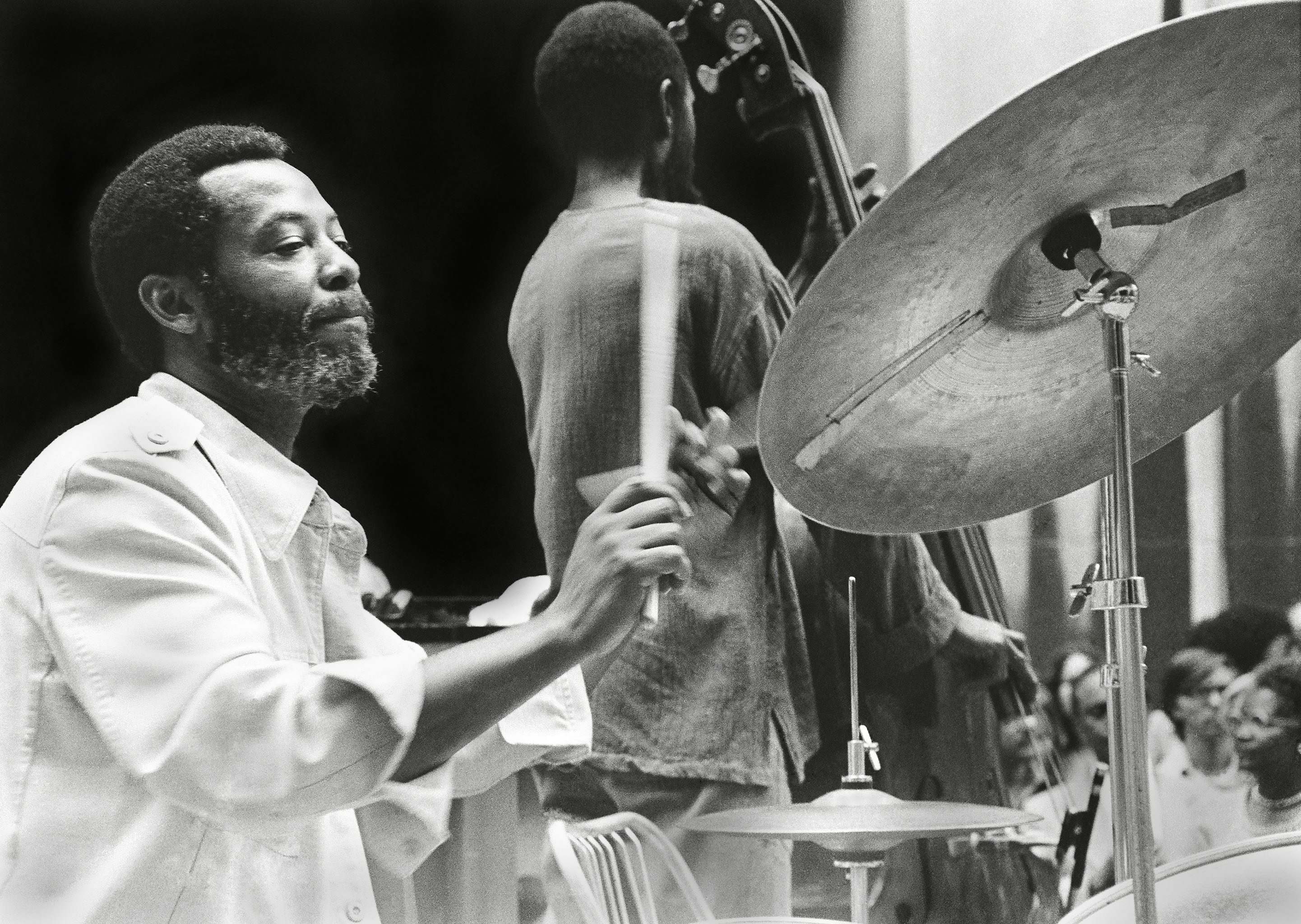
Ben Riley at Heath Brothers concert Rockefeller Center, NYC June 1977

January

- 1
  - Bill Saragih, Indonesian musician (died 2008).
  - Hideo Shiraki, Japanese drummer and bandleader (died 1972).

February

- 1 – Sadao Watanabe, Japanese saxophonist.
- 2 – Orlando "Cachaito" López, Cuban bassist (died 2009).
- 3 – John Handy, American saxophonist.
- 17 – Spike Heatley, British bassist (died 2021).
- 20 – Charles Kynard, American organist (died 1979).
- 21 – Nina Simone, American singer and pianist (died 2003).
- 24 – David "Fathead" Newman, American saxophonist (died 2009).

March

- 3 – Jimmy Garrison, American upright bassist (died 1976).
- 4 – Ann Burton, Dutch singer (died 1989).
- 14
  - Duke Carl Gregor of Mecklenburg, member of the House of Mecklenburg-Strelitz and a music and art historian (died 2018).
  - Quincy Jones, American conductor, composer and trumpeter.
- 17 – Dick Maloney, Canadian singer (died 2010).
- 23
  - Andrzej Trzaskowski, Polish composer and musicologist (died 1998).
  - Dave Frishberg, American pianist, vocalist, and composer (died 2021).
- 26 – Donald Bailey, American drummer (died 2013).
- 28 – Tete Montoliu, Spanish-Catalonian pianist (died 1997).

April

- 6 – Bill Hardman, American trumpeter and flugelhornist (died 1990).
- 8 – Paul Jeffrey, American tenor saxophonist (died 2015).
- 21 – Ian Carr, Scottish trumpeter, composer, writer, and educator (died 2009).
- 27 – Calvin Newborn, American guitarist (died 2018).
- 28 – Oliver Jackson, American drummer (died 1994).

May

- 5 – Cal Collins, American guitarist (died 2001).
- 14 – Stu Williamson, American trumpeter (died 1991).
- 20 – Charles Davis, American saxophonist and composer (died 2016).
- 22 – Eivind Solberg, Norwegian trumpeter (died 2008).
- 24 – Michael White, American violinist (died 2016).
- 30 – Michael Garrick, English pianist and composer (died 2011).

June

- 20 – Lazy Lester, American singer and guitarist (died 2018).

July

- 1 – Rashied Ali, American drummer (died 2009).
- 17 – Ben Riley, American drummer (died 2017).
- 20 – Mario Schiano, Italian saxophonist (died 2008).

August

- 4 – Sonny Simmons, American saxophonist (died 2021).
- 10 – Trudy Pitts, American keyboardist (died 2010).
- 15 – Bill Dowdy, American drummer (died 2017).
- 19 – Asmund Bjørken, Norwegian accordionist and saxophonist (died 2018).
- 25
  - Rune Gustafsson, Swedish guitarist (died 2012).
  - Wayne Shorter, American saxophonist and composer (died 2023).
- 27 – Rudolf Dašek, Czech guitarist (died 2013).
- 31 – Herman Riley, American tenor saxophonist (died 2007).

September

- 1 – Gene Harris, American pianist (died 2000).
- 11 – Baby Face Willette, American Hammond organist (died 1971).
- 30 – Steve McCall, American drummer (died 1989).

October

- 2 – Ronnie Ross, British baritone saxophonist (died 1991).
- 18 – Bross Townsend, American pianist (died 2003).
- 19 – Jimmy Dotson, American singer, guitarist, and drummer (died 2017).
- 23 – Gary McFarland, composer, vibraphonist, and singer (died 1971).
- 25 – Jack Petersen, American guitarist, pianist, and composer.

November

- 11
  - Marlene VerPlanck, American singer (died 2018).
  - Sture Nordin, Swedish upright bassist (died 2000).

December

- 1
  - Billy Paul, Congolese singer and musician (died 2016).
  - Lou Rawls, American singer and songwriter (died 2006).
- 4 – Denis Charles, American drummer (died 1998).
- 13 – Borah Bergman, American pianist (died 2012).
- 14 – Leo Wright, American saxophonist (died 1991).
- 16 – Johnny "Hammond" Smith, American organist (died 1997).
- 17
  - John Ore, American bassist (died 2014).
  - Walter Booker, American upright bassist (died 2006).
- 18 – Lonnie Brooks, American blues singer and guitarist (died 2017).
- 23 – Frank Morgan, American saxophonist (died 2007).
- 26 – Billy Bean, American guitarist (died 2012).
- 29 – Brian Brown, Australian saxophones (died 2013).
- 30 – Lanny Steele, American pianist (died 1994).

Unknown date

- Jim Newman, American saxophonist and television producer.
- Nikele Moyake, South African tenor saxophonist (died 1966).

== See also ==
- 1933 in music
