= 2007 in jazz =

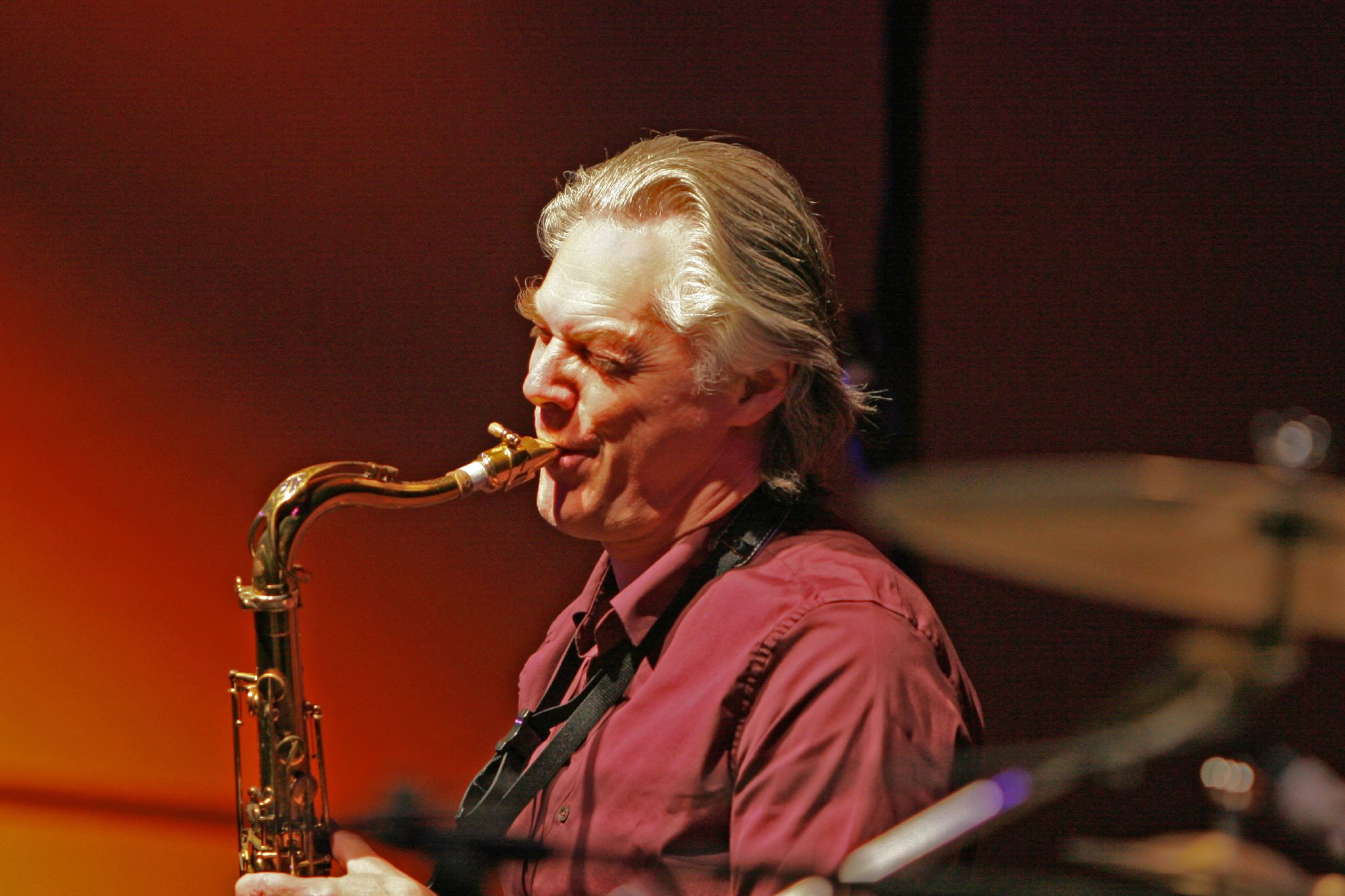
- Jan Garbarek live in Athens, 2007.
- Decade: 2000s in jazz
- Music: 2007 in music
- Standards: List of jazz standards
- See also: 2006 in jazz – 2008 in jazz

This is a timeline documenting events of Jazz in the year 2007.

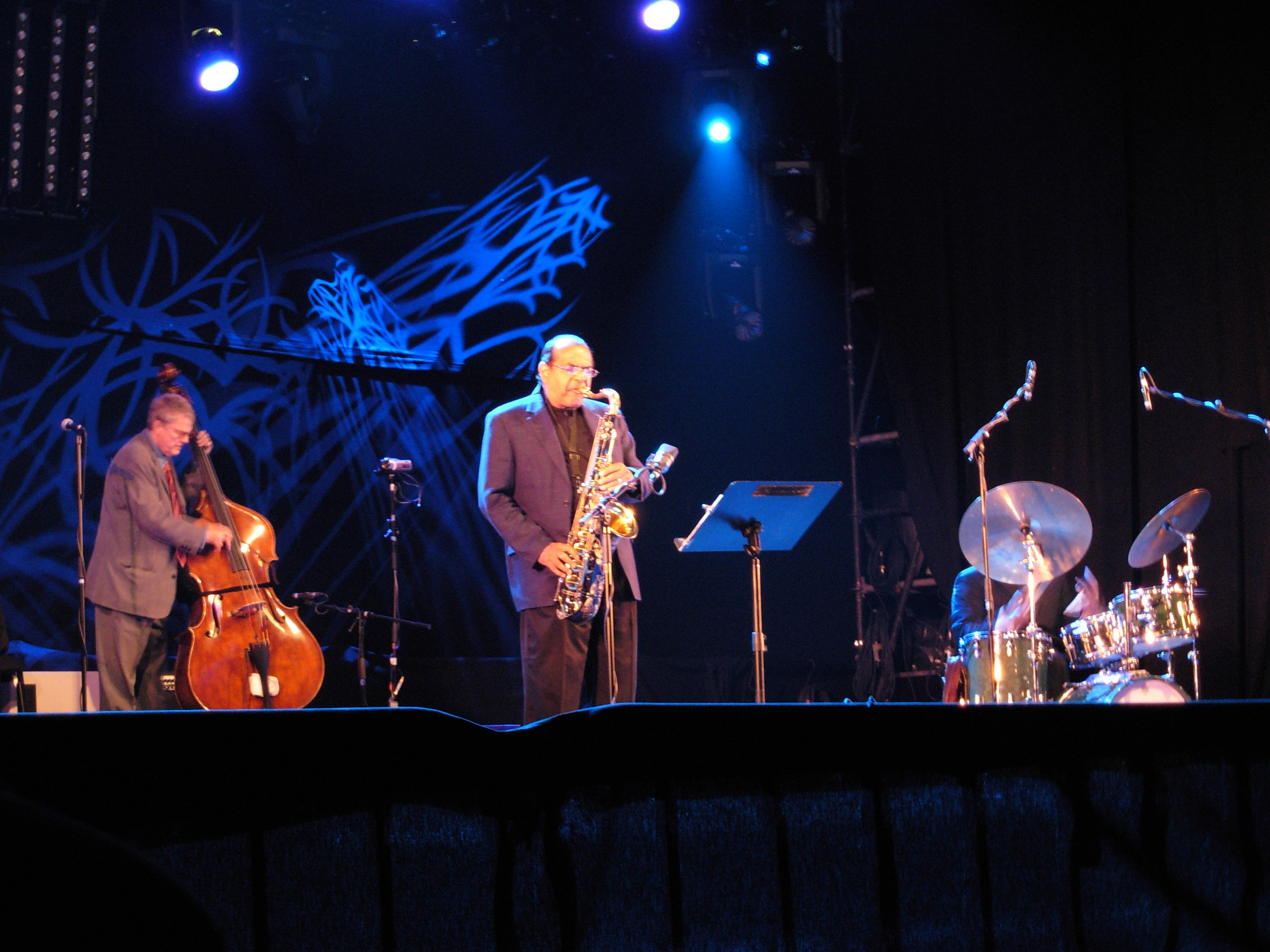
Charlie Haden and Quartet West 2007.

== Events ==
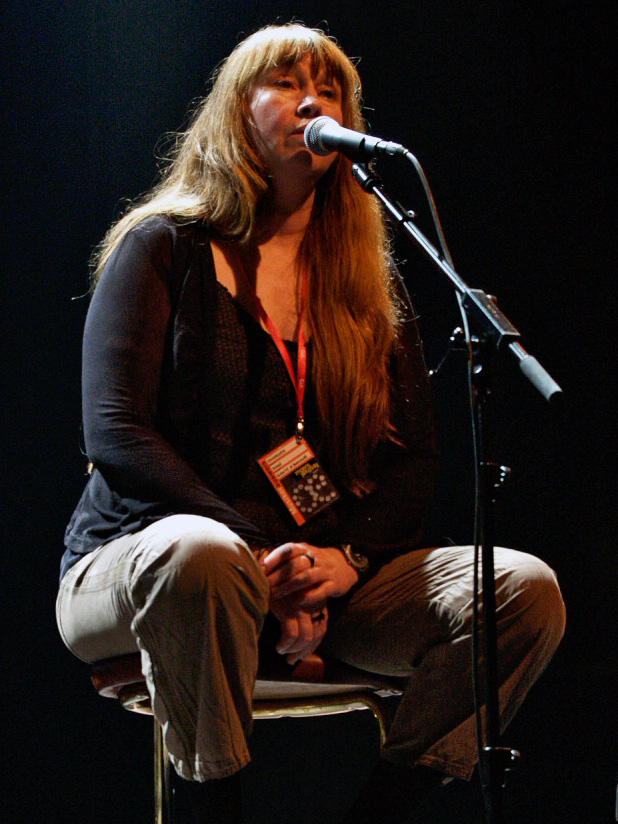
Sidsel Endresen at Moers Festival 2007.

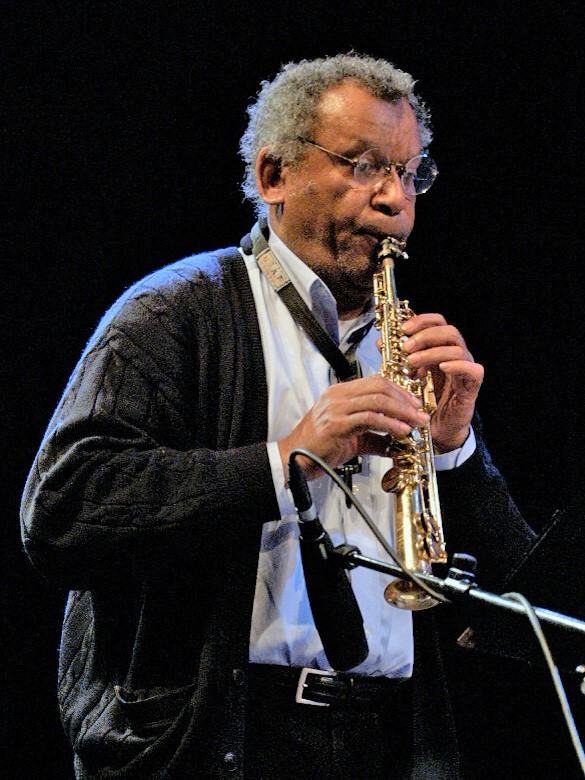
Anthony Braxton at Moers Festival 2007.

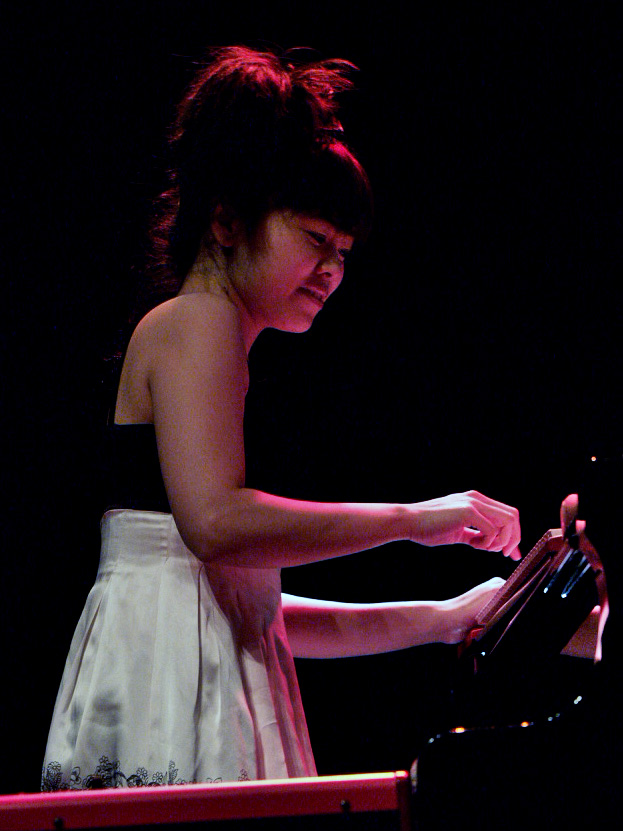
Hiromi at Moers Festival 2007.

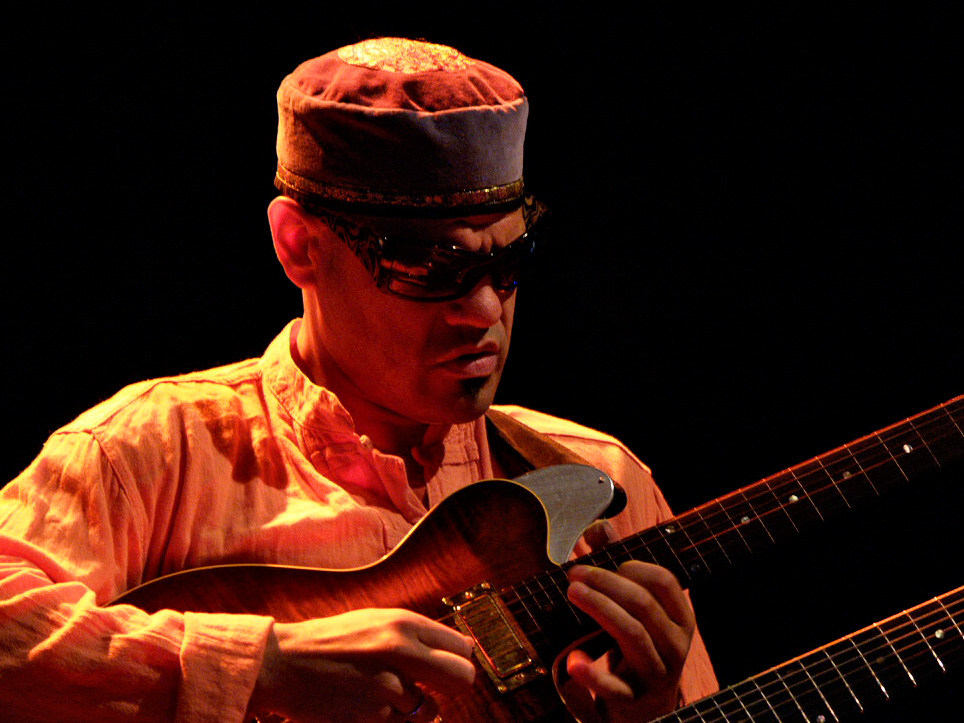
David Fiuczynski at Moers Festival 2007.

=== January ===
- 17 – The 2nd Ice Music Festival Festival started in Geilo, Norway (January 17–19).

=== February ===
- 1 – The 10th Polarjazz Festival 2007 started in Longyearbyen, Svalbard (February 1–4).

=== March ===
- 2 – The 3rd Jakarta International Java Jazz Festival started in Jakarta, Indonesia (January 2 – 4).
- 30
  - The 34th Vossajazz started at Vossavangen, Norway (March 30 – April 1).
  - Snorre Bjerck was awarded Vossajazzprisen 2007.
- 31 – Berit Opheim performs the commissioned work Ein engel går stilt for Vossajazz 2007.

=== May ===
- 23 – The 35th Nattjazz started in Bergen, Norway (May 23 – June 2).
- 25 – The 36th Moers Festival started in Moers, Germany (May 25 – 28).

=== June ===
- 28 – The 27th Montreal International Jazz Festival started in Montreal, Quebec, Canada (June 28 - July 8).
- 25 – The 19th Jazz Fest Wien started in Vienna, Austria (June 25 – July 12).

=== July ===
- 4 – The 43nd Kongsberg Jazzfestival started in Kongsberg, Norway (July 4 – 7).
- 6
  - The 29th Copenhagen Jazz Festival started in Copenhagen, Denmark (July 6 – 15).
  - The 41st Montreux Jazz Festival started in Montreux, Switzerland (July 6 – 21).
- 13 – The 32nd North Sea Jazz Festival started in The Hague, Netherlands (July 13 – 15).
- 14 – The 42nd Pori Jazz Festival started in Pori, Finland (July 14 – 22).
- 16
  - The 47th Moldejazz started in Molde, Norway (July 16 – 21).
  - Arve Henriksen received the Radka Toneff Memorial Award at Moldejazz opening concert.
- 17 – The 24th Stockholm Jazz Festival started in Stockholm, Sweden (July 17 – 21).
- 18 – The 60th Nice Jazz Festival started in Nice, France (July 18 – 25).
- 24 – The 42nd San Sebastian Jazz Festival started in San Sebastian, Spain (July 24 – 29).

=== August ===
- 8 – The 21st Sildajazz started in Haugesund, Norway (August 8 – 12).
- 9 – The 23rd Brecon Jazz Festival started in Brecon, Wales (August 9 – 12).
- 10 – The 53rd Newport Jazz Festival started in Newport, Rhode Island (August 10 – 12).
- 13 – The 22nd Oslo Jazzfestival started in Oslo, Norway (August 13 – 19).
- 29 – The 3rd Punktfestivalen started in Kristiansand, Norway (August 29 – September 1).

=== September ===
- 21 – The 50th Monterey Jazz Festival started in Monterey, California (September 21 – 23).

=== November ===
- 16 – The 16th London Jazz Festival started in London, England (November 16 – 25).

== Album released ==
=== January ===
Day	Album	Artist	Label	Notes	Ref.
29	Norwegian Song	Dag Arnesen Trio	Resonant Music		

=== March ===
Day	Album	Artist	Label	Notes	Ref.
20	Metheny/Mehldau Quartet	Pat Metheny and Brad Mehldau	Nonesuch Records		

=== April ===
Day	Album	Artist	Label	Notes	Ref.
10	4 Brothers 7	Frank Tiberi	Jazzed Media		

=== September ===
Day	Album	Artist	Label	Notes	Ref.
10	This Meets That	John Scofield	Universal Records		

=== Unknown date ===
#

A

- Sonic Codex by Eivind Aarset (Jazzland Recordings).

== Deaths ==
January

- 4 — Dick Wetmore, American violinist and multi-instrumentalist (born 1927).
- 12
  - Alice Coltrane, American pianist, organist, harpist, singer, and composer (born 1937).
  - Jimmy Cheatham, American trombonist (born 1924).
- 13 – Michael Brecker, American saxophonist (leukemia), Brecker Brothers (born 1949).
- 17 – Virtue Hampton Whitted, singer and bassist (born 1922).

February

- 1 — Whitney Balliett, American journalist and jazz critic (born 1926).
- 12 – Eldee Young, American upright bassist (born 1936).
- 24 – Leroy Jenkins, American violinist, violist, and composer (born 1932).
- 25 – Al Viola, American guitarist (born 1919).
- 27 – Bobby Rosengarden, American drummer (born 1924).

March

- 27 – Hitoshi Ueki, Japanese actor, comedian, singer, and guitarist (born 1926).
- 28 – Tony Scott, American clarinetist and arranger (born 1921).

April

- 1 — Danny Barcelona, American drummer (born 1929).
- 10 – Dakota Staton, American vocalist (born 1930).
- 14 – Herman Riley, American saxophonist (born 1933).
- 20 – Andrew Hill, American pianist (born 1931).
- 28 – Tommy Newsom, American saxophonist (born 1929).

May

- 6
  - Alvin Batiste, American clarinetist (born 1932).
  - Nükhet Ruacan, Turkish singer and educator in musicology ( (born 1951).
- 9 – Carla White, American vocalist (born 1951).
- 15 – Al Arsenault, American organist (born 1938).
- 24 – Buddy Childers, American trumpeter, composer, and ensemble leader (born 1926).

June

- 8 — Nellie Lutcher, American singer and pianist (born 1912).
- 18 – Bill Barder, American tubist (born 1920).

July

- 4 — Johnny Frigo, American jazz violinist and bassist (born 1916).
- 5 — George Melly, British vocalist (born 1926).
- 6 — Don Mumford, American drummer (born 1954).
- 23 – Jon Marks, American pianist (born 1947).
- 28 – Sal Mosca, American pianist (born 1927).
- 29 – Art Davis, American upright bassist (born 1934).

August

- 1 — Ronaldo Folegatti, Brazilian composer, guitarist, and record producer (born 1958).
- 5 — Paul Rutherford, English free improvising trombonist (born 1940).
- 10 – Mario Rivera, Dominican Republic saxophonist (born 1939).
- 11 – Herb Pomeroy, American trumpeter (born 1930).
- 16 – Max Roach, American drummer (born 1924).
- 18 – Jon Lucien, Virgin Islands singer and musician (born 1942).
- 27 – Doug Riley, Canadian pianist and keyboardist (born 1945).

September

- 1 — Juma Santos, percussionist and drummer (born 1948).
- 11 – Joe Zawinul, Austrian keyboardist and composer (skin cancer), Weather Report (born 1932).
- 15
  - Aldemaro Romero, Venezuelan pianist, composer, arranger, and orchestral conductor (born 1928).
  - Gordon "Specs" Powell, American drummer and percussionist (born 1922).
- 19 – Mike Osborne, English alto saxophonist, pianist, and clarinetist (born 1941).

October

- 3 — Lloyd Trotman, American upright bassist (born 1923).
- 5 — Jack Wilson, American pianist and composer (born 1936).
- 15 – Emil Mijares, Filipino vibist and pianist (born 1935).
- 17 – Teresa Brewer, American singer (born 1931).
- 21 – Donald Ayler, American trumpeter (born 1942).

November

- 16 – Grethe Kausland, Norwegian actress and singer (lung cancer) (born 1947).
- 20 – Ernest "Doc" Paulin, American musician (born 1907).
- 22 – Cecil Payne, American jazz baritone saxophonist (born 1927).

December

- 4 — Carlos Valdes, Cuban-American conga player (born 1926).
- 14 – Frank Morgan, American saxophonist (born 1933).
- 23 – Oscar Peterson, Canadian pianist (born 1925).

== See also ==
- List of 2007 albums
- List of years in jazz
- 2000s in jazz
- 2007 in music
