= 1947 in jazz =

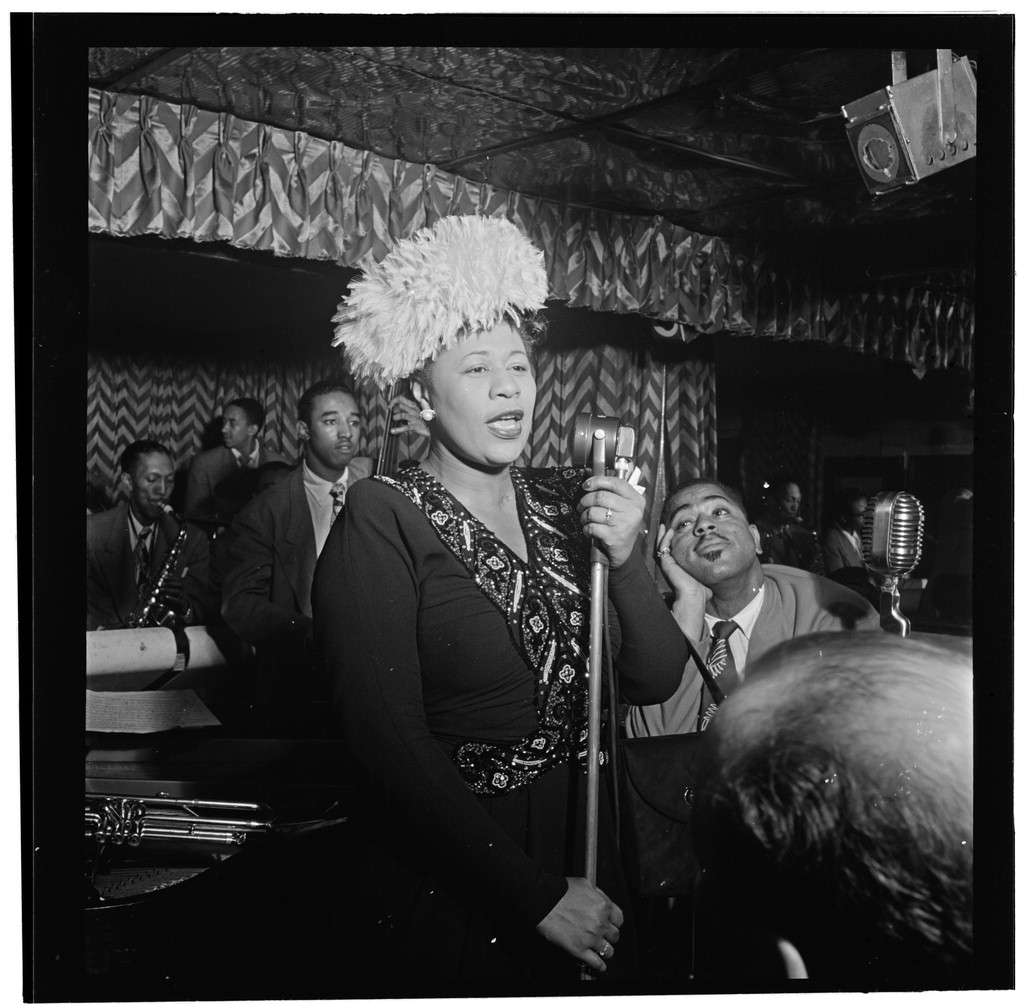
- Ella Fitzgerald, Dizzy Gillespie, Ray Brown, Milt Jackson, and Timme Rosenkrantz, Downbeat, New York, N.Y., ca. Sept. 1947
- Decade: 1940s in jazz
- Music: 1947 in music
- Standards: List of 1940s jazz standards
- See also: 1946 in jazz – 1948 in jazz

This is a timeline documenting events of Jazz in the year 1947.

== Events ==
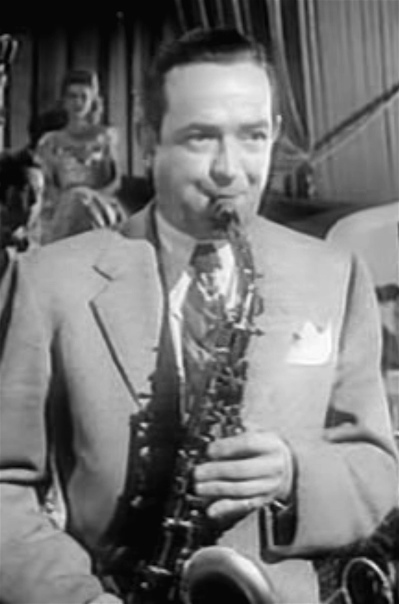
Jazz musician Jimmy Dorsey from the film The Fabulous Dorseys (1947)

- The Fabulous Dorseys is released, a fictionalized biographical film that tells the story of the Dorsey Brothers, Tommy and Jimmy, from their boyhood in Shenandoah, Pennsylvania, through their rise, their breakup, and their personal reunion.
  Standards published included "Autumn Leaves", "But Beautiful" and "Nature Boy".
- The Miles Davis All-Stars (with Charlie Parker, Max Roach, John Lewis and Nelson Boyd) debuted at the Savoy.
- Louis Armstrong performs at Carnegie Hall with his big band.
- The Count Basie Orchestra take up a summer residency at the Paradise Club in Atlantic City, New Jersey, on 27 June, agreeing to perform on lower wages. They followed with a four-week stint at the Strand Theater in Lakewood, New Jersey, supporting Billie Holiday.

== Album releases ==
- The Duel – Dexter Gordon and Teddy Edwards
- Accordion Capers – the Biviano Rhythm Sextette with John Serry Sr. & Tony Mottola

== Deaths ==
January

- 16
  - Fate Marable, American pianist and bandleader (born 1890).
  - Sonny Berman, American trumpeter (born 1925).

April

- 1 – Freddie Webster, American trumpeter (born 1916).

July

- 12 – Jimmie Lunceford, American alto saxophonist and bandleader (born 1902).

December

- 7 – Austin Wylie, American jazz bandleader (born 1893).

Unknown date

- Cee Pee Johnson, American drummer and vocalist (born 1915).

== Births ==
January

- 4 – Chris Cutler, English percussionist, composer, lyricist, and music theorist, Henry Cow.
- 6 – Fedor Frešo, Slovak bassist (died 2018).
- 9 – Nick Evans, Welsh trombonist.
- 11
  - Dee Daniels, American singer.
  - Derf Reklaw or Fred Walker, American musician, composer, and vocalist, The Pharaohs.
- 15 – Baikida Carroll, American trumpeter.

February

- 5
  - Art Lande, American pianist, drummer, composer and educator.
  - Chris Biscoe, English multi-instrumentalist.
- 10 – Butch Morris, American cornetist, composer and conductor (died 2013).
- 14 – Glenn Spearman, American tenor saxophonist (died 1998).
- 20 – Carlo Domeniconi, Italian guitarist and composer.
- 22 – Harvey Mason, American drummer.
- 24
  - Bob Magnusson, American bassist.
  - Vladimir Chekasin, Russian saxophonist and keyboarder.
- 25 – Ryo Kawasaki, Japanese guitarist.
- 26
  - Guy Klucevsek, American accordionist and composer.
  - John Horler, English pianist.

March

- 1 – Norman Connors, American drummer and composer.
- 4 – Jan Garbarek, Norwegian tenor and soprano saxophonist.
- 8 – Paul Lytton, English percussionist.
- 15
  - Jean Carne, American singer.
  - Stomu Yamashta, Japanese percussionist and keyboardist.
- 22 – Marek Blizinski, Polish guitarist and composer (died 1989).
- 23 – Ray Phiri, South African jazz fusion singer and guitarist (died 2017).
- 24 – Paul McCandless, American woodwind player and composer, Oregon.
- 28 – Paul Jackson, American bassist and composer.
- 30 – Marilyn Crispell, American pianist and composer.

April

- 1
  - Eric Ineke, Dutch drummer.
  - Frank Tusa, American upright bassist, composer, and educator.
  - Fred Nøddelund, Norwegian flugelhornist and band leader (died 2016).
- 2 – Linda Sharrock, American singer.
- 4 – Ray Russell, English guitarist, record producer, and composer.
- 11 – Frank Mantooth, American pianist and arranger (died 2004).
- 22 – Barry Guy, British composer and upright bassist.
- 23 – Alan Broadbent, American pianist, arranger and composer.
- 28
  - Glenn Zottola, American trumpeter and saxophonist.
  - Steve Khan, American guitarist.
- 30
  - Abdul Wadud, American cellist.
  - Terje Venaas, Norwegian bassist.
  - Bruce Hampton, American singer and guitarist, Hampton Grease Band (died 2017).

May

- 5 – Marty Cook, American trombonist.
- 10 – Ahmed Abdullah, American trumpeter.
- 19 – Gregory Herbert, American saxophonist and flautist (died 1978).
- 22 – Franz Koglmann, Austrian composer.
- 23 – Richie Beirach, American pianist and composer (died 2026).
- 31 – Greg Abate, American saxophonist, flautist, composer, and arranger.

June

- 8 – Julie Driscoll, English singer and actress.
- 13 – Harold Danko, American pianist.
- 14 – Darius Brubeck, American keyboardist and educator.
- 16 – Tom Malone, American trombonist.
- 21 – Junko Akimoto, Japanese singer.
- 26 – Brian Abrahams, South African drummer and vocalist.
- 30 – Jasper van 't Hof, Dutch pianist.

July

- 2 – Reggie Houston, American saxophonist.
- 3
  - John Blake Jr., American violinist (died 2014).
  - Grethe Kausland, Norwegian actress and singer (lung cancer) (died 2007).
- 11 – Jon Marks, American pianist (died 2007).
- 20 – James "Plunky" Branch, African-American performer, songwriter, and music and film producer.

August

- 15 – Gerardo Velez, Puerto Rican musician.
- 19 – Anders Bjørnstad, Norwegian trumpeter.
- 23 – Terje Rypdal, Norwegian guitarist and composer.
- 25 – Keith Tippett, British pianist and composer.

September

- 4 – Gary King, American bassist (died 2003).
- 5 – Charles "Bobo" Shaw, American drummer (died 2017).
- 6 – Bent Persson, Swedish trumpeter and cornetist.
- 15 – Wesla Whitfield, American singer (died 2018).
- 20 – Billy Bang, American violinist and composer (died 2011).
- 21 – Bern Nix, American guitarist (died 2017).

October

- 10 – Fred Hopkins, American upright bassist (died 1999).
- 11 – Mwata Bowden, American reeds player.
- 13 – Alan Wakeman, English saxophonist, Soft Machine.
- 14 – Norman Harris, American guitarist and songwriter (died 1987).
- 21 – Jerry Bergonzi, American tenor saxophonist, composer, and educator.
- 30 – Gary M. Anderson, American musician.

November

- 10 – Greg Lake, English guitarist, bassist, singer, songwriter, and music producer (died 2016).
- 14 – Buckwheat Zydeco, American accordionist and zydeco musician (lung cancer) (died 2016).
- 23 – Melton Mustafa, American trumpeter and flugelhornist, Count Basie Orchestra (died 2017).

December

- 1 – Leo Cuypers, Dutch pianist and composer (died 2017).
- 3 – Percy Jones, Welsh bass guitarist, Brand X.
- 4 – Andy LaVerne, American pianist, composer and arranger.
- 5 – Egberto Gismonti, Brazilian composer, guitarist and pianist.
- 6
  - Carlos Averhoff, Cuban tenor saxophonist (died 2016).
  - Miroslav Vitouš, Czech upright bassist.
  - Uli Beckerhoff, German composer, trumpeter, and academic.
- 8 – Gregg Allman, American singer, guitarist, pianist, and songwriter, the Allman Brothers Band (died 2017).
- 13 – Chuck Findley, American trumpeter.
- 19 – Thomas "Pae-dog" McEvoy, American hornist (died 1987).
- 21 – Paco de Lucía, Spanish guitarist, composer and producer (died 2014).
- 25 – Tomasz Szukalski, Polish saxophonist, composer, and improviser (died 2012).

Unknown date

- Bill Stevenson, Canadian pianist, vocalist and songwriter.
- Christian Escoudé, French guitarist.
- Dean Parks, American guitarist and record producer.
- Eugen Gondi, Romanian drummer.
- Ian Cruickshank, English guitarist, educator, author and columnist (died 2017).
- John James, Welsh guitarist and songwriter.
- Radu Goldis, Romanian-American guitarist and composer.

== See also ==
- 1940s in jazz
- List of years in jazz
- 1947 in music

== Bibliography ==
- The New Real Book, Volume I. Sher Music. 1988. ISBN 0-9614701-4-3.
- The New Real Book, Volume II. Sher Music. 1991. ISBN 0-9614701-7-8.
- The New Real Book, Volume III. Sher Music. 1995. ISBN 1-883217-30-X.
- The Real Book, Volume I (6th ed.). Hal Leonard. 2004. ISBN 0-634-06038-4.
- The Real Book, Volume II (2nd ed.). Hal Leonard. 2007. ISBN 978-1-4234-2452-9.
- The Real Book, Volume III (2nd ed.). Hal Leonard. 2006. ISBN 0-634-06136-4.
- The Real Jazz Book. Warner Bros. ISBN 978-91-85041-36-7.
- The Real Vocal Book, Volume I. Hal Leonard. 2006. ISBN 0-634-06080-5.
