= Janne Mark =

Danish vocalist and composer

Janne Irene Mark (born 1973) is a Danish vocalist and composer.

== Biography ==
Graduated from Rhythmic Music Conservatorium Copenhagen (RMC) and Syddansk Musikkonservatorium . She has released three albums after this, but got international recognition first with her album Pilgrim on the ACT label. Coming from a singer songwriter background she has changed direction to focus more on spiritual Nordic music and hymns. She has worked with musicians such as Arve Henriksen, Nils Økland, Verneri Pohjola, Flemming Agerskov and Gustaf Ljunggren among others. She has also collaborated with poets like Pia Tafdrup, Naja Maria Aidt and John Bell.

== Discography (in selection) ==
- 2004: Indenrigs Udenbys (Millfactory/Bonnier Music)
- 2009: Agenda (Gateway)
- 2013: Salmer fra broen (Kirkefondet)
- 2018: Pilgrim (ACT) with Arve Henriksen
- 2020: Kontinent (ACT) with Arve Henriksen
