= 2018 in jazz =

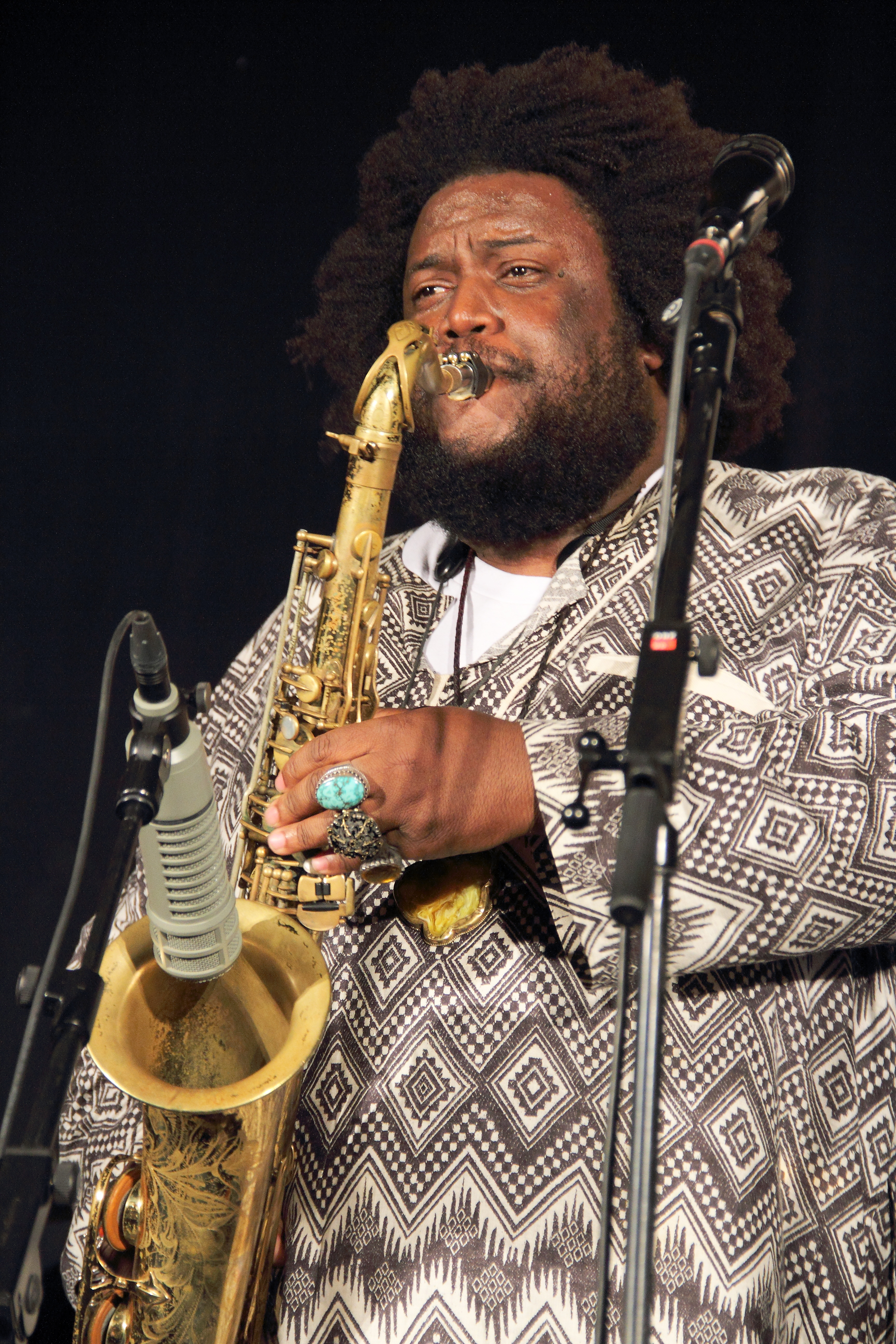
- Kamasi Washington at INNtöne Jazzfestival 2018.
- Decade: 2010s in jazz
- Music: 2018 in music
- Standards: List of jazz standards
- See also: 2017 in jazz – 2019 in jazz

This is a timeline documenting events of Jazz in the year 2018.

== Events ==
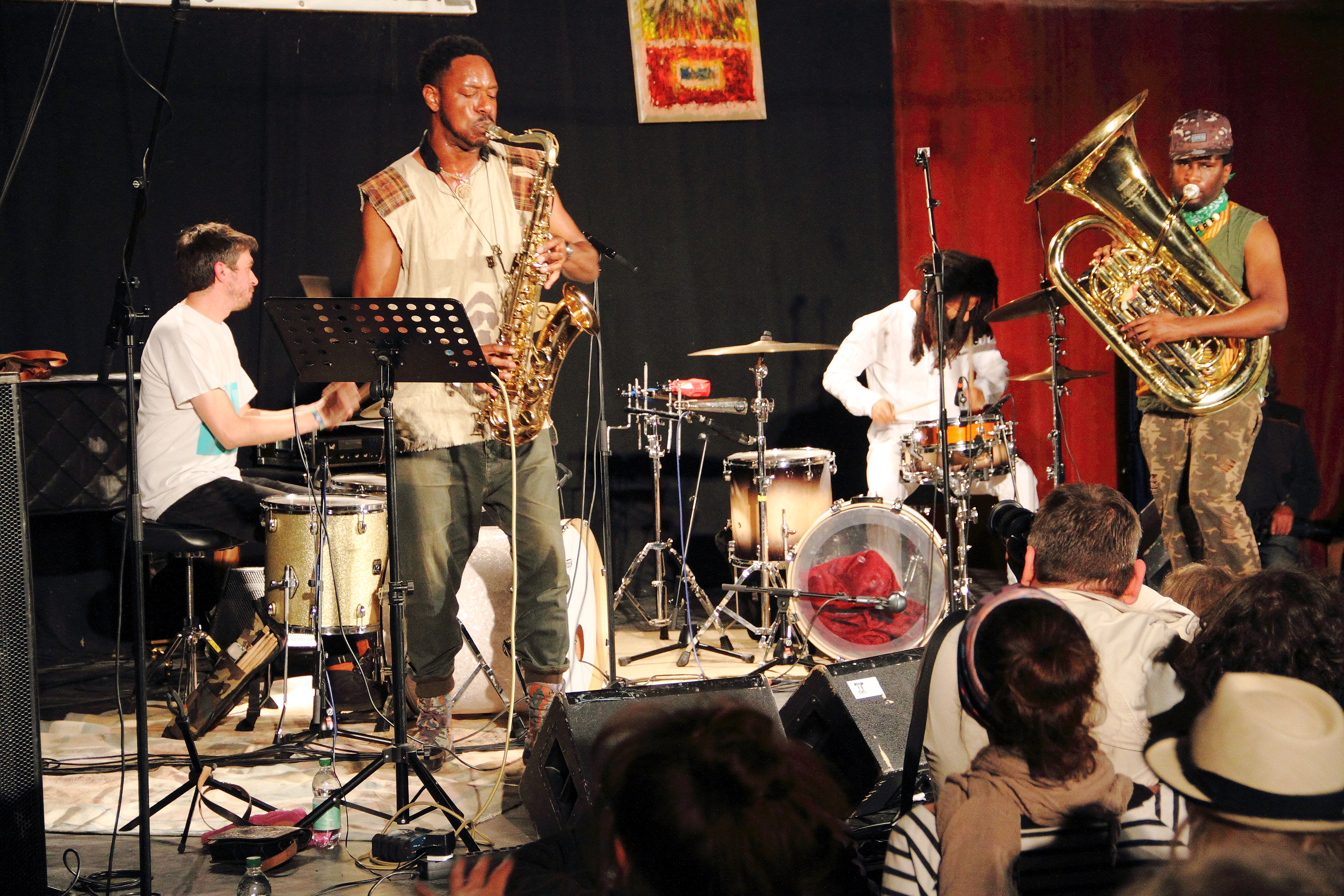
Shabaka Hutchings and Sons of Kemet at INNtöne Jazzfestival 2018

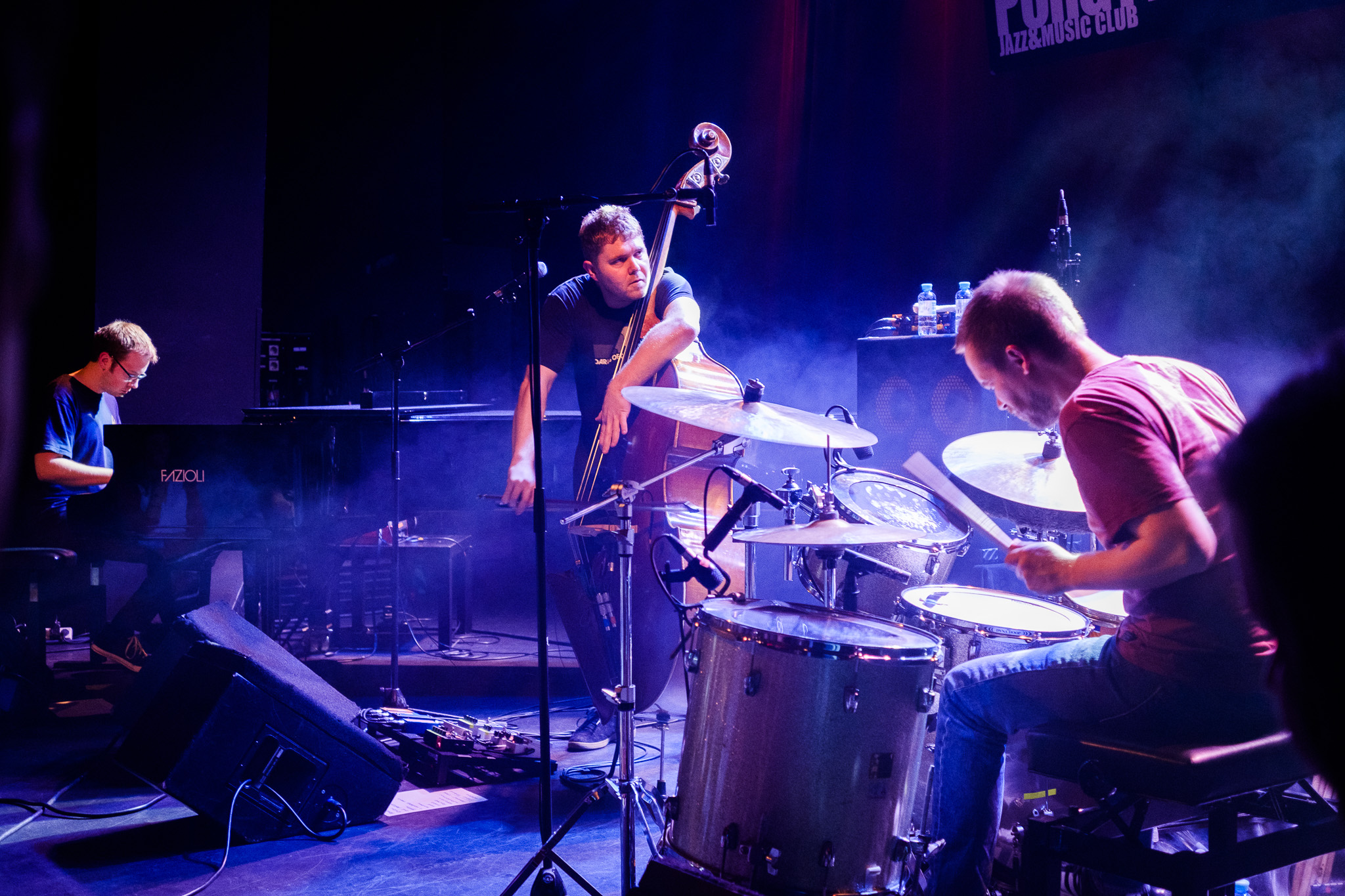
GoGo Penguin performing at a concert in Vienna, Austria

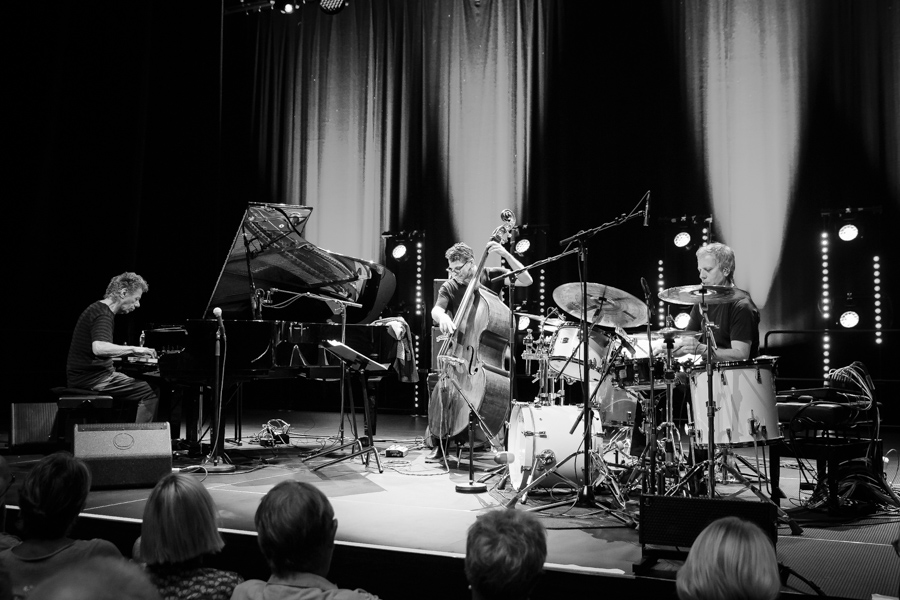
Chick Corea's Akoustic Band at the 2018 Kongsberg Jazzfestival

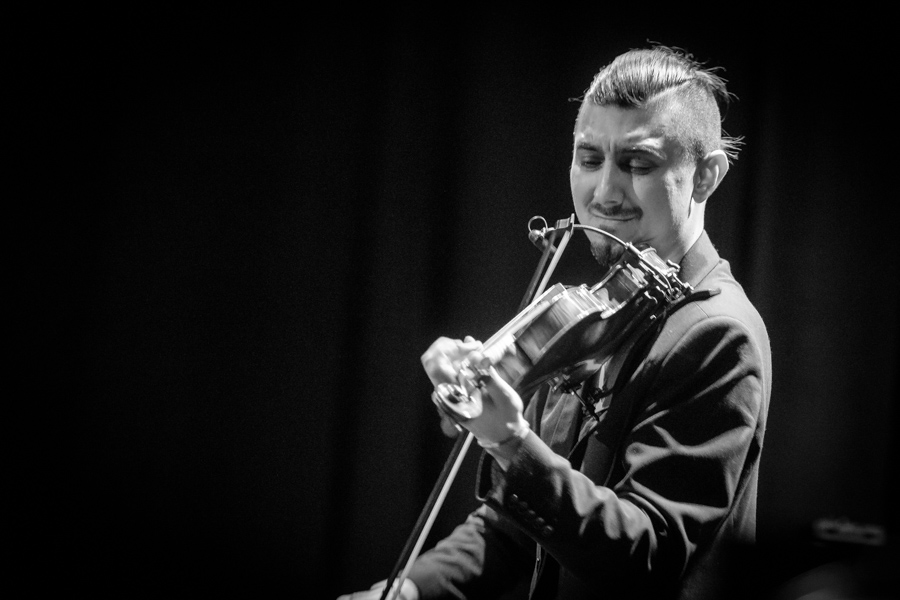
Adam Baldych 2018 at Cosmopolite, Oslo.

=== January ===
- 11
  - The 17th All Ears festival started in Oslo (January 11–14).
  - The 4th annual Tucson Jazz Festival started in Tucson, Arizona (January 11 – 21).
- 19 – The 37th annual Djangofestival started on Cosmopolite in Oslo, Norway (January 19–20).
- 28 – The Gustav Lundgren Trio performed a tribute to Django Reinhardt at Stockholm Concert Hall.
- 31
  - The 7th Bodø Jazz Open started in Bodø, Norway (January 31 – February 3).
  - The 13th Ice Music Festival started in Geilo, Norway (January 31 – February 4).

=== February ===
- 1 – The 20th Polarjazz Festival started in Longyearbyen, Svalbard (February 1 – 4).
- 23 – Kirsti Huke received the 2017 Radka Toneff Memorial Award.
- 25 – The band Hegge was awarded the 2017 jazz Spellemannprisen.

=== March ===
- 2 – The 14th Jakarta International Java Jazz Festival started in Jakarta, Indonesia (March 2 – 4).
- 8 – The Turku Jazz Festival started in Åbo (March 8 – 11).
- 16 – The Blue House Youth Jazz Festival started in Stockholm (March 16 – 18).
- 23
  - The 19th Cape Town International Jazz Festival started in Cape Town, South Africa (March 23 – 24).
  - The 45th Vossajazz started in Vossevangen, Norway (March 23 – 25). The opening was by Norwegian jazz poet Jan Erik Vold, warning about political misdirections of our time, followed by the opening concert signed Arild Andersen.

=== April ===
- 23 – The 7th Torino Jazz Festival started in Turin (April 23–30).
- 25 – The 32nd April Jazz Espoo started (April 25 – 29).
- 30 – The International Jazz Day.

=== May ===
- 4
  - The Balejazz started in Balestrand, Norway (May 4 – 6).
  - The 29th MaiJazz started in Stavanger, Norway (May 4 – 9).
- 9 – The 14th AnJazz, the Hamar Jazz Festival started at Hamar, Norway (May 9 – 13).
- 11 – The 17th All Ears festival started in Oslo (January 11–14).
- 24 – The 17th Festival Jazz à Saint-Germain-des-Prés started in Paris, France (May 24 – June 4).
- 25 – The 46th Nattjazz started in Bergen, Norway (May 25 – June 2).

=== June ===
- 12
  - The Bergenfest started in Bergen (June 12 – 16).
  - The Norwegian Wood music festival started in Oslo (June 12 – 16).

=== July ===
- 4 – The Kongsberg Jazzfestival opened at Kongsberg consert (July 4 – 7).
- 6 – The Baltic Jazz festival started in Dalsbruk (July 6 – 8).
- 7
  - The 40th Copenhagen Jazz Festival start in Copenhagen, Denmark (July 7 – 16).
  - The 22nd Skånevik Bluesfestival started in Skånevik, Norway, with Jeff Beck as headliner (July 7 – 9).
- 12 – The 17th Stavernfestivalen started in Stavern, Norway (July 12 – 14).
- 13
  - The 43rd North Sea Jazz Festival started in The Hague, Netherlands ( July 7–9).
  - The 45th Umbria Jazz Festival start in Perugia, Italy (July 13 – 22).
- 14
  - The 30th Aarhus Jazz Festival started in Aarhus, Denmark (July 14 – 21).
  - The 54th Pori Jazz Festival started in Pori, Finland (July 14 – 22).
- 16 – The Moldejazz start in Molde (July 16 – 21).
- 17
  - The 71st Nice Jazz Festival started in Nice, France (July 17 – 21).
  - The 42nd Jazz de Vitoria start in Gasteiz, Spain (July 17 – 21).
- 25 – The 23rd Canal Street started in Arendal, Norway (July 25 – 28).
- 27 – The 41st Jazz in Marciac started in Marciac, France (July 27 – August 15).

=== August ===
- 3
  - The 62nd Newport Jazz Festival started in Newport, Rhode Island (August 3 – 5).
  - The Nišville International Jazz Festival started in Niš, Serbia (August 3 – 13).
- 8
  - The 19th Øyafestivalen started in Oslo, Norway (August 8 – 11).
  - The 32nd Sildajazz started in Haugesund, Norway (August 8 – 12).
- 9 – The Tromsø Jazz Festival started in Tromsø (August 9 – 12).
- 10 – The 34th Brecon Jazz Festival started in Brecon, Wales (August 10 – 12).
- 11 – The 33rd Oslo Jazzfestival started in Oslo, Norway (August 11 – 18).
- 17 – The Parkenfestivalen started in Bodø (August 17–18).
- 30 – The 14th Punktfestivalen opened in Kristiansand (August 30 - September 1|).

=== September ===
- 21 – The 61st Monterey Jazz Festival started in Monterey, California (September 21 – 23).

=== October ===
- 17 – The 54th Prague International Jazz Festival started in Prague (March 17 – October 6).
- 18 – The 36th DølaJazz started in Lillehammer (October 18 – 21).
- 22 – Vocalist Veronica Swift, the daughter of singer Stephanie Nakasian and the late pianist Hod O'Brien, was attacked on subway platform in New York City.
- 25 – The 40th Guinness Cork Jazz Festival started in Cork City, Ireland (October 25 – 29).

=== November ===
- 1 – The 55th JazzFest Berlin, also known as the Berlin Jazz Festival started in Berlin (November 1 – 4).
- 7 - The Thelonius Monk Institute of Jazz is renamed the Herbie Hancock Institute of Jazz after its longtime board chairman

=== December ===
- The 24th Umbria Jazz Winter started in Orvieto, Italy (December 20 - January 1).

== Albums released ==
Month	Day	Album	Artist	Label	Notes	Ref.
January	5	Contra Puncta	CMC Ensemble feat. Michel Godard	Losen	Produced by C.M.C. Ensemble	
January	19	Contra La Indecisión	Bobo Stenson Trio (Anders Jormin, Jon Fält)	ECM	Produced by Manfred Eicher	
January	19	Elvesang	Sigurd Hole	Elvesang		
January	19	Never Stop II	The Bad Plus			
January	19	Invisible Threads	John Surman with Nelson Ayres and Rob Waring	ECM	Produced by Manfred Eicher	
January	19	Lucus	Thomas Strønen & Time Is A Blind Guide	ECM	Produced by Manfred Eicher	
January	19	Obsidian	Kit Downes	ECM		
January	26	Cinema Scenes	Klaus Paier - Asja Valcic	ACT		
January	26	Laila Biali	Laila Biali	ACT	Produced by Ben Wittman & Laila Biali	
January	26	Octopus	Kris Davis & Craig Taborn	Pyroclastic Records	Produced by David Breskin	
January	26	Rousilvo	Dine Doneff	ECM		
January	31	Sparkling	Tom Ibarra	Tom Ibarra		
February	2	Cosmic Playground	Chris Gall Trio	Edition Collage		
February	2	Delights Of Decay	Batagraf	Jazzland	Produced by Jon Balke, Kåre Christoffer Vestrheim	
February	2	Live at Victoria	Solveig Slettahjell	Jazzland	Produced by Solveig Slettahjell	
February	2	Modern Lore	Julian Lage	Mack Avenue		
February	9	A Humdrum Star	GoGo Penguin	Blue Note		
February	9	Joy Ride	John Raymond & Real Feel	Sunnyside		
February	9	Live in Europe	Melody Gardot	Decca		
February	9	Thought You Knew	Snowpoet (Lauren Kinsella, Chris Hyson)	Edition Records		
February	9	Twio	Walter Smith III Trio	Whirlwind		
February	13	Heat	Knut Reiersrud Band	Jazzland		
February	16	Descansado - Songs for Film	Norma Winstone	ECM	Produced by Manfred Eicher	
February	16	For 2 Akis	Shinya Fukumori Trio	ECM	Produced by Manfred Eicher	
February	16	Romaria	Andy Sheppard Quartet	ECM	Produced by Manfred Eicher	
February	16	Run Boy, Run	Gurls (Hanna Paulsberg, Ellen Andrea Wang, Rohey Taalah)	Grappa	GRCD4571	
February	16	Travelers	Nicolas Masson, Colin Vallon, Patrice Moret, Lionel Friedli	ECM	Produced by Manfred Eicher	
February	23	A Novel Of Anomaly	Andreas Schaerer	ACT	Produced by Siggi Loch	
February	23	Lala Belu	Hailu Mergia	Awesome Tapes from Africa		
February	23	Opus	Al Di Meola	earMUSIC		
February	23	Pilgrim	Janne Mark with Arve Henriksen	ACT	Produced by Esben Eyermann and Janne Mark	
February	26	Animal Image	Verneri Pohjola, Mika Kallio	Edition		
February	28	Visions: Coast to Coast Connection	Bob Holz feat. Stanley Clarke	MVD Audio		
March	2	After the Fall	Keith Jarrett, Gary Peacock, Jack DeJohnette	ECM		
March	2	Ravensburg	Mathias Eick	ECM	Produced by Manfred Eicher	
March	3	Toilet	Clown Core	Self Released	Unknown Producer	
March	9	Atonement	Bendik Hofseth	C+C Records	Jazz	
March	9	Joy	Karin Krog	Meantime Records	Jazz (vinyl)	
March	9	Traces of You	Kristin Asbjørnsen	Global Sonics / Øra		
March	23	In-House Science	Arild Andersen with Paolo Vinaccia, and Tommy Smith	ECM		
March	23	Oslo	Michael Wollny, feat. The Norwegian Wind Ensemble and Geir Lysne	ACT	Produced by Siggi Loch	
March	23	Notis	Kjersti Stubø Quintet including additional Jørn Øien, Håvard Stubø, Mats Eilertsen, and Håkon Mjåset Johansen	Bolage		
March	23	Powered By Life	Dalia Faitelson	Losen	Produced by Dalia Faitelson	
March	23	Returnings	Jakob Bro with Palle Mikkelborg, Thomas Morgan, and Jon Christensen	ECM	Produced by Manfred Eicher	
March	23	Wartburg	Michael Wollny Trio Live	ACT	Produced by Siggi Loch	
March	23	The Questions	Kurt Elling	Okeh Records	with Marquis Hill, Branford Marsalis, and Jeff "Tain" Watts.	
March	30	Your Queen Is a Reptile	Sons of Kemet	Impulse! Records		
April	6	Breaking English	Rafiq Bhatia	Anti- Records		
April	6	Polarity	Hoff Ensemble - Jan Gunnar Hoff, Anders Jormin, Audun Kleive	2L	Produced by Morten Lindberg	
April	20	Barxeta II	Per Mathisen & Jan Gunnar Hoff feat. Horacio "El Negro" Hernandez	Losen	Produced by Jan Gunnar Hoff and Per Mathisen	
April	20	Freedoms Trio II	Steinar Aadnekvam	Losen	Produced by Steinar Aadnekvam	
April	20	Kudu	Anteloper (Jaimie Branch, Jason Nazary)	International Anthem Recording Company	Produced by Jaimie Branch, Jason Nazary	
April	20	Swagism	Ghost-Note	Ropeadope Records		
May	18	A Suite of Poems	Ketil Bjørnstad, Anneli Drecker, poems by Lars Saabye Christensen	ECM		
May	25	Still Dreaming	Joshua Redman, Ron Miles, Scott Colley, Brian Blade	Nonesuch	Produced by Joshua Redman	
June	15	Open Land - Meeting John Abercrombie	John Abercrombie	ECM	DVD	
June	22	Heaven and Earth	Kamasi Washington	Young Turk Recordings		
July	18	e.s.t. songbook - Volume 2 - Buch	Esbjörn Svensson Trio	ACT		
August	31	Helsinki Songs	Trygve Seim	ECM		
August	31	Living Being II - Night Walker	Vincent Peirani	ACT	Produced by Vincent Peirani	
August	31	The Other Side	Tord Gustavsen Trio	ECM		
September	7	Temporary Kings	Mark Turner and Ethan Iverson	ECM		
September	14	Marcin Wasilewski Trio Live	Marcin Wasilewski Trio	ECM		
September	28	The Dream Thief	Shai Maestro, Jorge Roeder, and Ofri Nehemya	ECM	Produced by Manfred Eicher	
September	28	The Window	Cécile McLorin Salvant	Mack Avenue Records		
September	28	Summerwind	Lars Danielsson	ACT	Produced by Siggi Loch	
October	5	Bay Of Rainbows	Jakob Bro, Thomas Morgan, and Joey Baron	ECM		
October	5	Where The River Goes	Wolfgang Muthspiel, Ambrose Akinmusire, Brad Mehldau, Larry Grenadier, and Eric Harland	ECM	Produced by Manfred Eicher	
October	12	Crime Zone	Connie Han	Mack Avenue Records		
October	19	La Fenice	Keith Jarrett	ECM		
October	19	12 Little Spells	Esperanza Spalding	Concord Records	Awarded Grammy Award for Best Jazz Vocal Album at the 62nd Annual Grammy Awards	
October	26	Universal Beings	Makaya McCraven	International Anthem Recordings		
October	26	Christmas With My Friends VI	Nils Landgren	ACT	Produced by Nils Landgren with Johan Norberg	
October	26	My Soul Kitchen	Ida Sand	ACT	Produced by Nils Landgren and Siggi Loch	
November	2	Lebroba	Andrew Cyrille, Wadada Leo Smith, and Bill Frisell	ECM		
November	2	Lucent Waters	Florian Weber, Ralph Alessi, Linda May Han Oh, and Nasheet Waits	ECM	Produced by Manfred Eicher	
November	9	The Art Ensemble of Chicago and Associated Ensembles	Art Ensemble of Chicago	ECM	21xCD	

== All critically reviewed albums ranked ==
=== AnyDecentMusic ===
Number	Artist	Album	Average score	Number of reviews	Reference
1	Kamasi Washington	Heaven and Earth	8.3	29 reviews	
2	Jon Hassel	Listening To Pictures (Pentimento Volume One)	7.8	10 reviews	
3	Kadhja Bonet	Childqueen	7.8	10 reviews	
4	Kamaal Williams	The Return	7.5	6 reviews	
5	Unknown Mortal Orchestra	IC-01 Hanoi	6.2	10 reviews	

=== Metacritic ===
Number	Artist	Album	Average score	Number of reviews	Reference
1	John Coltrane	Both Directions at Once: The Lost Album	90	11 reviews	
2	Miles Davis	The Final Tour: The Bootleg Series, Vol. 6 [Box Set]	87	5 reviews	
3	Entourage	Ceremony of Dreams: Studio Sessions and Outtakes 1972-1977 [Box Set]	87	4 reviews	
4	Kamasi Washington	Heaven And Earth	86	22 reviews	
5	Makaya McCraven	Universal Beings	86	5 reviews	
6	Sons of Kemet	Your Queen Is a Reptile	81	12 reviews	

== Deaths ==
=== January ===
- 4 – Ray Thomas, British flautist and singer, The Moody Blues (born 1941).
- 14
  - Bill Hughes, American trombonist and bandleader (born 1930).
  - Marlene VerPlanck, American singer (born 1933).
- 20 – Terry Evans, American singer and guitarist (born 1937).
- 22 – Billy Hancock, American singer, guitarist, bassist, and multiinstrumentalist (born 1946).
- 23 – Hugh Masekela, South African trumpeter, singer, and composer (born 1939).
- 25 – Tommy Banks, Canadian pianist (born 1936).
- 28
  - Eddie Shaw, American saxophonist (born 1937).
  - Coco Schumann, German guitarist (born 1924).
- 29 – Asmund Bjørken, Norwegian accordionist and saxophonist (born 1933).

=== February ===
- 3 – Leon "Ndugu" Chancler, American drummer (born 1952).
- 5 – Ove Stokstad, Norwegian printmaker, clarinetist and saxophonist (born 1939).
- 7 – John Perry Barlow, American lyricist, poet, and essayist (born 1925).
- 8 – Algia Mae Hinton, American guitarist and singer (born 1929).
- 9 – Wesla Whitfield, American singer (born 1947).
- 11 – Vic Damone, American singer, songwriter, and actor (born 1928).
- 18 – Didier Lockwood, French violinist, Magma (born 1956).
- 22 – Errol Buddle, Australian bassoonist and saxophonist (born 1928).

=== March ===
- 4 – Russell Solomon, American entrepreneur, art collector, and founder of the Tower Records (born 1925).
- 7 – Jerzy Milian, Polish vibraphonist (born 1935).
- 12 – Olly Wilson, American composer, pianist, upright bassist, and musicologist (born 1937).
- 16 – Buell Neidlinger, American upright bassist and cellist (born 1936).
- 22 – Morgana King, American singer and actress (born 1930).
- 29 Jimmy Woods, American alto saxophonist (born 1934).

=== April ===
- 1 – Audrey Morris, American singer and pianist (born 1928).
- 3 – Lill-Babs or Barbro Svensson, Swedish singer and actress (born 1938).
- 5 – Cecil Taylor, American pianist and poet (born 1929).
- 8 – Nathan Davis, American saxophonist, flautist, and multi-instrumentalist (born 1937).
- 11 – Jim Caine, British pianist and radio presenter (born 1926).
- 12 – Gyula Babos, Hungarian guitarist (born 1949).
- 14 – Brian Rolland, American guitarist, composer, and songwriter (born 1954).
- 16 – Dona Ivone Lara, Brazilian samba singer (born 1921).
- 17 – Peter Guidi, Scottish saxophonist and flutist (born 1949).
- 23 – Bob Dorough, American pianist, composer, and vocalese singer (born 1923).
- 26 – Charles Neville, American R&B saxophonist, The Neville Brothers (born 1938).
- 27 – Gildo Mahones, American pianist (born 1929).
- 28 – Brooks Kerr, American pianist (born 1951).

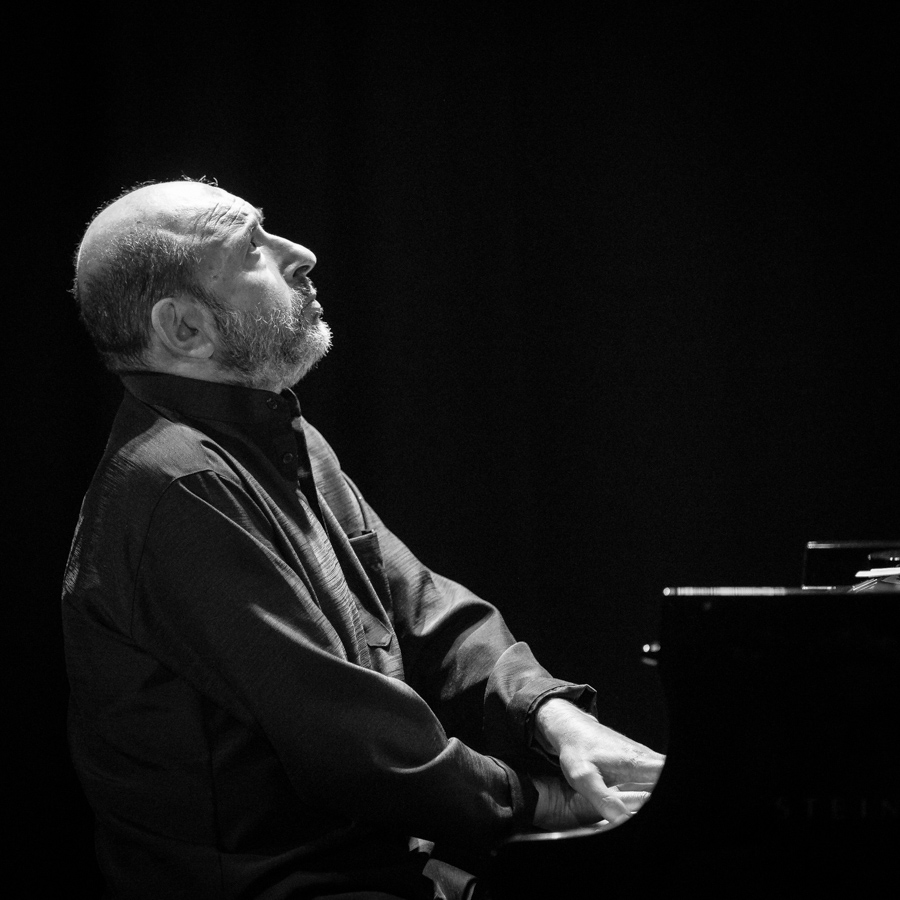
Mikhail Alperin in 2017.

=== May ===
- 1 – John "Jabo" Starks, American drummer (born 1938).
- 11 – Mikhail Alperin, Ukrainian born pianist, Moscow Art Trio (born 1956).
- 17 – Jon Sholle, American guitarist and multi-instrumentalist (born 1948).
- 18 – Jack Reilly, American pianist (born 1932).
- 19 – Reggie Lucas, American guitarist and songwriter (born 1953).

=== June ===
- 4 – Norman Edge, American upright bassist (born 1934).
- 5 – Brian Browne, Canadian pianist and composer (born 1937).
- 9 – Lorraine Gordon, American jazz music advocate, Village Vanguard jazz club (born 1922).
- 11 – Wayne Dockery, American bassist (born 1941).
- 12 – Jon Hiseman, British drummer, recording engineer, and record producer, Colosseum, Colosseum II, John Mayall & the Bluesbreakers (born 1944).
- 13 – D. J. Fontana, American drummer (born 1931).
- 15 – Matt Murphy, American guitarist, The Blues Brothers (born 1929).
- 17 – Rebecca Parris, American singer (born 1951).
- 21 – Bob Bain, American guitarist (born 1924).
- 26
  - Big Bill Bissonnette, American trombonist, drummer and producer (born 1937).
  - Fedor Frešo, Slovak bassist (born 1947).

=== July ===
- 2
  - Henry Butler, American pianist (born 1948).
  - Bill Watrous, American trombonist (born 1939).
- 8 – Tab Hunter, American actor, singer, and author (born 1931).
- 15 – Theryl DeClouet, American singer, Galactic (born 1951).
- 23 – Duke Carl Gregor of Mecklenburg, member of the House of Mecklenburg-Strelitz and a music and art historian (born 1933).
- 25 – Patrick Williams, American composer, arranger, and conductor (born 1939).
- 29 – Tomasz Stanko, Polish trumpeter and composer (born 1942).

=== August ===
- 10 – Ken Pickering, Canadian jazz promoter, Vancouver Jazz Festival co-founder (born 1952).
- 16 – Aretha Franklin, American singer and songwriter (born 1942).
- 18 – Jack Costanzo, American percussionist (born 1919).
- 22 – Lazy Lester, American singer and guitarist (born 1933).

=== September ===
- 1 – Randy Weston, American pianist and composer (born 1926).
- 12 – Erich Kleinschuster, Austrian trombonist and bandleader (born 1930).
- 14 – Max Bennett, American bassist, L.A. Express, The Wrecking Crew (born 1928).
- 16
  - Maartin Allcock, British multi-instrumentalist, Fairport Convention, Jethro Tull (born 1957).
  - Big Jay McNeely, American saxophonist (born 1927).
- 29 – Otis Rush, American singer and guitarist (born 1935).

=== October ===
- 1 – Jerry González, American trumpeter (born 1949).
- 3 – John Von Ohlen, American drummer, Blue Wisp Big Band (born 1941).
- 4 – Hamiet Bluiett, American saxophonist, World Saxophone Quartet (born 1940).
- 10 – Theresa Hightower, African-American singer (born 1954).
- 17 – Chuck Wilson, American saxophonist (born 1948).
- 25 – Sonny Fortune, American saxophonist (born 1939).
- 27 – Fred Hess, American tenor saxophonist (born 1944).

=== November ===
- 2 – Roy Hargrove, American trumpeter (born 1969).
- 15 – Ivan Smirnov, Russian guitarist (born 1955).
- 25 – Shep Shepherd, American drummer and trombonist (born 1917).
- 27 – Johnny Maddox, American pianist (born 1927).
- 28
  - Norio Maeda, Japanese composer and pianist (born 1934).
  - Roger Neumann, American saxophonist, flutist, and composer (born 1941).

=== December ===
- 1 – Calvin Newborn, American guitarist (born 1933).
- 2 – Perry Robinson, American clarinetist and composer (born 1938).
- 7 – The Mascara Snake or Victor Hayden, American avant-garde clarinetist, Captain Beefheart and His Magic Band (born 1948).
- 13 – Nancy Wilson, American singer (born 1937).
- 15 – Arthur Maia, Brazilian jazz and samba bassist and composer (born 1962).
- 30 – Miúcha, Brazilian singer and composer (born 1937).
- 31 – Urbie Green, American trombonist (born 1926).

== See also ==
- List of 2018 albums
- List of jazz festivals
- List of years in jazz
- 2010s in jazz
- 2018 in music
