= 1937 in jazz =

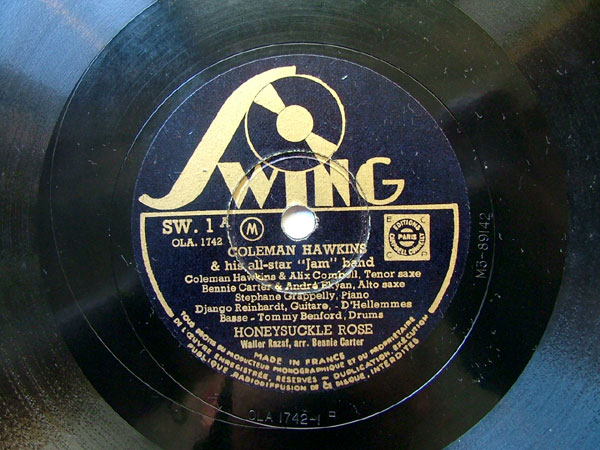
- Honeysuckle Rose Django Reinhardt – Coleman Hawkins – Benny Carter – Paris session 1937
- Decade: 1930s in jazz
- Music: 1937 in music
- Standards: List of 1930s jazz standards
- See also: 1936 in jazz – 1938 in jazz

This is a timeline documenting events of Jazz in the year 1937.

== Events ==
- Charlie Parker starts collaboration with pianist Jay McShann, and plays in his band in Kansas City from time to time until 1941.

== Deaths ==
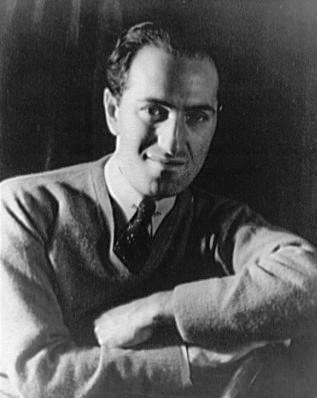
George Gershwin 28 March 1937, only months before his death

February

- 1– Alex Hill American pianist (born 1906).

March

- 15– Ward Pinkett, American jazz trumpeter (born 1906).

July

- 11– George Gershwin, American composer and pianist (born 1898).

August

- 20– Johnny Dunn, American trumpeter and vaudeville performer (born 1897).

September

- 26– Bessie Smith, American blues singer, nicknamed the "Empress of the Blues" (car accident in Clarksdale, Mississippi) (born 1894).

== Births ==
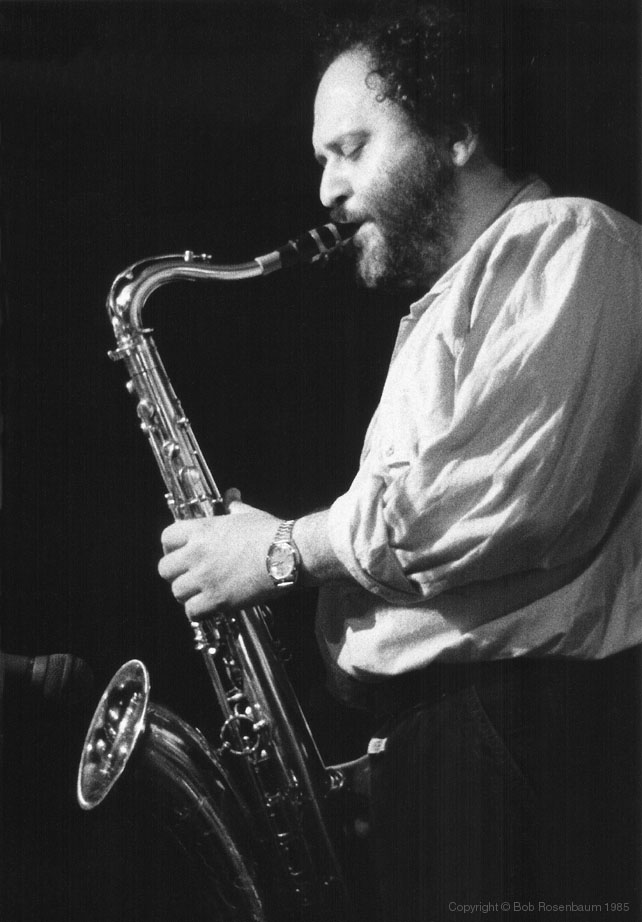
Saxophonest Joe Farrell in performance at Lush Life in New York, 1985. Photograph by Bob Rosenbaum

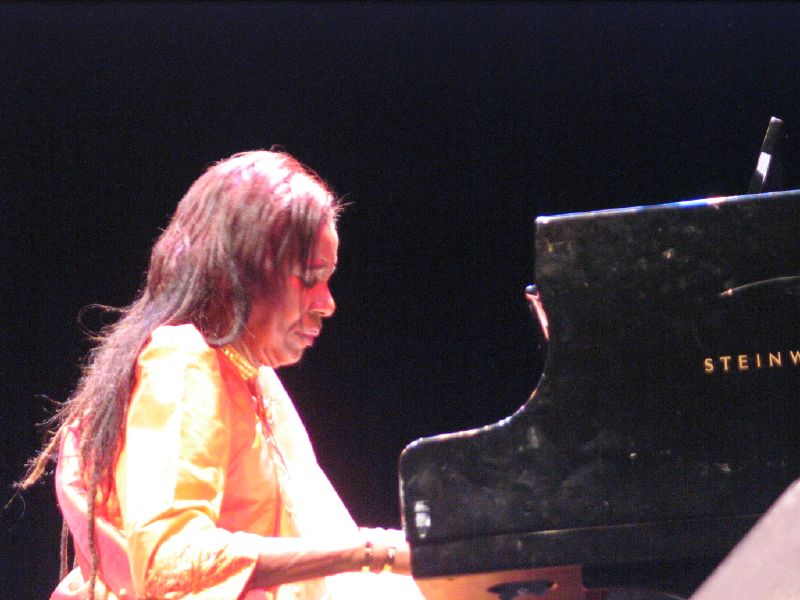
Alice Coltrane 2006

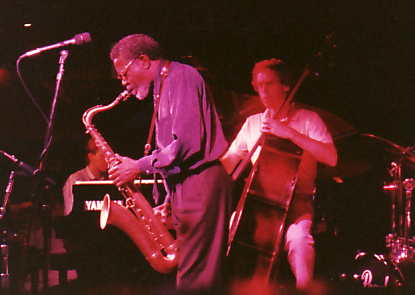
Joe Henderson with Neil Swainson, bass, at Harpo's, Victoria.

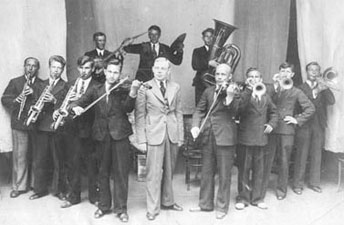
The Orchestra of Valentin Sporius, 1937, Kuybyshev

January

- 1 – Neville Dickie, English pianist.
- 6 – Paolo Conte, Italian singer, pianist, composer, and lawyer.
- 9 – Malcolm Cecil, British bassist (died 2021).
- 17 – Ted Dunbar, American guitarist, composer, and educator (died 1998).
- 19 – Phil Wilson, American trombonist.
- 29 – Jeff Clyne, British bassist (died 2009).

February

- 1 – Erik Amundsen, Norwegian upright bassist (died 2015).
- 3 – Bobby Durham, American drummer (died 2008).
- 5 – Big Bill Bissonnette, American trombonist, drummer and producer (died 2018).
- 9 – Len Skeat, English upright bassist.(died 2021)
- 10 – Ed Polcer, American cornetist.
- 11 – Brian Lemon, British pianist and arranger (died 2014).
- 15
  - Kirk Lightsey, American pianist.
  - Nathan Davis, American saxophonist, flautist, and multi-instrumentalist (died 2018).
- 19
  - Fred Van Hove, Belgian pianist, accordionist, church organist, carillonist, and composer (died 2022).
  - Robert Walker, American guitarist (died 2017).
- 20 – Nancy Wilson, American singer (died 2018).
- 21 – Graham Collier, English bassist, bandleader and composer (died 2011).
- 25 – Don Randi, American keyboarder, bandleader and songwriter.

March

- 4 – Barney Wilen, French saxophonist and composer (died 1996).
- 5 – Carol Sloane, American singer (died 2023).
- 7 – Roy Williams, English trombonist.
- 12 – Janne Carlsson, Swedish drummer and actor (died 2017).
- 16 – Brian Browne, Canadian pianist and composer (died 2018).
- 20 – Eddie Shaw, American saxophonist (died 2018).
- 24 – Billy Stewart, American singer (died 1970).
- 31 – Rafig Babayev, Azerbaijani musician and composer (died 1994).

April

- 3 – Louis Satterfield, American bassist and trombonist, The Pharaohs (died 2004).
- 6 – Gene Bertoncini, American guitarist.
- 11 – Bud Brisbois, American trumpeter (died 1978).
- 13 – J. R. Mitchell, American drummer (died 2004).
- 22 – Jack Nitzsche, American saxophonist and pianist (died 2000).
- 24
  - Joe Henderson, American tenor saxophonist (died 2001).
  - Spanky DeBrest, American bassist (died 1973).

May

- 4 – Ron Carter, American upright bassist.
- 10 – Mike Melvoin, American pianist, composer, and arranger (died 2012).
- 15 – Karin Krog, Norwegian vocalist.
- 24
  - Archie Shepp, American saxophonist.
  - Charly Antolini, Swiss drummer.
- 26 – Neil Ardley, English pianist and composer (died 2004).
- 30 – Claes Andersson, Finland-Swedish pianist, psychiatrist, author, and poet (died 2019).
- 31 – Louis Hayes, American drummer.

June

- 2 – Pierre Favre, Swiss drummer and percussionist.
- 3 – Grachan Moncur III, American trombonist (died 2022).
- 4 – Mark Whitecage, American saxophonist (died 2021).
- 8 – Toni Harper, American singer (died 2023).
- 13 – Frank Strozier, American alto saxophonist.
- 14 – Burton Greene, American pianist (died 2021).
- 22 – Bernie McGann, Australian alto saxophonist (died 2013).
- 23 – Elza Soares, Brazilian singer and samba recording artist (died 2022).
- 26 – Reggie Workman, American upright bassist.
- 30 – Börje Fredriksson, Swedist tenor saxophonist (died 1968).

July

- 22 – Bob Downes, English flautist and saxophonist.
- 27 – Charlie Shoemake, American vibraphonist.
- 30 – James Spaulding, American alto saxophonist and flautist.

August

- 6
  - Baden Powell, Brazilian guitarist (died 2000).
  - Charlie Haden, American upright bassist (died 2014).
- 7 – George Bohanon, American trombonist.
- 14
  - Barbara Jay, British singer.
  - Terry Evans, American singer and guitarist (died 2018).
- 17 – Guitar Gable, American singer, guitarist, and songwriter (died 2017).
- 27 – Alice Coltrane, American pianist, organist, harpist and composer (died 2007).
- 31 – Gunter Hampel, German vibraphonist, clarinetist, saxophonist, flautist, pianist and composer.

September

- 3 – Larry Ridley, American bassist and music educator.
- 4 – Gene Ludwig, American organist (died 2010).
- 6 – Bosse Broberg, Swedish trumpeter and composer.
- 7 – Olly Wilson, American composer, pianist, double bassist, and musicologist (died 2018).
- 8 – Joe Gallivan, American drummer, percussion, and synthesizer player.
- 14 – Joseph Jarman, American saxophonist, Art Ensemble of Chicago (died 2019).
- 20 – Monica Zetterlund, Swedish singer and actress (died 2005).
- 25
  - Horace Arnold, American drummer.
  - Michael Gibbs, Rhodesian composer, trombonist, and keyboardist.
- 27 – Guido Basso, Canadian trumpeter (died 2023).

October

- 4 – Leon Thomas, American singer (died 1999).
- 19 – John Crocker, English clarinettist and saxophonist.

November

- 6 – Gordon Brisker, American tenor saxophonist (died 2004).
- 27 – Wilber Morris, American upright bassist and bandleader (died 2002).
- 30 – Miúcha, Brazilian singer and composer (died 2018).

December

- 4 – Ernie Carson, American cornetist, pianist and singer (died 2012).
- 6 – Eddie Gladden, American drummer (died 2003).
- 7 – Mike Carr, English organist, pianist and vibraphonist (died 2017).
- 11 – Beegie Adair, American pianist (died 2022).
- 16 – Joe Farrell, American saxophonist and flautist (died 1986).
- 19 – Milcho Leviev, Bulgarian composer, arranger, and pianist (died 2019.
- 24 – Bernt Rosengren, Swedist tenor saxophonist (died 2023).

Unknown date

- Barry Vercoe, Zealand-born computer scientist and composer.
- Bill Cole, American musician, professor of music, and author.
- Brad Terry, American clarinetist and whistler.
- Humberto Clayber, Brazilian composer and musician.

== See also ==
- 1937 in music
