= Shinya Fukumori =

Japanese jazz drummer and composer (born 1984)

- Born: 5 January 1984 (age 42); Osaka
- Origin: Japan
- Genres: Jazz
- Occupations: Musician, drummer, composer, producer
- Instrument: Drums
- Labels: ECM Records, nagalu
- Website: www.shinyafukumori.com

Shinya Fukumori (福盛 進也, Fukumori Shin'ya; born 5 January 1984 in Osaka) is a Japanese jazz drummer and composer.

== Biography ==
Fukumori moved to the United States to study music when he was 17 years old. He finished his musical studies at Berklee College of Music in Boston, where he received several awards, before he relocated to Munich, Germany in 2013. He released his debut solo album For 2 Akis with his own trio, including saxophonist Matthieu Bordenave and pianist Walter Lang, on the ECM label in 2018. In 2020, Fukumori established his own label NAGALU and produced his second album Another Story.

== Discography ==
=== Solo albums ===
- 2018: For 2 Akis (ECM Records, ECM 2574)
- 2020: Another Story (nagalu, NAGALU 001/002)

=== Collaborations ===
With Florian Brandl

- 2015: Rejuvenation (Timezone, TZ 419)

With Carolyn Breuer's Shoot The Piano Player!

- 2015: Volume 1 (NotNowMom! Records)

With Matthieu Bordenave Grand Angle

- 2017: Terre De Sienne (Enja Records, ENJ-9650)
