= Steve Harris (drummer) =

English jazz drummer and composer

Stephen John Harris (16 August 1948 – 11 January 2008) was an English jazz drummer and composer.

== Career ==
Born in Mansfield in Nottinghamshire, he took up drums at the age of 14 and was soon playing in pop and soul bands. Harris was a replacement drummer for The Rolling Stones on several occasions in 1962 when Tony Chapman was unavailable due to work.

In the late 1960s he was a member of the progressive rock band Woody Kern who recorded on Pye Records.

From 1987 onwards, Harris was a member of the Nottingham-based band Pinski Zoo, who blended free jazz with funk.

In 2001 he formed the group Zaum, named after the Russian Futurist concept Zaum. Their 2004 recording Above Our Heads the Sky Splits Open is highly regarded, achieving a 5-star rating in The Penguin Guide to Jazz. Zaum's final recording before his death was the octet record "I hope you never love anything as much as I love you".

Harris died on 11 January 2008 in Dorchester, Dorset.
