= Bill Saragih =

Indonesian jazz musician (1933–2008)

Bill Amirsjah-Rondahaim Saragih (January 1, 1933, in North Sumatra – January 29, 2008) was an Indonesian jazz musician. His albums includes songs such as Billy's Groove and original songs include Anna My Love, which was dedicated to his wife.
