= List of American jazz drummers =

This is a list of American jazz drummers. Jazz drummers play percussion (predominantly the drum set) in jazz, jazz fusion, and other jazz subgenres such as latin jazz. The techniques and instrumentation of this type of performance have evolved over the 1900s, influenced by jazz at large and the individual drummers within it. Jazz required a method of playing percussion different from traditional European styles, one that was easily adaptable to the different rhythms of the new genre, fostering the creation of jazz drumming's hybrid technique. As each period in the evolution of jazz—swing and bebop, for example—tended to have its own rhythmic style, jazz drumming continued to evolve along with the music. In the 1970s and 1980s, jazz drumming incorporated elements of rock and Latin styles.

== American jazz drummers ==
=== A ===
- Clarence Acox, Jr.
- Leo Adde
- Henry Adler
- Pheeroan akLaff
- Mousey Alexander
- Muhammad Ali
- Rashied Ali
- Don Alias
- Carl Allen
- Barry Altschul
- Danny Alvin
- Robby Ameen
- Scott Amendola
- Leon Anderson
- Horace Arnold
- Joe Ascione
- Cuba Austin

=== B ===
- Dave Bailey
- Donald Bailey
- Butch Ballard
- Jeff Ballard
- Louis Barbarin
- Paul Barbarin
- Danny Barcelona
- Thurman Barker
- Joey Baron
- Ray Barretto
- Lionel Batiste
- Bobby Battle
- Ray Bauduc
- Ronnie Bedford
- Poogie Bell
- Louie Bellson
- Tommy Benford
- Jimmy Bennington
- Black Benny
- Bill Berg
- Dick Berk
- Steve Berrios
- Vic Berton
- Jimmy Bertrand
- Denzil Best
- John Betsch
- Chief Bey
- Tony Bianco
- Wallace Bishop
- Gregg Bissonette
- Jim Black
- Cindy Blackman
- Ed Blackwell
- John Blackwell
- Brian Blade
- Allen Blairman
- Art Blakey
- John G. Blowers, Jr.
- Mickey Bones
- Fred Braceful
- Pauline Braddy
- Tiny Bradshaw
- Brittany Brooks
- Cecil Brooks III
- Roy Brooks
- Anthony Brown
- Mel Brown
- Larry Bunker
- Gary Burghoff
- Ronnie Burrage
- Alvin Burroughs
- Frank Butler

=== C ===
- Gene Calderazzo
- Charlie Callas
- Frank Capp
- Terri Lyne Carrington
- Michael Carvin
- Sid Catlett
- Nick Ceroli
- Jimmy Chamberlin
- Dennis Chambers
- Joe Chambers
- Leon "Ndugu" Chancler
- Gary Chester
- Mike Clark
- Kenny Clarke
- Gerald Cleaver
- Alex Cline
- Jimmy Cobb
- Billy Cobham
- Cozy Cole
- Denardo Coleman
- Rudy Collins
- Norman Connors
- Frank Cook
- Jerome Cooper
- Keith Copeland
- Jack Costanzo
- Irving Cottler
- Louis Cottrell, Sr.
- Herbert Cowans
- Jimmy Crawford
- Adam Cruz
- Andrew Cyrille

=== D ===
- Billie Davies
- Quincy Davis
- Steve Davis
- Alan Dawson
- Ike Day
- Donald Dean
- Barrett Deems
- Jack DeJohnette
- Kenny Dennis
- Joe DeRenzo
- Clem DeRosa
- Michael Di Pasqua
- Whit Dickey
- Bruce Ditmas
- Ben Dixon
- Baby Dodds
- Bobby Donaldson
- Eddie Dougherty
- Bill Douglass
- Bill Dowdy
- Josh Dun
- Hamid Drake
- Al Dreares
- Buzzy Drootin
- Billy Drummond
- Frankie Dunlop
- Bobby Durham

=== E ===
- Arthur Edgehill
- Marc Edwards
- Bill Elgart
- Atilla Engin
- Herman "Roscoe" Ernest III
- Peter Erskine
- Pete Escovedo
- Sticks Evans
- Sue Evans

=== F ===
- Joe Farnsworth
- Nick Fatool
- Morey Feld
- Sherman Ferguson
- Alvin Fielder
- Kansas Fields
- Sammy Figueroa
- Chuck Flores
- Al Foster
- Panama Francis
- Cie Frazier
- Bruz Freeman
- Bob French

=== G ===
- Steve Gadd
- Frank Gagliardi
- Rich Galichon
- Joe Gallivan
- Gene Gammage
- Frank Gant
- Alvester Garnett
- Eddie Gladden
- Bill Goodwin
- Danny Gottlieb
- Eric Gravatt
- Milford Graves
- Sonny Greer
- Freddie Gruber
- Terreon Gully

=== H ===
- Omar Hakim
- Dana Hall
- Minor Hall
- Tubby Hall
- Chico Hamilton
- Jeff Hamilton
- Ivan Hampden, Jr.
- Lionel Hampton
- Jake Hanna
- Al Harewood
- Eric Harland
- Winard Harper
- Beaver Harris
- Billy Hart
- Roy Harte
- Louis Hayes
- Roy Haynes
- Monk Hazel
- Fats Heard
- J. C. Heard
- Albert Heath
- Mike Heller
- Gerry Hemingway
- Arthur Herbert
- Phil Hey
- Billy Higgins
- Andrew Hilaire
- Jeff Hirshfield
- Ari Hoenig
- G.T. Hogan
- Milt Holland
- John Hollenbeck
- Bob Holz
- William Hooker
- Stix Hooper
- Jimmy Hopps
- Frank Hudec
- Paul Humphrey
- Lex Humphries
- Roger Humphries

=== I ===
- Susie Ibarra
- Sonny Igoe
- Frank Isola

=== J ===
- Ali Jackson
- Oliver Jackson
- Ronald Shannon Jackson
- Pete Jacobs (musician)
- Sunny Jain
- Clifford Jarvis
- Morris Jennings
- Dink Johnson
- Gus Johnson
- Manzie Johnson
- Osie Johnson
- Smokey Johnson
- Alan Jones
- Elvin Jones
- Jo Jones
- Philly Joe Jones
- Rufus "Speedy" Jones
- Rusty Jones
- Slick Jones
- Willie Jones, III
- Steve Jordan
- Robert Jospé

=== K ===
- Tiny Kahn
- Connie Kay
- Sean J. Kennedy
- Billy Kilson
- Irv Kluger
- Freddie Kohlman
- Gene Krupa
- Andy Kubiszewski

=== L ===
- Joe LaBarbera
- Papa Jack Laine
- Don Lamond
- Vince Lateano
- Ricky Lawson
- Bob Leatherbarrow
- Mark Ledford
- Cliff Leeman
- Stan Levey
- Al Levitt
- Mel Lewis
- Victor Lewis
- Eddie Locke
- Cecil Brooks III
- Herbie Lovelle

=== M ===
- Dennis Mackrel
- Peter Magadini
- Future Man
- Shelly Manne
- Ray Mantilla
- Larance Marable
- Art Mardigan
- Sherrie Maricle
- Jason Marsalis
- George Marsh
- Eddie Marshall
- Joe Marshall
- Kaiser Marshall
- Billy Martin
- Stu Martin
- Harvey Mason
- Steve McCall
- Roy McCurdy
- Monk McFay
- Ray McKinley
- Bill McKinney
- Butch Miles
- J. R. Mitchell
- Louis Mitchell
- Charles Moffett
- John Molo
- T. S. Monk
- Stanton Moore
- Chauncey Morehouse
- Joe Morello
- Curtis Mosby
- Bob Moses
- J. C. Moses
- Paul Motian
- Alphonse Mouzon
- Don Moye
- Idris Muhammad
- Don Mumford
- Paul Murphy
- Sunny Murray
- Kris Myers

=== N ===
- Lewis Nash
- Jack Noren
- Kevin Norton
- Adam Nussbaum

=== O ===
- Grassella Oliphant
- Ulysses Owens

=== P ===
- Leon Parker
- Sonny Parker
- Sonny Payne
- William Peeples
- Paul Peress
- Walter Perkins
- Ben Perowsky
- Charlie Persip
- Ralph Peterson, Jr.
- Benny Peyton
- Dan Pinto
- Ben Pollack
- Jeff Porcaro
- Joe Porcaro
- Roy Porter
- Yank Porter
- Specs Powell
- Ollie Powers
- Bobby Previte
- Jesse Price
- Dafnis Prieto
- Tito Puente
- Bernard Purdie
- Keg Purnell
- Maurice Purtill
- Moe Purtill

=== Q ===
- Alvin Queen

=== R ===
- Johnny Rae
- Tom Rainey
- Paul Ramsey
- Sam Ranelli
- Chuck Redd
- Tony Reedus
- William Frank Reichenbach Sr.
- Damion Reid
- Steve Reid
- Steve Reid (The Rippingtons)
- Charlie Rice
- Buddy Rich
- Emil Richards
- Dannie Richmond
- Karriem Riggins
- Ben Riley
- Herlin Riley
- John Bernard Riley
- Max Roach
- Gino Robair
- John Robinson
- David Rokeach
- Mickey Roker
- Jay Rosen
- Bobby Rosengarden
- Tony Royster, Jr.
- Robert M. Rucker
- Hal Russell
- Dylan Ryan

=== S ===
- Gar Samuelson
- Bobby Sanabria
- Juma Santos
- Red Saunders
- Tony Sbarbaro
- George Schuller
- Allan Schwartzberg
- Lafrae Olivia Sci
- Aaron Scott
- Kendrick Scott
- Lloyd Scott
- Danny Seraphine
- Frank Severino
- Ed Shaughnessy
- Dinerral Shavers
- Charles "Bobo" Shaw
- Kevin Shea
- Shep Shepherd
- Mark Sherman
- George T. Simon
- Pete La Roca
- Zutty Singleton
- Matt Slocum
- Ches Smith
- Jimmie Smith
- Marvin Smith
- Michael S. Smith
- Steve Smith
- Warren Smith
- Ed Soph
- Jack Sperling
- Nick Stabulas
- Tom Stacks
- George Stafford
- Johnny Stein
- Bill Stewart
- Isaiah Stewart
- Alvin Stoller

=== T ===
- Grady Tate
- Art Taylor
- Jasper Taylor
- Brannen Temple
- Ben Thigpen
- Ed Thigpen
- Bobby Thomas
- Chester Thompson
- Chuck Thompson
- Kimberly Thompson
- Cal Tjader
- Dave Tough
- Arthur Trappier
- Milt Turner
- Chris Tyle

=== U ===
- Sam Ulano

=== V ===
- Tony Vacca
- Vinson Valega
- Tommy Vig
- Bill Vitt
- John Von Ohlen

=== W ===
- Chad Wackerman
- Luigi Waites
- Freddie Waits
- Kenny Washington
- Leo Watson
- Jeff "Tain" Watts
- Chick Webb
- Speed Webb
- Spider Webb
- Dave Weckl
- Paul Wertico
- Doc West
- George Wettling
- Chip White
- Lenny White
- Al "Cake" Wichard
- Buddy Williams
- Jeff Williams
- Johnny Williams
- Leroy Williams
- Steve Williams
- Tony Williams
- Phillip Wilson
- Shadow Wilson
- Kenny Wollesen
- Sam Woodyard
- Specs Wright

=== Y ===
- Lee Young

=== Z ===
- Kahil El'Zabar
- Eliot Zigmund

== See also ==
- List of jazz bassists
- List of jazz clarinetists
- List of jazz drummers
- List of jazz guitarists
- List of jazz organists
- List of jazz percussionists
- List of jazz pianists
- List of jazz saxophonists
- List of jazz trombonists
- List of jazz trumpeters
- List of jazz violinists
- List of jazz vocalists
