= List of jazz drummers =

Jazz drummers play percussion (predominantly the drum set) in jazz, jazz fusion, and other jazz subgenres such as latin jazz. The techniques and instrumentation of this type of performance have evolved over the 1900s, influenced by jazz at large and the individual drummers within it. Jazz required a method of playing percussion different from traditional European styles, one that was easily adaptable to the different rhythms of the new genre, fostering the creation of jazz drumming's hybrid technique. As each period in the evolution of jazz—swing and bebop, for example—tended to have its own rhythmic style, jazz drumming continued to evolve along with the music. In the 1970s and 1980s, jazz drumming incorporated elements of rock and Latin styles.

Notable jazz drummers include:

== A ==
- Espen Aalberg (born 1975)
- Knut Aalefjær (born 1974)
- Brian Abrahams (born 1947)
- Clarence Acox Jr. (born 1952)
- Airto Moreira (born 1941)
- Alex Acuña (born 1944)
- Annette A. Aguilar (born 1957)
- Mousey Alexander (1922–1988)
- Rashied Ali (1933–2009)
- Don Alias (1939–2006)
- Carl Allen (born 1961)
- Barry Altschul (born 1943)
- Cliff Almond
- Leon Anderson
- Charly Antolini (born 1937)
- Steve Argüelles (born 1963)
- John Armatage (born 1929)
- Joe Ascione (1961–2016)

== B ==
- Jon Audun Baar (born 1986)
- Colin Bailey (1934–2021)
- Dave Bailey (1926–2023)
- Donald Bailey (1933–2013)
- Ginger Baker (1939–2019)
- Newman Taylor Baker (born 1943)
- Butch Ballard (1918–2011)
- Jeff Ballard (born 1963)
- Tom Bancroft (born 1967)
- Paul Barbarin (1899–1969)
- Danny Barcelona (1929–2007)
- Joey Baron (born 1955)
- Ray Barretto (1929–2006)
- Ray Bauduc (1906–1988)
- Louie Bellson (1924–2009)
- Warren Benbow (born 1954)
- Gregg Bendian (born 1963)
- Tommy Benford (1905–1994)
- Han Bennink (born 1942)
- Black Benny (c. 1890–1924)
- Chief Bey (1913–2004)
- Big Bill Bissonnette (1937–2018)
- Gregg Bissonette (born 1959)
- Snorre Bjerck (born 1962)
- Ivar Loe Bjørnstad (born 1981)
- James N. Black (1940–1988)
- Jim Black (born 1967)
- Cindy Blackman (born 1959)
- Ed Blackwell (1929–1992)
- Brian Blade (born 1970)
- Johnathan Blake (born 1976)
- Art Blakey (1919–1990)
- Johnny Blowers (1911–2006)
- Tiny Bradshaw (1907–1958)
- Stein Inge Brækhus (born 1967)
- Øyvind Brandtsegg (born 1971)
- Roy Brooks (1938-2005)
- Anthony Brown (born 1953)
- Guillermo E. Brown (born 1976)
- Bill Bruford (born 1949)
- Ronald Bruner Jr. (born 1982)
- Larry Bunker (1928–2005)
- Dominik Burkhalter (born 1975)
- Ronnie Burrage (born 1959)
- Frank Butler (1928–1984)
- Oleg Butman (born 1966)

== C ==
- Will Calhoun (born 1964)
- Cándido Camero (1921–2020)
- Terri Lyne Carrington (born 1965)
- Michael Carvin (born 1944)
- Sid Catlett (1910–1951)
- Louis Cato (born 1985)
- Nick Ceroli (1939–1985)
- Dennis Chambers (born 1959)
- Joe Chambers (born 1942)
- Leon "Ndugu" Chancler (1952–2018)
- Jim Chapin (1919–2009)
- Denis Charles (1933–1998)
- Jon Christensen (1943-2020)
- Svein Christiansen (1941-2015)
- Kenny Clare (1929–1985)
- Mike Clark (born 1946)
- Kenny Clarke (1914–1985)
- Gerald Cleaver (born 1963)
- Jimmy Cobb (1929–2020)
- Billy Cobham (born 1944)
- Vinnie Colaiuta (born 1956)
- Cozy Cole (1909–1981)
- Louis Cole (born 1986)
- Rudy Collins (1934–1988)
- Norman Connors (born 1947)
- Clark Coolidge (born 1939)
- Pierre Courbois (born 1940)
- Tony Crombie (1925–1999)
- Stanley Crouch (1945–2020)
- Adam Cruz (born 1970)
- Andrew Cyrille (born 1939)

== D ==
- Erland Dahlen (born 1971)
- Børre Dalhaug (born 1974)
- Chris Dave (born 1973)
- Billie Davies (born 1955)
- Quincy Davis (born 1977)
- Alan Dawson (1929–1996)
- Barrett Deems (1914–1998)
- Adam Deitch (born 1976)
- Jack DeJohnette (1942–2025)
- Eric Delaney (1924–2011)
- John Densmore (born 1944)
- Buddy Deppenschmidt (1936–2021)
- Joe DeRenzo (born 1958)
- Xavier Desandre Navarre (born 1961)
- Corrie Dick (born 1990)
- Whit Dickey (born 1954)
- Baby Dodds (1898–1959)
- Bill Dowdy (1932–2017)
- Hamid Drake (born 1955)
- Martin Drew (1944–2010)
- Buzzy Drootin (1920–2000)
- Billy Drummond (born 1959)

== E ==
- Marc Edwards (born 1949)
- Kenneth Ekornes (born 1974)
- Torstein Ellingsen (born 1966)
- Peter Erskine (born 1954)

== F ==
- Jon Fält (born 1979)
- Joe Farnsworth (born 1968)
- Billy Ficca (born 1950)
- Chuck Flores (1935–2016)
- Al Foster (1943–2025)
- Vernel Fournier (1928–2000)
- Panama Francis (1918–2001)
- Future Man (born 1957)
- Alvin Fielder (1935–2019)
- Shinya Fukumori (born 1984)

== G ==
- Steve Gadd (born 1945)
- Rich Galichon (born 1968)
- Stéphane Galland (born 1969)
- Alvester Garnett (born 1970)
- Håkon Gebhardt (born 1969)
- Peter Giger (1939–2026)
- Marcus Gilmore (born 1986)
- Jan Martin Gismervik (born 1988)
- Sverre Gjørvad (born 1966)
- Danny Gottlieb (born 1953)
- Bobby Graham (1940–2009)
- Milford Graves (1941–2021)
- Eric Gravatt (born 1947)
- Freddie Gruber (1927–2011)
- Benny Greb (born 1980)
- Mark Guiliana (born 1980)
- Terreon Gully (born 1972)

== H ==
- Omar Hakim (born 1959)
- Dana Hall (born 1969)
- Tubby Hall (1895–1945)
- Chico Hamilton (1921–2013)
- Jeff Hamilton (born 1953)
- Ole Hamre (born 1959)
- Ole Jacob Hansen (1940–2000)
- Trond Sverre Hansen (born 1964)
- Jake Hanna (1931–2010)
- Al Harewood (1923–2014)
- Eric Harland (born 1976)
- Beaver Harris (1936–1991)
- Gavin Harrison (born 1963)
- Billy Hart (born 1940)
- Jakop Janssønn Hauan (born 1986)
- Tor Haugerud (born 1962)
- Pål Hausken (born 1980)
- Manfred Hausleitner (born 1957)
- Louis Hayes (born 1937)
- Roy Haynes (1925–2024)
- J. C. Heard (1917–1988)
- Albert "Tootie" Heath (1935–2024)
- Gerry Hemingway (born 1955)
- Horacio "El Negro" Hernandez (born 1963)
- Billy Higgins (1936–2001)
- Per Hillestad (born 1959)
- Ari Hoenig (born 1973)
- Wetle Holte (born 1973)
- Bob Holz (born 1958)
- William Hooker (born 1946)
- Stix Hooper (born 1938)
- Martin Horntveth (born 1977)
- Hans Hulbækmo (born 1989)
- Daniel Humair (born 1938)
- Roger Humphries (born 1944)
- Gary Husband (born 1960)
- Gregory Hutchinson (born 1970)

== I ==
- Susie Ibarra (born 1970)
- Eric Ineke (born 1947)
- Terje Isungset (born 1964)

== J ==
- Ali Jackson (born 1976)
- Duffy Jackson (1953–2021)
- Ronald Shannon Jackson (1940–2013)
- Frank Jakobsen (born 1954)
- Marcin Jahr (born 1969)
- Clifford Jarvis (1941–1999)
- Bjørn Jenssen (born 1959)
- Egil Johansen (1934–1998)
- Håkon Mjåset Johansen (born 1975)
- Per Oddvar Johansen (born 1968)
- Roger Johansen (born 1972)
- Dink Johnson (1892–1954)
- Gus Johnson (1913–2000)
- Osie Johnson (1923–1966)
- Elvin Jones (1927–2004)
- Jo Jones (1911–1985)
- Philly Joe Jones (1923–1985)
- Rusty Jones (1942–2015)
- Willie Jones (1929–1991)
- Robert Jospé (born 1950)

== K ==
- Kenneth Kapstad (born 1979)
- Tiny Kahn (1923–1953)
- Chris Karan (born 1939)
- Manu Katché (born 1958)
- Connie Kay (1927–1994)
- Franklin Kiermyer (born 1956)
- Johnny Klein (1918–1997)
- Lala Kovačev (1939–2012)
- Gene Krupa (1909–1973)
- David King (born 1970)
- Audun Kleive (born 1961)
- Andreas Lønmo Knudsrød (born 1982)
- Ivar Kolve (born 1967)
- Gyula Kovács (1929–1992)

== L ==
- Joe LaBarbera (born 1948)
- Thomas Lang (born 1967)
- Pete La Roca (1938–2012)
- Papa Jack Laine (1873–1966)
- Don Lamond (1920–2003)
- Bill LaVorgna (1933–2007)
- Ricky Lawson (1954–2013)
- Stan Levey (1926–2005)
- Torstein Lofthus (born 1977)
- Mel Lewis (1929–1990)
- Victor Lewis (born 1950)
- Henrik Lødøen (born 1991)
- Olavi Louhivuori (born 1981)

== M ==
- Peter Magadini (1942–2023)
- Jojo Mayer (born 1963)
- Makaya McCraven (born 1983)
- Ray McKinley (1910–1995)
- Bill McKinney (1895–1969)
- Shelly Manne (1920–1984)
- Larance Marable (1929–2012)
- Jason Marsalis (born 1977)
- Barrett Martin (born 1967)
- Billy Martin (born 1963)
- Harvey Mason (born 1947)
- Marilyn Mazur (born 1955)
- Butch Miles (1944–2023)
- Mike Mitchell (born c. 1995)
- Mitch Mitchell (1946–2008)
- Charles Moffett (1929–1997)
- Ole Mofjell (born 1990)
- Louis Moholo (1940–2025)
- T. S. Monk (born 1949)
- Mark Mondesir (born 1964)
- Freddie Moore (1900–1992)
- Airto Moreira (born 1941)
- Joe Morello (1928–2011)
- Ikue Mori (born 1953)
- Bob Moses (born 1948)
- Paul Motian (1931–2011)
- Alphonse Mouzon (1948–2016)
- Famoudou Don Moye (born 1946)
- Idris Muhammad (1939–2014)
- Günter Müller (born 1954)
- Don Mumford (1954–2007)
- Sunny Murray (1936–2017)

== N ==
- Lewis Nash (born 1958)
- Adam Nussbaum (born 1955)
- Gard Nilssen (born 1983)
- Paal Nilssen-Love (born 1974)
- Helge Andreas Norbakken (born 1965)
- Hermund Nygård (born 1979)
- Erik Nylander (born 1981)

== O ==
- Ferit Odman (born 1982)
- Kim Ofstad (born 1969)
- Tom Olstad (born 1953)
- Tiger Onitsuka (born 1998)
- Kåre Opheim (born 1975)
- Bobby Orr (1928–2020)
- Magnus Öström (born 1965)
- Kassa Overall (born 1982)
- Ulysses Owens (born 1982)
- Tony Oxley (1938–2023)
- Svein Øvergaard (1912–1986)

== P ==
- Earl Palmer (1924–2008)
- Leon Parker (born 1965)
- Deantoni Parks (born 1977)
- Sonny Payne (1926–1979)
- Leo Pearlstein (1920–2025)
- Clarence Penn (born 1968)
- Paul Peress
- Charlie Persip (1929–2020)
- Ralph Peterson Jr. (born 1962)
- Simon Phillips (born 1957)
- Ben Pollack (1903–1971)
- Joe Porcaro (1930–2020)
- Richie Pratt (1943–2015)
- Bobby Previte (born 1951)
- Thomas Pridgen (born 1983)
- Bernard Purdie (born 1939)

== R ==
- Abbey Rader (1943–2025)
- Damion Reid (born 1979)
- Buddy Rich (1917–1987)
- Dannie Richmond (1931–1988)
- Alex Riel (1940–2024)
- Karriem Riggins (born 1975)
- Ben Riley (1933–2017)
- Herlin Riley (born 1957)
- John Riley (born 1954)
- Max Roach (1924–2007)
- David Rokeach
- Jay Rosen (born 1961)
- Jamison Ross (born 1987)
- Hal Russell (1926–1992)

== S ==
- Bobby Sanabria (born 1957)
- Antonio Sánchez (born 1971)
- Ernst-Wiggo Sandbakk (born 1957)
- Red Saunders (1912–1981)
- Aaron Scott (born 1956)
- Kendrick Scott (born 1980)
- Phil Seamen (1926–1972)
- Robert Searight (born 1975)
- Jerry Segal (1931–1974)
- Ed Shaughnessy (1929–2013)
- Michael Shrieve (born 1949)
- Zutty Singleton (1898–1975)
- Marvin "Smitty" Smith (born 1961)
- Michael S. Smith (1946–2006)
- Nate Smith (born 1974)
- Steve Smith (born 1954)
- Viola Smith (1912–2020)
- Ed Soph (born 1945)
- Tyshawn Sorey (born 1980)
- Ronnie Stephenson (1937–2002)
- John Stevens (1940–1994)
- Bill Stewart (born 1966)
- Alvin Stoller (1925–1992)
- Isak Strand (born 1982)
- Thomas Strønen (born 1972)
- Norbert Susemihl (born 1956)

== T ==
- Tani Tabbal
- Grady Tate (1932–2017)
- Art Taylor (1929–1995)
- Ed Thigpen (1930–2010)
- Chester Thompson (born 1948)
- Cal Tjader (1925–1982)
- Dave Tough (1907–1948)
- Trevor Tomkins (1941–2022)

== V ==
- Vinson Valega (born 1965)
- Ronnie Verrell (1926–2002)
- Edward Vesala (1945–1999)
- Tommy Vig (born 1938)

== W ==
- Chad Wackerman (born 1960)
- Narada Michael Walden (born 1952)
- Fredrik Wallumrød (born 1973)
- Kenny Washington (born 1958)
- Jeff "Tain" Watts (born 1960)
- Chick Webb (1905–1939)
- Dave Weckl (born 1960)
- Dan Weiss (born 1977)
- Paul Wertico (born 1953)
- Lenny White (born 1949)
- Maurice White (1941–2016)
- Steve White (born 1965)
- Andreas Wildhagen (born 1988)
- Jeff Williams (born 1950)
- Johnny Williams (1905–1984)
- Tony Williams (1945–1997)
- Greg Williamson (born 1965)
- Nate Wood (born 1979)

== Z ==
- Ingar Zach (born 1971)
- Ronnie Zito (born 1939)

== See also ==
- List of American jazz drummers
