= Andre Thomas (disambiguation) =

Andre Thomas is a convicted murderer and death row inmate in Texas.

Andre Thomas may also refer to:

- André J. Thomas (born 1952), American composer, conductor, and academic
- André Thomas (cinematographer) (1911–1955), French cinematographer
