= Janice Harsanyi =

American opera singer (1929–2007)

Janice Harsanyi (née Morris; July 15, 1929 – March 22, 2007) was an American soprano singer and college professor.

== Early life and education ==
Janice was born in Arlington, Massachusetts, the daughter of a Presbyterian minister and lived in the Hamilton Square section of Hamilton Township, Mercer County, New Jersey at an early age. She graduated from Westminster Choir College where she was a student of LoRean Hodapp and John Finley Williamson. She pursued graduate studies at the Academy of Vocal Arts in Philadelphia where she was a voice student of Sidney Dietch.

== Career ==
Harsanyi married Nicholas Harsanyi, a violist who went to school with Béla Bartók in Hungary. Nikki founded the Tallahassee Symphony Orchestra in 1979, his wife, Janice, was known as "first lady" of the TSO. Nicholas Harsanyi died in 1987.

In 1958, Harsanyi sang as soloist during the opening ceremonies for the United Nations. In 1959 she made her Carnegie Hall debut singing Berlioz's La Damnation de Faust with the Philadelphia Orchestra.

In 1960, Harsanyi sang on Eugene Ormandy and Philadelphia Orchestra's recording of Carl Orff's Carmina Burana with singer/actor Harve Presnell. This was released by Columbia/Sony on LP and CD.

In 1964, Harsanyi sang Beethoven at a peace rally in Philadelphia that featured Martin Luther King Jr. Harsanyi also sang for Albert Einstein during a dinner party in Princeton, New Jersey and husband Nikki played chamber music with Einstein. While at Princeton she became the head of the voice department at Westminster Choir College in the early 1950s.

On February 17, 1969, Janice Harsanyi, along with Helen Boatwright, Jenneke Barton and John Ferrante, performed George Frideric Handel's opera Amadigi with the Princeton Chamber Orchestra under the direction of J. Merrill Knapp.

She has performed the works of notable composers such as Roger Sessions and John Harbison. She recorded one solo recital LP disc (released circa 1960 on the small Period Records label, SPL 581) titled "Great New Voices of Today, Vol. 1" consisting of French and German songs, with Otto Herz at the piano.

Harsanyi joined the voice faculty of Florida State University's College of Music in 1978. While there, Harsanyi became involved with the Tallahassee Symphony Orchestra and was a voice coach with the Capitol City Opera Company. She died in Tallahassee, Florida.

== Recordings ==
- Orff: Carmina Burana. Carl Orff (1895 - 1982) Performers: Janice Harsanyi (Soprano), Rudolf Petrak (Tenor), Harve Presnell (Baritone). Rutgers University Chorus.
- Orff: Carmina Burana. Carl Orff. Performers: Janice Harsanyi (Soprano), Rudolf Petrak (Tenor), Harve Presnell (Baritone). Rutgers University Chorus.
