= Leon Anderson =

Leon Anderson may refer to:

- Leon Anderson (musician), American jazz drummer
- Leon Anderson (sociologist), American sociologist

== See also ==
- Leonard Anderson, American film editor and film director
