= Cordle =

Cordle is a surname. Notable people with the surname include:

- David Cordle (born 1954), American academic
- Gerald Cordle (born 1960), Welsh rugby union and rugby league player
- Jim Cordle (born 1987), American football player
- John Cordle (1912–2004), British politician
- Larry Cordle (born 1948), American singer-songwriter
- Tony Cordle (born 1940), Barbadian cricketer
