= Florida State University College of Music =

Public college in Tallahassee, Florida, US

College of Music
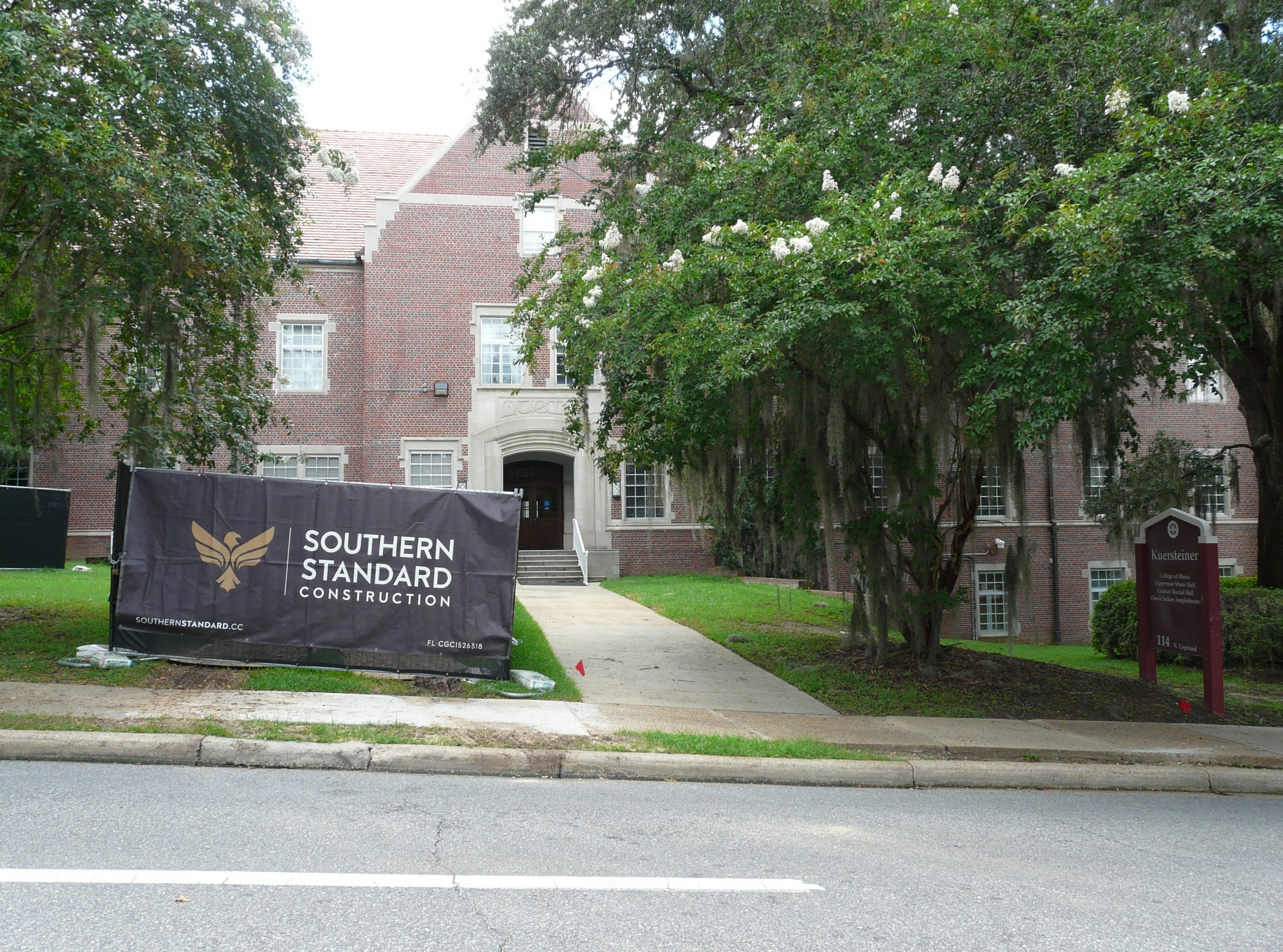
- Type: Public
- Established: 1901
- Dean: Todd Queen
- Students: 1,082
- Location: Tallahassee, Florida, U.S. 30°26′34.6″N 84°17′29.3″W
- Website: www.music.fsu.edu

The Florida State University College of Music, located in Tallahassee, Florida, is one of sixteen colleges comprising Florida State University. The college houses two Grammy winners, a former concertmaster of the New York Philharmonic, a Pulitzer Prize-winning composer, a former leading tenor of the Metropolitan Opera, and the world's leading scholar in music therapy. As the third-largest music program in higher education, the college's comprehensive curricula embrace all traditional areas of music and world music study from the baccalaureate to the doctoral level.

== Notable people ==
=== Alumni ===
- David Cordle, current Provost and Vice President for Academic Affairs at Emporia State University.

=== Faculty ===
- Leon Anderson
- Scotty Barnhart
- Yvonne Ciannella
- Ernst von Dohnányi
- Carlisle Floyd
- Janice Harsanyi
- Edward Kilenyi
- Ladislav Kubík
- Stanford Olsen
- Marcus Roberts
- Pietro Spada
- André J. Thomas
- Ellen Taaffe Zwilich
