= The Musician's Guide to Polyrhythms =

Study guide book by Peter Magadini

Polyrhythms: The Musician's Guide
- Author: Peter Magadini
- Original title: The Musician's Guide to Polyrhythms Vol. I & II
- Language: English
- Subject: A Study of Polyrhythms for Musicians
- Genre: Music Textbook
- Publisher: Try Publishing, Hal Leonard Publishing Corporation
- Publication date: 1993 / 2001
- Media type: Print, paperback and digital
- Pages: 66 pp
- ISBN: 978-0634032837

The Musician's Guide to Polyrhythms is a study guide by American author, drummer and percussionist Peter Magadini. Musician's Guide to Polyrhythms Vol. I was written in 1967 and published in 1968. Musician's Guide to Polyrhythms Vol. II was written in 1970 and published in 1971 and was (at the time) a continuation of Vol. l. The first publisher (Try Publishing, Hollywood, Ca.) published both volumes separately. These volumes have since been combined into one single volume called Polyrhythms: The Musicians Guide and is now published by Hal Leonard Publishing Corporation.

Both books were written after Peter had studied with North Indian Tabla Drum Master, Mahapurush Misra, who was teaching and playing with Usted Ali Akbar Khan in a summer program of North Indian Classical Music at the University of California, Berkeley campus in 1966. Realizing the need for a pedagogical system of study for musicians using the “western” system of notation; Magadini re-configured the concepts and coined the phrase “time ratios”, which describes the mathematical ratios of polymeters as they relate to each other. Magadini also introduced in these volumes a new way to write “Polyrhythmic Time Signatures”. Both volumes deal with polymeters and polyrhythms, and are presented, in a step-by-step manner, through exercises and etudes that progress from easy to difficult.

== Critical reception ==
Gunther Schuller of the New England Conservatory called Musicians Guide to Polyrhythms "... a very important contribution".

In 1993, Modern Drummer Magazine ranked Polyrhythms The Musician's Guide as #6 in its survey of "the 25 Greatest Drum books".

A review in the Percussion Arts Society's Percussion Notes lauded the book's organization and the "articulate and easily understood" explanations of the various polyrhythms.

== Polyrhythms For The Drumset ==
Another polyrhythm book by Magadini was written exclusively for drumset drummers titled Polyrhythms For The Drumset (originally published in 1973) . It is currently published by Alfred Publishing. It also presents polyrhythms and polymeters in step-by-step exercises and etudes. However, the polyrhythms are distributed between hands and feet at the drumset in independent combinations between the ride cymbal, the snare drum, the bass drum and hi hat. This book also describes and contains exercises that teach drummers how to play and perform metric modulation. Polyrhythms For The Drumset endorsers include: Vic Firth, Steve Smith, Cindy Blackman, Peter Erskin, Roy Burns, Jim Chapin, Chad Wackerman, Anthony Cirone, Louie Bellson, William F. Miller (Modern Drummer Magazine)
