= André J. Thomas =

American composer and conductor (born 1952)

André Jerome Thomas (born 15 August 1952) is an American composer and conductor. He served as a professor of music at the College of Music at Florida State University and the artistic director for the Tallahassee Community Chorus. In addition to his conducting and composition credits, Thomas is a published author, having written Way Over in Beulah Lan': Understanding and Performing the Negro Spiritual, and numerous journal articles.

== Early life ==
Thomas grew up in Wichita, Kansas with his two sisters and mother. Thomas's mother cleaned buses for Continental Trailways and sang in church. According to Thomas, this singing initiated his fascination with music.

Thomas explored choral music and instrumental music. During his elementary school years, he sporadically took piano lessons from various members of his church. This musical training notwithstanding, Thomas was predominantly self-taught during his early childhood.

Upon entering junior high school, Thomas decided to pursue piano formally. He began taking lessons at Wichita State University, and by eighth grade, he won the Federated Music Clubs Piano Competition. During this time, Thomas participated in his junior high school’s choir and began disliking spiritual and gospel music which he has since become known for composing. He has since said that

I must admit, I was not fond of these settings, even through high school. As a young black man, I really didn’t identify. This was not the black music that I knew, and it certainly wasn’t the music that I experienced at my church! The text utilized dialect and it made me feel as if performing this music gave white people a chance to make fun of black people. I never really heard the message in the text; I only heard the way it sounded. We certainly weren’t allowed to speak like that in my home and it denoted ignorance in my mind...

While the discomfort may have continued throughout high school, it did not stop him from being actively involved in music and composition. At 16, Thomas accepted the role of Minister of Music at Tabernacle Baptist Church. He began arranging music to meet the needs of his choir. However, his time as a music minister was not easy. Many of the choir members balked at taking instructions from such a young person. This created enough tension for him to eventually leave the choir.

== College and early profession ==
Thomas earned degrees from Friends University (B.M. 1973), Northwestern University (M.M. in Piano Performance 1976), and University of Illinois (D.M.A. 1983). During his time at Friends University, Thomas sang under the direction of Jester Hairston. Hairston noticed Thomas's lack of enthusiasm for spiritual and gospel music and pulled Thomas aside to discuss this with him. Hairston explained how "[the] dialect was not a sign of inferiority but an accommodation for sounds that were not part of African speech".

After finishing his bachelor's degree at Friends University in Wichita, KS, Thomas began teaching at Brooks Junior High School in the Wichita Public School System. Additionally, he served as the Youth Music Minister at Canaan Baptist Church. Two years later, Thomas left to pursue his master's degree in Chicago. While studying at Northwestern University, Thomas decided against a career as a concert pianist. Instead, he aspired to spend his time conducting and teaching because he did not enjoy the solitary nature of becoming a concert pianist. Following his degree at Northwestern, Thomas returned to Wichita Public School System to teach at Coleman Junior High School before deciding to pursue his doctoral degree at the University of Illinois. While there, Thomas received an opportunity to assist Harold Decker, the then Director of Choral Activities, and to direct the University Chorus, as well as the University of Illinois Black Chorus.

== Professional career ==
Thomas began his professional career at the University of Texas in Austin (1981-1984) while finishing his doctoral degree. He then began his long career at Florida State University. He served as Director of Choral Activities, Professor of Choral Education, as well as Owen F. Sellers Professor of Music at Florida State University, retiring in 2019.

In addition to his collegiate teaching career, Thomas conducts various choral organizations throughout the United States and internationally. He founded and directed the Tallahassee Community Chorus from 1998 to 2019. Internationally, he has conducted in Australia, England, China, Estonia, Israel, New Zealand and many other countries. Thomas has conducted 49 All-State high school choirs, and has twice conducted the World Youth Choir.

Thomas' influence ranges beyond conducting, as he is the author of various choral education editions. An active composer, he has been published by seven publishing companies. His writing frequently addresses the struggle of becoming a black “classical” composer, as well as the challenge of performing ethnic music (spirituals and gospels) with integrity.

André Jerome Thomas is published by a number of publishers including Hinshaw Music and Gentry Publications; and Choristers Guild https://www.choristersguild.org/store/cga718-i-will-sing-praises/3872/

== Selected works ==
=== Non-compositional works ===
- “What They See is What You Get”- instructional video on choral conducting with Rodney Eichenberger
- “Body, Mind, Spirit, Voice”- instructional video on adolescent voices with Anton Armstrong
- Way Over in Beulah Lan’: Understanding and Performing the Negro Spiritual. Dayton, OH: Heritage Music Press, 2007.

=== Choral compositions ===
- Keep Your Lamps! (TB/TTB/TTBB), Hinshaw Music, 2017
- Glory to God (SATB), Heritage Music Press, 2015
- Until I Found the Lord (SSA), Heritage Music Press, 15/2674h, 2009
- Until I Found the Lord (SATB), Heritage Music Press, 15/2673h, 2009
- Walk in My Shoes (SATB), Hinshaw Music, HMC2241, 2009
- My Good Lord's Done Been Here (SATB), Heritage Music Press, 15/2480H, 2009
- Go Down’n the Valley and Pray (SATB), Heritage Music Press, 15/2348H, 2007
- Beautiful City (SATB), Heritage Music Press, 15/2124H 2006
- Walk in the Light (SATB) Choristers Guild, CGA 1063 2006
- Walk in the Light (2pt) Choristers Guild, CGA 1062 2006
- Keep Your Lamps (SATB), Hinshaw Music, 2005
- Keep Your Lamps! (SA/SSA/SSAA), Hinshaw Music, 2005
- I’m Gonna Sing (SATB), Heritage Music Press, 15/2023h, 2005
- I’m Gonna Sing (SSA), Heritage Music Press, 15/2023h, 2005
- Barbara Allen (SSA), Heritage Music Press, 15/1986h 2005
- Barbara Allen (TBB), Heritage Music Press, pending 2005
- Good News (SSA), Heritage Music Press, 15/1886h, 2004
- Good News (TTB), Heritage Music Press, 15/1890h, 2004
- Fences (SATB), Heritage Music Press, 15/1797h 2003
- Swing Down Chariot (SATB), Heritage Music Press, 15/1798h 2003
- Deep River (SATB), Heritage Music Press, 15/1750h 2002
- I Dream A World (SAB 3-Part mixed), Heritage Music Press, 15/1730h, 2002
- John Saw Duh Number (SSAA), Heritage Music Press, 15/1666h 2001
- John Saw Duh Number (SATB), Heritage Music Press, 15/1665h 2001
- I Hear America Singing (2 Part) Heritage Music Press, 15/1655H 2001
- The Drinking Gourd (2 Part), Heritage Music Press, 15/1564h 2000
- Heaven (SATB), Mark Foster Music Co., MF 1016, 1999
- I Open My Mouth, Hinshaw Music, HMC1168 1990
- Heaven (TTBB), Mark Foster Music Co., MF 1016, 1988
- Ride the Chariot, Hinshaw Music, HMC931 1987
- I’m A Rollin’, Hinshaw Music, 1986

== Organizations and awards ==
- Florida American Choral Directors Association (ACDA)- past president
- Southern Division ACDA- past president
- ACDA-national board member, National Chair of Ethnic Music and Minority Concerns Committee
- Honored as a Living Legend by the African Diaspora Sacred Music and Musicians program
- Distinguished Service Award by Chorus America
- Owen F. Sellers Professor of Music-Florida State University
- International Federation for Choral Music
- National Association for Music Education (formerly Music Educators National Conference)
- American Society of Composers, Authors and Publishers (ASCAP)
- International Society for Music Education
- Pi Kappa Lambda
- Phi Mu Alpha Sinfonia.
- Choristers Guild - National Board of Directors

== Conducting credits (highlights) ==
- London Symphony Orchestra
- City of Birmingham Symphony Orchestra in England
- Berlin Radio Choir in Germany
- Netherlands Radio Choir
- Charlotte Symphony
- Tallahassee Symphony
- China’s People’s Liberation Orchestra
- Czech National Symphony Orchestra
