= George Marsh (musician) =

American jazz musician

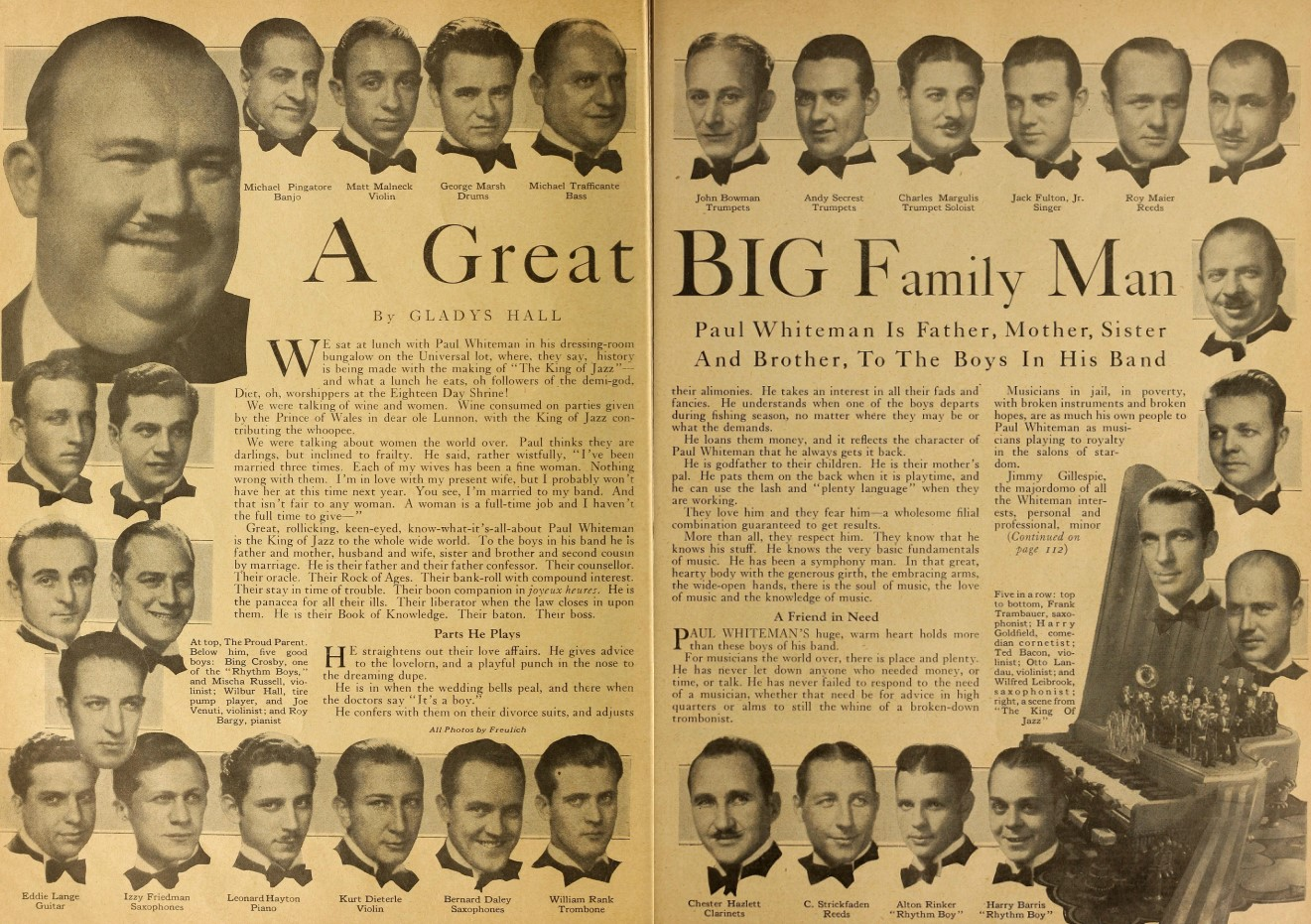
Paul Whiteman Orchestra - Motion Picture, June 1930

George Marsh (c. 1900 –1962) was an American jazz drummer. In the 1920s, he played with one of Paul Whiteman's bands, as well as recording with musicians including Frankie Trumbauer and Eddie Lang. From 1932 to 1934, Marsh played in an orchestra led by Ferde Grofé. He later moved to California, where he worked in film music. He died in Los Angeles in April 1962.
