= Billie Davies =

American jazz drummer and composer

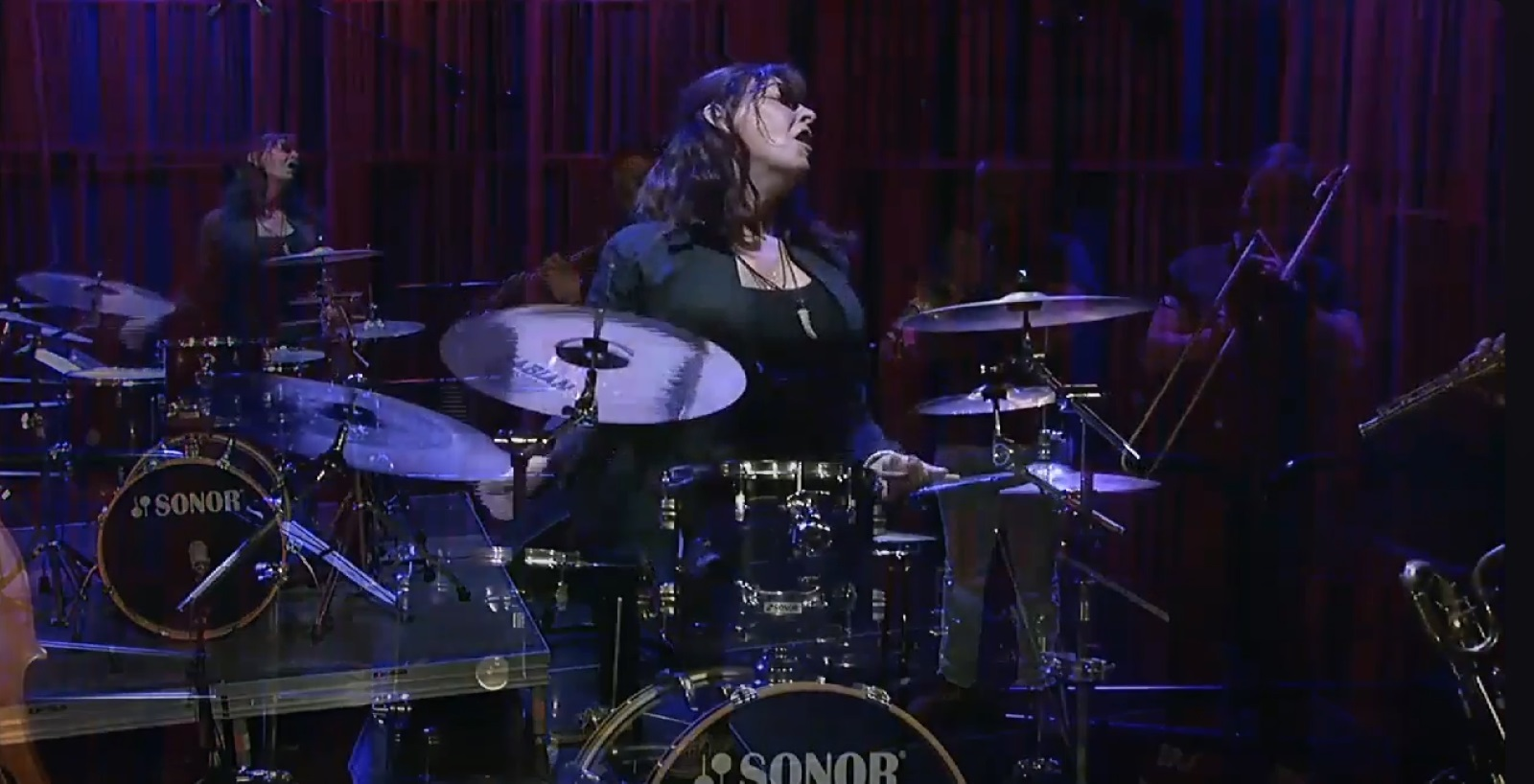
- Billie Davies during a performance at Music at The Mint at the New Orleans Jazz Museum in 2016 with The Bad Boyzzzz

Background information
- Also known as: Billie Davies
- Born: Billie Goegebeur; December 10, 1955 (age 70); Bruges, West Flanders, Belgium
- Origin: Morini, North Sea, coast of West-Flanders
- Genres: Jazz, Avant-garde jazz, Avant-garde, Free Improvisation
- Occupations: Musician, drummer, pianist, composer
- Instruments: Drums, Piano
- Years active: Mid 1980s-present
- Website: www.billiedaviesmusic.com

Billie Davies (née Goegebeur, December 10, 1955) is a Belgian-American female jazz drummer and composer best known for her avant-garde jazz and free improvisation playing since the mid-1990s. Davies was mentioned on JazzFuel.com in the article "Iconic Female Drummers", which appeared in October 2022 written by Isabel Marquez.

== Early life ==
Davies around 2-3 years old with her grandfather Maurice Clybouw in Zeebrugge

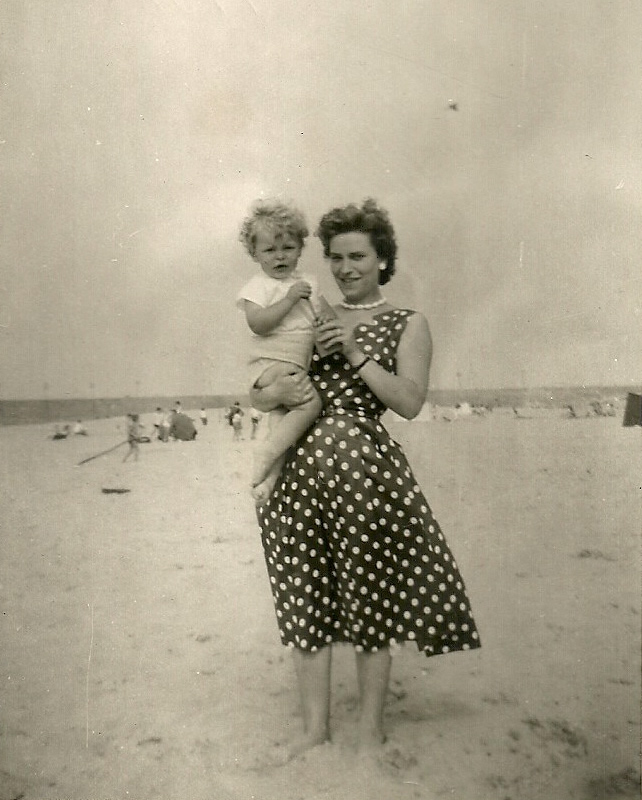
Davies with her mother Simone Clybouw on the beach in Zeebrugge, 1957

Billie Davies was born in Bruges, Belgium. Mostly growing up on the Belgian Coast, in Western Europe, at the North Sea, between Bruges, Knokke, Blankenberge and Zeebrugge, her grandfather, Maurice Clybouw (1912 Eernegem - 1984 Bruges), who immigrated with his parents to Paris, France, when he was 8, in 1920, and moved back to Belgium, Bruges in 1943, was the first to introduce her to the drums when Billie was about three years old. She has had a love relationship with rhythm and drums ever since. Her mother, Simone Clybouw (born in Rueil-Malmaison 1934), was her biggest influence on a personal and artistic level, and introduced her to Jazz and Classical music before Billie had made her first footstep. It was her mother who sent Billie to music school when she was 7 - which did not work out very well, as Billie started skipping classes - and who introduced her to live jazz and other music performances from when she was a toddler until she was a young teenager, and introduced her to the world of art, entertainers, painters, poets and professors, musicians and chefs. While Billie grew up with music from Louis Armstrong, Billie Holiday, Mahalia Jackson, Nina Simone, Edith Piaf, Frank Sinatra, Django Reinhardt, Ella Fitzgerald, Toots Thielemans, Joe Pass, Oscar Peterson, Benny Goodman, Glenn Miller, Mozart, Ravel, Paganini, Vivaldi and Chopin.

At 11, Billie began singing with school choirs and church choirs. At age 12, Billie's first serious stage performance was with a Youth Opera in Sint-Kruis (Bruges), a rendition of Romeo and Juliet fashioned Billie as Romeo due to her exceptional vocal range and sense of music and theatre. As she continued to develop her love of the arts, some of the highlights were, at age 14, her first performance as a drummer playing John Lennon’s “Power to the People” on plastic buckets, and aluminum lids in front of a crowd of about 100 kids at the beach in De Panne where she also sang a duet "Who'll Stop the Rain" by John Fogerty. At age 17, at the Royal Concert Building of Bruges, Koninklijke Stadsschouwburg Brugge, she directed and choreographed a group of 5 performers and co-performed in Sunshiny Days, which was inspired by writer Johnny Nash’s song "I Can See Clearly Now" and the music of Gladys Knight and the Pips. The audience demanded an encore. With DJing becoming such a huge part of our culture by the time she reached 18, Billie had started presenting professionally in the entertainment industry in Bruges where she specifically remembers the "Saaihalle", which now seems to be The Frietmuseum, where she enjoyed her first DJ adventures, "Le Carrousel", that since has transformed into a hotel, where she worked as a bartender/DJ from around 5pm to 2am and mostly entertained the Opera crowd, singers, directors, artists and Opera employees, and her absolute favorite, the hottest small jazz club in town in 1976–77, "Het Patriciershof" on the Jan Van Eyck Square, Jan van Eyckplein, where she worked from around 2-2:30 am to 8 am and where René, one of the owners and an old jazz friend of her mother, introduced her to the jazz of Thelonious Monk, Charlie Parker, Miles Davies, John Coltrane, Charles Mingus, Lester Bowie, Cecil Taylor, Archie Shepp and even more at the time considered obscure jazz musicians, and where she became a bartender and Dj, and entertained the Jazz crowd of Bruges deep nightlife that usually consisted of entertainers, musicians, painters, writers, chefs, hair stylists, fashion designers, models, gamblers and lots of whisky drinkers which were served "under the table" due to the existing prohibition of no alcohol to be served in public. All these experiences further enriched her love of rhythms and beats, of music, of jazz, cementing her desire to pursue drumming and fulfilling her need to entertain. As an early adult at 21, Billie became a solo singer for 1 year with the Royal Army Choir of Belgium. The high point of that adventure was singing at the Antwerp Opera with a complete symphonic orchestra. A year later, her voice underwent a dramatic change and she never felt comfortable singing again.

== Career ==
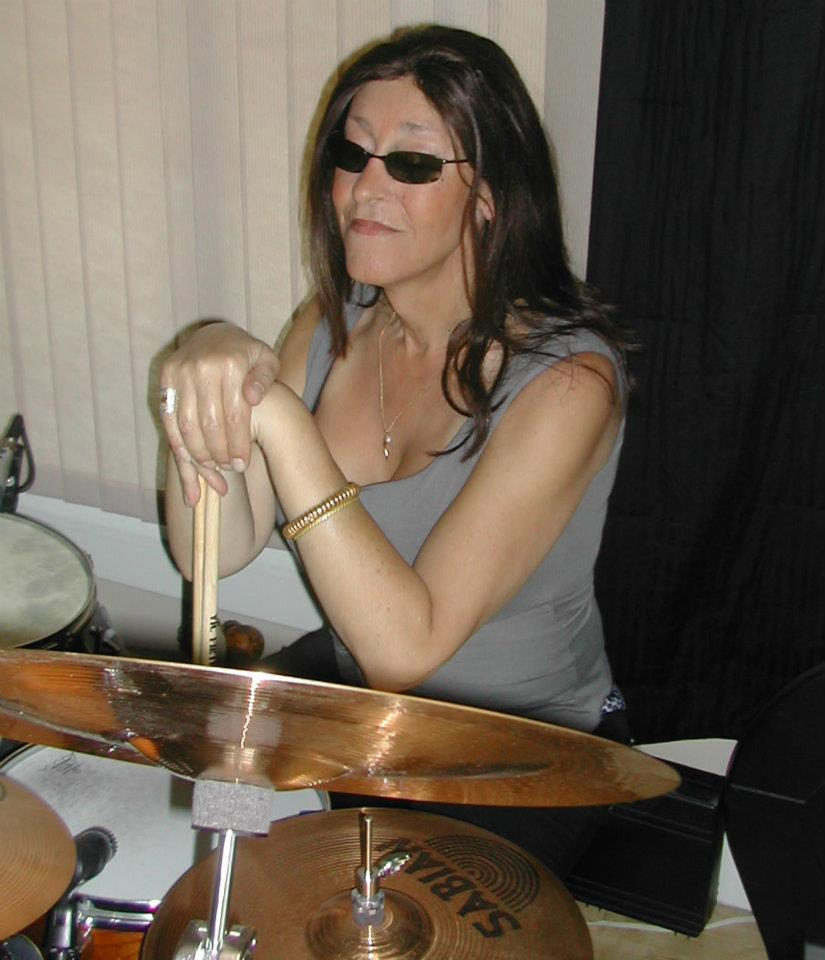
Billie Davies

"Davies is mostly an autodidact whose natural talent, relentless, explorative spirit and multifaceted experiences have led to an innovative approach to jazz." "With a background in Classical and Jazz and a lifetime of musical experiences in jams, performances, recordings and music production, the listener is treated to jazz inclinations within her ensembles that bristle with cutting-edge freshness."

At the age of 25, Davies started the transition to become a professional musician. Some of her influences stem from classical, gypsy, manouche, blues, jazz, free jazz and soul/funk. As a player, she feels that Max Roach, Al Foster, Billy Cobham, Jack De Johnette, Ed Thigpen, and Trilok Gurtu have been her biggest influences. Becoming completely immersed into the jazz, free jazz, and avant garde world, which is second nature for her stylistically, three years later, she was a professional drummer. She performed throughout the Netherlands, Belgium, France "A Revelation for her was meeting with legendary guitarist Ricardo Baliardo, but known by his stage name Manitas de Plata, as well as playing with bluesman Claude Mazet – both guitarists also respected the traditional rhythmic rules. Even with the Roma, she lived several years in their way of life, which her bohemian temper satisfied so that at twenty-five she refused the offer of the legendary drummer Max Roach to study at Berklee College of Music in Boston, after he heard her play in Montpellier on the street.", Italy, Northern Africa, Spain, Portugal and Greece for the next 7 years. She knew her love of drumming had become her life.

At a crossroads in her musical career, while living and playing and performing with Claude Mazet in the South of France (Montpellier, Toulouse, Biarritz, La Rochelle), Billie ended up receiving a talent grant from Max Roach to come study at Berklee College of Music, this was after he heard one of her tapes she laid down with a bass player in Montpellier, France. Billie was however having too much fun in the south of France, living the life of a gypsy jazz musician and therefore decided not to take the offer. In his words: “Hearing from your tape, you could learn more fundamental drumming techniques, but I also hear the natural drummer, so my advice is for you not to worry too much about your technical skill, you will develop your own, I can definitely hear that, but just in case that you might want to study in a good program, please accept my invitation in the form of a talent grant to come study at the Berklee College of Music, all you need to worry about is finding a place to live and some money to survive."

"Davies is not countering the modern jazz movement so much but rather stripping it down to its essence. When listening to Davies play, it's easier to think of her not as a drummer but a tonal painter who swipes brushstrokes with her drumsticks."

A move to the United States at 32 gave her an opportunity to play all over the west coast. In 1987 in Oregon, she played in Astoria, Seaside, Manzanita and Portland, where she met and played a few times with Leroy Vinnegar, and then later in early 1988 she moved to California, where she was mostly active in North Beach, San Francisco and in the Lower Haight district, Lower Haight, San Francisco, where she met and ended up playing a few times with John Handy and played frequently with infamous local jazz notables at their infamous and unforgiving jams, in her words: the best learning school she ever had. She recorded two albums in the mid-nineties, "Cobra Basemento" and "Dreams" with Saul Kaye on guitar, Michael Godwin on bass and Lee Elfenbein on upright bass (on Dreams), "the infamous boombox recordings" in the San Francisco Bay Area. In December 1997 she moved to Napa, California, where for a little while she held a jazz jam at a local jazz bar on Sunday evenings with Drew Waters on bass and other musicians, such as Pierre Swärd from Sweden, and performed a lot of invitationals in the Bay Area with local pro jazz and blues bands. In 2002 she became a US Citizen in San Francisco. In 2009, she made Los Angeles, California her home base and in 2011, in Hollywood, she began writing for her new album all about Love. and started the process of choosing musicians to develop her sound for the album. In June 2012 she independently released all about Love. with Tom Bone Ralls on trombone and Oliver Steinberg on bass. In August 2012, she began writing all original material for her album 12 VOLT and began her search for the right musicians. In April 2013, Davies recorded 12 VOLT with Daniel Coffeng on guitar and Adam Levy on bass. It was published in September 2013 and released on October 10, 2013. In March 2014 she moved her operations to New Orleans where she since permanently resides and works as a New Orleans Musician. In April 2015 she recorded Hand in Hand in the Hand of the Moon. An homage to Serge Vandercam (Copenhagen, Denmark, 1924 - Wavre, Belgium, March 10, 2005). A symphony inspired by paintings by Serge Vandercam and drums by Billie Davies (Bruges, Belgium, 1955). The painter influenced by the drummer and the drummer influenced by the painter over a period of three days of the full moon. A collaborative work, conceived in 1995 resulting 20 years later in a series of 8 paintings and a jazz symphony of 8 musical movements. The album was recorded at her studio on the west bank of the Mississippi River, just outside New Orleans, with Alex Blaine on tenor sax, Branden Lewis on trumpet, Evan Oberla on trombone, and Ed Strohsahl on upright bass.

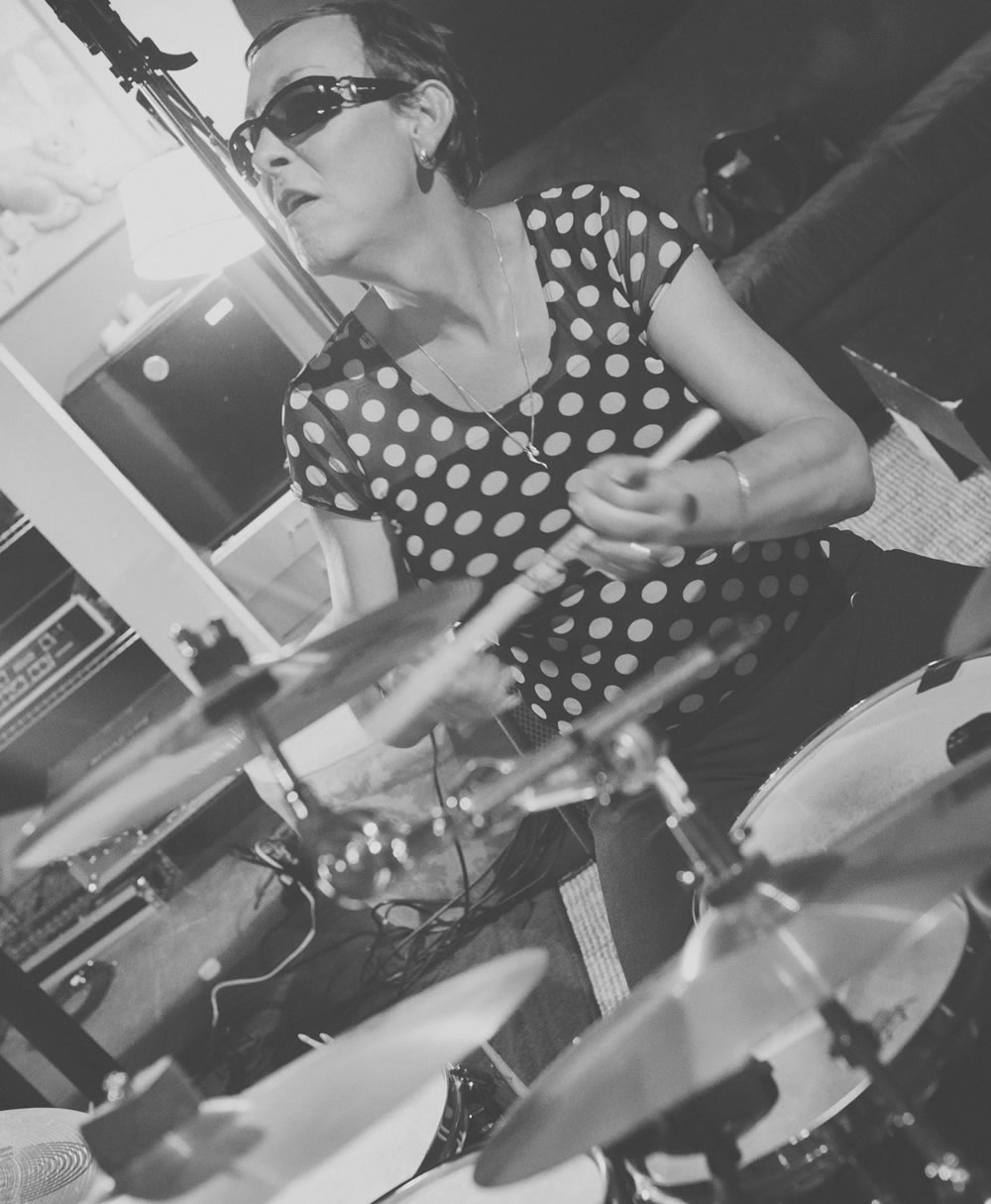
Jazz drummer Davies

“Billie Davies is a very accomplished free-jazz drummer. Born in Belgium, she now lives in New Orleans, having spent much of her life living peripatetically. Previous reviewers have made much of the self-taught nature of her drumming. I defy any listener to distinguish her playing from someone ‘schooled’ in jazz drumming. There is a vitality and fluidity in the way that she plays the drum kit and this is what I mean by the idea that her stories explain her drumming; she speaks through the drums to the other players, asking questions of them and replying with the fusion of styles that she has built up over her travels.” In November 2015 “BILLIE & The Bad Boyzzzz” Jazz Ensemble came to the stage with Evan Oberla on trombone, Branden Lewis on trumpet, Ari Kohn on reeds and Oliver Watkinson on upright bass. In February 2016 she formed Billie Davies Trio with Evan Oberla and Oliver Watkinson, moving into a very electric, Nu jazz direction. Summer of 2016 Billie Davies started A Nu Experience with IRIS P on vocals, Evan Oberla on electric piano, synthesizer and trombone, Oliver Watkinson on electric bass and Billie on electronic drums. By the end of that summer the new recording "On Hollywood Boulevard" had become a reality and so established BILLIE DAVIES - A Nu Experience - Feat. IRIS P. December 10, 2016 Billie Davies released "On Hollywood Boulevard". It became a January 2017 Editor's Pick on DownBeat.com.

In December 2017 New Orleans surprised her by nominating her for "Best Contemporary Jazz Artist" in New Orleans by Best Of The Beat 2017, OffBeat Magazine.

"As a bandleader, Davies delivers an ambitious program that incorporates r&b-flavored vocals, propulsive bass lines, drum patterns with a swing feel, occasionally blues-tinged keyboard work, growling trombone, epic prog-rock synthesizer washes and brief bouts of hip-hop turntableism, all tied together with an improviser's approach."

In September 2018 she released "Perspectives II" with Billie Davies Trio, featuring Iris P on vocals, with whom she also recorded "On Hollywood Boulevard", as well as Ari Kohn on woodwinds, and Allie Porter on vocals and spoken word. "The spiritual jazz tradition, as exemplified by John Coltrane, Alice Coltrane and Pharoah Sanders, has been having a resurgence over the past few years in places like Los Angeles and Great Britain. Now here is evidence that some musicians in New Orleans are going down that path as well. Billie Davies is a drummer from Belgium who now lives and works in the Big Easy and this recording, available only in download form, captures a live performance of her trio, plus added guests, creating over an hour of heady, uplifting music. This music never stays in one place for long, progressing naturally through straight jazz, jazz-rock, free jazz and other sub-genres, with the voices of Allie and Iris P dramatically shouting or sensually cooing as the mood dictates. This is a loose, free-flowing concoction not quite like anything else out there. Like the best forward-thinking music, Billie Davies' work reminds you of many different things but in the end, it is its own original beast, as powerful as anything more well-known musicians have created this year."

In 2020, she recorded "Whadeva Live" with Damani Butler and Maude Caillat. In 2021 Billie Davies started a project, "Music for the 24th century", a study which she called "Pandemos" with Branden Lewis and Damani Butler. In 2024, she released the album "On Hollywood Boulevard (Live at The Mint in New Orleans)" from a live recording in 2017 and the single "Thinking of Marie Laveau" from a 2016 recording with Evan Oberla and Oliver Watkinson.

In April of 2025, she released a retrospective album "Retrospectives (In The Key Of Jazz)" with free improvisation and avant-garde music recorded during rehearsals and performances between 2012 and 2018 in Hollywood, in Los Angeles, and in New Orleans. As stated by Billie Davies in an announcement: "I want to end up with music that is not written down but is felt and expressed at that moment of playing, of recording, of performing, of expressing. This deliberate moment of choices, chances and inspirations may become a specific type of music, but it never ends up being a predetermined or planned music, the notes played are never written down. I just want to end up with something where I hear unexpected, emotional, passionate, challenging music never heard before."

== Accolades ==
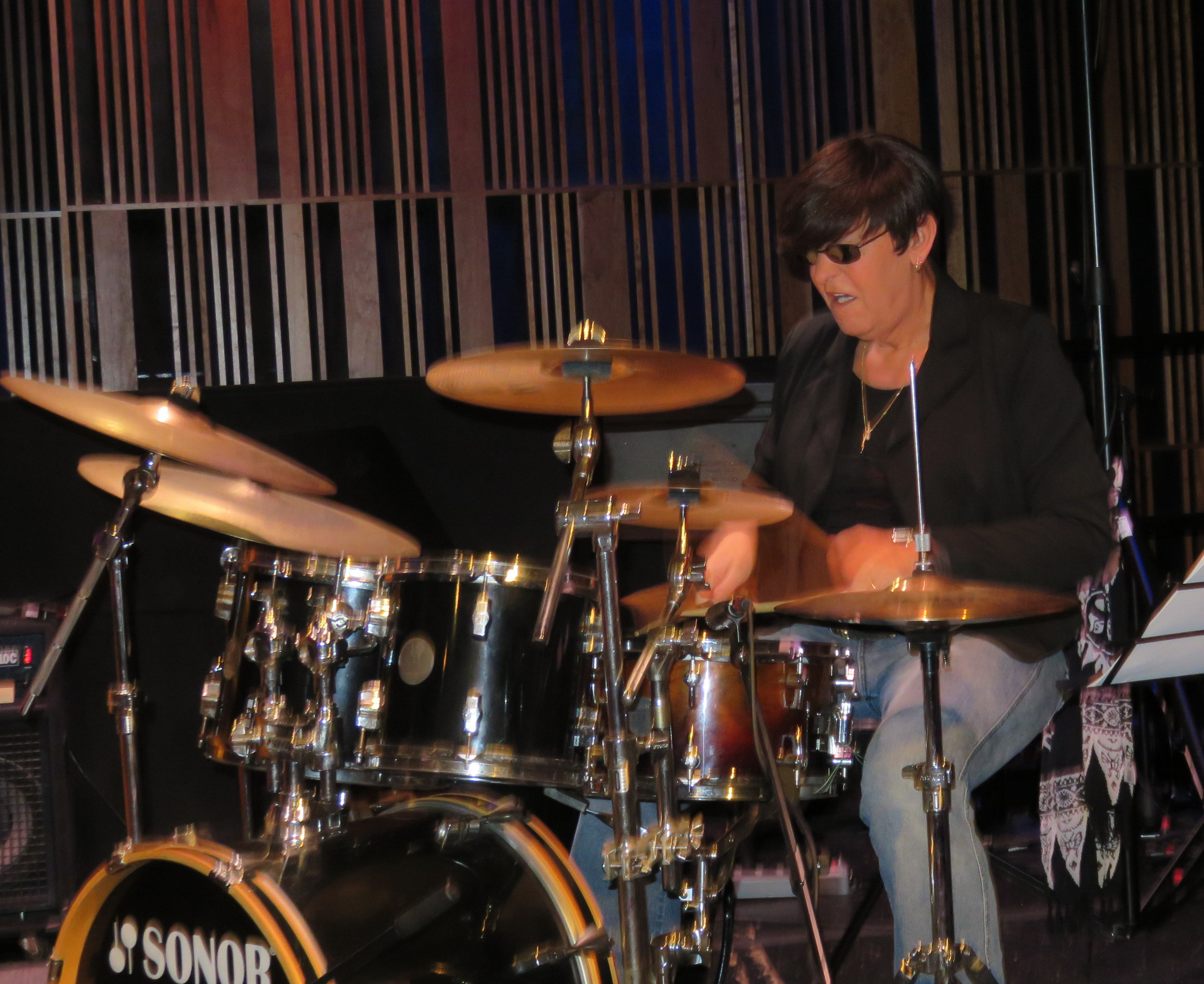
Davies during a live performance at Music At The Mint in 2018

Her third release after a hiatus of six years was all about Love., which had a surprising result on the CMJ Jazz College Radio Charts and achieved the #1 top jazz add in new album adds. all about Love. went on to stay in the Top 40 jazz for four consecutive weeks. CMJ Top 40 JAZZ:

1. 1 CMJ Top Jazz Adds CMJ issue #1262 – Aug 23, 2012.
2. 28 CMJ Top 40 Jazz Chart issue #1263 – Aug 29, 2012.
3. 14 CMJ Top 40 Jazz Chart issue #1264 – Sep 6, 2012.
4. 14 CMJ Top 40 Jazz Chart issue #1265 – Sep 13, 2012.
5. 20 CMJ Top 40 Jazz Chart issue #1265 – Sep 20, 2012.

all about Love. was also very well received in Canada where the album ended up in the Top 10 on three different !Earshot Jazz charts.

1. 5 !Earshot Jazz National Jazz Charts w/e Sep 25, 2012.
2. 2 !Earshot Jazz CJSW 90.9 MHz – Calgary Jazz w/e Sep 25, 2012.
3. 8 !Earshot Jazz CJSR 88.5 MHz – Edmonton Jazz w/e Nov 20, 2012.

One year later, after finishing 12 VOLT, she received a nomination for "Jazz Artist of the Year" at the 23rd Annual Los Angeles Music Awards on September 26, 2013.

She is the recipient of the "Jazz Artist" Award for 2013 by the 23rd Annual Los Angeles Music Awards on November 14, 2013.

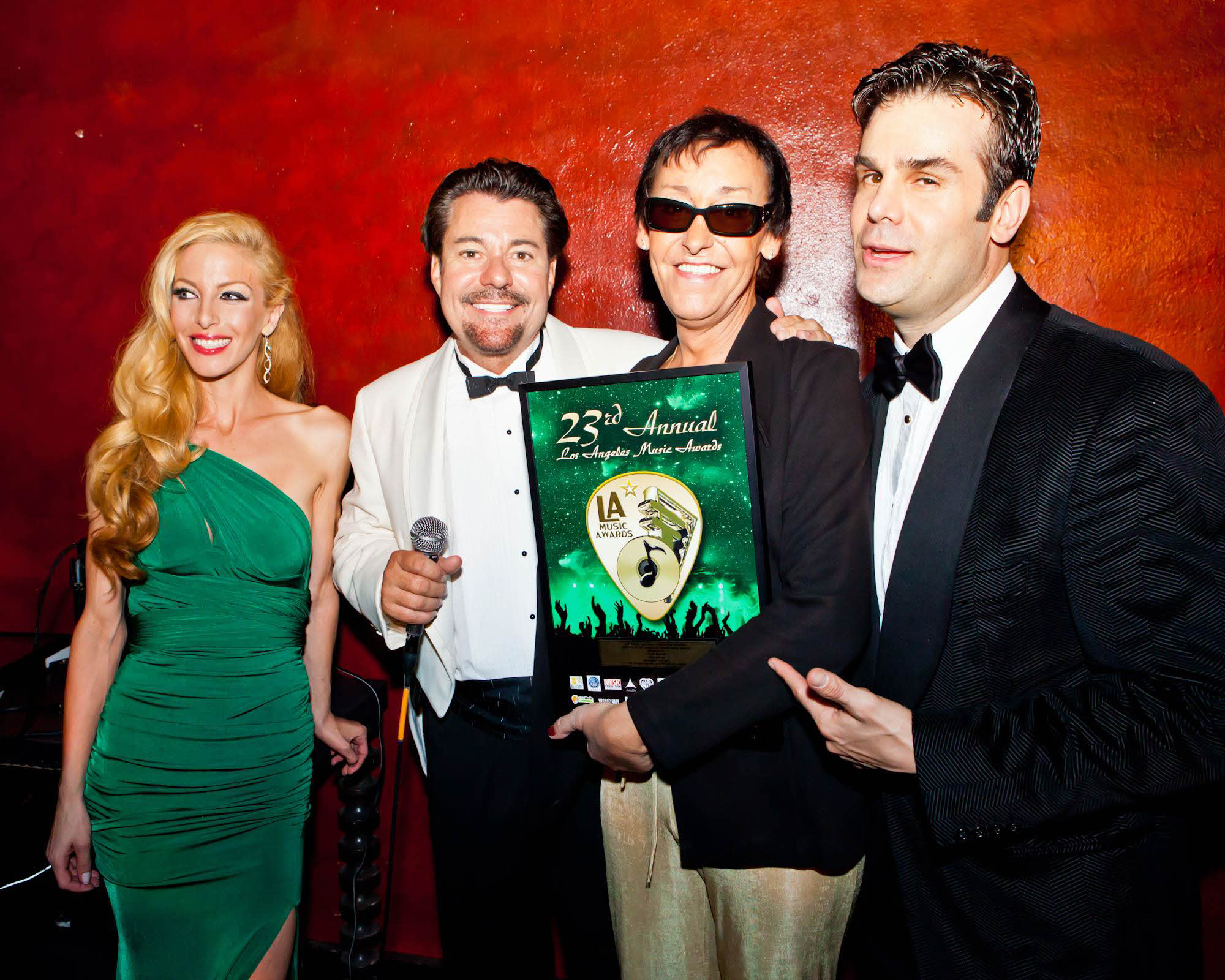
Davies receiving the 2013 "Jazz Artist" of the year Award at the 23rd LA Music Awards at AVALON, Hollywood

She received more national and international attention due to a player feature, "BILLIE DAVIES '20 Years Stronger', published in Downbeat Magazine May 2016 edition. Her music has been receiving attention by jazz reviewers, critics and jazz radio stations since her comeback to the jazz scene in 2011.

Billie Davies was nominated for "Best Contemporary Jazz Artist" in New Orleans by Best Of The Beat 2017, OffBeat Magazine.

Billie Davies was nominated for "Best Drummer" in New Orleans by 2019 Best Of The Beat Awards, OffBeat Magazine.

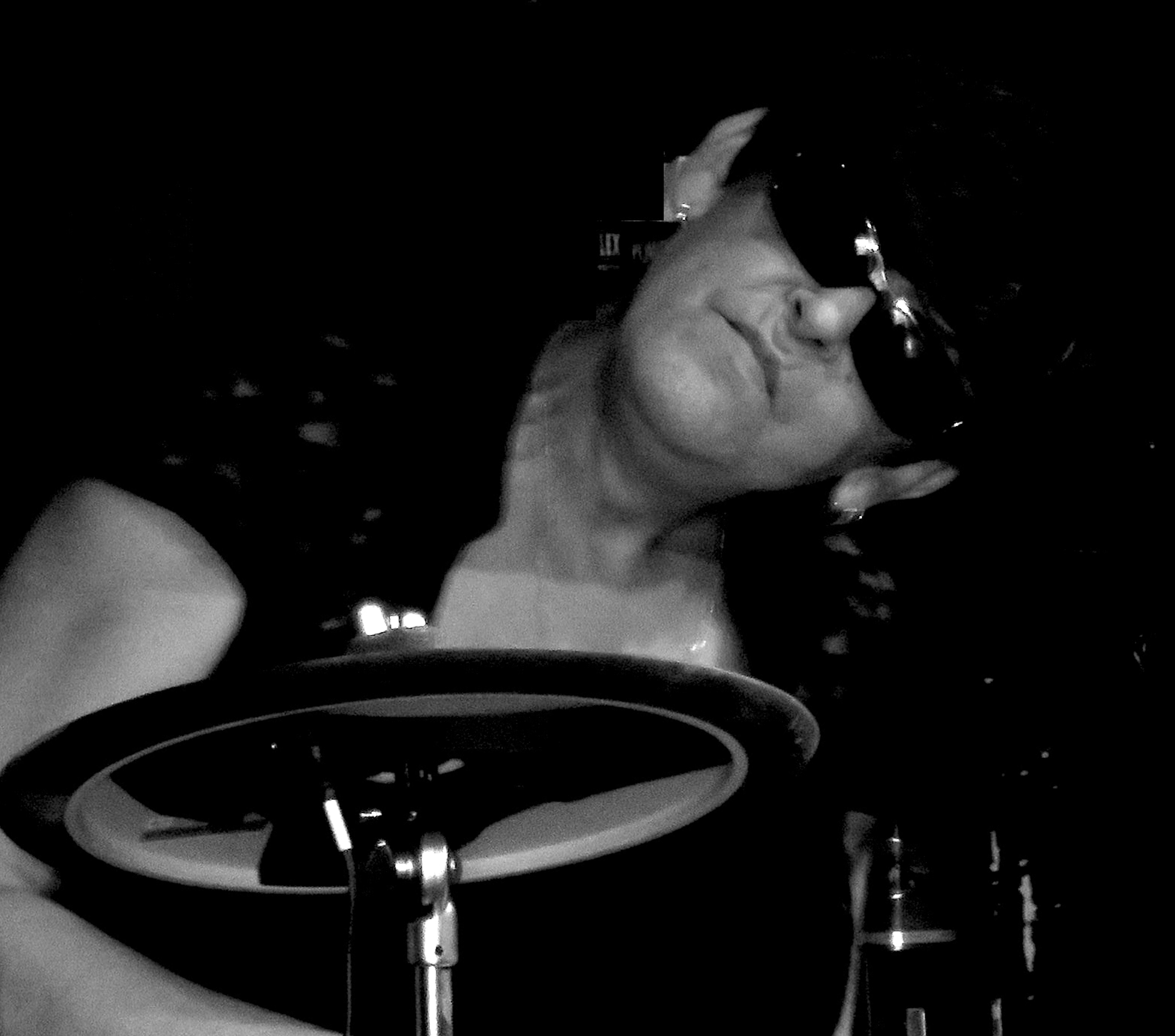
Billie Davies Live in New Orleans

Billie Davies named one of the Iconic Female Jazz Drummers on JazzFuel.com in 2022. She was mentioned amongst a small group of female jazz drummers in time amongst whom are other contemporary female drummers from the US, Terri Lyne Carrington, Cindy Blackman Santana and Allison Miller.

== Discography ==
=== As leader ===
- 2004: Cobra Basemento with Saul Kaye, Michael Godwin
- 2005: Dreams with Saul Kaye, Michael Godwin, Lee Elfenbein
- 2012: all about Love. (Cobra Basement) with Tome Bone Ralls on trombone, Oliver Steinberg on upright bass and electric bass
- 2013: 12 VOLT (Cobra Basement) with Daniel Coffeng on electric guitar, Adam Levy on upright bass
- 2015: Hand In Hand In The Hand Of The Moon (Cobra Basement) with Alex Blaine on tenor sax, Branden Lewis on trumpet, Evan Oberla on trombone and Ed Strohsahl on upright bass.
- 2016: On Hollywood Boulevard (Self Released) with Evan Oberla on electric piano, synthesizer and trombone, Oliver Watkinson on electric bass and IRIS P. vocals and spoken word.
- 2018: Perspectives (Self Released) with Evan Oberla on upright piano, synthesizer and trombone, Oliver Watkinson on upright bass featuring Ari Kohn on woodwinds, IRIS P. vocals and spoken word and Allie Porter vocals and spoken word.
- 2020: Whadeva Live (Self Released) with Maude Caillat on woodwinds, and Damani Butler on synthesizer, electronics, and sampling.
- 2024: Thinking Of Marie Laveau (Self Released) with Evan Oberla on keys, synthesizer and trombone, Oliver Watkinson on electric bass.
- 2024: On Hollywood Boulevard (Live at The Mint in New Orleans) (Self Released) with Evan Oberla on piano, synthesizer and trombone, Oliver Watkinson on electric bass featuring IRIS P. vocals and spoken word.
- 2025: Retrospectives (In The Key Of Jazz) (Self Released) with Tome Bone Ralls on trombone, Oliver Steinberg on upright bass and electric bass, Larry the guitar player Marx on electric guitar, Daniel Coffeng on electric guitar and guitar synth, Jacob Bartfield on electric bass, Jonathan Solomon on upright bass, Evan Oberla on trombone and piano, Oliver Watkinson on upright bass, Branden James Lewis on trumpet, Ari Kohn on woodwinds, Allie Porter, vocals and spoken word.
