= Tallahassee Symphony Orchestra =

American orchestra based in Tallahassee, Florida

T is for Tallahassee: the ABCs of Our Musical City
- Cover of T is for Tallahassee: the ABCs of our Musical City, a publication of the Tallahassee Symphony Orchestra
- Editor: Mary Ann Lindley
- Author: Tallahassee Symphony Orchestra
- Illustrators: Nathan Archer, Rita Barker, Marina Brown, Terrie Corbett, Elizabeth Davis, Starlene DeBord, Diane Dyal, Rosemary Ferguson, Elizabeth George, Dean Gioia, Valerie Goodwin, Debo Groover, Gerald Grow, Anne Hempel, Roopali Kambo, Mary Lawson, Nan Liu, Yoshiko Murdick, Brinda Pamulapati, Billy Penn, Mary Proctor, Eluster Richardson, Joe Roache, Dan Taylor, Mary Tippiin-Moody, Mark Wallheiser
- Cover artist: Elizabeth Lampman Davis
- Language: English
- Subject: Music, Tallahassee
- Genre: Coffee table book
- Published: November 19, 2023
- Publisher: Pediment Publishing
- Publication date: 2023
- Publication place: United States
- Media type: Print
- ISBN: 978-1638460688

The Tallahassee Symphony Orchestra is an American orchestra based in Tallahassee, Florida that was founded in 1979, with Nicholas Harsanyi as director. Harsanyi was a noted violist and a student of Béla Bartók, who later played chamber music with Albert Einstein at Princeton University. After Nicholas Harsanyi's death, the baton was handed on to several guest conductors before being passed to David Hoose, who led the orchestra from 1993 to 2005. Miriam Burns directed the orchestra from 2006 to 2013, and was the first female music director of the orchestra. Director Darko Butorac took over in July 2013. Butorac concluded his 11-year tenure in May 2024. The orchestra is currently searching for its next music director and has selected five finalists.

The orchestra usually performs four formal concerts each year, in Ruby Diamond Auditorium at Florida State University, along with a special holiday concert, and a youth concert. Professors and graduate students from the Florida State University College of Music are often prominent among the performers.

== Collaboration with visual artists ==
In 2023, the Tallahassee Symphony Orchestra collaborated with musicians and visual artists to release a coffee table book called “T is for Tallahassee: the ABCs of Our Musical City.” Featuring artwork curated by Amanda Karioth Thompson, the Tallahassee Symphony Orchestra's website describes the book as “TSO’s own love letter to our artistic community.” The book depicts Tallahassee history, iconic figures, local venues, and events. It showcases the artwork of twenty six Tallahassee artists, one for each letter of the alphabet. The book was produced as part of a bicentennial celebration for the city of Tallahassee, Florida.
