= Jan van Eyckplein =

Square in Bruges, Belgium

Coordinates: 51.2116°N 3.2259°E

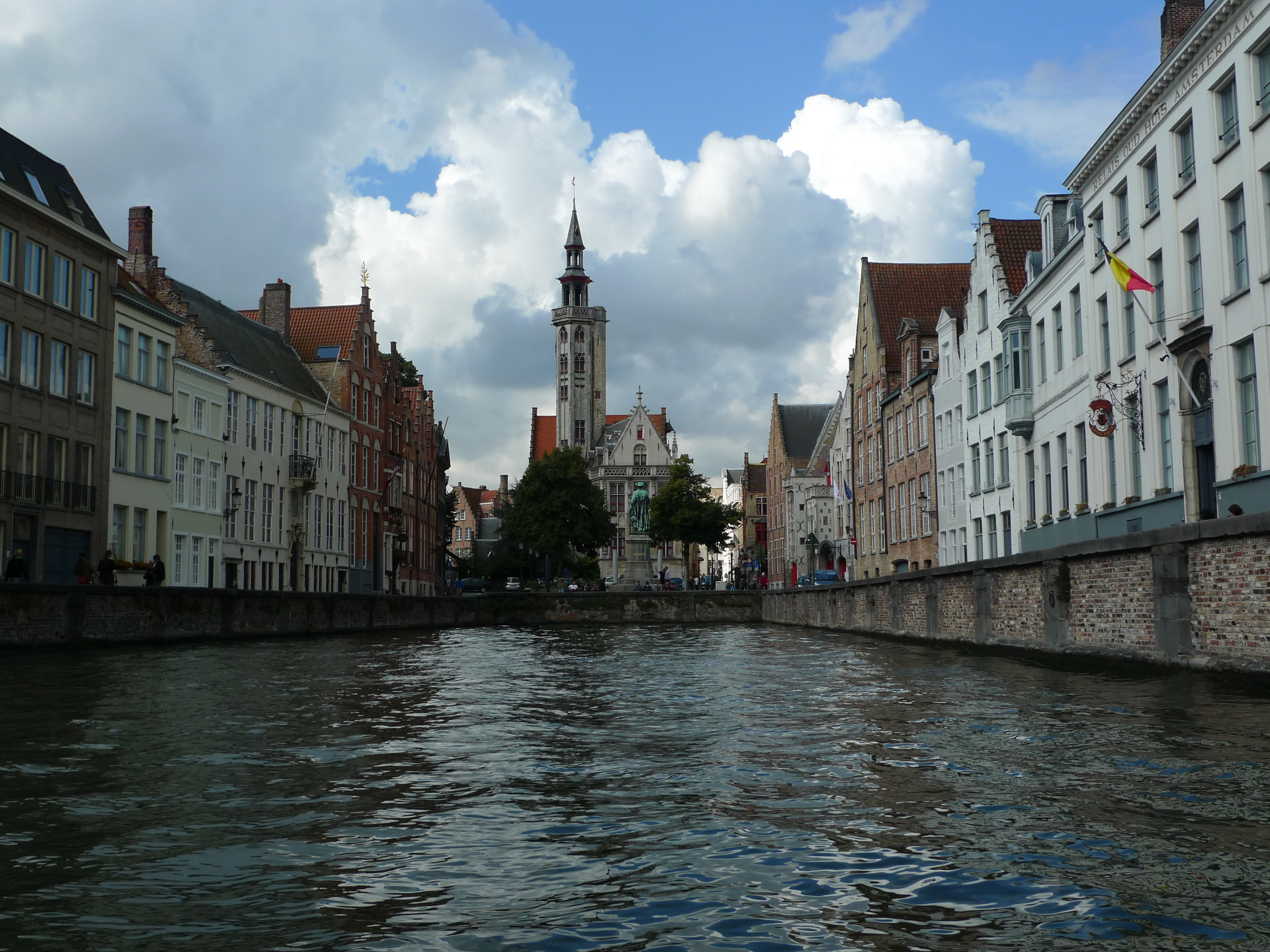
Jan van Eyckplein viewed from a nearby canal

The Jan van Eyckplein (English: Jan van Eyck Square) is a square in Bruges, West Flanders, Belgium. The square is named for noted Northern Renaissance painter Jan van Eyck. It is located at the intersection of the Academiestraat, the Spiegelrei and the Spanjaardstraat.
