= David Cordle =

American professor

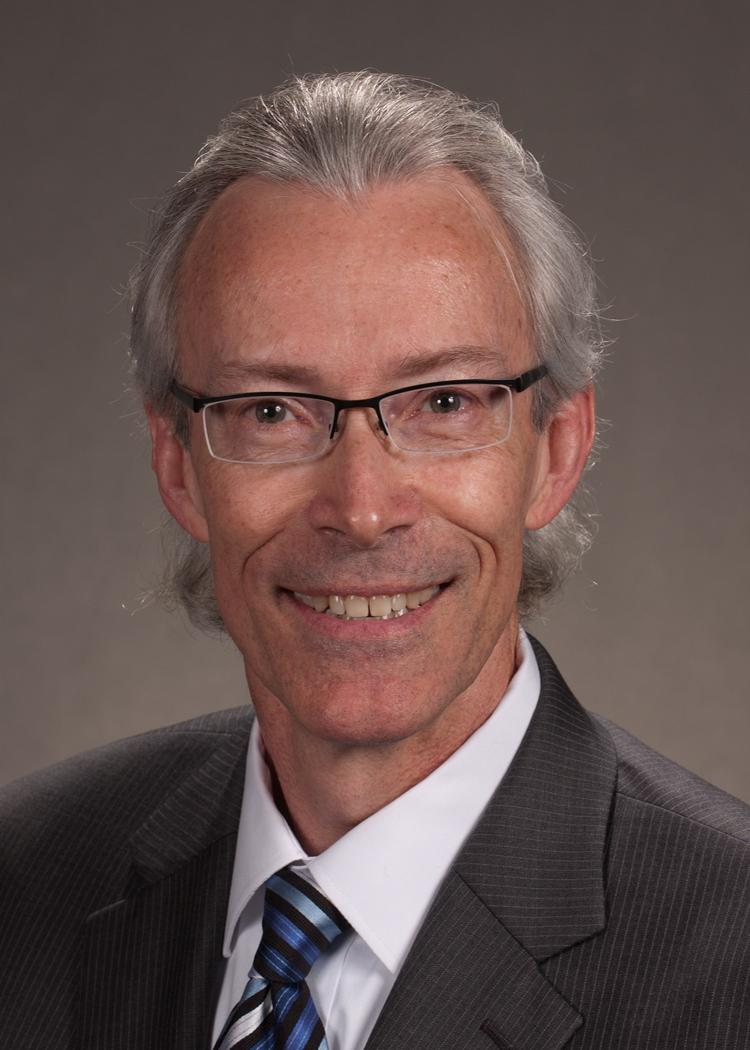

Provost of Emporia State University
- In office July 1, 2013 – June 30, 2021
- President: Michael Shonrock; Allison Garrett
- Preceded by: Tes Mehring
- Succeeded by: George Arasimowicz

Dean of the College of Arts and Sciences University of North Carolina Wilmington
- In office July 1, 2005 – May 31, 2013
- Preceded by: Jo Ann Seiple
- Succeeded by: Aswani Volety

Personal details
- Born: September 27, 1954 (age 71) Rome, Georgia
- Spouse: Pamela
- Education: Shorter College; Florida State University
- Profession: Professor
- Salary: $191,249

David Perry Cordle (born September 27, 1954, in Rome, Georgia) is an American professor and served as provost and vice president for academic affairs at Emporia State University, a position he held from July 2013 to June 2021. Cordle attended Shorter College for his bachelor's degree, and he received his master's and doctorate in music from Florida State University.

== Career ==
Cordle began his academic career at William Woods University in 1981 and then would go on to serve as the music department chair from 1983 to 1985. In 1986, Cordle moved from Missouri to Richmond, Virginia, to serve as the assistant chair of the music department at Virginia Commonwealth University until 1989, when he was promoted to associate professor and chair. In 1998, Cordle became the dean of Longwood University's College of Arts and Sciences, and on July 1, 2005, Cordle began his eight-year tenure as the University of North Carolina at Wilmington's liberal arts dean.

Academic offices
Preceded by Tes Mehring	Provost and VP of Academic Affairs at Emporia State University; July 1, 2013–June 30, 2021	Succeeded by George Arasimowicz
