= Don Mumford =

American jazz musician

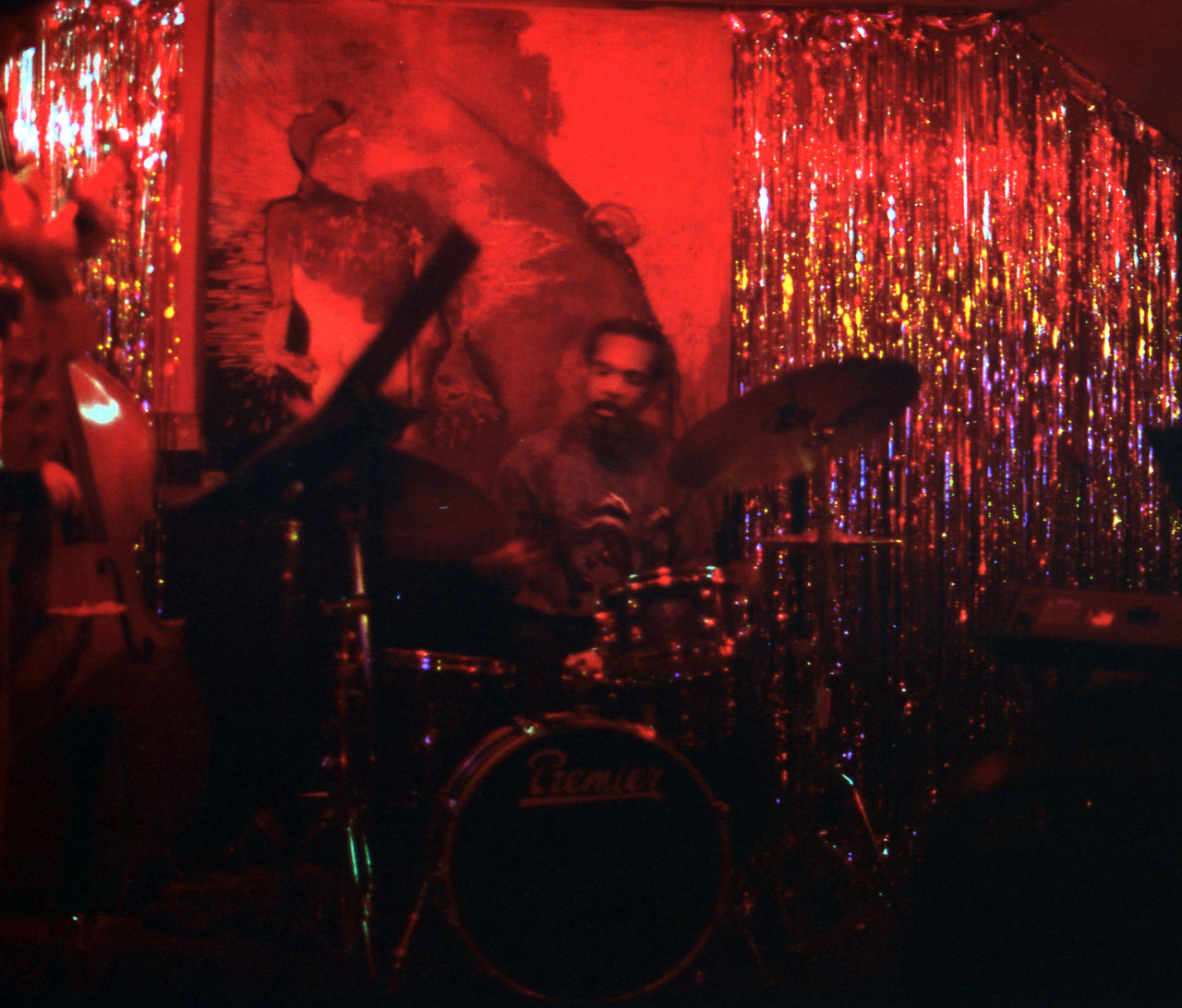
Don Mumford playing at the Taproom in Lawrence, KS, circa 2002

Don Mumford (February 9, 1954 — July 6, 2007) was an American musician who was noted in jazz circles.

== Biography ==
Donald Dean Mumford was born in Lawrence, Kansas, on February 9, 1954, to Robert Herman and Mildred Elisabeth Brown Mumford. He had three brothers, Dale "Butch" Mumford, Marvin Mumford and John Mumford as well as two Sisters Katherine Mumford and Louise Mumford. He attended Lawrence public schools and Lawrence High School. He attended Mount Hood Junior College in Portland, Oregon.

At the time of his passing, Mumford was a resident of Des Moines, Iowa. He was struck by an automobile while riding a bicycle in Ames, Iowa. He was taken to the Iowa Methodist Hospital in Des Moines, where he died on July 6. He was buried in Maple Grove Cemetery in Lawrence after a July 12 memorial service in Lawrence.

== Musical career ==
Mumford had an active career as a musician and private instructor. He played the drums and performed with several bands, including Sun Ra and Dollar Brand. He toured with various bands throughout Europe, Africa, Australia and the U.S. He was lead drummer on the album Motivation recorded by Rene van Helsdingen.

In addition to South African jazz pioneer Abdullah Ibrahim (Dollar Brand), during several productive years in the active music scene of Portland, Oregon, Mumford's mentors included drummer Mel Brown and saxophonist Jim Pepper. While in Oregon, Mumford played drums in such diverse settings as the play Red Beans and Rice, Carl Smith's Natural Gas Company and in one especially memorable jazz gig together with Ted Trimble, Steve Christofferson and Nancy King in Eugene. In the 1980s Mumford toured Africa and Europe with Abdullah Ibrahim and Essiet Okon Essiet, as well as with the famed aggregation of the late Sun Ra. In 2007 Mumford showed local artists and community members in Ames, Iowa the importance of a creative community. He helped start a movement to develop the Ames music scene and is the inspiration of the band Mumford's, based in Ames.
