= Rich Galichon =

American drummer (born 19688

Richie Alan (born Richard Alan Galichon; 1968 in NY) is an independent studio drummer. He grew up in Valley Stream, New York and attended Valley Stream Central High School. He earned a Bachelor of Arts in Computer Science from Queens College, City University of New York and pursued a Master of Business Administration degree specializing in Information Systems Management at The George Washington University School of Business. Soon after, he founded a successful information technology consulting practice and earned a spot on the American Express Platinum list of top technology entrepreneurs under 30.

During his earlier years, Richie Alan took weekly lessons at the Downs School of Music for 4 years. While studying there, Richie Alan emerged as a three-time gold medalist and one-time silver medalist in the Long Island Drum Teachers Association. Years later, he expanded his studies with legendary jazz drummer Joe Morello (Dave Brubeck Quartet) and classic-rock drummer Simon Kirke (Bad Company).

Mostly known in the underground New York music scene, Richie Alan's drumming achieved a modest following, garnering praise from well-established drummers including Tommy Aldridge (Ozzy Osbourne, Whitesnake), Bill Bruford (Yes, King Crimson), and Jonathan Mover (Fuel, Everlast, Alice Cooper)

Legendary guitarist Les Paul presented Richie Alan with an autographed custom Gibson Les Paul guitar at a Beacons in Jazz award gala in 2003.

Richie Alan performed on drums and percussion with John Ford of the Strawbs and is on Ford's 2014 "No Talkin'" album. Richie Alan has also performed with Ian Lloyd (Stories), Simon Kirke (Bad Company) and Southern Rock tribute band Southern Exposure. Richie Alan has also performed on dozens of independent albums as an "Internet Session Drummer".

He cites the following as his influences: John Bonham, Neil Peart, Steve Smith, Dave Weckl and Lee Kerslake.

In addition to his musical pursuits, Richie Alan is an accomplished martial artist holding a 4th-degree Black Belt in Chinese Goju Karate, a style founded by Ron Van Clief, who awarded him the rank with Glenn Perry. The tradition draws from a lineage that traces back through Peter Urban, Gogen Yamaguchi, and Chojun Miyagi. He also writes poetry.

Richie Alan plays Saluda cymbals live and in the studio.
