= Peter Magadini =

American drummer (1942–2023)

Pete Magadini
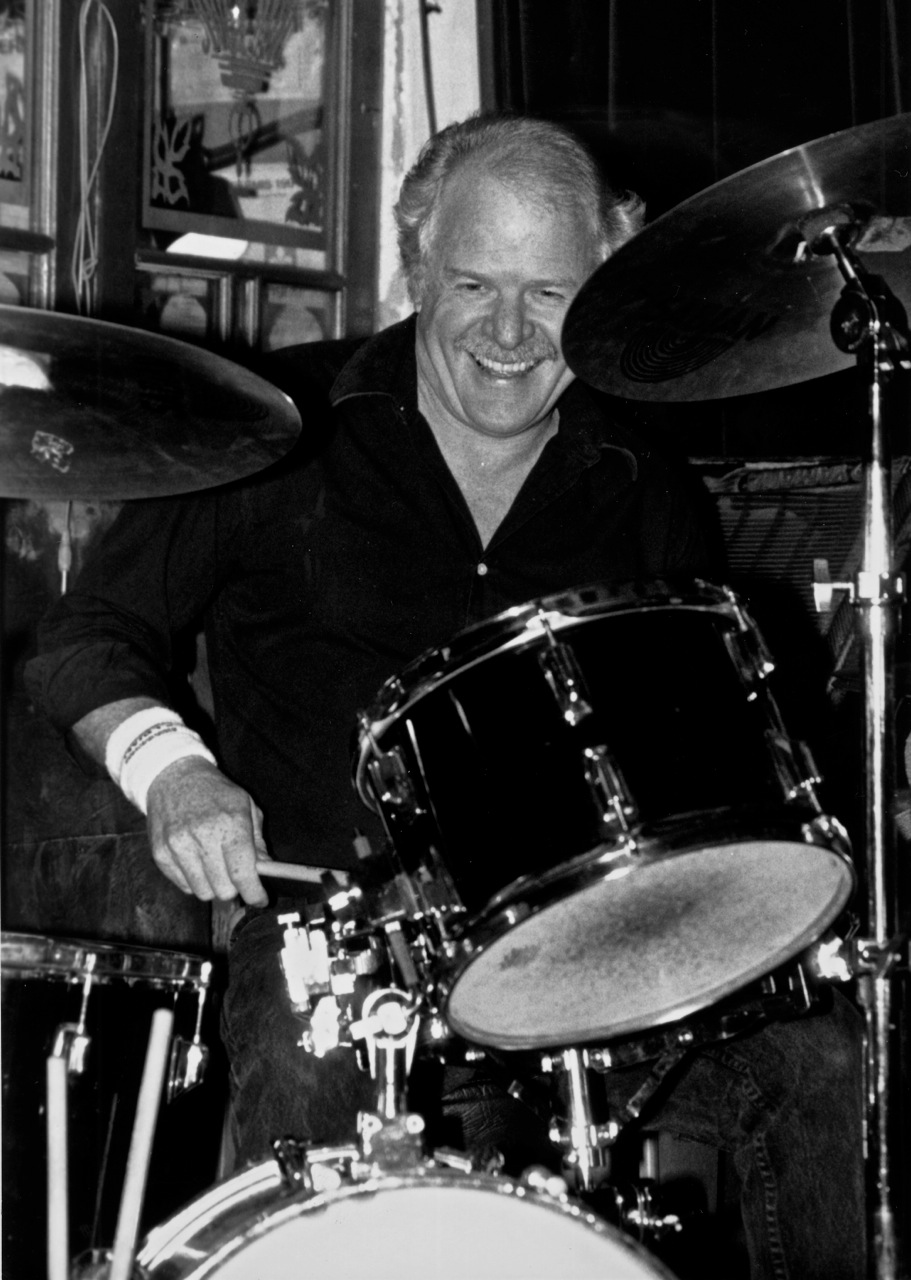

Background information
- Born: Peter Charles Magadini; January 25, 1942; Great Barrington, Massachusetts, U.S.
- Died: August 13, 2023 (aged 81) Boise, Idaho, U.S.
- Genres: Jazz blues & funk, country and New Orleans (second line)+ orchestra percussion
- Occupations: Drummer; percussionist; composer; drumset educator; producer
- Instruments: drum set; orchestral percussion; hand percussion
- Years active: 1960–2023
- Website: http://www.petermagadini.com

Peter Charles Magadini (January 25, 1942 – August 13, 2023) was an American drummer, percussionist, educator and author. He is known for his body of work (instructional books and videos) concerning the comprehension and execution of musical polyrhythms, especially the books The Musician's Guide to Polyrhythms and Polyrhythms for the Drumset. Magadini has recorded and performed with George Duke, Diana Ross, Bobbie Gentry, Al Jarreau, Buddy DeFranco, John Handy and Mose Allison.

== Biography ==
Magadini was born in Great Barrington, Massachusetts, to Charles and Ruth Magadini. At the age of six, the family moved to Palm Springs, California, where he played in the elementary school band. Magadini's professional career began recording singles for Lee Hazlewood and Lester Sill while attending high school in Phoenix, Arizona. In Phoenix he studied with his first and most influential teacher Donald Bothwell and was heavily influenced by the playing of Max Roach.

In 1960, Magadini studied drum set with Roy Burns at the Henry Adler Drum School in New York City. He then enrolled at the San Francisco Conservatory of Music where he studied timpani with New York Philharmonic timpanist Roland Kohloff, graduating with a Bachelor of Music degree in 1965. During his time in San Francisco he formed a trio with keyboardist George Duke, also a student at the Conservatory, and performed with the Oakland Symphony Orchestra. In 1973 he graduated from the University of Toronto with Master of Music in Percussion and Performance – "w.distinction".

In 1968, while teaching at his alma mater, Magadini was awarded a fellowship to perform with The Berkshire Music Festival Orchestra at Tanglewood. The next year he moved to Los Angeles where he taught drums at the Hollywood Professional Drum Shop and played with the Don Menza quartet. Magadini toured with Bobbie Gentry through 1969 before joining Diana Ross' first band as a solo artist. After touring with Ross from 1970 to 1971, he attended the University of Toronto, receiving a Master of Music degree in 1973.

In 1976 Magadini produced Polyrhthym, for IBis Records, featuring himself, George Duke, Don Menza and Dave Young. His second album, Bones Blues, with Dave Young, Don Menza and Wray Downs, received a Juno Award nomination for Best Jazz Album of the Year in 1979. Magadini has also performed extensively with and produced recordings for blues-jazz vocalist Mose Allison.

From 1988 to 1997, Magadini taught at McGill University and Concordia University in Montreal and at the Brubeck Institute of the University of the Pacific from 2003 to 2007. He also maintained a private teaching practice in the California Bay Area.

Magadini died on August 13, 2023, at the age of 81.

== Polyrhythms ==
Magadini is widely known for his interest and expertise in polyrhythms as applied in western music and drum set. Originally inspired by his studies with tabla player Mahapurush Misra in 1966, he has published two major works on the subject: Polyrhythms for the Drumset and Polyrhythms: The Musicians Guide, (first published in two volumes in 1967) which Modern Drummer magazine ranked sixth in their survey of "The 25 Best Drum Books." In 2012 he published The Official 26 Polyrhythm Rudiments.

== Discography ==
Year	Title	Label	Role	Notes
1970	Live at The Grove	Motown	Drummer	
1971	Diana	Motown	Drummer	
1976	Polyrhythm	IBis Recordings	Producer, drummer	
1977	Bones Blues	Sackville Records	Producer, drummer	1978 Juno Award Nominee
2000	Night Dreamers	Timeless Records	Producer, drummer	
2015	Mose Allison Live in California	IBis Recordings	Producer, drummer	
2015	Outside in the Present	Quadwrangle Music	Producer, drummer	

== Videos ==
2006 – Jazz Drums Hal Leonard Corporation|Hal Leonard

== Books ==
- ——— (1968). Sykes, Wanda (ed.). The Musician's Guide to Polyrhythms Vol. 1. Try Publishing. OCLC 473846740.
- ——— (1971). Sykes, Wanda (ed.). The Musician's Guide to Polyrhythms Vol. 2. Try Publishing. OCLC 69119928.
- ——— (1980). Learn to Play the Drumset (Book 1). Hal Leonard LLC. ISBN 978-0-7935-1199-0.
- ——— (1981). Learn to Play the Drumset (Book 2). Hal Leonard LLC. ISBN 978-0-7935-1200-3.
- ——— (1982). Music We Can See and Hear: A Music Book for Children, Their Parents, Teachers & Friends. Frederick Harris Music. ISBN 978-0-88797-162-4.
- ——— (1995). Polyrhythms for the Drumset. Belwyn Inc. ISBN 978-0-89724-821-1.
- ——— (1998). Complete Drumset Rudiments. Hal Leonard LLC. ISBN 978-0-7935-8372-0.
- ——— (2001) [1993]. Sykes, Wanda (ed.). Polyrhythms: The Musician's Guide. Hal Leonard LLC. ISBN 978-0-634-03283-7.
- ——— (2004) [1986]. Drummer's Guide to Music Theory. Hal Leonard LLC. ISBN 978-0-634-07842-2.
- ——— (2017). Learn to Play the Drumset – All-in-One Combo Pack. Hal Leonard LLC. ISBN 978-1-4950-8876-6.
