= David Rokeach =

American drummer

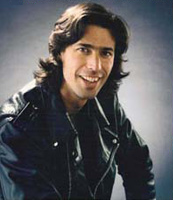
- Rokeach in 1999

Background information
- Genres: Jazz, rock, Latin, R&B, swing
- Occupation: Musician
- Instrument: Drums
- Years active: 1980s–present
- Website: www.davidrokeach.com

David Rokeach is an American drummer.

== Career ==
He has been working primarily in the San Francisco and Los Angeles areas for more than 30 years. Rokeach toured nationally and internationally with Ray Charles from 1990 to 1991. This included concert videos and many television appearances, including an appearance on The Tonight Show Starring Johnny Carson and the Doc Severinsen Orchestra. In recent years he has performed/recorded with Patti LaBelle, Aaron Neville, Mavis Staples, Lou Rawls, Dr. John, Joe Henderson, Mark Murphy, Charlie Musselwhite, The George Brooks-Zakir Hussain Group, Wilson Pickett, Linda Tillery, Steve Miller, Joe Satriani, Taj Mahal, Big Brother and the Holding Company, Joyce Cooling, Maria Muldaur, Calvin Keys, Barry Finnerty, Merl Saunders, David Grisman, Melvin Seals, The Rubinoos, The Family Stone Experience, Louis Bellson, Wayne Wallace, The Nelson Riddle Orchestra, The San Francisco Symphony, The Atlanta Symphony Orchestra, The Baltimore Symphony Orchestra, The Dallas Symphony Orchestra, Paula West, Marcos Silva, Alison Brown, Ernestine Anderson, Oscar Brown Jr., Ingrid Jensen, Maria Schneider, the composer and pianist Brian Kelly, plus Rita Moreno.

Starting in 1998, Rokeach played with Aretha Franklin. In addition to live concerts, this included television appearances on The Rosie O'Donnell Show, The View, Good Morning America, and VH1's Divas Live 1998, where he also performed with Mariah Carey, Celine Dion, Gloria Estefan, Shania Twain, and Carole King for the show's finale.

For the past few years, Rokeach has been working with Bay Area composer Joel Evans. Their recordings have appeared in numerous motion pictures and television shows, including Universal's For the Love of the Game, Paramount's What Women Want, Showtime's Seventeen Again, Fox's Say It Isn't So, The Young and the Restless, All My Children, Nash Bridges, The District, The X-Files, Sex and the City, Frasier, The Osbournes, Desperate Housewives, The West Wing, The O.C., LA Doctors, The Chris Isaak Show, among others.

Rokeach currently teaches at Stanford University, and has also been a faculty member at the Stanford Jazz Workshop and at the Rhythmic Concepts Jazz Camp West. Recently he played the Broadway shows Jersey Boys (with three different companies), Les Misérables, Ragtime, and the Janis Joplin show Love, Janis during their San Francisco runs. He has played the Broadway show It Ain't Nothin' but the Blues at Theaterworks in Palo Alto.
