= Vinson Valega =

American musician and composer

Vinson Valega (born March 12, 1965, in Silver Spring, Maryland) is a jazz musician, composer, media producer, and website designer who resides in New York City. He is also a nonprofit leader as the co-founder and Managing Director of the Institute for Sustained Creativity. Valega is also involved in environmental issues and progressive activism.

== Biography ==
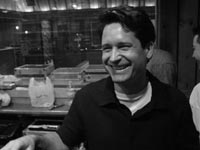
Vinson Valega

Valega grew up in a musical family in Olney, Maryland, studying classical piano from age seven until switching to the drums when he was 12. He played drums for three years in the All-County Jazz Ensemble during high school and subsequently held the drum chair in the University of Pennsylvania Big Band during college. After graduating from UPENN with a B.A. in Economics, Valega moved to New York City in the early 1990s to study music at the Mannes College of Music in Manhattan, where he studied with Marvin Smith (of The Tonight Show Band), Vernel Fournier, and Norm Freeman (of the New York Philharmonic).

Valega has performed in many clubs in the New York Metropolitan area, including the Blue Note, Smoke, The Jazz Gallery, 55 Bar, Birdland, Smalls, Cornelia Street Cafe, Cleopatra's Needle, and Trumpets of Montclair, NJ. A composer, Valega also teaches privately and served on the staff of the Stanford Jazz Workshop in California from 1999 to 2001. He has toured throughout North America and Europe with his groups and others, and he appears on Matthew Fries' CD, Song For Today (TCB) and the Ganz Brother's release, First Steps (Extravaganza).

Valega also has four recordings out as a leader, Biophilia (2009), Awake (2005), Consilience (2003), and Live@147 (2000), all released on the Consilience Productions label.

In addition, Valega has also worked with or played along with many of the great musicians in jazz, such as Grover Washington, Jr., Dakota Staton, Clarke Terry, James Williams, Donald Brown, Harold Mabern, Jr., Jamil Nasser, Ron McClure, Bob Mintzer, Russell Malone, Peter Bernstein, Mark Turner, Terell Stafford, Eric Alexander, Jim Rotundi, David Hazeltine, Joel Frahm, Dena DeRose, Vincent Herring, and Candido Camero, among others.

Since 1998, Valega has been married to artist Sharon Louden.

== Song samples ==
A Moment of Silence
from Biophilia, rec. June 2009.

Doesn't It Feel Great to Be Alive?
from Biophilia, rec. June 2009.

I Just Wanted to See What You Look Like
from Biophilia, rec. June 2009.

This is What Democracy Sounds Like
from Awake, rec. May 2005.

The Trend is Your Friend
from Awake, rec. May 2005.

Stumble Monk
from Consilience, rec. August 2002.

I Just Wanted to See What You Look Like
from Live@147, rec. July 1998.

All compositions by Vinson Valega
