= Black Benny =

American drummer (c.1890–1924)

- Born: Benjamin Williams c. 1890; New Orleans, Louisiana, U.S.
- Died: July 6, 1924 New Orleans, Louisiana, U.S.
- Genre: Jazz
- Occupation: Drummer
- Instrument: Bass drum
- Formerly of: Louis Armstrong, Sidney Bechet, Jelly Roll Morton

Benjamin "Benny" Williams (c. 1890 – 1924), better known as Black Benny, was a drummer from New Orleans.

Williams grew up in a rough poor African-American neighborhood in the Third Ward of New Orleans known as "The Battleground". He was in and out of jails for much of his life. In addition to his work as a drummer, Williams was a bouncer and a prizefighter.

An early colleague of Louis Armstrong, Williams is referred to in Armstrong's autobiography and helped look after Armstrong during his childhood. Sidney Bechet talks about Black Benny Williams in his autobiography, as does Jelly Roll Morton in his Library of Congress interviews.

Williams was stabbed in a dispute on July 2, 1924, by a woman named Helena Lewis. By the time he arrived at Charity Hospital that day, "he had lost a significant amount of blood. His heart was sliced open. And he had no pulse. Doctors went to work on him anyway." A surgeon used four stitches to sew up Williams' heart, then transfused a pint of blood from Williams' sister. Williams then woke up and began to talk. However, an infection set in. He developed pneumonia, and died on July 6. His assailant, Helena Lewis, was shot in an altercation with another woman later that same month. She died at Charity Hospital two weeks after Benny, on July 20.

== Sources ==
- Armstrong, Louis (1986). Satchmo: My Life in New Orleans. ISBN 978-0306802768.
- Bechet, Sidney, Treat it Gentle, Da Capo Press; 2nd ed. edition (March 5, 2002); ISBN 978-0306811081
