= Leon Anderson (musician) =

American jazz drummer

Leon Anderson is an American jazz drummer from New Orleans, Louisiana, US, who trained as a classical percussionist, and has worked with Marcus Roberts and Wynton Marsalis. He performs and tours internationally with Marsalis, Goines, Walter Payton and the Snapbean Band, and the Third Coast Jazz Quintet.

He has also performed with David Sanchez, Red Holloway, Donald Brown, Mike Wolf, Nathen Page, Allan Harris, Stephanie Nakasien, Phyllis Hyman, Barry Greene, Dianne Reeves, Harold Batiste, Donald Harrison, Mary Stallings, Judy Collins, Wessell Anderson, Wycliffe Gordon, Kent Jordan, Oliver Lake, James Moody, Deborah Brown, Rufus Reid, Henry Mancini, Art Farmer, Jason Marsalis, and The Temptations. Anderson is a professor and director of the Jazz Studies program at Florida State University.

== Professional recordings ==
- Victor Goines Joe’s Blues (1998)
- Victor Goines To Those We Love So Dearly (1999)
- Victor Goines Sunrise to Midnight (2000)
- Marcus Roberts Cole After Midnight Vol. I (1998)
- Five By Seign Club Swing (2001)
- Richie Summa Tear It Down (2001)
- Etienne Charles Culture Shock (2006)
- David Detweiler New York Stories (2009)
- Melvin Jones Pivot (2011)
- David Detweiler The Astoria Suite (2020)
