= Jazz drumming =

Art of playing percussion, predominantly the drum set, in jazz styles

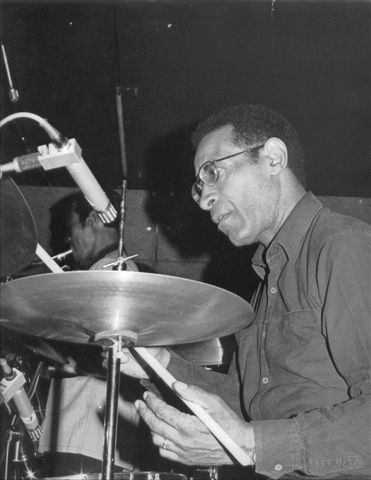
Max Roach (1924–2007), one of the pioneers of modern jazz drumming during the 1940s bebop era

Jazz drumming is the art of playing percussion (predominantly the drum kit, which includes a variety of drums and cymbals) in jazz styles ranging from 1910s-style Dixieland jazz to 1970s-era jazz fusion and 1980s-era Latin jazz. The techniques and instrumentation of this type of performance have evolved over several periods, influenced by jazz at large and the individual drummers within it. Stylistically, this aspect of performance was shaped by its starting place, New Orleans, as well as numerous other regions of the world, including other parts of the United States, the Caribbean, and Africa.

Jazz required a method of playing percussion different from traditional European styles, one that was easily adaptable to the different rhythms of the new genre, fostering the creation of jazz drumming's hybrid technique. As each period in the evolution of jazz—swing and bebop, for example—tended to have its own rhythmic style, jazz drumming continued to evolve along with the music through the 20th century. One tendency that emerged over time was the gradual "freeing" of the beat. But older styles persisted in later periods. The borders between these periods are unclear, partly because no one style completely replaced others, and partly because there were numerous cross influences between styles.

== Early history ==
=== Preliminary cultural mixing ===
The rhythms and use of percussion in jazz, as well as the art form itself, were products of extensive cultural mixing in various locations. The earliest occasion when this occurred was the Moorish invasion of Europe, where the cultures of France, Spain, and Africa to some extent, encountered each other and most likely exchanged some cultural information. The influence of African music and rhythms on the general mix that created jazz was profound, though this influence did not appear until later.

=== African influence ===
There are several central qualities shared by African music and jazz, most prominently the importance of improvisation. Some instrumental qualities from African music that appear in jazz (especially its drumming) include using unpitched instruments to produce specific musical tones or tone-like qualities, using all instruments to imitate the human voice, superimposition of one rhythmic structure onto another (e.g., a group of three against a group of two), dividing a regular section of time (called a measure in musical terms) into groups of two and three, and the use of repetitive rhythms used throughout a musical piece, often called clave rhythms. This last quality is one of special importance, as there are several pronounced occurrences of this pattern and the aesthetics that accompany it in the world of jazz.

==== Clave ====
African clave
The clave used most commonly in Africa, based on a feeling of three.

2-3 clave
A musician playing a 2-3 clave.

Clave is a tool for keeping time and determining which beats in a composition should be accented. In Africa, the clave is based on division of the measure into groups of three, on which only a few beats are emphasized. The Cuban clave, derived from the African version, is composed of two measures, one with three beats, one with two. The measures can be played in either order, with either the two or three beat phrase coming first, and are labeled "2-3" or "3-2", respectively.

Within the jazz band, phrases known as comping patterns have included elements of the clave since the very early days of the music. Comping is support of other musicians, often soloists, and echoing or reinforcement of the composition.

=== Cuban influence ===
The culture that created the most commonly used version of this pattern was that of Cuba. The circumstances that created that music and culture were very similar to those that created jazz; French, African, Spanish, and native Cuban cultures were all combined in Cuba and created many popular musical forms as well as the clave, which was a rather early invention. The music also affected the development of a variant of jazz, known as Latin jazz.

==== Latin jazz ====
Latin jazz is generally characterized by the use of even note combinations, as opposed to the swung notes common in most other varieties of jazz. It is also heavily influenced by the clave, and composers of the music require a knowledge of the workings of percussion in Afro-Cuban music—the instruments must combine with each other in a logical fashion. The specific genre of Afro-Cuban jazz is influenced by the traditional rhythms of Cuba, rather than from the entire Caribbean and other parts of the world.

== American influence ==
The military drumming of America, predominantly fife and drum corps, in the 19th century and earlier supplied much of the technique and instrumentation of the early jazz drummers. Influential players like Warren "Baby" Dodds and Zutty Singleton used the traditional military drumstick grip, military instruments, and played in the style of military drummers using rudiments, a group of short patterns which are standard in drumming. The rhythmic composition of this music was also important in early jazz and beyond. Very different from the African performance aesthetic, a flowing style which does not directly correspond to Western time signatures, the music played by military bands was rigidly within time and metric conventions, though it did have compositions in both duple and triple meter.

The equipment of the drummers in these groups was of particular significance in the development of early drum sets. Cymbals, bass, and snare drums were all used. Indeed, a method of damping a set of cymbals by crunching them together while playing bass drum simultaneously is probably how today's hi-hat, a major part of today's drum set, came about. Military technique and instrumentation were undoubtedly factors in the development of early jazz and its drumming, but the melodic and metric elements in jazz are more easily traced to the dance bands of the time period.

=== Dance bands ===
Black drummers were able to acquire their technical ability from fife and drum corps, but the application of these techniques in the dance bands of the 19th century allowed a more fertile ground for musical experimentation. Slaves learned traditional European dance music that they played at their masters' balls, most importantly a French dance called the quadrille, which had a particular influence on jazz and by extension jazz drumming. Musicians were also able to play dances that originated in Africa and the Caribbean in addition to the European repertoire. One such dance was the "congo". The performers of this novel music (to the predominantly white audience) created music for their own entertainment and uses as well.

=== Slave traditions ===
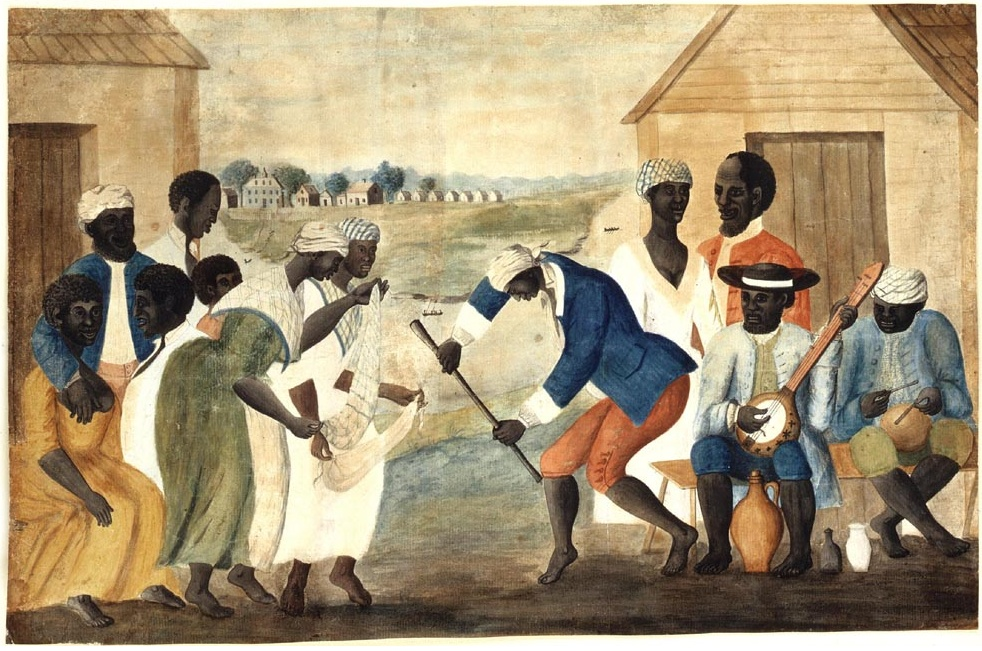
The Old Plantation (late 1700s), illustrating some slave traditions

Enslaved persons in America had many musical traditions that became important to the music of the country, particularly jazz. After work was done, these people would hold musical performances in which they played on pseudo-instruments made of washtubs and other objects newly used for musical purposes, and also played rhythms on their bodies, called "pattin' juba". The only area where enslaved persons were allowed to perform their music, other than private locations, was a place in New Orleans called Congo Square.

=== Congo Square and New Orleans ===
The former Africans were able to play their traditional music, which started to intermingle with the sounds of the many other cultures in New Orleans at the time: Haitian, European, Cuban, and American, as well as many other smaller denominations. They used drums almost indistinguishable from those made in Africa, though the rhythms were somewhat different from those of the songs of the regions the enslaved persons were from, probably the result of their having lived in America for several generations. A large number of musicians that played in Congo Square were from the Caribbean as well.

=== Blues ===
Shuffle pattern
The shuffle pattern, derived from the pattin' juba rhythm.

Another important influence to jazz was the blues, an expression of the hardships experienced daily by enslaved persons, in direct contrast to the work song, a celebration of work. Its musical inspiration came from where its players did, Africa. The rhythmic form of blues was a basis for many developments that would appear in jazz. Though its instrumentation was mostly limited to melodic instruments and a singer, feeling and rhythm were tremendously important. The two primary feels were a pulse on alternating beats that we see in countless other forms of American music, and the shuffle, which is essentially the pattin' juba rhythm, a feel based on a division of three rather than two.

=== Second line ===
One of the final influences on the development of early jazz, specifically its drumming and rhythms, was Second line drumming. The term "Second line" refers to the literal second line of musicians that would often congregate behind a marching band playing at a funeral march or Mardi Gras celebration. There were usually two main drummers in the second line: bass drum and snare drum players. The rhythms played were improvisatory in nature, but similarity between what was played at various occasions came essentially to a point of consistency, and early jazz drummers were able to integrate patterns from this style into their playing as well as elements from several other styles.

=== Ragtime ===
Before jazz came to prominence, drummers often played in a style known as ragtime, where an essential rhythmic quality of jazz first really began to be used: syncopation. Syncopation is synonymous with being "off-beat", and it is, among many things, a result of placing African rhythms written in odd combinations of notes (e.g., 3+3+2) into the evenly divided European metric concept. Ragtime was another style derived from black musicians playing European instruments, specifically the piano, but using African rhythms.

== Modern jazz drumming ==
=== Early technique and instrumentation ===
Jazz ride pattern
The ride pattern used most commonly today

Inverted ride pattern
The pattern that Warren "Baby" Dodds played

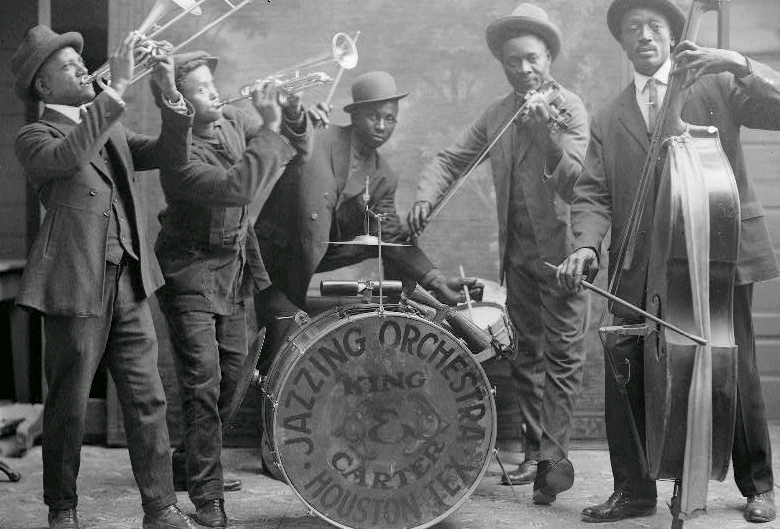
A drum set used in 1921 includes several accessories, including multiple cowbells.

The first true jazz drummers had a somewhat limited palette to draw on, despite their broad range of influence. Military rudiments and beats in the military style were essentially the only technique that they had at their disposal. However, it was necessary to adapt to the particular music being played, so new technique and greater musicianship evolved. The roll was the major technical device used, and one significant pattern was simply rolling on alternate beats. This was one of the first "ride patterns", a series of rhythms that eventually resulted in a beat that functions in jazz as the clave does in Cuban music: a "mental metronome" for the other members of the ensemble. Warren "Baby" Dodds, one of the most famous and important of the second generation of New Orleans jazz drummers, stressed the importance of drummers playing something different behind every chorus. His style was regarded as overly busy by some of the older generation of jazz musicians such as Bunk Johnson.

Beneath the constant rhythmic improvisation, Dodds played a pattern that was only somewhat more sophisticated than the basic one/three roll, but was, in fact, identical to the rhythm of today, only inverted. The rhythm was as follows: two "swung" eighth notes (the first and third notes of an eighth note triplet), a quarter note, and then a repeat of the first three beats (sound sample "Inverted ride pattern" at right). Aside from these patterns, a drummer from this time would have an extremely small role in the band as a whole. Drummers seldom soloed, as was the case with all other instruments in earliest jazz, which was based heavily on the ensemble. When they did, the resultant performance sounded more like a marching cadence than personal expression. Most other rhythmic ideas came from ragtime and its precursors, like the dotted eighth note series.

=== 1900s to 1940s ===
Image of Sonny Greer with his drum set, which included timpani among other accessories

The drummers and the rhythms they played served as accompaniment for dance bands, which played ragtime and various dances, with jazz coming later. It was common in these bands to have two drummers, one playing snare drum, the other bass. Eventually, however, due to various factors (not the least of which being the financial motivation), the number of drummers was reduced to one, and this created the need for a percussionist to play multiple instruments, hence the drum set. The first drum sets also began with military drums, though various other accessories were added later in order to create a larger range of sounds, and also for novelty appeal.

The most common of the accoutrements were the wood block, Chinese tom-toms (large, two-headed drums), cowbells, cymbals, and almost anything else the drummer could think of adding. The characteristic sound of this set-up could be described as "ricky-ticky": the noise of sticks hitting objects that have very little resonance. However, drummers, including Dodds, centralized much of their playing on the bass and snare drums. By the 1920s and '30s, the early era of jazz was ending, and swing drummers like Gene Krupa, Chick Webb, and Buddy Rich began to take the bases laid down by the early masters and experiment with them. It was not until a bit later, however, that the displays of technical virtuosity by these men were replaced by definite change in the underlying rhythmic structure and aesthetic of jazz, moving on to an era called bebop.

=== Bebop ===
To a small extent in the swing era, but most strongly in the bebop period, the role of the drummer evolved from an almost purely time-keeping position to that of a member of the interactive musical ensemble. Using the clearly defined ride pattern as a base, which was brought from the previous rough quality to the smooth, flowing rhythm we know today by "Papa" Jo Jones, as well as a standardized drum set, drummers were able to experiment with comping patterns and subtleties in their playing. One such innovator was Sidney "Big Sid" Catlett. His many contributions included comping with the bass drum, playing "on top of the beat" (imperceptibly speeding up), playing with the soloist instead of just accompanying him, playing solos of his own with many melodic and subtle qualities, and incorporating melodicism into all of his playing. Another influential drummer of bebop was Kenny Clarke, the man who switched the four beat pulse that had previously been played on the bass drum to the ride cymbal, effectively making it possible for comping to move forward in the future. Once again, this time in the late 1950s and most of the '60s, drummers began to change the entire basis of their art. Elvin Jones, in an interview with DownBeat magazine, described it as "a natural step".

=== 1950s and 1960s ===
During this time, the drummer took on an even more influential role in the jazz group at large, and started to free the drums into a more expressive instrument, allowing them to attain more equality and interactivity with the other parts of the ensemble. In bebop, comping and keeping time were two completely different requirements of the drummer, but afterward, the two became one entity. This newfound fluidity greatly extended the improvisatory capabilities that the drummer had. The feel in jazz drumming of this period was called "broken time", which gets its name from the idea of changing patterns and the quick, erratic, unconventional movements and rhythms.

Rhythm sections, in particular those of John Coltrane and Miles Davis, the former including Elvin Jones; the latter, Tony Williams, Philly Joe Jones, and Jimmy Cobb, were also exploring new metric and rhythmic possibilities. The concept of manipulating time, making the music appear to slow down or race ahead, was something that drummers had never attempted previously, but one that was evolving quickly in this era. Layering rhythms on top of each other (a polyrhythm) to create a different texture in the music, as well as using odd combinations of notes to change feeling, would never have been possible with the stiffness of drumming in the previous generation. Compositions from this new period required this greater element of participation and creativity on the part of the drummer.

Elvin Jones, a member of John Coltrane's quartet, developed a novel style based on a feeling of three partly due to the fact that Coltrane's pieces of the time were based on triple subdivision.

=== Free jazz ===
Throughout the history of jazz drumming, the beat and playing of the drummer have become progressively more fluid and "free", and in avant-garde and free jazz, this movement was largely fulfilled. A drummer named Sunny Murray is the primary architect of this new approach to drumming. Instead of playing a "beat", Murray sculpts his improvisation around the idea of a pulse, and plays with the "natural sounds that are in the instrument, and the pulsations that are in that sound". Murray also notes that his creation of this style was due to the need for a newer kind of drumming to use in the compositions of pianist Cecil Taylor.

=== Brushes ===
Drum brushes are sets of bristles, often made of metal or nylon, connected to a handle, forming a rounded fan shape. They are used predominantly by jazz drummers, but are used in other genres such as samba, to create a softer, sweeping sound on the drums and cymbals. Many jazz drummers effectively utilise brushes on the drums, some of these include Joe Morello and Art Blakey.

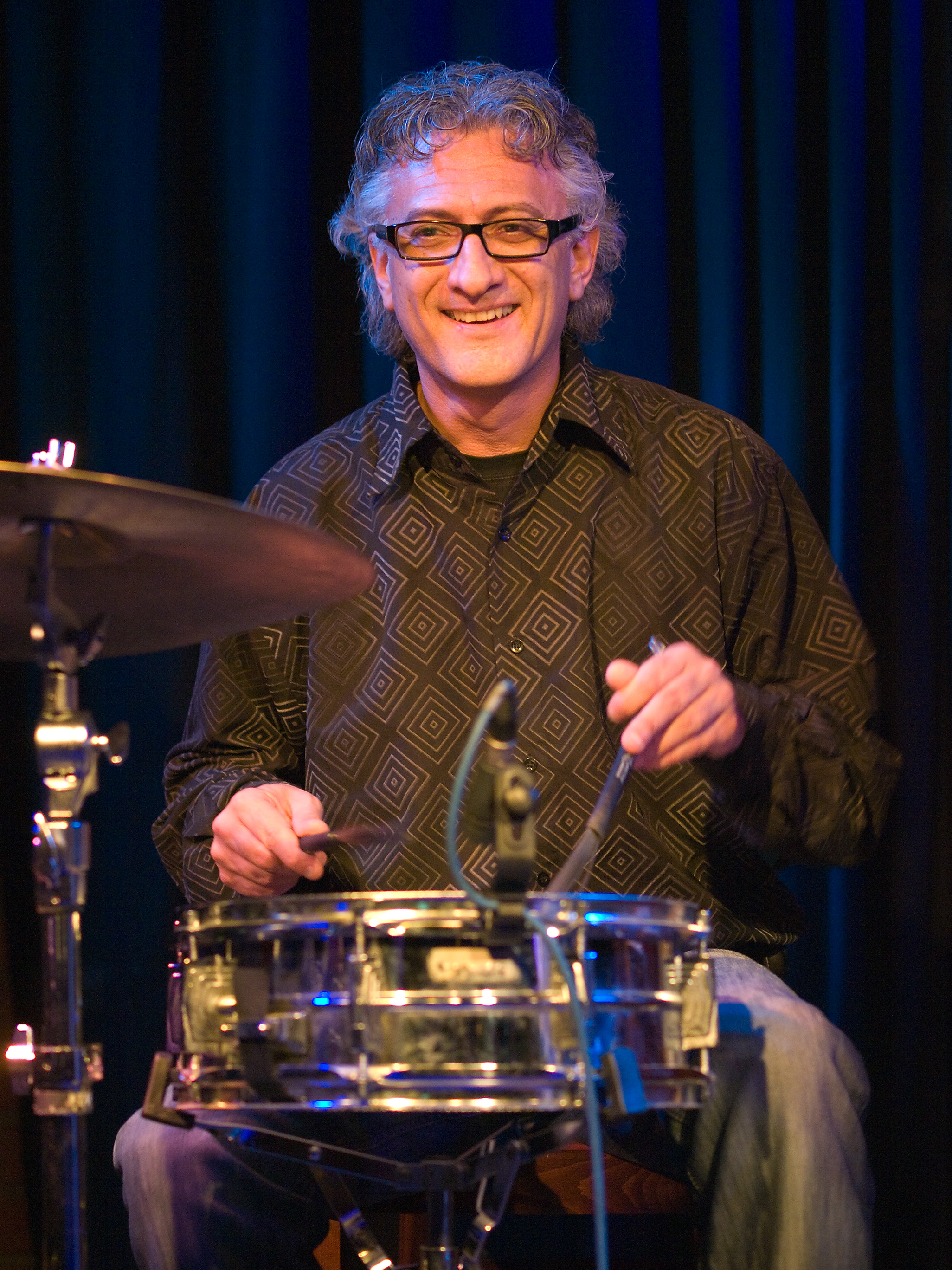
Heimo Wiederhofer Unterfahrt using brushes on the drums

In various styles of jazz, the more quiet, subdued sound of the brushes are used to contrast the bright, punchy sound of the sticks, usually at the beginning of a song. Often, a drummer will start a tune with the brushes. At their discretion, the drummer will switch to the sticks to give the piece a burst of energy. The moment at which the drummer switches from brushes to sticks is nuanced, usually with indication to the other bandmates. It almost always occurs at a moment of high energy entering the solo section, after the head. Sometimes, for the final chorus out of a song, the drummer will switch back to brushes one final time for a more conclusive ending.

Brushes are predominately played on the batter-head snare because when dragged over the grainy texture, the brushes have an appealing airy sound; however, the toms and cymbals are still used for accents and comping patterns. There are various techniques used depending on the sub-genre of the piece, all of which still typically have the hi-hat keeping time on beats two and four. During ballads, the brushes are played in a sweeping, circular motion creating an ambient texture for the slower tempo. In more up-beat, swing contexts, the brushes may play the typical ride pattern just shifted to the snare on their right hand, with the left hand reserved for comping. The back of typical jazz brushes have metal rings that are sometimes used on the cymbals for added texture.

== See also ==
- Beat
- List of jazz drummers
  - List of American jazz drummers
