= 1952 in jazz =

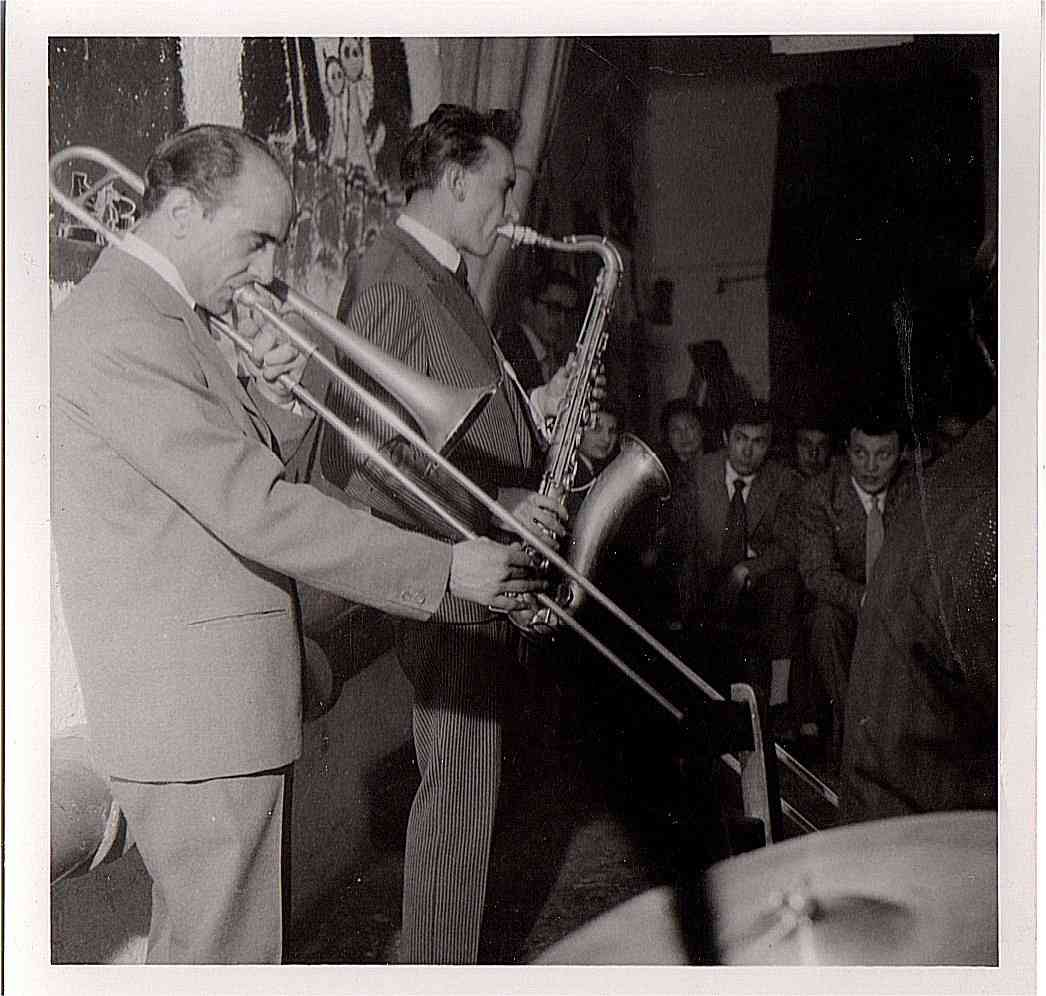
- Luciano La Neve, trombone, and Gigi Tognoli, saxophone during a jam session in Italy
- Decade: 1950s in jazz
- Music: 1952 in music
- Standards: List of post-1950 jazz standards
- See also: 1951 in jazz – 1953 in jazz

This is a timeline documenting events of Jazz in the year 1952.

== Events ==
- The pianist John Lewis initiates the Modern Jazz Quartet together with vibraphonist Milt Jackson, bassist Percy Heath, and drummer Kenny Clarke.
- Thelonious Monk starts making records for Prestige.
- The young trumpeter Chet Baker play with Charlie Parker before he joined the quartet of Gerry Mulligan.
- The health of guitarist Django Reinhardt is starting to fail. His fingers are getting stiff.
- Les Paul introduces his new invention, the solid body guitar, when Gibson begins marketing the classic guitar which bears his name.

== Album releases ==
- Gerry Mulligan: Gerry Mulligan Quartet Volume 1 (Pacific Jazz)
- Johnny Smith: Moonlight in Vermont originally Jazz at NBC Series (Royal Roost)
- Stan Kenton: New Concepts of Artistry in Rhythm (Capitol)
- Nat King Cole: Penthouse Serenade (Capitol)
- Duke Ellington: Ellington Uptown (Columbia)
- Charlie Parker and Dizzy Gillespie: Bird and Diz (Clef/Verve)
- Oscar Peterson: An Evening with Oscar Peterson (Clef Records)
- Oscar Peterson: Oscar Peterson Plays Duke Ellington (Clef Records)
- Dave Brubeck: The Dave Brubeck Quartet (Fantasy Records)
- Bud Powell: The Amazing Bud Powell (Blue Note)

== Deaths ==
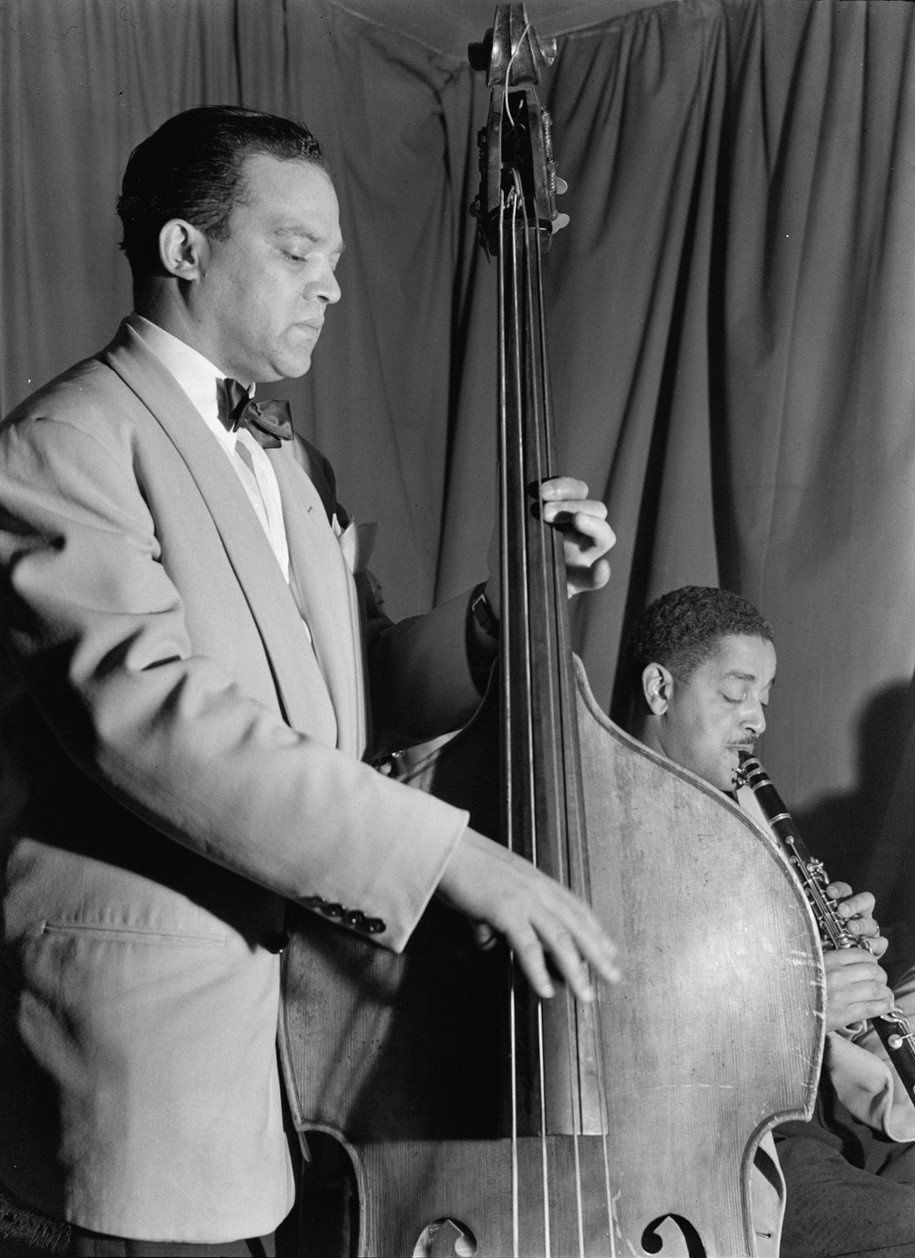
John Kirby and Buster Bailey, Washington D.C., May 1946

January

- 9 – Midge Williams, African-American singer (born 1915).

February

- 23 – Herb Morand, American trumpeter (born 1905).

March

- 27 – Cassino Simpson, American pianist (born 1909).

April

- 26 – Zinky Cohn, American pianist (born 1908).

June

- 14 – John Kirby, American upright bassist who also played trombone and tuba (born 1908).

November

- 20 – Mal Hallett, American jazz violinist and bandleader (born 1893).

December

- 29 – Fletcher Henderson, American pianist, bandleader, arranger and composer (born 1897).
- 31 – Mel Stitzel, German-born pianist best known for his work with the New Orleans Rhythm Kings (born 1902).

== Births ==
January

- 2 – Viatcheslav Nazarov, Russian trombonist, pianist, and vocalist (died 1996).
- 10 – William Parker, American bassist, poet, and composer.
- 11 – Lee Ritenour, American guitarist.
- 13 – Pekka Pohjola, Finnish multi-instrumentalist, composer, and producer (died 2008).
- 19 – Eric Leeds, American saxophonist.
- 27 – Ray Obiedo, American contemporary jazz guitarist.

February

- 18 – Randy Crawford, American singer.
- 20 – Uwe Kropinski, German guitarist.
- 22 – Ken Pickering, Canadian jazz promotor, Vancouver Jazz Festival co-founder (died 2018).

March

- 11 – Vince Giordano, American saxophonist, Nighthawks Orchestra.
- 17 – Manolo Badrena, Puerto Rican percussionist, Weather Report.
- 19 – Chris Brubeck, American bassist, bass trombonist, and pianist.
- 21 – Carlo Actis Dato, Italian saxophonist and composer.
- 22 – Bob Mover, American saxophonist and vocalist.
- 26 – Paolo Damiani, Italian cellist and upright bassist.
- 29 – Errol Dyers, South African guitarist and composer (died 2017).

April

- 2 – Dave Buxton, English pianist and composer.
- 6 – Richard Tabnik, American saxophonist.
- 8 – Yildiz Ibrahimova, Bulgarian singer of Turkish ancestry.
- 12 – Jeff Linsky, American guitarist.
- 16 – Jukka Tolonen, Finnish guitarist.
- 25 – Ketil Bjørnstad, Norwegian pianist, American composer and writer.
- 28 – Leni Stern, German guitarist, singer, and n'goni (Malian banjo-guitar) player.
- 29 – Dave Valentin, American flautist (died 2017).

May

- 2 – Mari Natsuki, Japanese singer.
- 8 – John Purcell, American saxophonist.
- 24
  - Dave DeFries, British trumpeter, flugelhornist, and percussionist.
  - Pierre Van Dormael, Belgian musician and composer (died 2008).
- 29 – Hilton Ruiz, American pianist (died 2006).

June

- 5 – Monnette Sudler, American guitarist.
- 7 – Royce Campbell, American guitarist.
- 12
  - Bent Patey, Norwegian guitarist, composer, and writer.
  - Jed Williams, Welsh jazz journalist and the founder of the Brecon Jazz Festival (died 2003).
- 13 – Clarence Banks, American trombonist, Count Basie Orchestra.
- 16 – Gino Vannelli, Canadian singer, songwriter, musician and composer.
- 19 – Sidsel Endresen, Norwegian vocalist, composer and actor.
- 20 – Gary Lucas, American guitarist, Gods and Monsters.
- 23 – Anthony Jackson, American bassist.
- 25 – Radka Toneff, Norwegian singer (died 1982).
- 28 – Alan Pasqua, American pianist.

July

- 1
  - Ichiko Hashimoto, Japanese pianist, composer and singer.
  - Leon "Ndugu" Chancler, American drummer (died 2018).
  - Timothy J. Tobias, American composer and pianist (died 2006).
- 7 – Sue Keller, American pianist and singer
- 23 – Janis Siegel, American singer.
- 26 – Christian Lauba, Tunisian born French composer and teacher.

August

- 11
  - Finn Sletten, Norwegian drummer.
  - Harry Tavitian, Romanian pianist and singer.
- 14 – George E. Lewis, American composer, electronic performer, installation artist, and trombonist.
- 19 – Bruce Katz, American pianist, organist, and bass guitarist.
- 20 – John Clayton, American upright bassist.
- 25
  - Ben Brown, American upright bassist.
  - Michael Marcus, American clarinetist and multi-woodwind player.
- 26
  - Michael Wolff, Austrian pianist, composer, and producer.
  - Peter Wolf, Austrian composer, producer, songwriter, and arranger.

September

- 1 – Ed Neumeister, American trombonist.
- 6 – Phil Markowitz, American pianist.
- 9 – Per Jørgensen, Norwegian trumpeter, vocalist, and multi-instrumentalist, JøKleBa.
- 19
  - Henry Kaiser, American guitarist and composer.
  - Uffe Markussen, Danish reedist.
- 22 – Oliver Mtukudzi, Zimbabwean guitarist (died 2019).
- 26 – Mark Dresser, American upright bassist and composer.
- 29 – Roy Campbell, Jr., American trumpeter (died 2014).

October

- 11 – Brian Jackson, American keyboardist, flautist, singer, composer, and producer.
- 16 – Ray Anderson, American trombonist and trumpeter.
- 21 – Ali Ryerson, American flautist.
- 27 – Ken Filiano, American upright bassist.
- 30 – Arlen Roth, American guitarist.

November

- 4 – Jeff Lorber, American keyboardist, composer, and record producer.
- 8 – Carl Haakon Waadeland, Norwegian drummer.
- 12 – Laurence Juber, English guitarist, Wings.
- 16 – Lauren Newton, American singer and composer.
- 28 – Ole Thomsen, Norwegian guitarist.
- 30 – Chris Joris, Belgian percussionist, pianist, and composer.

December

- 2 – Rob Mounsey, American keyboarder, composer, and arranger.
- 8
  - Mathias Rüegg, Swiss pianist, composer, bandleader, director, Vienna Art Orchestra.
  - Reynold Philipsek, American guitarist, singer-songwriter, and poet.
  - Ric Sanders, English violinist.
- 23 – Jay Azzolina, American guitarist, Spyro Gyra.
- 24 – Chucho Merchán, Colombian bassist and guitarist.
- 27 – David Knopfler, British singer-songwriter, guitarist, pianist, record producer, poet, and writer.
- 29 – Joe Lovano, American saxophonist, alto clarinetist, flautist, and drummer.

Unknown date

- Akio Sasajima, Japanese guitarist.
- Brad Upton, American trumpeter.
- Eugene Friesen, American cellist and composer.
- Gordon Johnson, American upright bassist.
- Roberto Perera, Uruguayan harpist.

== See also ==
- 1950s in jazz
- List of years in jazz
- 1952 in music

== Bibliography ==
- The New Real Book, Volume I. Sher Music. 1988. ISBN 0-9614701-4-3.
- The New Real Book, Volume II. Sher Music. 1991. ISBN 0-9614701-7-8.
- The New Real Book, Volume III. Sher Music. 1995. ISBN 1-883217-30-X.
- The Real Book, Volume I (6th ed.). Hal Leonard. 2004. ISBN 0-634-06038-4.
- The Real Book, Volume II (2nd ed.). Hal Leonard. 2007. ISBN 978-1-4234-2452-9.
- The Real Book, Volume III (2nd ed.). Hal Leonard. 2006. ISBN 0-634-06136-4.
- The Real Jazz Book. Warner Bros. ISBN 978-91-85041-36-7.
- The Real Vocal Book, Volume I. Hal Leonard. 2006. ISBN 0-634-06080-5.
