= Brad Upton =

Brad Upton may refer to:

- Brad Upton (musician)
- Brad Upton (comedian)
