= Renee Rosnes =

Canadian jazz pianist, composer, and arranger (born 1962)

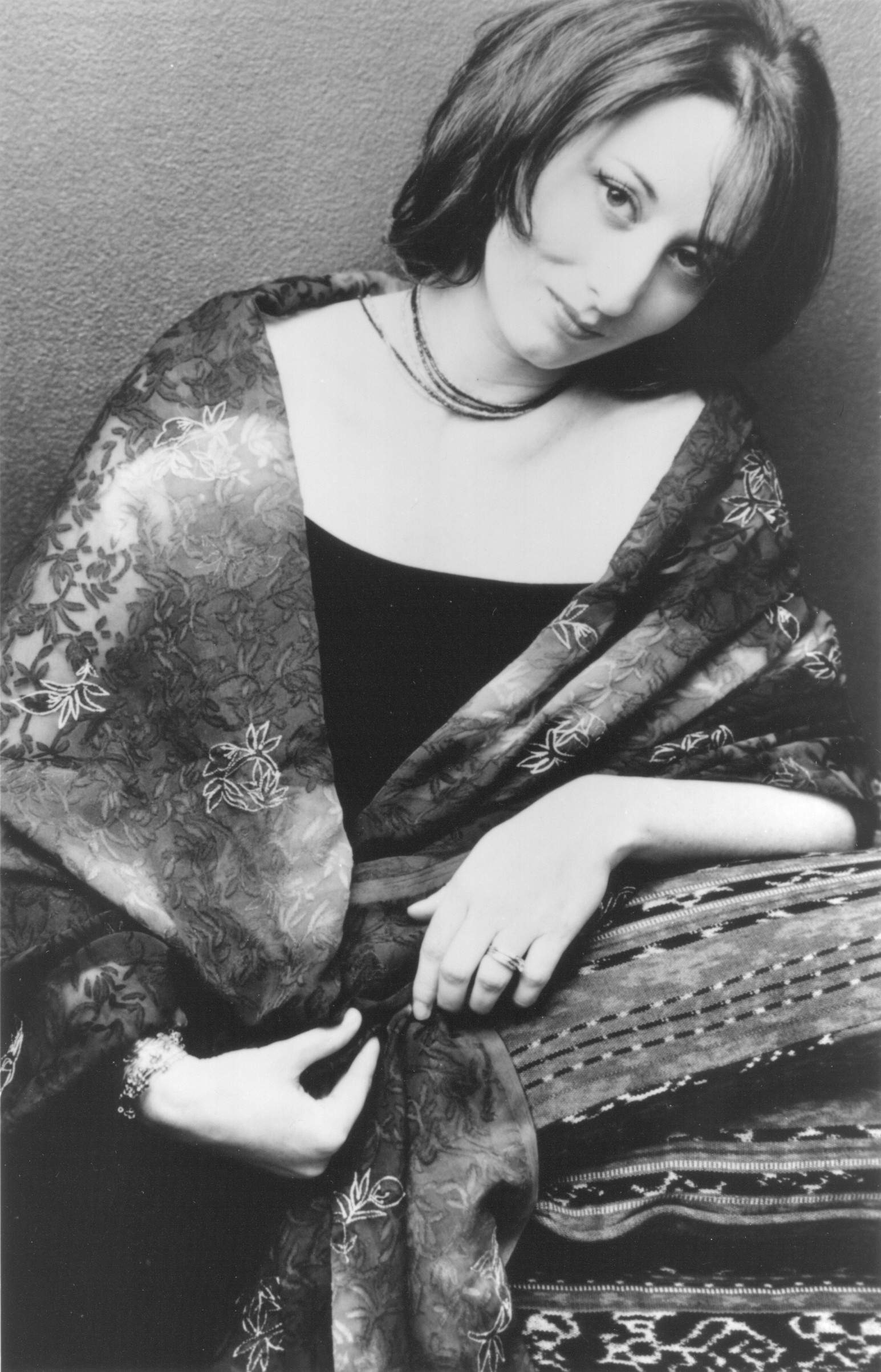

Background information
- Born: Irene Louise Rosnes; 24 March 1962 (age 64); Regina, Saskatchewan, Canada
- Genre: Jazz
- Occupations: pianist, composer, arranger
- Instrument: Piano
- Years active: c. 1985–present
- Labels: Blue Note, Smoke Sessions
- Member of: Artemis
- Website: reneerosnes.com

Irene Louise Rosnes (born 24 March 1962), known professionally as Renee Rosnes (/ˈriːni ˈrɒsnɛs/ REE-nee ROSS-ness), is a Canadian jazz pianist, composer, and arranger.

== Early life ==
Rosnes was born in Regina, Saskatchewan, to birth parents of Punjabi origin. She was subsequently adopted, and grew up in North Vancouver, British Columbia. She was three when she began taking classical piano lessons. She attended Handsworth Secondary School, and became interested in jazz music there, introduced to it by the school's band director, Bob Rebagliati.

She went on to the University of Toronto, and studied classical performance with pianist William Aide. In 1985, Rosnes was awarded a Canada Council for the Arts grant, and moved to New York City to continue her studies.

== Career ==
Shortly after arriving in New York, Rosnes became the pianist for the Blue Note Records label band, Out of the Blue, and recorded the 1989 album "Spiral Staircase" with the band. After tenor saxophonist Joe Henderson hired her to play with his quartet in 1986, Rosnes began an international career. In 1988, she was a member of the Wayne Shorter Band and in 1989, she joined trombonist J. J. Johnson's Quintet and remained his pianist of choice until he retired in 1997. In 1989, she also began working with tenor saxophonist James Moody and was the pianist in his quartet for the next 20 years. Rosnes frequently performed with vibraphonist Bobby Hutcherson, and recorded For Sentimental Reasons with his quartet in 2007. She was a founding member of the SFJAZZ Collective, and played with the octet from 2004 through 2009. Since 2011, she has been a member of bassist Ron Carter's Foursight Band, which tours frequently in Europe.

In 2023, Rosnes won her seventh Canadian Juno Award for Solo Jazz Album of the Year for Kinds of Love Smoke Sessions Records, recorded with Chris Potter on tenor, soprano saxes and flute, Christian McBride on bass, and Carl Allen on drums and Rogerio Boccato on percussion. She made four Japanese trio recordings for the VideoArts label with The Drummonds with ex-husband Billy Drummond and the unrelated Ray Drummond on bass. She married jazz pianist Bill Charlap on 25 August 2007, and the couple released a piano duet recording titled Double Portrait (Blue Note).

Rosnes was the host of Jazz Profiles, a CBC Radio show in which she profiled Canadian jazz musicians. Guests included pianists Paul Bley, Joe Sealy and Oliver Jones, bassists Don Thompson and Michel Donato, trumpeters Guido Basso and Kenny Wheeler, and drummer Terry Clarke. With producer Kelly Peterson Rosnes is a co-founder of the Canadian Jazz Master Awards and was the artistic director of the Oscar Peterson International Jazz Festival, which took place in Ontario, Canada. Rosnes is the founder, pianist and musical director of the all-female quintet Artemis. The other members are Ingrid Jensen (trumpet), Nicole Glover (tenor sax), Noriko Ueda (bass), Allison Miller (drums). The group signed with the Blue Note label, and their eponymously titled debut album was released on 11 September 2020. Artemis has been voted Jazz Group of the Year for three consecutive years by Downbeat magazine’s Annual Readers Poll (2023-2025) and was awarded Mid-Size Ensemble of the Year in 2024 and 2025 by the Jazz Journalists Association.

== Awards and honours ==
- Hugh Fraser (musician)'s tribute composition Irenerosnesity was recorded by The Hugh Fraser Quintet on their album Looking Up (CBC Records 1988) and performed by them at the Montreal Jazz Festival (1988)
- Juno Awards, Best Jazz Album, For the Moment (1992), Ancestors (1997), Life on Earth (2003), Written in the Rocks (2017), Kinds of Love, (2023)
- Juno Awards, Best Mainstream Jazz Album, Free Trade (1995)
- Juno nominations, Best Mainstream Jazz Album, As We Are Now (1998), Deep Cove (2005) (Ryga/Rosnes),
- Juno nominations, Best Jazz Album, Renee Rosnes (1991), Art and Soul (2000), Beloved of the Sky (2018)
- SOCAN Composer of the Year, 2003
- Western Canadian Music Awards, Jazz Recording of the Year, Deep Cove by Ryga-Rosnes Quartet, (2005)
- Sikh Centennial Gala Award, Sikh Foundation of Canada, 2015
- Newark School of the Arts, Artistic Honoree, 2016
- Oscar Peterson Award, Festival International de Jazz de Montréal, 2018

== Discography ==
=== As leader/co-leader ===
- Face to Face (Somethin' Else, 1989)
- Renee Rosnes (Blue Note, 1990) – includes live rec. 1988
- For the Moment (Blue Note, 1990)
- Without Words with String Orchestra (Blue Note, 1992)
- Ancestors (Blue Note, 1996)
- As We Are Now (Blue Note, 1997)
- Art & Soul (Blue Note, 1999)
- With a Little Help from My Friends (Blue Note, 2001)
- Life on Earth (Blue Note, 2001)
- Renee Rosnes and the Danish Radio Big Band with DR Big Band (Blue Note, 2003) – rec. 2001
- Deep Cove (CBC, 2004)
- A Time for Love (Video Arts, 2005)
- Black Narcissus: A Tribute to Joe Henderson (Pony Canyon/M&I, 2009)
- Double Portrait with Bill Charlap (Blue Note, 2010) – rec. 2009
- Manhattan Rain (Pony Canyon, 2012)
- Written in the Rocks (Smoke Sessions, 2016) – rec. 2015
- Beloved of the Sky (Smoke Sessions, 2018)
- Ice on the Hudson: Songs by Renee Rosnes & David Hajdu with David Hajdu (SMK, 2018)
- Kinds of Love (Smoke Sessions, 2021)

=== As a member ===
Out of the Blue

- Spiral Staircase (Blue Note, 1989)

Superblue

- Superblue 2 (Blue Note, 1989)

Free Trade
With Neil Swainson, Peter Leitch, Ralph Bowen and Terry Clarke

- Free Trade (Justin Time, 1994)

Carnegie Hall Jazz Band

- The Carnegie Hall Jazz Band/Music Director Jon Faddis (Blue Note, 1996)

The Drummonds
With Ray Drummond and Billy Drummond

- When You Wish Upon a Star (VideoArts, 1999)
- Letter to Evans (VideoArts, 2000)
- A Beautiful Friendship (VideoArts, 2002)
- Pas de Trois (True Life Jazz, 2002)
- Once Upon a Summertime (VideoArts, 2003)

SFJAZZ Collective

- Inaugural Season Live 2004 (SFJAZZ, 2004)[3CD]
- Live 2005: 2nd Annual Concert Tour – The Works of John Coltrane (SFJAZZ, 2005)[2CD]
- Live 2006: 3rd Annual Concert Tour – The Music of Herbie Hancock (SFJAZZ, 2006)[2CD]
- Live 2007: 4th Annual Concert Tour – The Works of Thelonious Monk (SFJAZZ, 2007)[2CD]
- Live 2008: 5th Annual Concert Tour – The Works of Wayne Shorter (SFJAZZ, 2008)[3CD]
- Live 2009: 6th Annual Concert Tour – The Music of McCoy Tyner (SFJAZZ, 2009)[2CD]

Artemis

- Artemis (Blue Note, 2020)
- Artemis: In Real Time (Blue Note, 2023)
- Artemis: Arboresque (Blue Note, 2025)

=== As sideperson ===
With Ron Carter

- Brasil L.I.K.E. with Vitoria Maldonado (Summit, 2016)
- Foursight Quartet: Live in Stockholm, Vol. 1 (In and Out, 2019)
- Foursight Quartet: Live in Stockholm, Vol. 2 (In and Out, 2020)

With Todd Coolman

- Tomorrows (BRC, 1991)
- Lexicon (Double-Time, 1995) – rec. 1991

With Michael Dease

- Coming Home (D Clef, 2013)
- All These Hands (Posi-Tone, 2016)
- Never More Here (Posi-Tone, 2019)

With Billy Drummond

- Native Colours, (Criss Cross, 1992) – rec. 1991
- The Gift (Criss Cross, 1994) – rec. 1993

With Jon Faddis

- Into the Faddisphere (Epic, 1989)
- Hornucopia (Epic, 1991)

With Jimmy Greene

- Beautiful Life (Mack Avenue, 2014)
- Flowers, Beautiful Life, Volume 2 (Mack Avenue, 2017)

With Joe Henderson

- Punjab (Arco, 1990) – rec. 1986
- Humpty Dumpty with Akio Sasajima (BRC, 1990) – rec. 1988

With J. J. Johnson

- Let's Hang Out (Verve, 1993)
- The Brass Orchestra (Verve, 1997)
- Heroes (Verve, 1998)

With Marian McPartland

- Just Friends (Concord, 1998)
- An NPR Christmas Collection with Marian McPartland and Friends (NPR, 2006)[3CD]

With Jimmy Scott

- But Beautiful (Milestone, 2002) – rec. 2001
- Moon Glow (Milestone, 2003) – rec. 2000–2001

With Gary Thomas

- The Seventh Quadrant (Enja, 1987)
- While the Gate Is Open (JMT, 1990)

With Walt Weiskopf

- Anytown (Criss Cross, 1999) – rec. 1998
- Quartet Live (Capri, 2011) – rec. 2008

With Gerald Wilson

- New York, New Sound (Mack Avenue, 2003)
- In My Time (Mack Avenue, 2005)
- Monterey Moods (Mack Avenue, 2007)
- Detroit (Mack Avenue, 2009)
- Legacy (Mack Avenue, 2011)

With Dave Young

- Two by Two, Vol. 1 (Justin Time, 1995)
- Two by Two, Vol. 2 (Justin Time, 1996)
- One Way Up (Modica Music, 2016)
- Lotus Blossom (Modica Music, 2019)

With others

- Howard Alden, Take Your Pick (Concord, 1997)
- Tony Bennett & Bill Charlap, The Silver Lining: The Songs of Jerome Kern (RPM/Columbia, 2015) – Grammy won album
- Adrian Cunningham and Ken Peplowski, Duologue (Arbors, 2018)
- Steve Davis, We See (Smoke Sessions, 2024)
- Brandi Disterheft, Gratitude (Justin Time, 2012)
- Ray Drummond, Vignettes (Arabesque, 1996)
- Robin Eubanks, Karma (JMT, 1991)
- Nick Finzer, Legacy: A Centennial Celebration of JJ Johnson (Outside in Music, 2024)
- Renée Fleming, Christmas in New York (Decca, 2014)
- Sonny Fortune, Invitation (Century, 2010)
- Dizzy Gillespie All-Star Big Band, Things to Come (MCG Jazz, 2002)
- David Hajdu, Waiting for the Angel (Miranda, 2015)
- Slide Hampton, Inclusion (Twin, 1999)
- Vincent Herring, Secret Love (MusicMasters, 1993)
- Bobby Hutcherson, For Sentimental Reasons (Kind of Blue, 2007)
- John LaBarbera Big Band, Grooveyard (Origin, 2023)
- Joyce Moreno, Astronauta – The Songs of Elis (Blue Jackel, 1998)
- Steve Kaldestad, New York Afternoon (Cellar Jazz, 2015)
- Tom Kennedy, Just Play (Capri, 2013)
- Peter Leitch, Blues on the Corner (Reservoir, 1999)
- Joe Magnarelli, Why Not (Criss Cross, 1995)
- George Mraz, Duke's Place (Milestone, 1999)
- Mike Murley, Taking Flight (Cornerstone, 2020)
- Lewis Nash, Highest Mountain (Cellar Live, 2011)
- Native Colors, One World (Concord, 1995)
- Greg Osby, Season of Renewal (JMT, 1990)
- Niels-Henning Ørsted Pedersen, Friends Forever (Milestone, 1997)
- Rich Perry, So in Love (Steeplechase, 1998)
- Jim Snidero, Strings (Milestone, 2003)
- Neil Swainson "Fire in the West" (Cellar Music Group, 2022)
- Steve Turre, One4J (Telarc, 2003)
- Chip White, Personal Dedications & Percussive Tributes (Dark Colors, 2011)
- Nancy Wilson, A Nancy Wilson Christmas (Telarc, 2001)
- Pete Yellin, How Long Has This Been Going On? (Jazzed Media, 2009)
- Libby York, Sunday in New York (Blujazz Productions, 2004)
