= Spencer Day =

American singer-songwriter (born 1978)

- Born: June 28, 1978 (age 48)
- Genres: Jazz pop, smooth jazz, swing
- Occupations: Musician, singer-songwriter
- Instruments: Vocals, piano
- Years active: 2004–present

Spencer Day (born June 28, 1978) is a modern jazz singer and songwriter best known for his hit Jazz single "Till You Come to Me" as well as appearing on the CBS television network show Star Search in 2002–2003.

He has released six studio albums to date. His latest album Broadway By Day, funded through a PayPal crowdfunding campaign and originally set for a late 2019 release, will be released in Fall 2021.

== Early life ==
Spencer Day was born on June 28, 1978, in a small town in Utah. Growing up, Day said, his mother wanted to get him involved in singing, but he was not interested. Following his parents' separation, he lived with his grandparents in Arizona. After working at a gas station, he moved to California. When he was 20, his roommate heard him singing in the shower and suggested he take lessons. Day took the advice, and he began studying piano seriously. Mostly self-taught, Day sang and played piano at bars and retirement homes, typically playing jazz standards.

== Career ==
=== Star Search, debut album, and Movie of Your Life ===
In 2002, he auditioned and was selected to compete on the CBS television network show Star Search. Day soon made it to the semi-finals against singers Ugochi Nwaogwugwu and Nikki Kimbrough for the Adult Singer category, eventually moving onto the finals against Adult Singer Jake Simpson, Junior Singers Tiffany Evans and Lisa Tucker, Comedians Loni Love and John Roy, and Models Porschla Coleman and Candace Campfield. Following the show, his cover of "What a Wonderful World" was released as a single alongside Tiffany Evans's "There's a Winner in You." In 2004, he released his debut album Introducing Spencer Day, which featured his love of jazz standards.

His second album Movie of Your Life the following year featured his own songs and the title track won San Francisco Academy of Art University's 2005 competition for best original song. Dolby Laboratories chose the video version of the song for use in its global launch of the Dolby 7.1 system. The same year, he collaborated with improvisation actor Rafe Chase on a 20-song musical revue, Someday, Love, which premiered at San Francisco's New Conservatory Theatre Center. In addition to writing the score, Day also starred in the show.

Day performed at the 2007 San Francisco Jazz Festival, and has been a recurring headliner in a number of high-profile Bay Area clubs, including Yoshi's, Plush Room, Great American Music Hall and the Herbst Theatre. On the opposite coast, he has earned raves for performances at the Town Hall, Joe's Pub and the Canal Room in New York City, and the Kennedy Center in Washington, DC. He has also appeared at both the Monterey Jazz Festival and the Tanglewood Jazz Festival.

In March 2008, Day opened for Rufus Wainwright at the Napa Valley Opera House.

He appeared at the Tanglewood Jazz Festival in the summer of 2008. Of Day's Tanglewood performance of Mel Tormé's "Born to be Blue" with Marian McPartland on piano, NPR's David Lyon said he "can croon with the best of them." The Village Voice described Day in 2010 as "a prodigious singing/songwriting and piano-plunking talent." The Mercury News said: "Day uses intuition and improvisation as his primary tools to craft a sound that is traditional and familiar, yet fresh and innovative at the same time, creating a blend too subtle to parse into neatly defined categories," and described him as "a balladeer for the new century".

=== Vagabond and "Till You Come to Me" ===
Whereas his first two albums were largely self-distributed, Day's third album, Vagabond in 2009, was co-produced by Spencer and Ben Yonas for Concord Jazz. The album peaked at No. 11 on Billboard's Jazz Albums Chart and stayed in the charts for 47 weeks.

It featured his single "Till You Come to Me" which he performed on The Late Late Show with Craig Ferguson on September 8, 2009. The single ending up peaking at No. 3 on its Jazz Charts on May 1, 2010. The Smooth Jazz Top 20 Countdown ranked "Til You Come to Me" the No. 1 cut for 2010, the first time a vocalist earned that honor.

The song was broadcast often on Easy Listening stations such as New York City's 106.7 Lite FM (WLTW). His "Vagabond" tour took him from coast to coast with a few performances in England and Japan. The song "Joe" on the album is semi-autobiographical and reflects his growing up.

=== The Mystery of You, Daybreak to present ===
Following the success of his third album, Day spent some time reflecting and soon was ready to release a new album in 2013. His fourth album The Mystery of You was released on March 12, 2013 on Concord Records. Featuring newer influences that ranged from smoky noir to Latin jazz to surf guitar to Middle Eastern and Asian melodies, the album marked a growth in Day's career. The following year, he released his fifth studio album Daybreak.

In 2015, he started an Indiegogo campaign for his sixth studio album Angel City, which successfully met its goal in December. Since then, he performed and completed the album, which was released in 2018. The set's first single "72 and Sunny" garnered critical praise and peaked at number 27 on Billboard's Adult Contemporary chart. He is currently working on rolling out his latest album, Broadway By Day, featuring "the unlikely friendship between jazz and musical theatre." The album is set for a Fall 2021 release.

== Influences ==
He grew up listening to a wide cross-section of composers, including Cole Porter, George Gershwin, Joni Mitchell, John Lennon and Paul Simon. And the classic MGM musicals in the local theater – the only options available in his hometown – eventually left their mark on his creative sensibilities.

His track "The Answer" pays homage to Roy Orbison, a longtime favorite of Day.

Responding to an interviewer's request to describe his musical influences and styles, he said: "Chet Baker meets Paul Simon."

== Personal life ==
In a March 2010 interview, Day discussed how he came out as gay to his family and how Rufus Wainwright and k.d. lang have helped to minimize the impact of his coming out on his career and avoid having his music labeled with his sexuality: "What I do, the causes I'm behind, that's what's important. Who I am, unless it is particularly relevant, has no place in my music." In May 2010, Day discussed his homosexuality and said: "I wanted to stand and be counted....I was born in Utah and I grew up Mormon and I want to be part of building a bridge between the LGBT community and the Mormon community."

== Activism ==
Day's charitable activities have included performances on behalf of Catholic Charities' support for HIV/AIDS, the Horizons Foundation, a community-based LGBT philanthropic organization, the children's health charity ONEXONE, and the Human Rights Campaign's Salt Lake City fund-raising dinner.

On June 30, 2010, Day rang NASDAQ's closing bell in recognition of his donation of earnings from downloads of his single "Better Way" to Feeding America.

== See also ==
- LGBTQ representation in jazz

== Discography ==
=== Albums ===
- Introducing Spencer Day (2004)
- Vagabond (2009) – No. 11 Jazz Albums
- The Mystery of You (2013) – No. 13 Jazz Albums, No. 39 Heatseekers
- Daybreak (2014) – No. 20 Jazz Albums
- Angel City (2018)
- Broadway by Day (2022)

=== EPs ===
- Movie of Your Life (2005)
- If Christmas Doesn't Kill Me (2012)

=== Singles ===
- "What a Wonderful World" (2003)
- "Movie of Your Life" (2005)
- "Till You Come to Me" (2009)
- "Better Way" (2009)
- "The Mystery of You" (2013)
- "Here I Go" (2013)
- "Something Wicked" (2013)
- "Missing Tonight" (2014)
- "Christmas with You" (featuring The Joel Evans Big Band) (2014)
- "72 and Sunny" (2018)
- "Angel City" (2018)
- "I Don't Know How To Love Him" (2022)
- "Bali Ha'i" (2022)
