= Oscar Peterson International Jazz Festival =

Jazz festival in Ontario

The Oscar Peterson International Jazz Festival (OPIJF) was co-founded in 2018 by Kelly Peterson, widow of the Canadian jazz musician Oscar Peterson, and jazz pianist Renee Rosnes. The festival's mission is to showcase world-class Canadian talent performing alongside premier international jazz artists. The inaugural festival was dedicated to jazz impresario Norman Granz on the 100th anniversary of his birth. During the annual festival, which took place in Niagara-on-the-Lake, Ontario in 2018 and 2019, the Canadian Jazz Masters Awards were also presented.

== 2018 line-up ==
Cécile McLorin Salvant, Jon Faddis, Jimmy Greene, Michael Dease, Benny Green, Christian McBride, Kenny Washington (musician) / Bill Charlap and Renee Rosnes Duo / Mike Murley, Kevin Turcotte, Carol Welsman, Robi Botos, Dave Young (bassist), Jim Doxas.

== 2019 line-up ==
The Christine Jensen Jazz Orchestra with Ingrid Jensen, Tara Davidson, Allison Au, Joel Miller, Perry White, Brian O'Kane, Jason Logue, Lena Allemano, Rebecca Hennessy, William Carn, Kelsley Grant, Terry Promane, Christian Overton, Gary Versace, Lorne Lofsky, Jon Maharaj, Jon Wikan / Bill Charlap Lecture and Solo Performance / Joe Lovano, Jeremy Pelt, Niki Haris, Russell Malone, Renee Rosnes, Peter Washington, Lewis Nash / Kenny Barron, Kirk MacDonald (musician), Reg Schwager, Neil Swainson, Lewis Nash.
