= Sasajima =

Sasajima (written: 笹島) is a Japanese surname. Notable people with the surname include:

- Akio Sasajima (笹島 明夫) (born 1952), Japanese jazz guitarist
- Kahoru Sasajima (笹島 かほる) (born 1973), Japanese voice actress
