= Art & Soul =

Studio album by Renee Rosnes
- Released: August 31, 1999
- Recorded: February 16–18, 1999
- Studios: BearTracks Recording Studio, Suffern, NY
- Genre: Jazz
- Length: 58:27
- Label: Blue Note
- Producer: Renee Rosnes

Renee Rosnes chronology
As We Are Now (1997)	Art & Soul (1999)	Life on Earth (2001)

Art & Soul is an album by pianist Renee Rosnes which was recorded in 1999 and released on the Blue Note label.

== Reception ==
Professional ratings
Review scores
Source	Rating
AllMusic	4.5/5 stars
The Penguin Guide to Jazz Recordings	4/4 stars

The AllMusic review by Ken Dryden stated "Renee Rosnes' sixth Blue Note CD shows her stretching well past her hard bop roots ... Highly recommended". On All About Jazz, David Adler noted "Whereas previous outings have stressed Rosnes’s own compositions, this disc contains only two originals—and they happen to be my two favorite cuts".

== Track listing ==
All compositions by Renee Rosnes except where noted

1. "Blues Connotation" (Ornette Coleman) – 6:25
2. "With a Little Help from My Friends" (John Lennon, Paul McCartney) – 6:18
3. "Goodbye" (Gordon Jenkins) – 5:36
4. "Ancient Footprints" (Wayne Shorter, Kitty Margolis) – 8:24
5. "Fleurette Africaine" (Duke Ellington) – 6:23
6. "Romp" – 5:40
7. "Lazy Afternoon" (Jerome Moross, John La Touche) – 5:12
8. "Little Spirit" – 5:17
9. "Sanfona" (Egberto Gismonti) – 3:48
10. "Children's Song, No. 3" (Béla Bartók) – 5:20

== Personnel ==
- Renee Rosnes – piano
- Scott Colley – bass
- Billy Drummond – drums
- Richard Bona – percussion (tracks 4–5)
- Dianne Reeves – vocals (tracks 4 & 7)
