= For the Moment =

For the Moment may refer to:

- For the Moment (film), a 1993 film
- For the Moment (Barry Harris album), 1985
- For the Moment (Renee Rosnes album), 1990
- "For the Moment" (Every Little Thing song), 1997
- "For the Moment" (Chris Brown song), 2026
- For the Moment, a 2004 album by Wheesung
- For the Moment, a 2005 album by David Rovics
- For the Moment, a 2012 album by Bob Mintzer
