= Allison Miller (drummer) =

American jazz drummer, composer and bandleader

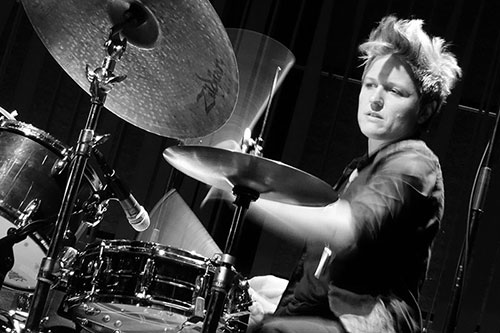
- Miller performing in 2015

Background information
- Origin: New York City
- Genres: jazz, folk, rock, pop
- Years active: 1999–present
- Website: allisonmiller.com

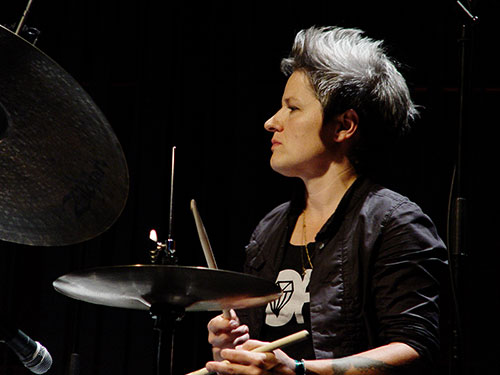
Miller at Reykjavík Jazz Festival, Iceland 2015

Allison Miller (born 1974 or 1975) is an American, New York City-based drummer, composer, and teacher.

== Early life ==
Miller is descended from a long line of musicians on the maternal side of her family. Her grandmother was a professional organist in Oklahoma, whose sister was a professional singer. Her mother is a classical pianist and choral director. Miller has a cousin who she described as "a very famous opera singer".

Miller was raised in the Washington, D.C. area, and began playing drums at the age of 10, studying with Walter Salb. She attended West Virginia University.

== Career ==
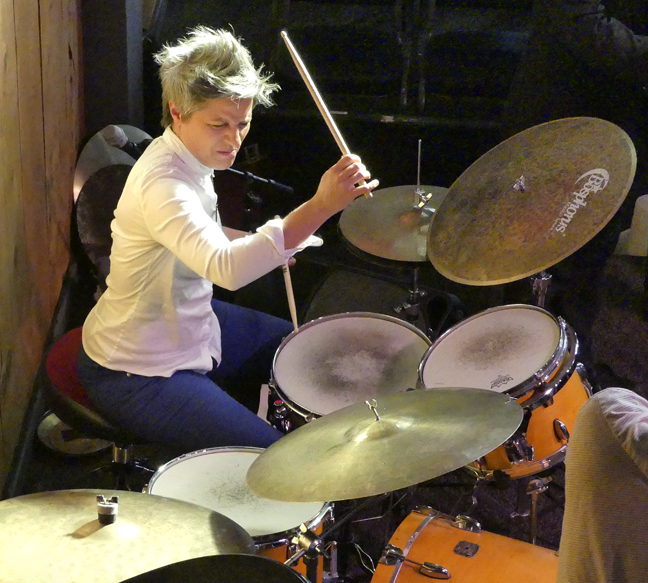
Miller at Bach Dancing & Dynamite Society, Half Moon Bay, California, April 2016

5 years after graduating from West Virginia University, she moved to New York City to study with Michael Carvin and Lenny White, and began her career as a freelance drummer. Because of this, she's earned gigs with artists like Ani DiFranco, Brandi Carlile, and more. She has also worked as a producer, composer, and teacher.

She has recorded six albums as a leader: 5 AM Stroll, Boom Tic Boom, No Morphine-No Lilies, Live at Willisau, Otis Was a Polar Bear, and Glitter Wolf as well as working as a session musician. Her work with bands have included Honey Ear Trio with Rene Hart and Erik Lawrence, Holler and Bam with Toshi Reagon, and her own band, Allison Miller's Boom Tic Boom, composed of Todd Sickafoose, Marty Ehrlich, and Dan Tepfer.

Miller has performed with songwriting vocalists Ani DiFranco, Natalie Merchant, and Erin McKeown, and toured with avant-garde saxophonist Marty Ehrlich, organist Dr Lonnie Smith and folk-rock singer Brandi Carlile.

Some of Miller's music has been featured in Showtime series, "The L Word". She is also a three-time Jazz Ambassador for the United States State Department, having traveled to East Africa, Eurasia, and Southeast Asia.

== Personal life ==
Miller is a lesbian. In 2013, she contributed an essay to The Huffington Post describing her coming out process and her experiences as a female, lesbian, and feminist in the male-dominated jazz world.

== Discography ==
- 5am Stroll (Foxhaven Records) (2005)
- At The End of The Day, Agrazing Maze (Foxhaven Records) 2006
- Boom Tic Boom (Foxhaven Records) (2010)
- Boom Tic Boom: Live at Wilisau (Foxhaven Records) (2012)
- No Morphine No Lilies featuring Boom Tic Boom (The Royal Potato Family) (2013)
- Otis Was a Polar Bear featuring Boom Tic Boom (The Royal Potato Family) (2016)
- Science Fair with Carmen Staaf (Sunnyside Records) (2018)
- Glitter Wolf featuring Boom Tic Boom (The Royal Potato Family) (2019)
- Rivers in Our Veins (The Royal Potato Family) (2023)

== Other projects ==
- Steampunk Serenade - Honey Ear Trio (Miller, Rene Hart, Erik Lawrence) (2011)
- Swivel - Honey Ear Trio (2016)
- Lean - Lean (Miller, Jerome Sabbagh, Simon Jermyn) (2016)
- Parlour Game - Parlour Game (Jenny Scheinman, Miller, Carmen Staaf, Tony Scherr) (Royal Potato Family, 2019)
- Artemis - Artemis (2020, Blue Note)
- In Real Time - Artemis (2023, Blue Note)
- Arboresque - Artemis (2025, Blue Note)
- Tues Days (Duet with Jane Ira Bloom) (2021)

== As side musician ==
Miller's work as a session musician includes:

- Betty 3 - Betty (1999)
- No Walls - Virginia Mayhew (2000)
- Phantoms - Virginia Mayhew (2003)
- At The End of The Day - Agrazing Maze (2005)
- Fingerprint - Erik Deutsch (2007)
- Heart and Soul Live in San Francisco - Kitty Margolis (2005)
- Tiny Resistors - Todd Sickafoose (2008)
- Jungle Soul - Dr. Lonnie Smith (2008)
- Red Letter Year - Ani DiFranco (2008)
- Bear Creek - Brandi Carlile (2012)
- ¿Which Side Are You On? - Ani DiFranco (2012)
- The Stars Look Very Different Tonight - Ben Allison (2013)
- Out and About - Will Bernard (2016)
- Last Things Last - Greg Cordez (2017)
- An Eight Out of Nine - SLUGish Ensemble, Steven Lugerner (2018)
- Lioness - Lioness (all woman group) (2019)
- Redshift – Josh Deutsch (2020)
- Occasionally – Pat Donaher (2021)

== See also ==
- LGBTQ representation in jazz
