= LGBTQ representation in jazz =

There has been a longtime but relatively unknown history of LGBTQ representation in jazz.

== History ==
Since the Jazz Age, the genre has been popular with LGBTQ audiences. In Chicago, the Bronzeville and Woodlawn neighborhoods were home to several gay bars that hosted jazz performers and drag balls. These events on the South Side were often racially integrated with working-class queer crowds and provided a space for diverse identities at jazz clubs, until the clubs closed by the 1960s.

== LGBTQ jazz musicians ==
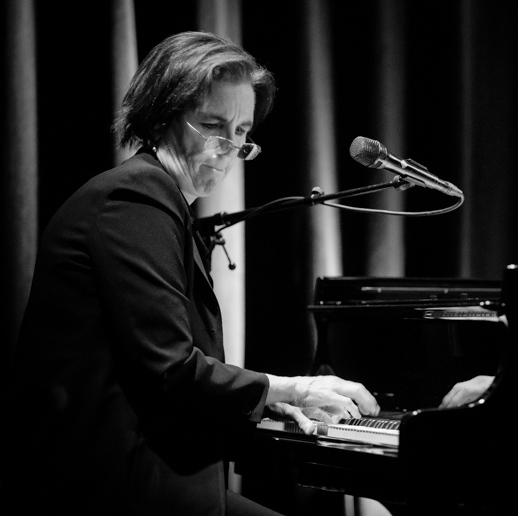
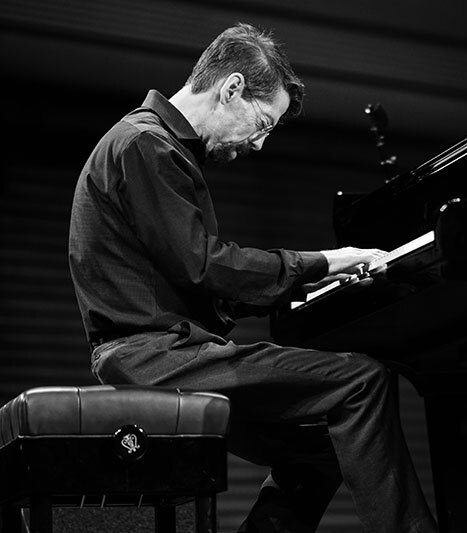
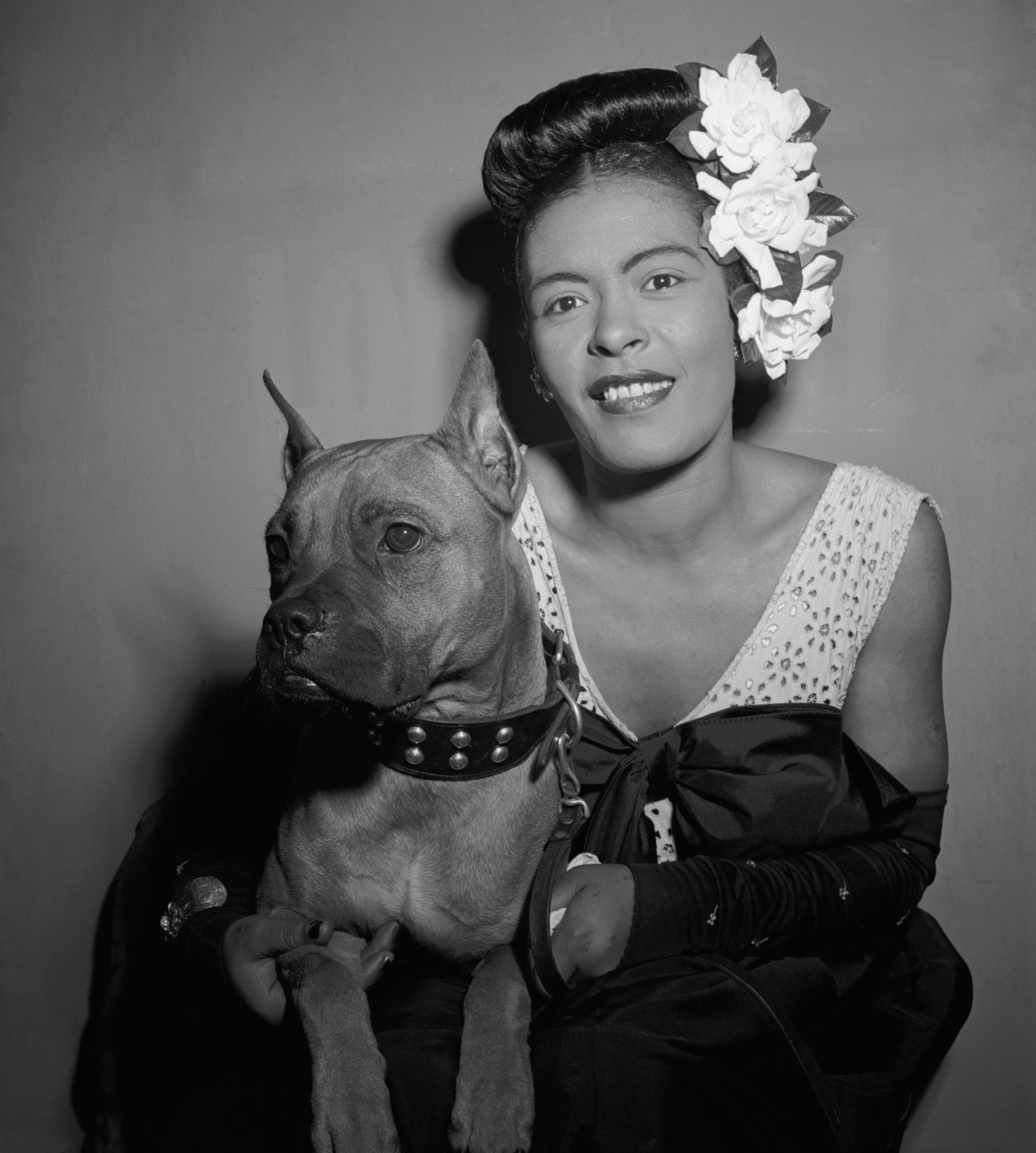
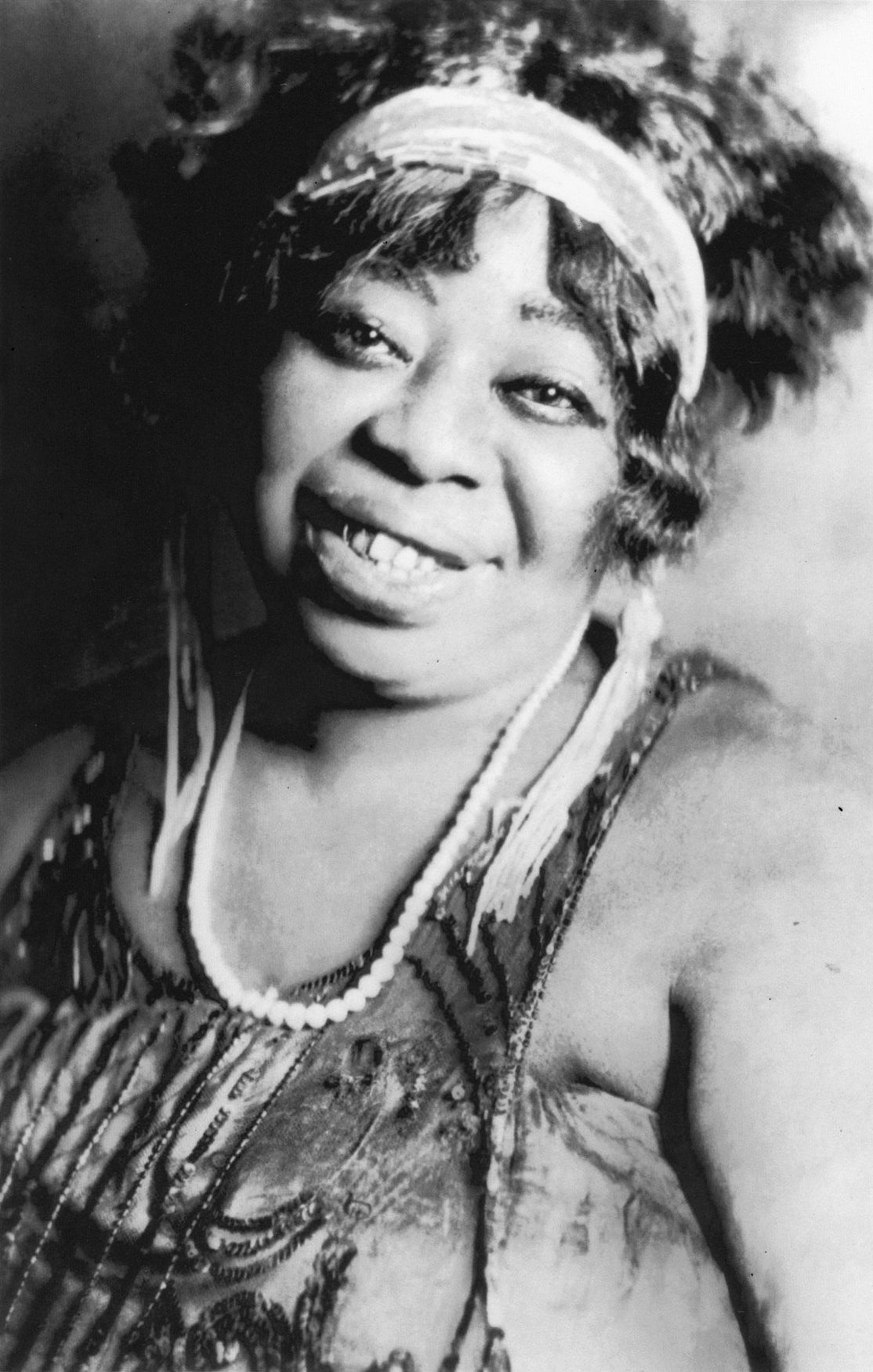
Patricia Barber (top left), Fred Hersch (top right), Billie Holiday (bottom left), and Ma Rainey (bottom right).

Patricia Barber, , Gladys Bently, Spencer Day, Tiny Davis, Fred Hersch, Billie Holiday, Tony Jackson, Dave Koz, Allison Miller, Ma Rainey, Billy Strayhorn and Cole Porter are among LGBTQ jazz musicians. Sammy Rae & The Friends is a "multi-genre pop/rock/jazz septet fronted by a charismatic queer- and bisexual-identifying female singer-songwriter."

Jazz has been known as "notoriously macho", but there were more openly gay and lesbian musicians by the 2000s, such as Barber, Andy Bey, and Gary Burton, who have inspired later generations of LGBTQ performers.

== Events ==
The first queer jazz festival in the United States took place in Philadelphia in 2014. Queer Jazz launched in London in 2023. The group's monthly LGBTQ jazz night started in Dalston in 2025.

Various LGBTQ-friendly bars have hosted jazz nights and queer jazz performers, such as Scandals in Portland, Oregon, and Petra's Bar in Charlotte, North Carolina, which uses jazz nights to be both an artistic and queer space and shape the local music scene. The New Orleans Jazz & Heritage Festival has also hosted drag queen brunches.

== See also ==
- LGBTQ representation in country music
- LGBTQ representation in hip-hop
