= Johnny Mathis =

American jazz-pop singer (born 1935)

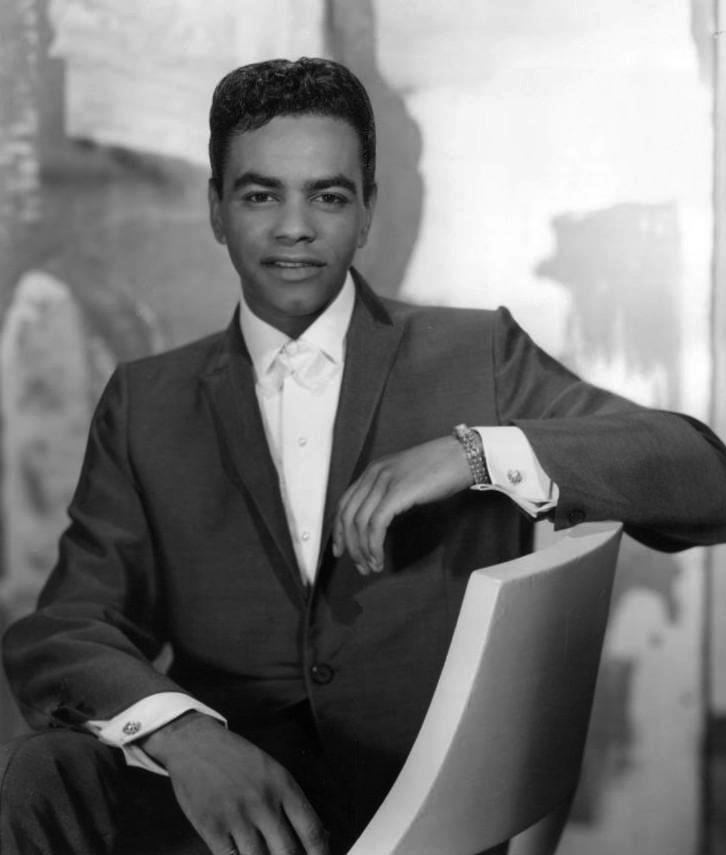
- Mathis in 1960

Background information
- Born: John Royce Mathis; September 30, 1935 (age 91); Gilmer, Texas, U.S.
- Origin: San Francisco, California, U.S
- Genres: Traditional pop; jazz
- Occupation: Singer
- Years active: 1956–present
- Labels: Columbia; His Master's Voice; Fontana; Mercury
- Website: johnnymathis.com

John Royce Mathis (born September 30, 1935) is an American singer. Starting his career with singles of standard music, Mathis is one of the best-selling recording artists of the 20th century. He became highly popular as an album artist, with several of his albums achieving gold or platinum status and 73 making the Billboard charts.

Mathis has received the Grammy Lifetime Achievement Award and has been inducted into the Grammy Hall of Fame for three recordings. Although frequently described as a romantic singer, his discography includes traditional pop, Latin American, soul, rhythm and blues, show tunes, Tin Pan Alley, soft rock, blues, country music, and even a few disco songs for his album Mathis Magic in 1979. Mathis has also recorded seven albums of Christmas music. In a 1968 interview, he cited Lena Horne, Nat King Cole, and Bing Crosby among his musical influences.

== Early life and education ==
Mathis was born in Gilmer, Texas, on September 30, 1935, the fourth of seven children of Clem Mathis and Mildred Boyd, both domestic cooks. Mathis is African-American and has said that he has Native American ancestry on his mother's side. The family moved to San Francisco when Mathis was five, settling on 32nd Avenue in the Richmond District, where he grew up to be an active member of the student body at George Washington High School. Mathis would perform for his classmates, already a clear vocal talent. While growing up, he sang in a church choir.

Clem Mathis worked in vaudeville as a singer and pianist, and on realizing his son's talent, bought an old upright piano for $25 (equal to $457 in 2025) and encouraged Mathis's musical pursuits. He began learning songs and routines from his father, and his parents also ran his fan club. Mathis's first song was "My Blue Heaven", and he started singing and dancing for visitors at home, school, and church functions.

When Mathis was 13, voice teacher Connie Cox accepted him as her student in exchange for housework. Mathis studied with Cox for six years, learning vocal scales and exercises, voice production, and classical and operatic singing. The first band he sang with was formed by his high school friend Merl Saunders. Mathis eulogized Saunders at his funeral in 2008, thanking him for that first chance to be a singer.

Mathis was a star athlete at George Washington High School in San Francisco. He was a high jumper, hurdler, and basketball player. In 1954, he enrolled at San Francisco State College on an athletic scholarship, competing in both basketball and track and intending to become an English and physical education teacher. There, he set a high jump record of 1.97 m (6 ft 5 1/2 in), still one of the college's top jump heights and only 7 cm (3 in) short of the 1952 Olympic record of 2.04 m (6 ft 8 1/2 in). Mathis and future National Basketball Association star Bill Russell were featured in a 1954 sports section article of the San Francisco Chronicle demonstrating their high-jumping skills; at the time, Russell was No. 1 while Mathis was No. 2 in the city of San Francisco.

== Career ==
=== Early years ===
While singing at a Sunday afternoon jam session with a friend's jazz sextet at the Black Hawk Club in San Francisco, Mathis attracted the attention of the club's co-founder, Helen Noga. She became his music manager and found him a job singing on weekends at Ann Dee's 440 Club. In September 1955, Noga learned that George Avakian, head of Popular Music A&R at Columbia Records, was on vacation near San Francisco. After repeated calls, Noga persuaded Avakian to hear Mathis at the 440 Club. After hearing Mathis sing, Avakian sent his record company a telegram reading: "Have found phenomenal 19-year-old boy who could go all the way. Send blank contracts."

At San Francisco State, Mathis became noteworthy as a high jumper and was asked to try out for the U.S. Olympic Team that traveled to Melbourne in November 1956. However, on his father's advice, Mathis opted to embark on a professional singing career.

Mathis's first album, Johnny Mathis: A New Sound In Popular Song, was a slow-selling jazz album, but he stayed in New York City to sing in nightclubs. His second album was produced by Columbia Records vice president and record producer Mitch Miller, who helped to define the Mathis sound. Miller preferred that Mathis sing soft romantic ballads, pairing him with conductor and music arranger Ray Conniff, and later Ray Ellis, Glenn Osser, and Robert Mersey. In late 1956, Mathis recorded two of his most popular songs: "Wonderful! Wonderful!" and "It's Not for Me to Say". That same year, Metro-Goldwyn-Mayer signed him to sing the latter song in the movie Lizzie (1957).

=== Showbiz millionaire ===
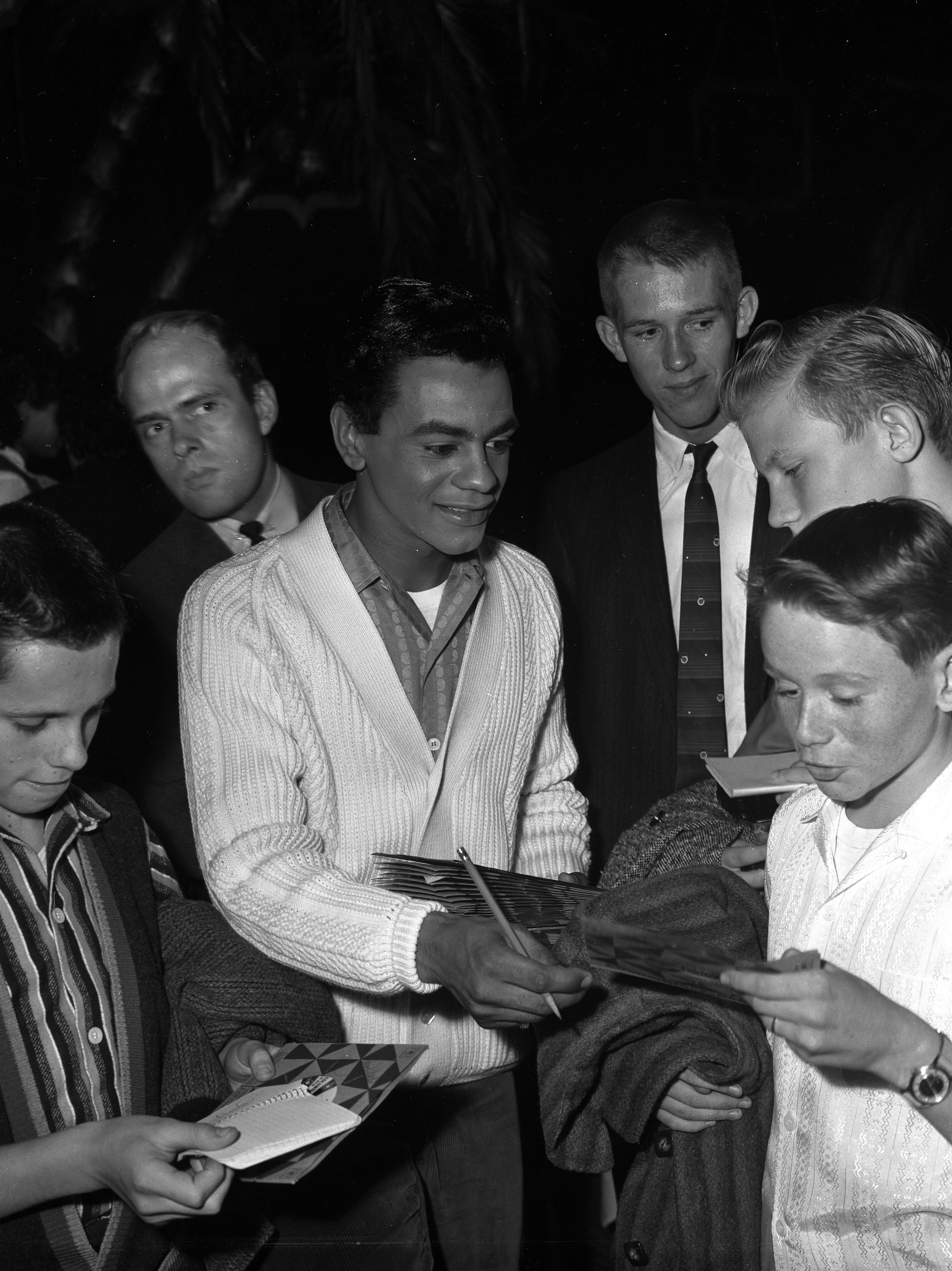
Mathis signing autographs in 1959

In June 1957, Mathis appeared on the TV program The Ed Sullivan Show, which helped increase his popularity. Later that year, he released his second single to sell one million copies, "Chances Are". In November, he released "Wild Is the Wind", which featured in the film of the same title and was nominated for the Academy Award for Best Original Song. Mathis performed the song at the ceremony in March 1958.

The week before Mathis appeared at the Academy Awards, Johnny's Greatest Hits was released. The album spent an unprecedented 490 consecutive weeks (nearly nine and a half years) on the Billboard top 200 album charts, including three weeks at number one. It held the record for the most weeks on the top Billboard 200 albums in the U.S. for 15 years, until Pink Floyd's The Dark Side of the Moon (March 1973) reached 491 weeks in October 1983.

Later in 1958, Mathis made his second film appearance for 20th Century Fox, singing the song "A Certain Smile" in the film of that title. The song was also nominated for the Academy Award for Best Original Song. By the end of the year, Mathis was set to earn $1 million a year. Critics called him "the velvet voice". In 1959, Mathis released his album Heavenly, which topped the Billboard album chart for five weeks during its historic 295-week run.

In 1962, Ebony magazine listed Mathis as one of 30-35 millionaires on its list of "America's 100 Richest Negroes". He had two of his biggest hits in 1962 and 1963, with "Gina" (number 6) and "What Will Mary Say" (number 9).

=== Split from Noga ===
In October 1964, Mathis sued Noga to void their management arrangement, which Noga fought with a countersuit in December. After splitting from Noga, Mathis established Jon Mat Records, incorporated in California on May 11, 1967, to produce his recordings, and Rojon Productions, incorporated in California on September 30, 1964, to handle all his concert, theater, showroom, and TV appearances, and all promotional and charitable activities. (Previously, Mathis had founded Global Records to produce his Mercury albums.) His new manager and business partner was Ray Haughn, who helped guide Mathis's career until his death in 1984.

=== Popularity plateau ===
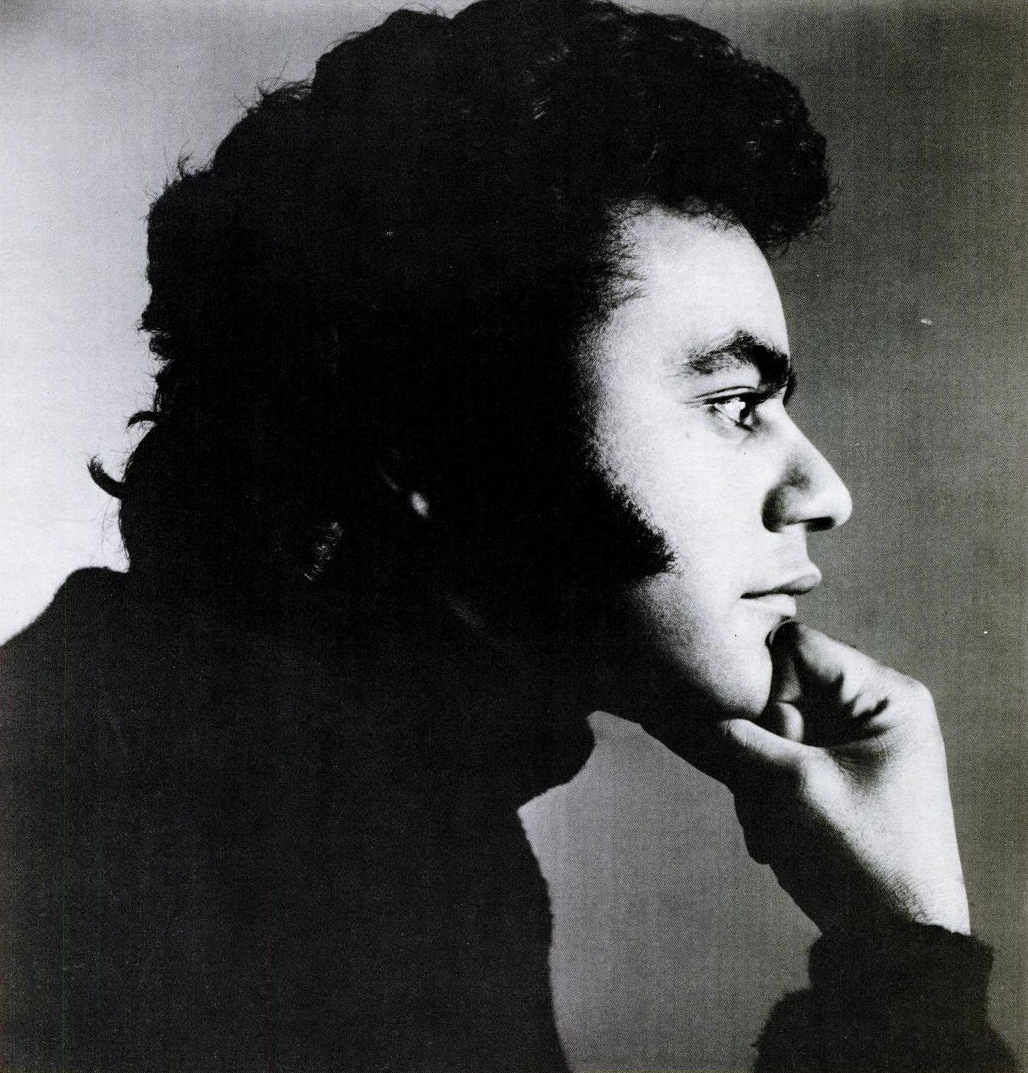
Mathis in 1974

While Mathis continued to make music, the ascent of the Beatles and early 1970s album rock kept his adult contemporary recordings off the pop singles charts until he experienced a career renaissance in the late 1970s. Mathis had the 1976 Christmas number one single in the UK with the song "When a Child Is Born", and two years later, he recorded "Too Much, Too Little, Too Late" with singer Deniece Williams. Nat Kipner and John McIntyre Vallins arranged its lyrics and music. Released as a single in 1978, it reached number one on the U.S. Billboard Hot 100 pop chart, number nine on the Canadian Singles Chart, and number three on the U.K. Singles Chart. It also topped the US R&B and adult contemporary charts. "Too Much, Too Little, Too Late" was certified gold and silver in the U.S. and the U.K. by the RIAA and the British Phonographic Industry, respectively. It was his first number one hit since "Chances Are".

The duo released a follow-up duet, their version of "You're All I Need to Get By", that peaked at number 47 on the Billboard Hot 100. In 1983, they were credited with performing "Without Us", the theme song for the American television sitcom Family Ties from its second season onward. The success of his duets with Williams prompted Mathis to record duets with various partners, including Dionne Warwick, Natalie Cole, Gladys Knight, Jane Olivor, Stephanie Lawrence, and Nana Mouskouri. A compilation album, also called Too Much, Too Little, Too Late, was released by Sony Music in 1995 and featured the title track among other songs by Mathis and Williams.

=== Recent years ===
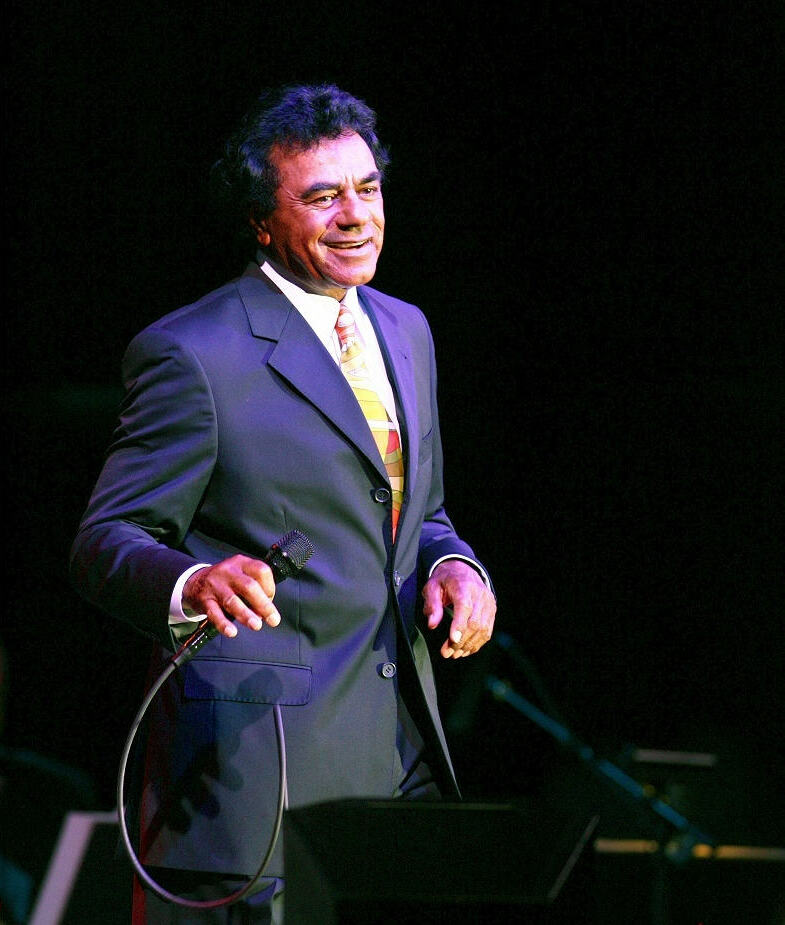
Mathis performing in 2006

From 1980 to 1981, Mathis recorded an album with Chic's Bernard Edwards and Nile Rodgers, I Love My Lady, that remained unreleased in its entirety until its 2017 appearance in the 68-disc collection The Voice of Romance: The Columbia Original Album Collection. (Three tracks appeared on a Chic box set in 2010 and a fourth, the title track, on Mathis's Ultimate Collection in 2011 and the Chic Organization's Up All Night in 2013.)

Mathis returned to the British Top 30 album chart in 2007 with the Sony BMG release The Very Best of Johnny Mathis; in 2008 with the CD "A Night to Remember"; and in 2011 with "The Ultimate Collection".

Mathis continued to perform live until May 2025. Starting in 2000, he limited his concert performances to about 50 to 60 per year. Mathis was one of the last pop singers to travel with his own full orchestra, as opposed to a band. Mathis frequently collaborated with comedians Gary Mule Deer and Brad Upton, who provided stand-up comedy routines in between his sets.

On January 14, 2016, Mathis performed to a sold-out audience in The Villages, Florida, as part of his 60th anniversary concert tour.

On September 28, 2024, Mathis performed his final birthday concert celebrating his 89th birthday at The Palace Theatre in Stamford, CT, though he continued to tour until May 2025.

On March 26, 2025, it was announced that Mathis would be retiring from touring in May 2025 due to "age and memory issues". He committed to performing all scheduled dates up to that point and canceled the rest of his previously planned concerts. On May 18, 2025, Mathis performed his final concert at the Bergen Performing Arts Center.

In 2025, NPR Music and Mathis's management began production on a series of short videos and social media content to commemorate his 70-year career and 90th birthday. The project, which included behind-the-scenes footage and archival materials, was suspended in 2025 following the elimination of federal funding for public broadcasting.

=== Career achievements ===
Mathis, Bob Dylan, Barbra Streisand, Tony Bennett, Billy Joel, and Bruce Springsteen are Columbia Records' longest-tenured artists. With the exception of a four-year break to record for Mercury Records in the mid-1960s, Mathis has been with Columbia throughout his career, from 1956 to 1963 and since 1968.

Five of Mathis's albums have been on the Billboard charts simultaneously, an achievement equaled by only three other singers: Frank Sinatra, Barry Manilow, and (posthumously) Prince. Mathis has released 200 singles and had 71 songs chart worldwide.

On April 16, 2024, Mathis's 1957 hit song "Chances Are" was inducted into the National Recording Registry by Librarian of Congress Dr. Carla Hayden & the NRR Board. "Librarian of Congress Carla Hayden today named 25 recordings as audio treasures worthy of preservation for all time based on their cultural, historical or aesthetic importance in the nation’s recorded sound heritage." The 2024 list included other luminaries such as Gene Autry, Blondie, ABBA, The Chicks, and Johnny's good friend the late Bill Withers, just to name a few.

"Johnny Mathis: Johnny's Greatest Hits", which was released in March 1958, was historically the first ever Greatest Hits album, and a tradition that has continued throughout the music industry ever since. The album debuted at #1 on the Billboard Pop Album for three consecutive weeks, continued in various positions for almost 490 weeks (almost 10 years), and was certified 3× Platinum in November 1999 by the RIAA (Recording Industry Association of America®).

== Other appearances ==
Mathis has taped 12 of his own television specials and made over 300 television guest appearances, 54 of them on The Tonight Show. Tonight Show host Johnny Carson said, "Johnny Mathis is the best ballad singer in the world." On March 29, 2007, Mathis appeared on the show with Carson's successor, Jay Leno, to sing "The Shadow of Your Smile" with saxophonist Dave Koz. Through the years, Mathis's songs (or parts of them) have been heard in more than 100 TV shows and films worldwide. His 1998 appearance on the Live by Request broadcast on A&E had the largest television viewing audience of the series. In 1989, Mathis sang the theme for the ABC daytime soap opera Loving.

Mathis served as narrator for '51 Dons, a 2014 documentary film about the integrated and the undefeated 1951 San Francisco Dons football team. The team was denied a chance to play in a bowl game because it refused to agree not to play its two African-American players, Ollie Matson and Burl Toler, who were childhood friends of Mathis.

Mathis appeared in the Season 14 finale of Criminal Minds, "Truth or Dare", playing himself. He also played himself in the 2017 film Just Getting Started.

== Personal life ==
Despite missing the Olympic high-jump trials, Mathis retains his enthusiasm for sports. He is an avid golfer and has nine holes-in-one. Mathis has also hosted several Johnny Mathis Golf Tournaments in the U.K. and the U.S. Since 1985, he has hosted a charity golf tournament in Belfast sponsored by Shell, and the annual Johnny Mathis Invitational Track & Field Meet has continued at San Francisco State University since it started in 1982. Mathis also enjoys cooking, and published a cookbook, Cooking for You Alone, in 1982.

Mathis has undergone rehabilitation for alcoholism and has supported many organizations, including the American Cancer Society, the March of Dimes, the YWCA and YMCA, the Muscular Dystrophy Association, the NAACP, and APLA.

In a 1982 Us magazine article, Mathis said, "Homosexuality is a way of life that I've grown accustomed to." He later said the comment was supposed to have been off the record and did not publicly discuss his sexual orientation for many years. In 2006, Mathis said that his silence had been due to death threats he received as a result of that 1982 article. In April 2006, he addressed the subject again on the podcast The Strip and said his reluctance to speak about it was partly a generational issue. In a 2017 interview with CBS News Sunday Morning, Mathis discussed the Us magazine article and confirmed that he is gay, saying: "I come from San Francisco. It's not unusual to be gay in San Francisco. I've had some girlfriends, some boyfriends, just like most people. But I never got married, for instance. I knew that I was gay." Mathis spoke to many news sources, including CBS, about his sexuality and his coming out story.

In November 2015, Mathis returned home from a concert in Ohio to find his Hollywood house destroyed by a fire. Mathis had owned it for 56 years. On January 17, 2023, a series of powerful storms drenched the hillside in front of his home, causing the hillside's collapse. The landslide cut off utilities, exposing water pipes and infrastructure to the elements, taking out landscaping and terrain next to the home. "Other than Mathis' hillside and a nearby Jaguar car, there was no other property damaged ... The vehicle did not belong to the singer, but is 'the car of a very nice neighbor of his. Once a City permit is issued, the dirt and debris will be safely moved and repair work can commence'".

The character Shy Baldwin from The Marvelous Mrs. Maisel is a composite character based on several different singers, but Rachel Brosnahan said that she most strongly associated Mathis with the character.

== Honors and awards ==
=== Grammys ===
In 2003, the Academy of Recording Arts and Sciences awarded Mathis the Lifetime Achievement Award. This Special Merit Award is presented by vote of the Recording Academy's National Trustees to performers who, during their lifetimes, have made creative contributions of outstanding artist significance to the field of recording.

=== Grammy Hall of Fame ===
Mathis has been inducted into the Grammy Hall of Fame for three separate recordings: in 1998 for "Chances Are", in 2002 for "Misty", and in 2008 for "It's Not for Me to Say".

Grammy Hall of Fame Awards
Year Recorded	Title	Genre	Label	Year Inducted
1957	"It's Not for Me to Say"	Traditional Pop (Single)	Columbia	2008
1959	"Misty"	Traditional Pop (Single)	Columbia	2002
1957	"Chances Are"	Traditional Pop (Single)	Columbia	1998

=== Great American Songbook Hall of Fame ===
On June 21, 2014, Mathis was inducted into the Great American Songbook Hall of Fame along with Linda Ronstadt, Shirley Jones, and Nat King Cole (whose daughter Natalie Cole accepted the award on his behalf). Center for the Performing Arts artistic director Michael Feinstein presented the awards. According to its website, "Conceived as an enduring testament to the Great American Songbook, the Hall of Fame honors performers and composers responsible for creating America's soundtrack."

=== Other ===
On June 1, 1972, Mathis was awarded a star on the Hollywood Walk of Fame for his contributions to music. Six years later, his hit duet "The Last Time I Felt Like This" from the film Same Time, Next Year was nominated for an Academy Award for Best Original Song. Mathis and Jane Olivor sang the song at the Academy Awards ceremony. It was his second performance at the Oscars; his first was in 1958, when Mathis sang "Wild Is the Wind" by Dimitri Tiomkin and Ned Washington from the movie of the same name. Mathis was also awarded the Society of Singers Lifetime Achievement Award in 2006. In 2007, he was inducted into the Hit Parade Hall of Fame. In 1988, Mathis appeared as a guest vocalist, accompanied by Henry Mancini, on Late Night with David Letterman to sing Mancini's theme to the "Viewer Mail" segment. In 2011, Mathis received the Golden Plate Award of the American Academy of Achievement, presented by Awards Council member General Colin Powell.

In 2017, San Francisco State University awarded Mathis an honorary Doctor of Fine Arts degree. He attended San Francisco State for three semesters before withdrawing in 1956 to pursue his music career.

== Bibliography ==
- Mathis, Johnny; Brash, Peter; Birch, Marge (1982). Cooking for You Alone. Pasadena, California: Tech. Educ. Co. ISBN 978-0-939402-00-7.
