= As We Are Now =

Studio album by Renee Rosnes
- Released: 1997
- Recorded: March 12, 1997
- Studios: Van Gelder Studio, Englewood Cliffs, NJ
- Genre: Jazz
- Length: 59:38
- Label: Blue Note
- Producers: Don Sickler, Renee Rosnes

Renee Rosnes chronology
Ancestors (1995)	As We Are Now (1997)	Art & Soul (1999)

As We Are Now is an album by pianist Renee Rosnes which was recorded in 1997 and released on the Blue Note label.

== Reception ==
Professional ratings
Review scores
Source	Rating
AllMusic	4/5 stars
The Penguin Guide to Jazz Recordings	4/4 stars

The AllMusic review by Leo Stanley stated "As We Are Now is another wonderful session from pianist Renee Rosnes, finding her navigating a challenging set of six original compositions and three covers ... As We Are Now finds the limits of hard bop and pushes it further, resulting in an adventurous, rewarding listen". In JazzTimes, Owen Cordle noted " Canadian pianist Rosnes occasionally recalls Lennie Tristano, although she plays in a less complex, more fluid manner. Her sense of linear development is finely tuned, and she has a vigorous sense of rhythm. In fact, energetic playing characterizes most of this date ... There’s considerable emotional involvement in these and the other performances, an investment you’ll probably dig along with the chops and freshness".

== Track listing ==
All compositions by Renee Rosnes except where noted

1. "Black Holes" – 6:35
2. "The Land of Five Rivers" – 6:11
3. "Abstraction Blue (For Georgia O'Keeffe)" – 6:30
4. "Mizmahta" – 6:06
5. "Non-Fiction" (Walt Weiskopf) – 6:17
6. "Bulldog's Chicken Run" – 8:27
7. "As We Are Now" – 7:56
8. "Absinthe" (Chris Potter) – 6:09
9. "Pee Wee" (Tony Williams) – 5:27

== Personnel ==
- Renee Rosnes – piano
- Chris Potter – tenor saxophone, soprano saxophone
- Christian McBride – bass
- Jack DeJohnette – drums
