= Written in the Rocks =

Studio album by Renee Rosnes
- Released: February 5, 2016
- Recorded: June 15–16, 2015
- Studio: Sear Sound Studio C, New York City
- Genre: Jazz
- Length: 56:48
- Label: Smoke Sessions
- Producer: Paul Stache

Renee Rosnes chronology
Manhattan Rain (2010)	Written in the Rocks (2016)	Beloved of the Sky (2018)

Written in the Rocks is an album by Canadian jazz pianist Renee Rosnes which was released in 2016 by Smoke Sessions Records. It won the 2017 Juno Award for Solo Jazz Album of the Year.

== Track listing ==
All compositions by Renee Rosnes. Tracks 1 - 7 are The Galapagos Suite.

No.	Title	Length
1.	"The KT Boundary"	4:42
2.	"Galapagos"	7:13
3.	"So Simple a Beginning"	6:15
4.	"Lucy From Afar"	6:37
5.	"Written in The Rocks"	5:14
6.	"Deep in The Blue (Tiktaalik)"	7:34
7.	"Cambrian Explosion"	5:25
8.	"From Here to A Star"	8:05
9.	"Goodbye Mumbai"	5:43

== Personnel ==
Personnel:

- Renee Rosnes – piano
- Steve Wilson – flute (tracks 1 and 3), soprano sax (tracks 1 and 7), alto sax (tracks 6 and 9)
- Peter Washington – bass
- Bill Stewart – drums
- Steve Nelson – vibraphone
