= Noriko Ueda =

Japanese jazz musician and composer

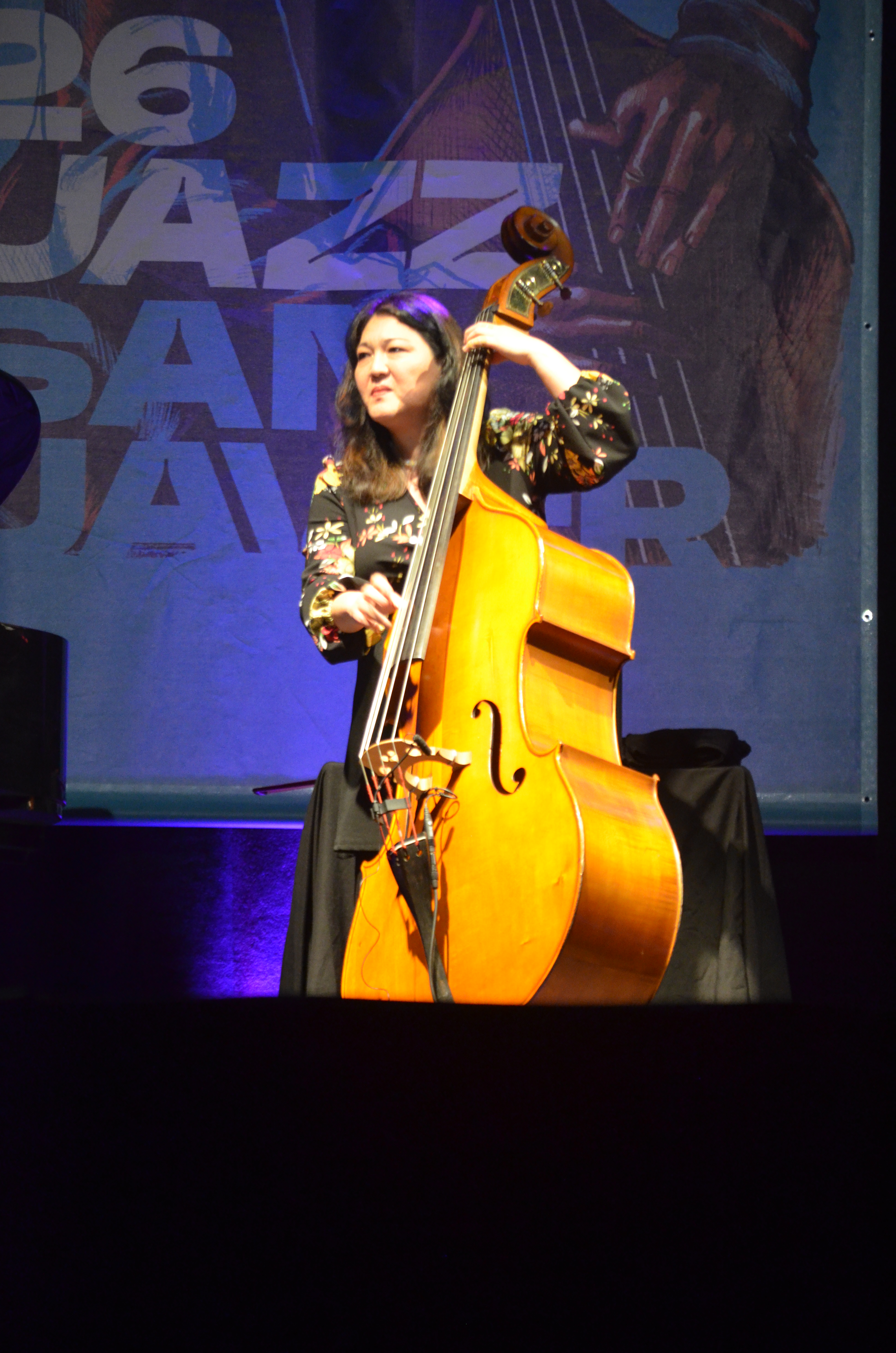
Noriko Ueda at San Javier Jazz Festival in 2024

Noriko Ueda (植田 典子) (born 14 March 1972) is a Japanese jazz bassist, composer and arranger.

Ueda was born in Hyogo prefecture, Japan, and is based in New York City. She trained in classical piano and voice, as well as acoustic and electric bass and studied classical voice at the Osaka College of Music and jazz composition at Berklee College of Music.

Ueda is a member of the Sherrie Maricle led all-woman big band the DIVA Jazz Orchestra, as well as the DIVA Jazz Trio and Five Play. She is also a member of Artemis, an all woman jazz supergroup led by Renee Rosnes, which was signed to the Blue Note label in 2020. The group released three albums under the label and won Downbeat Magazine's Jazz Group of the Year in 2023, and 2024,

She won the third annual BMI Foundation Charlie Parker Jazz composition prize in 2002 for her work "Castle in the North."
