= Tanglewood Music Festival =

Massachusetts, US, classical music festival

- Genre: classical music
- Dates: July, August
- Locations: Tanglewood, Massachusetts
- Coordinates: 42.349222°N 73.309972°W
- Years active: 1934-present
- Website: www.bso.org/tanglewood

The Tanglewood Music Festival is a music festival held every summer on the Tanglewood estate in Stockbridge and Lenox in the Berkshire Hills in western Massachusetts.

The festival consists of a series of concerts, including symphonic music, chamber music, choral music, musical theater, contemporary music, jazz, and pop music. The Boston Symphony Orchestra is in residence at the festival, but many of the concerts are put on by other groups. It is one of the premier music festivals in the United States and one of the top in the world.

== See also ==
- Boston University Tanglewood Institute
- Tanglewood Jazz Festival
