= Artemis (band) =

American jazz ensemble

- Origin: New York City, U.S.
- Genres: Jazz, post-bop
- Years active: 2016–present
- Label: Blue Note
- Members: Renee Rosnes; Ingrid Jensen; Nicole Glover; Noriko Ueda; Allison Miller
- Past members: Cécile McLorin Salvant; Anat Cohen; Melissa Aldana; Alexa Tarantino

Artemis is a multinational and intergenerational jazz ensemble formed in 2016. The group's musical director is pianist Renee Rosnes. The band features an international lineup of jazz artists.

== History ==
At the suggestion of a French promoter, Rosnes formed Artemis to perform concerts in Paris and Luxembourg for International Women’s Day. After the success of those initial European performances, the musicians decided to formalize the project into a permanent working band.

The original lineup was a septet, with trumpeter Ingrid Jensen, drummer Terri Lyne Carrington, bassist Linda May Han Oh, clarinetist Anat Cohen, saxophonist Melissa Aldana and singer Cécile McLorin Salvant. The group initially toured under different variations before adopting the name Artemis, after the Greek goddess of the hunt.

A European tour in 2017 introduced the group’s permanent rhythm section: Allison Miller on drums and Noriko Ueda on bass. Blue Note Records signed Artemis on the spot after its set at the Newport Jazz Festival in 2018. That performance was recorded by NPR’s Jazz Night in America program. They released their eponymous debut album in September 2020 on Blue Note Records.

They were voted Group of the Year in the DownBeat Readers Poll in 2023, 2024, and 2025.

== Band members ==
Current members

- Renee Rosnes – piano, musical director
- Ingrid Jensen – trumpet
- Nicole Glover – tenor saxophone
- Noriko Ueda – bass
- Allison Miller – drums

Former members

- Cécile McLorin Salvant – vocals
- Anat Cohen – clarinet
- Melissa Aldana – tenor saxophone
- Alexa Tarantino – alto saxophone

== Discography ==
All studio albums released via Blue Note Records.

- Artemis (September 11, 2020)
- In Real Time (May 5, 2023)
- Arboresque (February 14, 2025)
