= Tobias Meinhart =

German Jazz saxophonist (1983)

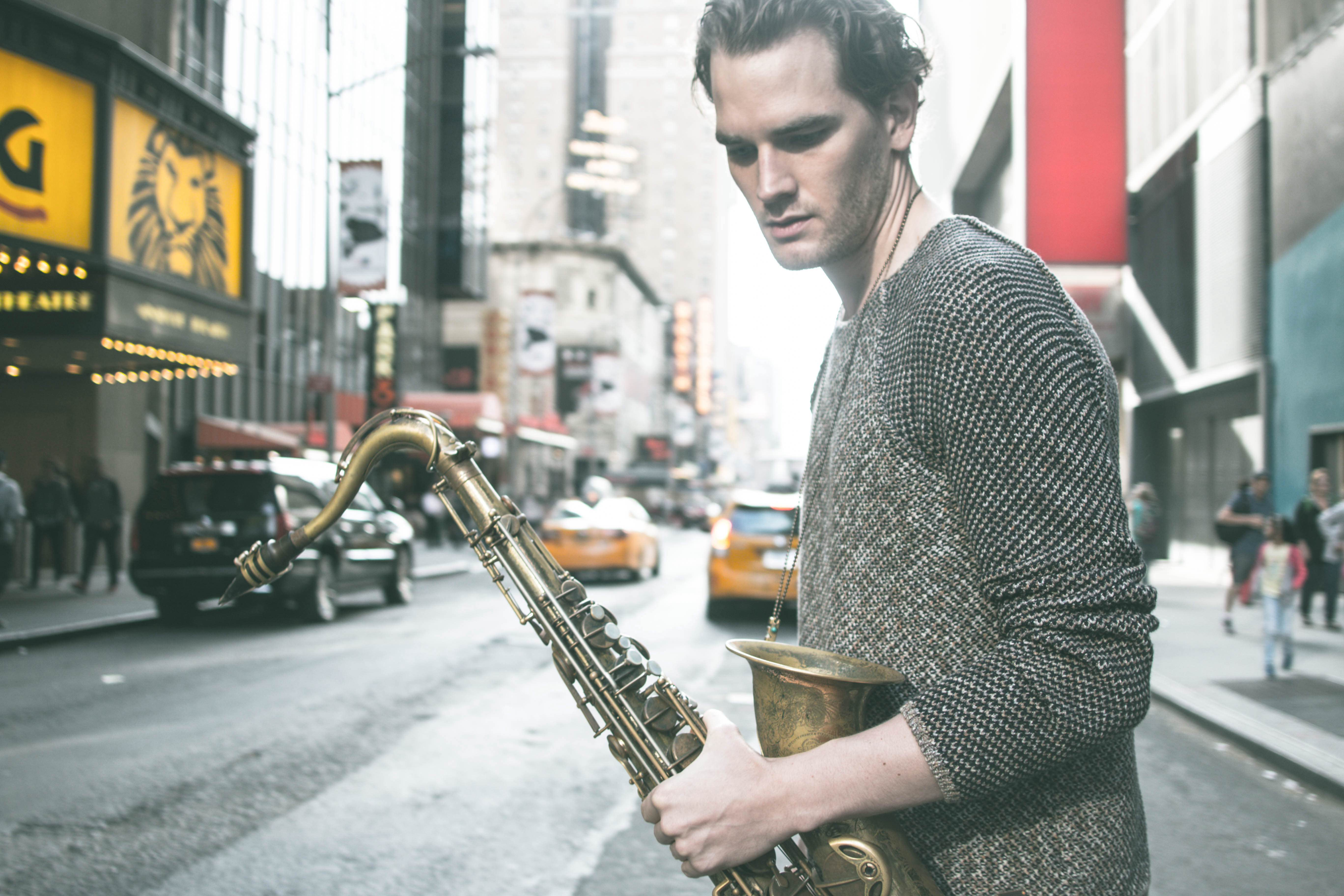
Tobias Meinhart in New York City

Tobias Meinhart (born 1983 in Regensburg) is a German modern jazz soprano and tenor saxophonist and composer.

Meinhart, who grew up in Wörth an der Donau, came to his music through his grandfather, a contrabassist. He started playing the drums at the age of seven and switched to the saxophone at the age of 13. At the age of 17 he accompanied the Bob Brookmeyer Orchestra as a roadie on a tour to Portugal. He first studied at the Music College in Basel with Domenic Landolf, and went on to pursue his diploma studies at the Conservatorium of Amsterdam and the Berne College of Art.

Since 2008, Meinhart has been conducting his own quartet, with which he released a first album. Further albums followed, including a live recording of a concert, which he gave in 2012 with the quintet-expanded band at the Getxo Jazz Festival in Bilbao, Spain. Since August 2010, Meinhart has been living in New York City, where he completed a master's degree in Jazz Performance at Queens College in 2012. He played with Aaron Goldberg and went on a concert tour with trumpeter Ingrid Jensen, releasing Natural Perception, his fourth album, with her, Phil Donkin and Jesse Simpson in 2015. In autumn 2015, the band went on tour in Europe.
