= Ancestors (Renee Rosnes album) =

1996 album by Renee Rosnes

Studio album by Renee Rosnes
- Released: 1996
- Studios: Power Station, New York City
- Genre: Jazz
- Length: 61:00
- Label: Blue Note
- Producer: Bob Belden

Renee Rosnes chronology
Without Words (1992)	Ancestors (1996)	As We Are Now (1997)

Professional ratings
Review scores
Source	Rating
The Penguin Guide to Jazz Recordings	3.5/4 stars

Ancestors is an album by Canadian jazz pianist Renee Rosnes, which was released in 1996 by Blue Note Records. It won the 1997 Juno Award for Best Mainstream Jazz Album.

== Track listing ==
No.	Title	Music	Length
1.	"Upa Neguinho"	Edu Lobo	6:18
2.	"The Sounds Around the House"	Alec Wilder	6:34
3.	"Intuition"	Walt Weiskopf	8:31
4.	"The Ache of Absence"	Renee Rosnes	8:58
5.	"Ancestors"	Renee Rosnes	9:40
6.	"Lifewish"	Renee Rosnes	7:36
7.	"The Gift"	Renee Rosnes	5:52
8.	"Chasing Spirits"	Renee Rosnes	7:31

== Personnel ==
- Renee Rosnes – piano
- Chris Potter – tenor & soprano sax
- Nicholas Payton – trumpet
- Peter Washington – bass
- Al Foster – drums
- Don Alias – percussion
