= Ingrid Jensen =

Canadian jazz trumpeter (born 1966)

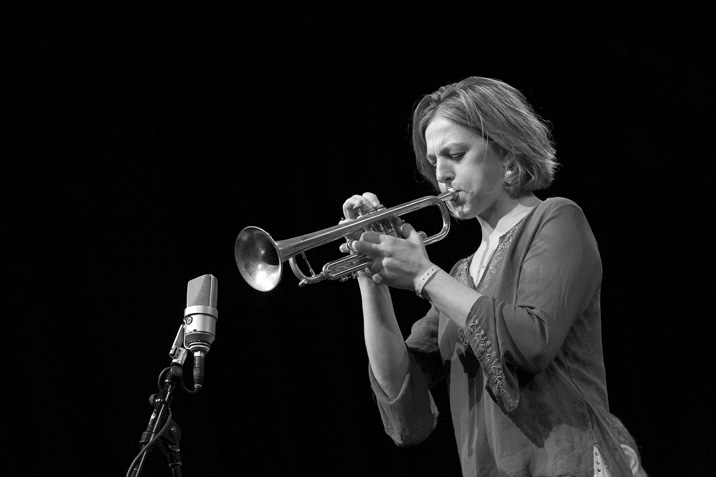
- Ingrid Jensen, North Sea Jazz festival, 2008

Background information
- Born: January 12, 1966 (age 60); North Vancouver, British Columbia, Canada
- Genre: Jazz
- Occupation: Musician
- Instrument: Trumpet
- Years active: 1987–present
- Labels: Enja, SteepleChase, Justin Time, ArtistShare, Whaling City Sound, Whirlwind
- Website: www.ingridjensen.com

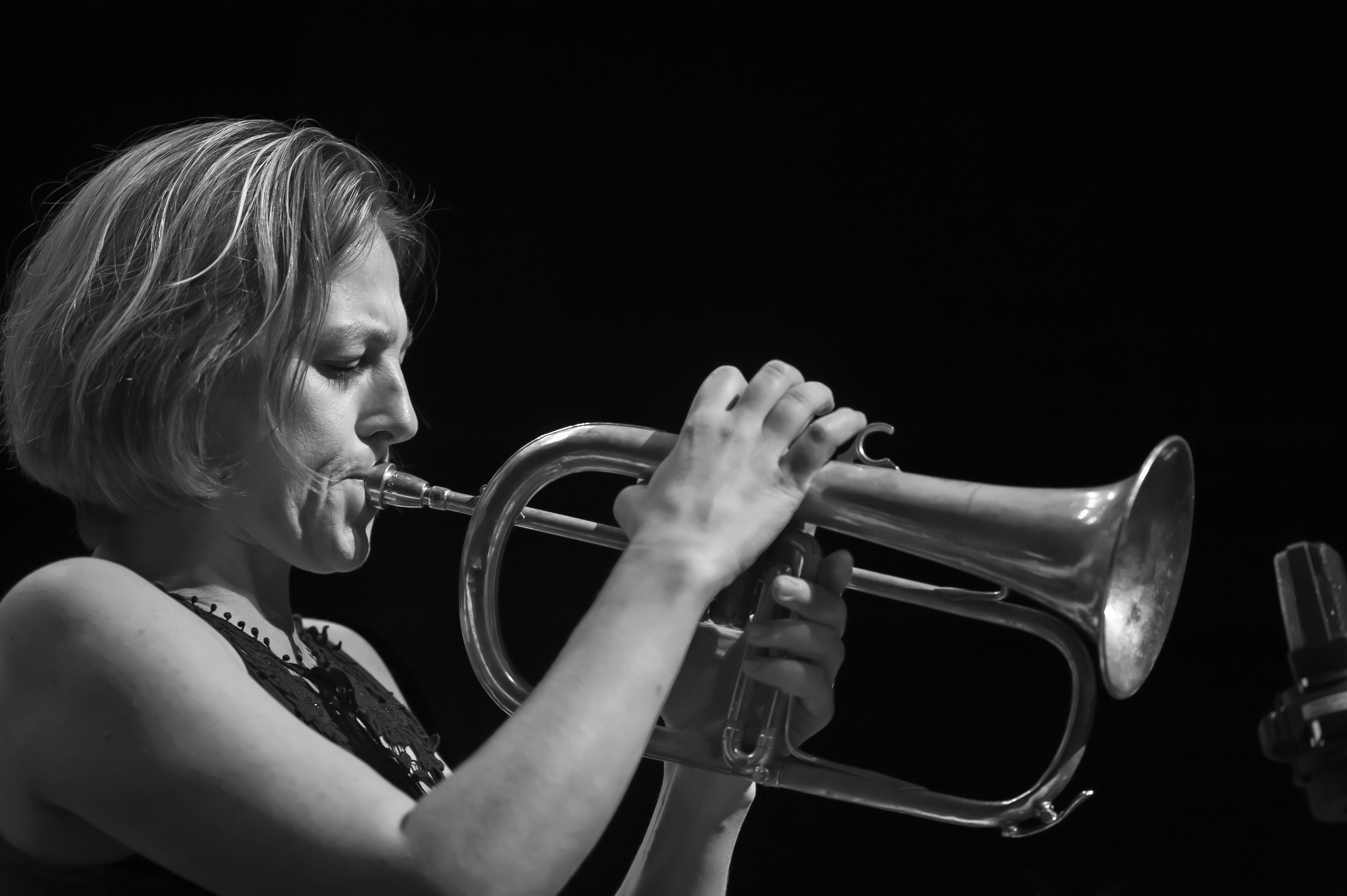
Ingrid Jensen, TD Canada Trust Toronto Jazz Festival, 2009

Ingrid Jensen (born January 12, 1966) is a Canadian jazz trumpeter.

== Music career ==
Jensen was born in North Vancouver and grew up in Nanaimo. She received a scholarship to the Berklee College of Music in Boston.

After graduating from Berklee, she toured with the Vienna Art Orchestra and taught at the Bruckner Conservatory in Austria when she was 25. She went back to the U.S. in 1994 and became a member of the DIVA Big Band. During the same year, her debut album Vernal Fields (Enja, 1994) appeared and won a Juno Award.

Jensen has worked with Maria Schneider, Steve Wilson, Jeff "Tain" Watts, Dr. Lonnie Smith, Bob Berg, Gary Bartz, Bill Stewart, Terri Lyne Carrington, Geoffrey Keezer, Billy Hart, George Garzone, Chris Connor, Victor Lewis, Clark Terry, Frank Wess, and Billy Taylor, as well as her sister Christine Jensen.

She has performed on Saturday Night Live with the British soul singer Corrine Bailey Rae and in the horn section backing actor Denis Leary.

Since 2020 she has recorded and performed with the jazz band Artemis, led by Renee Rosnes.

== Discography ==
=== As leader ===
- Vernal Fields (Enja, 1995)
- Around the World I (ACT, 1997)
- Leave It to DIVA (DIVA, 1997)
- Here on Earth (Enja, 1997)
- Higher Ground (Enja, 1999)
- Now as Then with Gary Versace, Jon Wikan (Justin Time, 2003)
- At Sea (ArtistShare, 2005)
- Flurry (ArtistShare, 2007)
- Kind of New with Jason Miles (Whaling City Sound, 2015)
- Infinitude with Christine Jensen, Ben Monder (Whirlwind, 2016)
- Invisible Sounds with Steve Treseler (Whirlwind, 2018)
- Landings with George Coleman, Gary Versace (Newvelle, 2026)

=== As a member ===
Artemis

- Artemis (Blue Note, 2020)
- In Real Time (Blue Note, 2023)
- Arboresque (Blue Note, 2025)

=== As guest ===
With Darcy James Argue

- Infernal Machines (New Amsterdam, 2009)
- Brooklyn Babylon (New Amsterdam, 2013)

With Terri Lyne Carrington

- The Mosaic Project (Concord, 2011)
- The Mosaic Project: Love and Soul (Concord, 2015)

With Christine Jensen

- Collage (Effendi, 2000)
- Treelines (Justin Time, 2010)

With Tobias Meinhart

- Natural Perception (Enja, 2015)
- Silent Dreamer (Enja, 2015)

With Maria Schneider

- Allegresse (ArtistShare, 2000)
- Days Of Wine And Roses - Live at the Jazz Standard (ArtistShare, 2000)
- Concert in the Garden (ArtistShare, 2004)
- Sky Blue (ArtistShare, 2007)

With others

- Otto Brandenburg, Otto Brandenburg (Mermaid Music, 1989)
- Canadian Brass, Canadiana; one track - "Both Sides Now" (Linus, 2021)
- George Colligan, The Newcomer (SteepleChase, 1997)
- Chris Connor, Haunted Heart (HighNote, 2001)
- Dena DeRose, Another World (Sharp Nine, 1999)
- Peter Herbert, B-A-C-H A Chromatic Universe (Between the Lines, 2000)
- Monika Herzig, Sheroes (Whaling City Sound, 2018)
- Anne Mette Iversen, On the Other Side (Okapi, 2003)
- Mimi Jones, Balance (Hot Tone Music, 2013)
- Geoffrey Keezer, Falling Up (Max Jazz, 2003)
- Virginia Mayhew, A Simple Thank You (Renma, 2007)
- Sarah McKenzie, We Could Be Lovers (2014)
- Sarah McLachlan, Shine On (Universal, 2014)
- Chris McNulty, Whispers of the Heart (2006)
- Eric Person, Rhythm Edge (2007)
- Karl Ratzer, Bayou (Bellaphon, 1993)
- Dianne Reeves, Beautiful Life (Concord, 2013)
- Rufus Reid, Quiet Pride (Motema, 2013)
- George Schuller, Round 'Bout Now (Playscape, 2003)
- Judi Silvano, Let Yourself Go (Zoho, 2004)
- Ike Sturm, Jazz Mass (2009)
- Helen Sung, Sung Without Words (Stricker Street, 2018)
- Roseanna Vitro, Catchin' Some Rays (Telarc, 1997)
- Dan Wall, Off the Wall (Enja, 1997)
