= Jeff Linsky =

American fingerstyle guitarist (born 1952)

- Born: April 12, 1952 (age 74); Whittier, California, U.S.
- Genres: Jazz, Classical, Latin, New Age
- Occupation: Musician
- Instruments: Guitar, ukulele
- Years active: 1969–present
- Labels: Concord, GSP
- Website: www.jefflinsky.com

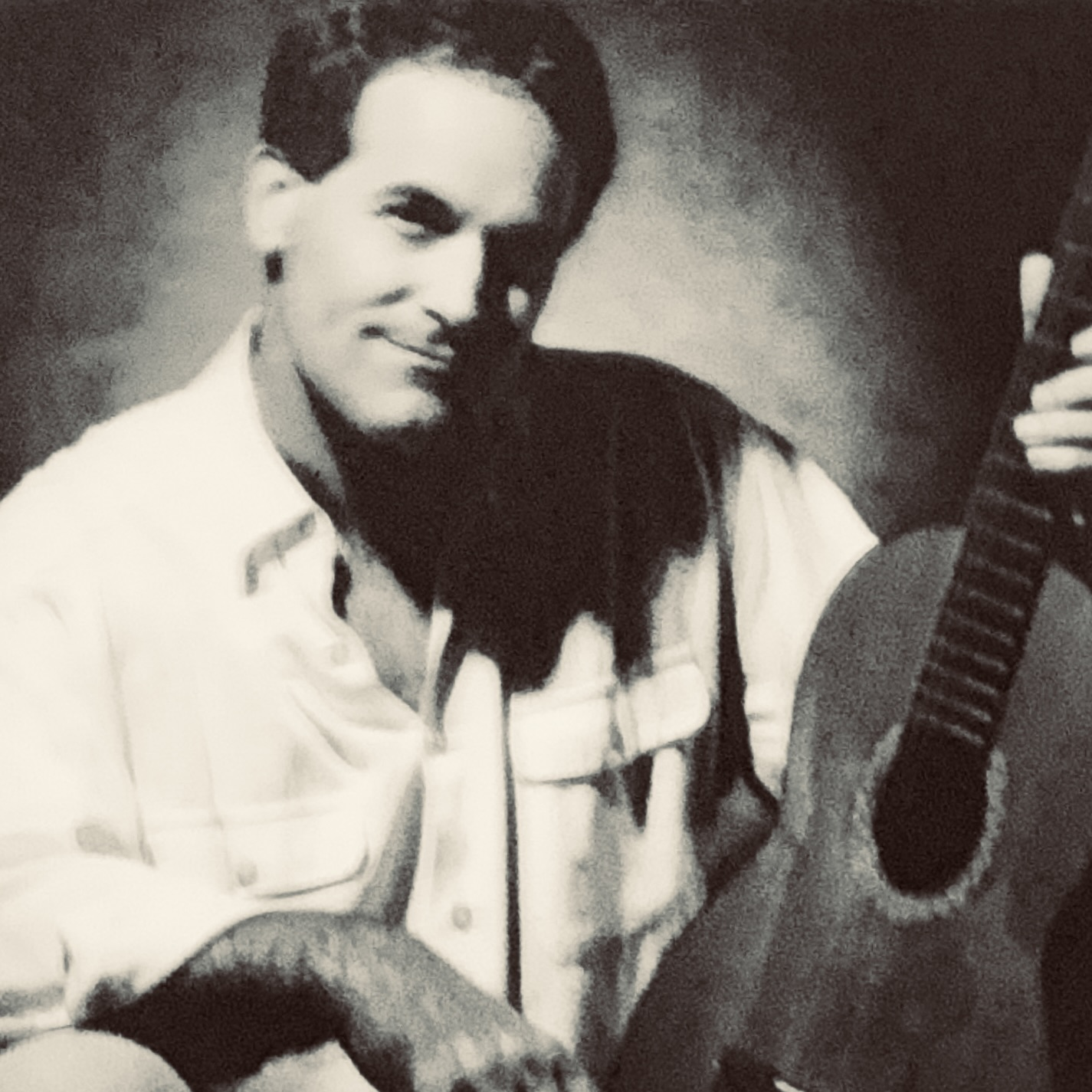
Jeff Linsky, photo by Michael Collopy

Jeff Linsky (born April 12, 1952) is an American musician, composer, and recording artist known for his polyphonic improvisational technique on the classical guitar. His 1992 album Solo, in particular, received critical attention for its orchestral approach to solo guitar improvisation. His recordings and performances have been discussed in numerous publications, including the Los Angeles Times, DownBeat, Guitar Player, Acoustic Guitar, Classical Guitar Magazine, Tribuna da Imprensa (Brazil), and Gendai Guitar (Japan). He has performed internationally throughout the Americas, Europe, Asia, and the South Pacific.

== Career ==
Linsky began performing and recording at an early age, releasing his debut album Compositions in the early 1970s. While living in Hawaii from 1972 to 1988, he developed his fingerstyle approach and began performing at guitar festivals and concert venues. In 1978, he was featured at the Carmel Classic Guitar Festival, where his performance was recorded and released as Jeff Linsky In Concert.

By the 1980s and 1990s, Linsky established an international career as a solo artist and collaborator, performing throughout the Americas, Europe, Asia, and the South Pacific. His recordings for Concord Records, including Up Late, Angel’s Serenade, California, and Passport to the Heart, brought wider recognition. His composition “Monterey,” from Up Late, was used as a broadcast theme for the Monterey Jazz Festival on affiliated radio stations including KKJZ 88.1 FM (KJazz). He has also appeared as a guest guitarist on international recordings, including the Brazilian album Tudo que arde, cura by Sérgio Augusto, recorded in São Paulo. Linsky has also performed internationally as a ukulele artist, including a jazz ukulele tour of China supported by Ohana Ukuleles.

== Style and reception ==
In a review for Guitar Player, Jim Ferguson wrote that Linsky’s "ability to freely improvise arrangements that sound like finely honed compositions is nothing short of miraculous."

Writing in Acoustic Guitar, Jeffrey Pepper Rodgers noted that Linsky "seems to have bridged entirely that troublesome gap between brain and fingers."

Reviewing Linsky’s sold-out concerts at Hawaii Public Radio’s Atherton Studio, Soundsgood! noted his virtuoso guitar technique and also highlighted his humor in performance.

== Film and television ==
Linsky has composed and recorded music for film and television, including work featured on the TBS series World of Audubon. His composition "Playa de Los Lobos" was used in the Drive Thru surf travel series on Fuel TV, filmed in locations including Panama, Brazil, and Chile.

Among Linsky’s television appearances is a 2024 feature interview and performance on CNN Philippines, where he was interviewed by Rico Hizon in support of his concerts in Manila.

His composition "Kalaupapa" was later re-recorded on ukulele for use in the film Shipping Day.

== Teaching and publications ==
In addition to his performing career, Linsky has presented workshops, master classes, and concert clinics at dozens of institutions, including the University of Southern California, the San Francisco Conservatory of Music, the Wisconsin Conservatory of Music, the University of Hawaii, Chulalongkorn University in Bangkok, and SUNY Oswego.

Linsky has also published instructional materials and compositions through Mel Bay Publications and Guitar Solo Publications (GSP), contributing to the classical and fingerstyle guitar repertoire.

== Discography ==
=== As leader ===
- Compositions (Insight, early 1970s)
- Jeff Linsky In Concert (live, 1978)
- Simpatico (GSP, 1991)
- Solo (GSP, 1992)
- Rendezvous (GSP, 1992)
- Up Late (Concord Records, 1988)
- Angel’s Serenade (Concord Records, 1994)
- California (Concord Records)
- Passport to the Heart (Concord Records)
- Guitarra Latina Romántica (JLM)

=== Singles ===
- "Playa de Los Lobos" (2004)
- "Lisalani"
- "Sukiyaki"
- "Ave Maria" (with Lisa Linsky)
- "Kalaupapa"
- "Christmas Time Is Here"

=== Video game and other releases ===
- Freddi Fish (music by George Sanger, arranged and recorded by Linsky)

=== Selected collaborations ===
- Mozart Variations – John Lee Sanders
- In the Enchanted Garden – Kevin Kern
- More Than Words – Kevin Kern
- The Winding Path – Kevin Kern
- Dancing With My Soul – Ayman (1994)
- Doorways – Ayman (1996)
- Tudo que arde, cura – Sérgio Augusto (recorded in São Paulo)
- Mood Swings – Jennifer Leitham
- I Have the Feeling I’ve Been Here Before – Jan Tober
- A Concord Jazz Christmas 2 (featuring Linsky’s recording of "The Little Drummer Boy")

== DVD ==
- Fingerstyle Jazz Guitar Solos (Mel Bay, 2003)
- Latin Jazz Guitar (Mel Bay, 2008)
