= Dave Buxton =

- Born: 2 April 1952 (age 73)
- Origin: Matlock, Derbyshire, England
- Genres: Jazz
- Occupation(s): Pianist; Composer
- Instrument: Piano
- Years active: 1971–present

Dave Buxton (born 2 April 1952) is an English jazz pianist and composer.

== Biography ==
Dave Buxton was born near Matlock, Derbyshire. Beginning in 1960, he studied classical music for eleven years. He performed on several editions of the BBC Radio 2 program Nightride and, between 1975 and 1977, he performed with the Chico Arnez Orchestra for live events as well as on radio and TV.

Between 1979 and 1986, Buxton worked with African band "Magoma", this experience influenced his compositional style. He formed a band called Rhythm Machine' to perform his own compositions, did some studio work with a film company and began teaching on a part-time basis.

Between 1986 and 1990 he performed regularly with saxophonist Andy Sheppard appearing on three award-winning albums and playing at hundreds of music festivals and venues.

In 1990 he formed a new band, "Pot Pourri", to perform and record new multi-culturally influenced jazz. Over the next decade he wrote and recorded with various bands and recorded several solo albums.

In 2002, he formed the Dave Buxton Trio with drummer Simon Gore and bass player Pete Maxfield, both of whom he met during his time playing with Andy Sheppard. In 2004, they released their first album, Mode Swings, described as "cerebral" and "poetic" by the BBC.

== Recordings ==
- A (album), Andy Sheppard (1987)
- Introductions in the Dark (album), Andy Sheppard (1989)
- Soft on the Inside (album), Andy Sheppard (1990)
- Bright Moments (album), Andy Sheppard (1990)
- Colours of Africa (album), Pot Pourri (1990)
- "Can You Handle It" (single), DNA featuring Sharon Redd (1992)
- Hide and Seek (album), Dave Buxton (1994)
- Law and Disorder (album), Dave Buxton (1998)
- Melting Pot (album), Dave Buxton (1999)
- Love to Ludwig (album), Dave Buxton (2000)
- Global Journey (album), Dave Buxton (2000)
- Reflections (album), Dave Buxton (2000)
- One and Only You (album), Ben (2002)
- Mode Swings (album), Dave Buxton Trio (2004)
