= For the Moment (Renee Rosnes album) =

Studio album by Renee Rosnes
- Released: October 1990
- Recorded: February 15–16, 1990; New York City
- Genre: Jazz
- Label: Blue Note

Renee Rosnes chronology
Renee Rosnes (1990)	For the Moment (1990)	Without Words (1992)

For the Moment is an album by Canadian jazz pianist Renee Rosnes which was released in 1990 by Blue Note Records. It won the 1992 Juno Award for Best Jazz Album.

== Track listings ==
No.	Title	Music	Length
1.	"Summer Night"	Harry Warren	8:28
2.	"For The Moment"	Renee Rosnes	9:23
3.	"Four In One"	Thelonious Monk	7:16
4.	"Malaga Moon"	Renee Rosnes	5:41
5.	"Nemesis"	Renee Rosnes	6:11
6.	"Thinking To Myself"	Walt Weiskopf	8:00
7.	"The Organ Grinder"	Woody Shaw	6:21
8.	"Homeward"	Renee Rosnes	7:36
