= Brad Upton (comedian) =

American stand-up comedian

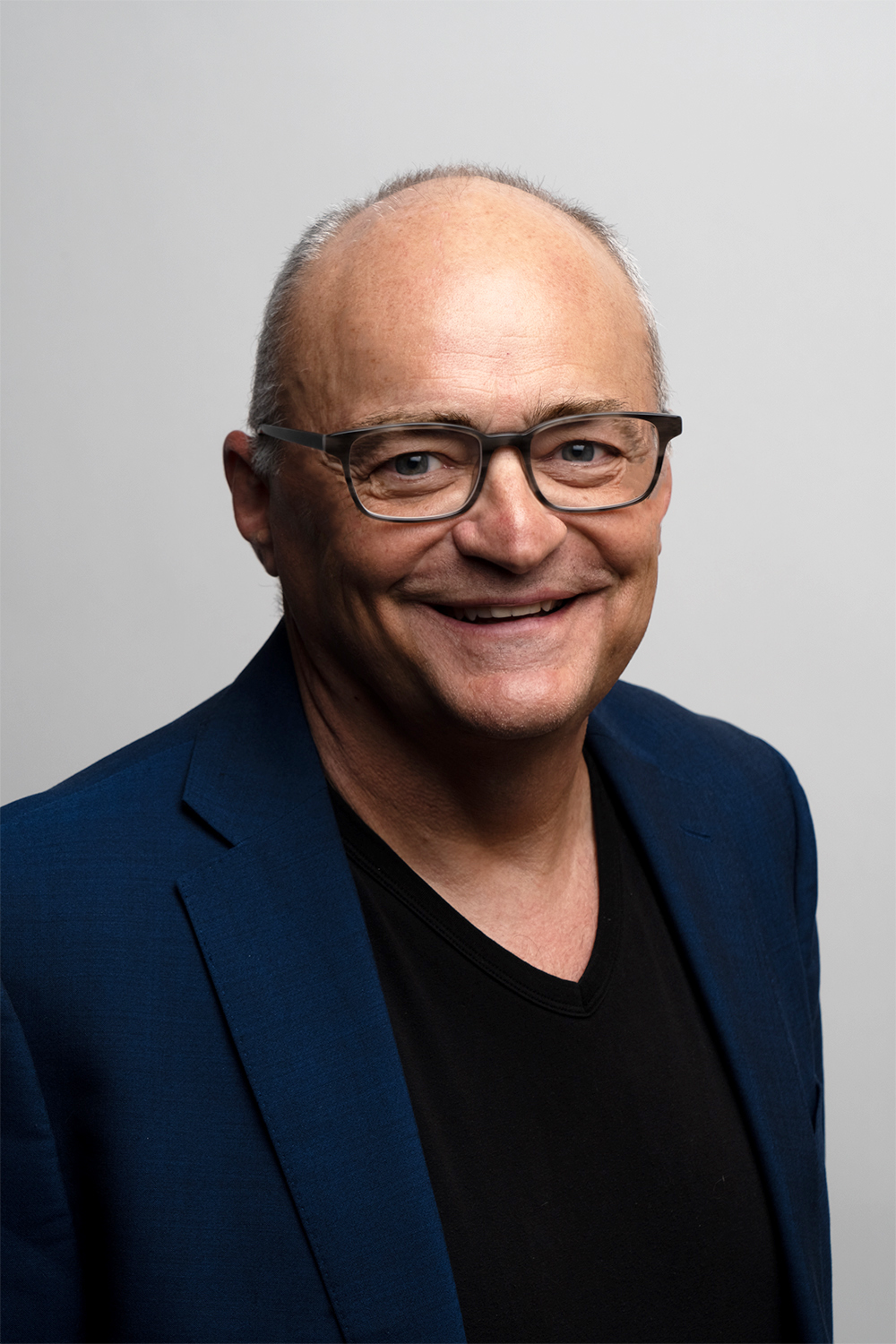
- Born: Brad Upton; Richland, Washington, United States
- Education: Spokane Community College; University of Montana; Eastern Washington University
- Occupations: Comedian, track coach
- Years active: 1984–present

Brad Upton (born 1955/1956) is an American stand-up comedian based in Seattle, Washington. He is known for his stand-up special produced by Dry Bar Comedy, and for performing with other acts including singer Johnny Mathis and comedian Joan Rivers. Upton has also performed at the Grand Ole Opry since 2019.

== Career ==
=== Comedy ===
In 1984, Upton performed for the first time at an open-mic at the Comedy Underground in Seattle. After seeing his performance, comedy promoter Laura Crocker invited him to compete in the Seattle International Comedy Competition. Although he did not win the competition, he quit working as a schoolteacher two years later to pursue comedy full time.

Over the course of his career, Upton has performed over 6,000 shows worldwide. He is a previous winner of the Las Vegas Comedy Festival. He was an opening comedian for Johnny Mathis from 2008 until Mathis' retirement from touring in 2025. He has also opened for the late comedian Joan Rivers. Upton has been seen in concert with Smokey Robinson, Kenny Rogers, Dolly Parton, Glen Campbell, and Pam Tillis. Upton has also performed at the MGM in Macau, in Israel in 2014 as part of the Comedy for Koby Mandell Foundation benefit.

In June 2018, a video clip of Upton's stand-up produced by Dry Bar Comedy was posted online. It became a viral video and reached 36 million views in ten days. He made his Grand Ole Opry debut in 2019.

Upton performed on an episode of the CBS talk show The Talk, which aired on May 17, 2024. He also performed at Caesar's Palace as part of the HBO Comedy Festival.

=== Track & Field ===
From 1980 to 1986, Upton was a track coach for Pasco High School.

Upton volunteered as an assistant track coach at the University of Washington from 1988 to 1994, and a full-time assistant coach from 1994 to 1997. From 2007 to 2022, Upton was the hurdles coach for Shorecrest High School’s track and field team. While coaching for the Washington Huskies, he placed athletes in the NCAA finals and US Olympic Trials.

== Personal life ==
Upton suffered a heart attack in 2022. Upton is married to his wife Julie with whom he has two children. He currently lives in Lake Forest Park, Washington.
