= Sue Keller =

American pianist and singer

- Born: July 7, 1952 (age 73); Allentown, Pennsylvania, U.S.
- Genres: Ragtime
- Occupations: Pianist, singer

Sue Keller (born July 7, 1952 in Allentown, Pennsylvania) is an American ragtime pianist and singer, who has released several albums. As a child, she had flute and singing lessons, and also played guitar. She attended DePauw University. She played professionally in various styles before settling on ragtime and old forms of jazz. She founded the publishing firm Ragtime Press and the record label HVR in 1992.

Keller was a contestant on the quiz show Jeopardy! in 1997, winning three games and $28,400. She was the festival music director for the Scott Joplin International Ragtime Foundation from 2003 through 2009 and was awarded the foundation's 2010 Friend of Ragtime Award.

== Discography ==
Year recorded	Title	Label	Notes
1992?	Some of My Best Friends		
1992?	Kellerized	Ragtime Press	Solo piano
1993?	Ol' Muddy	Ragtime Press	Solo piano
1993?	Nola	Ragtime Press	Solo piano; Keller adds vocals on some tracks
1994?	Ragtime Sue	Ragtime Press	Solo piano; Keller adds vocals on some tracks
1997?	I Got What It Takes	Ragtime Press	Solo piano; Keller adds vocals on some tracks
1999?	Those Irresistible Blues		Solo piano; Keller adds vocals on some tracks
2001?	Wild Women Don't Have the Blues		Solo piano and vocals
2002?	She Loved Christmas		
2005?	My Reindeer Don't Like to Fly		Some tracks with background vocals, guitar, drums
2005?	a/k/a Charles Johnson		Solo piano
2005?	A Little Lost Lamb		
2006?	Ragtime Reflections		
2007?	Live in Kalamazoo		
