= Tanglewood Jazz Festival =

Coordinates: 42°20′49.7″N 73°18′23.8″W

The Tanglewood Jazz Festival was a summer music festival, featuring contemporary jazz artists. In 2012, the event was cancelled. It was held every year on Friday, Saturday, and Sunday of Labor Day weekend, in Lenox, Massachusetts. The festival was held since the early 1990s, at Tanglewood, which is an outdoor festival grounds, and the summer home of the Boston Symphony Orchestra during June, July, and August, and given over to the jazz festival on the final weekend of the season.

Friday night's concert by tradition featured Latin jazz music. Saturday afternoon usually featured pianist Marian McPartland and her guest, and also another concert as well. Saturday night usually featured the contemporary greats and is held in the main venue, known as the "shed". Sunday featured two concerts, one in the afternoon, and on in the evening, often featuring Dave Brubeck.

Artists who appeared include Miles Davis, Diana Krall, Wynton Marsalis, Natalie Cole, Ahmad Jamal, Donal Fox, Nancy Wilson, Roy Haynes, Roy Hargrove, Jimmy Smith, Freddie Hubbard, Ray Charles, Hiromi Uehara, and many more.

The festival is known for its contributions to jazz culture.

== See also ==
- Tanglewood Music Festival
