= Life on Earth (Renee Rosnes album) =

Studio album by Renee Rosnes
- Released: 2001
- Genre: Jazz
- Length: 53:32
- Label: Blue Note

Renee Rosnes chronology
With a Little Help from My Friends (2001)	Life on Earth (2001)	Renee Rosnes and the Danish Radio Big Band (2003)

Professional ratings
Review scores
Source	Rating
The Penguin Guide to Jazz Recordings	3/4 stars

Life on Earth is an album by Canadian jazz pianist Renee Rosnes which was released in 2001 by Blue Note Records. It won the 2003 Juno Award for Traditional Jazz Album of the Year.

== Track listing ==
No.	Title	Music	Length
1.	"Empress Afternoon"	Renee Rosnes	5:28
2.	"Senegal Son"	Renee Rosnes	6:02
3.	"The Ballad of the Sad Young Men"	Tommy Wolf	5:15
4.	"Icelight"	Renee Rosnes	7:38
5.	"Gabriola Passage"	Renee Rosnes	6:16
6.	"The Quiet Earth"	Renee Rosnes	5:08
7.	"Hanuman"	Renee Rosnes	5:41
8.	"Nana"	Renee Rosnes	5:30
9.	"The Call of Triton"	Renee Rosnes	6:34
