= Virginia Mayhew =

- Born: May 14, 1959 (age 66); San Francisco, California, United States
- Genres: Jazz
- Occupations: Musician, composer, arranger, bandleader, educator
- Instrument: Saxophone
- Labels: Renma Recordings
- Website: Renma Records artist page

Virginia Mayhew (born May 14, 1959, San Francisco, California) is a New York-based saxophonist, composer and bandleader. She has led her own groups for over 25 years, and currently leads several quartets, a quintet, and a septet.

Mayhew has worked with such artists as Earl ‘Fatha’ Hines, Cab Calloway, Frank Zappa, James Brown, Norman Simmons, Al Grey, Junior Mance, Joe Williams, Chico O'Farrill, Marlena Shaw, Toshiko Akiyoshi, Kenny Barron, Leon Parker, Ingrid Jensen, Claudio Roditi, Nnenna Freelon, and many others.

Mayhew has been a guest on Marian McPartland’s Piano Jazz, the featured artist on NPR’s All Things Considered, and has appeared twice on Jazz Set with Dee Dee Bridgewater. In 2007 she was selected by Down Beat magazine as a "Rising Star" on soprano saxophone, and has been the subject of several feature articles in Down Beat, Jazztimes and Jazziz magazines.

Her 2012 recording, Mary Lou Williams – The Next 100 Years, was selected by Down Beat as one of the Best New Releases of 2012 and by Rhapsody as one of the ten best new CDs of 2012.

Mayhew has performed in many of New York City's major jazz venues, including Carnegie Hall, Lincoln Center, Town Hall, Jazz Standard, the Blue Note, Sweet Basil, and Small's, and has performed throughout the United States, Europe, Australia, Southeast Asia, as well as in the Caribbean and Bermuda. Mayhew has been featured as a leader at many jazz festivals, both within the United States and abroad, and has traveled twice as a representative of the United States as a Jazz Ambassador.

Mayhew earned a black belt in Seido Karate, and is seen engaging in the sport on the cover of her fifth album, Sandan Shuffle. "My karate studies not only inspired the cover photo, but also the title track," she explained in an interview. "Sandan is 3rd level."

== Discography ==
- Mary Lou Williams – The Next 100 Years (Renma, 2011)
- A Simple Thank You (Renma, 2008)
- Sandan Shuffle (Renma, 2005)
- Phantoms (Renma, 2003)
- No Walls (Renma, 2000)
- Nini Green (Chiaroscuro, 1997)
