= Uffe Markussen =

Danish jazz reedist (born 1952)

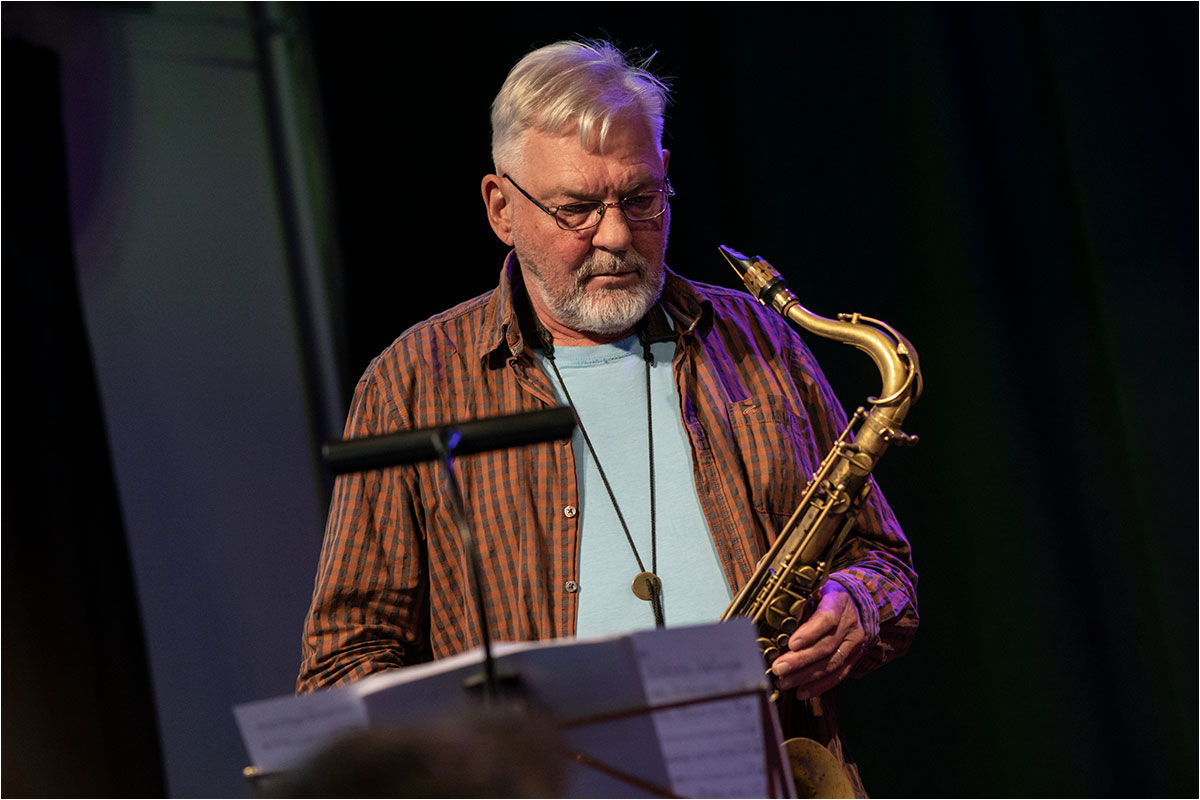
Aarhus Jazz Festival 2022 Foto Hreinn Gudlaugsson

Uffe Eskild Markussen (born September 19, 1952, Frederikshavn) is a Danish jazz reedist, who plays primarily tenor saxophone and bass clarinet.

Markussen was a student at the Royal Danish Academy of Music and played in his early career with an ensemble called Tømmermændene. He co-founded groups with Jorgen Emborg, Jens Winther, and Marilyn Mazur in the late 1970s and early 1980s, and worked with other groups such as Blast, Instant Breakfast, and Santa Cruz. In 1985 he began playing in Niels Jorgen Steen's group A-Team, and founded the six-piece ensemble Orbit the following year. In 1989 he began playing with the Radioens Big Band and in 1991 with Avantgarden Party. Other associations include performing or recording with Frans Bak, Ben Besiakov, Joaquin Chacon, Trine Dansgaard, Pierre Dorge, Kjeld Ipsen, Fredrik Lundin, and Niels-Henning Ørsted Pedersen.
