= Brad Upton (musician) =

American jazz musician

- Born: 1952 (age 73–74); Ann Arbor, Michigan, U.S.
- Genre: Jazz
- Instruments: Trumpet

Brad Upton (born 1952) is an American jazz trumpet player.

== Early life and education ==
Upton was born in Ann Arbor, Michigan, and raised in Oak Ridge, Tennessee. As a child, he studied piano and trumpet. He attended the Berklee College of Music from 1969 to 1971.

== Career ==
After leaving Berklee, Upton moved to New York City, where he worked as an arranger and composer for Lionel Hampton, Chet Baker, the Bob Mover Quintet, and Tito Puente. Upton moved to Boulder, Colorado, in 1983. In Boulder, Upton studied meditation practices under Chögyam Trungpa. He received two grants from the Boulder Arts Commission, which he used to continue composing jazz music.

== Discography ==
- Black Orchid (1999)
- Sweetness (1999)
- Dragon (2002)
- Lionheart (2003)
