= Akio Sasajima =

Japanese jazz guitarist (born 1952)

Akio Sasajima (笹島 明夫, Sasajima Akio) (born 1952) is a jazz guitarist born in Japan and currently based in Sapporo, Japan. His playing style incorporates bebop, hard bop, and jazz fusion. He recorded several albums as a leader for Muse and Enja in the late 1980s and early 1990s.

== Discography ==
- Akio with Joe Henderson (Muse, 1988) – with Joe Henderson
- Time Remembered (Muse, 1989)
- Humpty Dumpty (BRC, 1990) – with Joe Henderson
- Akioustically Sound (Muse, 1991)
- Time Remembered (Muse, 1993)
- Akioustically Sound (Muse, 1995) – with Ron Carter
- Two for the Muse (Pony Canyon, 2006)
- Images Of Lennon/McCartney (Tonegold, 2015)
