= 1964 in jazz =

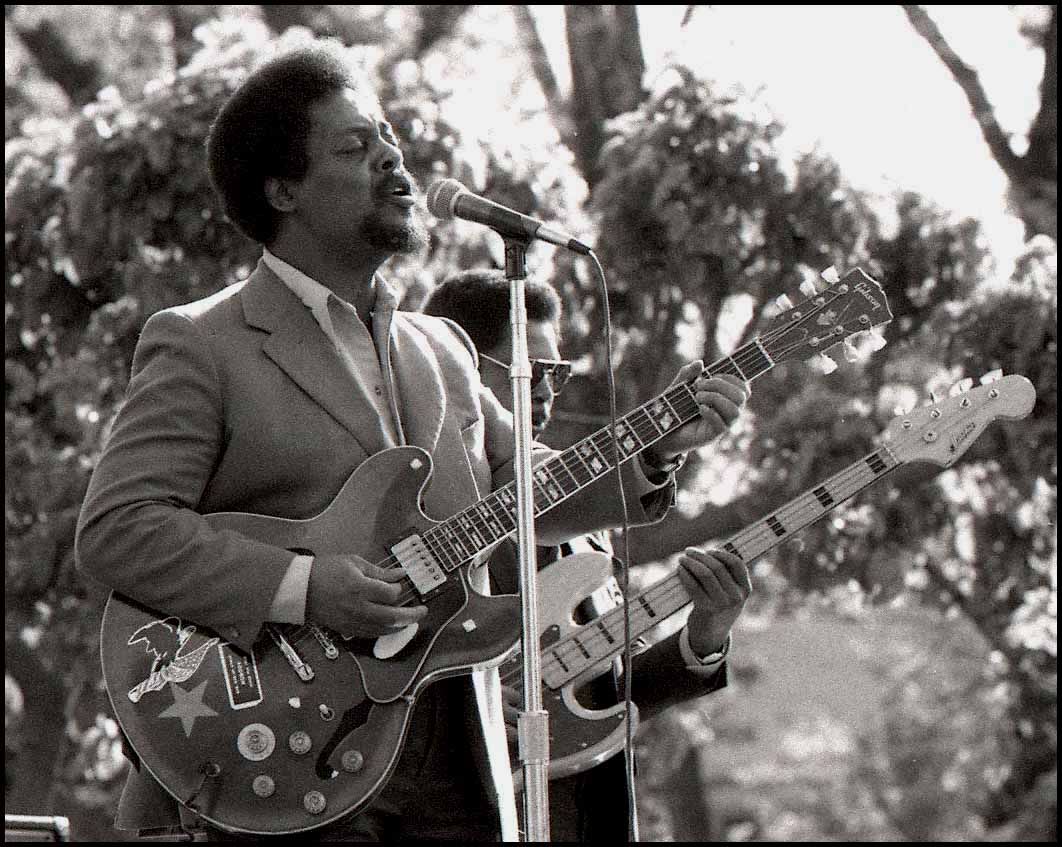
- Luther Tucker, December 12, at the 1964 Fountain blues Festival San Jose Ca,
- Decade: 1960s in jazz
- Music: 1964 in music
- Standards: List of post-1950 jazz standards
- See also: 1963 in jazz – 1965 in jazz

This is a timeline documenting events of Jazz in the year 1964.

== Events ==
=== July ===
- 2 – The 11th Newport Jazz Festival started in Newport, Rhode Island (July 2 – 5).

== Album releases ==
- Albert Ayler: Witches and Devils
- John Coltrane: Crescent
- Eric Dolphy: Out to Lunch!
- Guenter Hampel: Heartplants
- Herbie Hancock: Empyrean Isles
- Joe Henderson: "Our Thing (album)"
- Andrew Hill: Judgment!
- Andrew Hill: Black Fire
- Freddie Hubbard
  - Breaking Point
  - "Doin' the Thang!"
  - "The Body & the Soul"
- Lee Morgan: The Sidewinder
- Lee Morgan: Search For The New Land
- New York Art Quartet: New York Art Quartet
- Anita O'Day: Incomparable!
- Duke Pearson: Wahoo!
- Oscar Peterson
  - Canadiana Suite
  - "The Oscar Peterson Trio Plays"
  - Trio Plus One
  - "We Get Requests"
- André Previn: My Fair Lady
- Shirley Scott: Blue Flames
- Tony Scott: Music for Zen Meditation
- Wayne Shorter: JuJu
- Ben Webster: See You at the Fair
- Tony Williams: Life Time
- Larry Young: Into Somethin'
- Denny Zeitlin
  - Carnival
  - Cathexis

== Deaths ==
January

- 4 – Artie Bernstein, American upright bassist (born 1909).
- 5 – Cecil Scott, American clarinetist, tenor saxophonist, and bandleader (born 1905).
- 9 – Big Boy Goudie, American saxophonist (born 1899).
- 15 – Jack Teagarden, American trombonist and singer (born 1905).

February

- 9 – Willie Bryant, American bandleader, vocalist, and disc jockey (born 1908).

May

- 1 – Håkan von Eichwald, Finnish-Swedish bandleader and conductor (born 1908).
- 7 – Joe Maini, American alto saxophonist (born 1930).

June

- 29 – Eric Dolphy, American alto saxophonist, flautist, and bass clarinetist (born 1928).

July

- 10 – Joe Haymes, American drummer, pianist, bandleader, and arranger (born 1907).

October

- 7 – Nick Travis, American trumpeter (born 1925).
- 8 – Conrad Gozzo, American trumpeter (born 1922).
- 15 – Cole Porter, American composer and songwriter (born 1891).

November

- 5 – Buddy Cole, American pianist and orchestra leader (born 1916).
- 19 – Vi Burnside, American saxophonist and bandleader (born 1915).
- 30 – Don Redman, American arranger, bandleader, saxophonist, and clarinetist (born 1900).

December

- 11 – Sam Cooke, American singer, songwriter, and entrepreneur (born 1931).
- 14 – Francisco Canaro, Uruguayan violinist and tango orchestra leader (born 1888).
- 28 – Dave Bowman, American pianist (born 1914).

== Births ==
January

- 18 – Andy Panayi, British saxophonist and flautist.
- 27 – Trond Sverre Hansen, Norwegian drummer.

February

- 1 – Bugge Wesseltoft, Norwegian pianist and keyboardist.
- 9 – Liane Carroll, English vocalist, pianist, and keyboardist.
- 20 – Iain Ballamy, British composer, and soprano, alto and tenor saxophonist.
- 29 – Martin France, English drummer.

March

- 10 – Neneh Cherry, Swedish singer-songwriter.
- 13 – Reidar Skår, Norwegian keyboardist, composer, and music producer.
- 18 – Courtney Pine, British saxophonist.
- 30 – Tracy Chapman, American singer-songwriter and guitarist.

April

- 13 – Tetuzi Akiyama, Japanese guitarist, violinist, and instrument-maker.
- 16 – Esbjörn Svensson, Swedish pianist, e.s.t (died 2008).
- 22 – Johannes Eick, Norwegian bassist.
- 26 – Rebecka Törnqvist, Swedish singer.

May

- 4 – Terje Isungset, Norwegian drummer and percussionist.
- 13 – Harald Devold, Norwegian saxophonist (died 2016).
- 31 – Carl Petter Opsahl, Norwegian saxophonist, clarinetist, and journalist.

June

- 8 – Fabrizio Cassol, Belgian saxophonist.
- 9 – Wayman Tisdale, American basketball player and bass guitarist (died 2009).
- 10 – Jimmy Chamberlin, American drummer, The Smashing Pumpkins.
- 11 – Antti Sarpila, Finnish clarinetist.
- 13 – Helge Lilletvedt, Norwegian pianist.
- 21 – Philippe Aerts, Belgian upright bassist.
- 28 – Steve Williamson, English saxophonist and composer.

July

- 13 – Brent Fischer, American bass guitarist and percussionist.
- 15 – Tobias Delius, English tenor saxophonist and clarinetist.

August

- 10 – Kåre Kolve, Norwegian saxophonist.
- 13 – Werner Neumann, German guitarist.
- 21 – Jorge Rossy, Spanish drummer, pianist and vibraphonist.
- 28 – Peter Washington, American upright bassist.

September

- 1 – Dave O'Higgins, English saxophonist and composer.
- 9 – Cæcilie Norby, Danish singer.
- 11 – Victor Wooten, American bassist.
- 16 – Phillip Bent, English flautist.
- 23 – Yutaka Shiina, Japanese pianist and composer.
- 25 – Barbara Dennerlein, German organist.

October

- 4 – Robert Hurst, American bassist.
- 27 – Scotty Barnhart, American trumpeter, Count Basie Orchestra.
- 29 – Mats Gustafsson, Swedish saxophonist.

November

- 16 – Diana Krall, Canadian pianist and singer.
- 19 – Vincent Herring, American saxophonist and flautist.
- 28 – Jesse Cook, Canadian guitarist.

December

- 5 – Arve Furset, Norwegian pianist and keyboardist.
- 12 – Mark Mondesir, English drummer.
- 29 – Ramón Valle, Cuban pianist and composer.

Unknown date

- Benita Haastrup, Danish drummer, percussionist, educator, and composer.
- Dennis Rollins, English trombonist and bandleader.

== See also ==
- 1960s in jazz
- List of years in jazz
- 1964 in music

== Bibliography ==
- The New Real Book, Volume I. Sher Music. 1988. ISBN 0-9614701-4-3.
- The New Real Book, Volume II. Sher Music. 1991. ISBN 0-9614701-7-8.
- The New Real Book, Volume III. Sher Music. 1995. ISBN 1-883217-30-X.
- The Real Book, Volume I (6th ed.). Hal Leonard. 2004. ISBN 0-634-06038-4.
- The Real Book, Volume II (2nd ed.). Hal Leonard. 2007. ISBN 978-1-4234-2452-9.
- The Real Book, Volume III (2nd ed.). Hal Leonard. 2006. ISBN 0-634-06136-4.
- The Real Jazz Book. Warner Bros. ISBN 978-91-85041-36-7.
- The Real Vocal Book, Volume I. Hal Leonard. 2006. ISBN 0-634-06080-5.
