= 1957 in jazz =

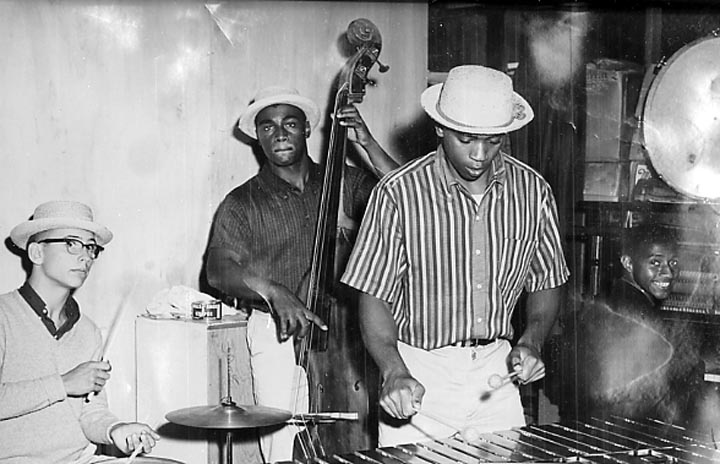
- The Jazz Monitors 1957 – from left, Roger Dawson, drums, Herbie Lewis, bass, Bobby Hutcherson, vibraphone, Nat Brown, piano
- Decade: 1950s in jazz
- Music: 1957 in music
- Standards: List of post-1950 jazz standards
- See also: 1956 in jazz – 1958 in jazz

This is a timeline documenting events of Jazz in the year 1957.

== Events ==
=== June ===
- 25 – Ella Fitzgerald started recording the album The Irving Berlin Songbook (June 25 – October 17).
  - She won at the 1st Grammy Awards in the category Best Jazz Performance, Individual for this album.

=== July ===
- 4 – The 5th Newport Jazz Festival started in Newport, Rhode Island (July 4 – 7).

=== Unknown dates ===
- Carla Bley (born Borg in 1936) was married to Paul Bley.

== Album releases ==
- Art Blakey: Orgy In Rhythm
- Kenny Burrell: All Day Long
- John Coltrane: Blue Train
- Miles Davis: Miles Ahead
- Curtis Fuller: The Opener
- Johnny Griffin: A Blowin' Session
- Milt Jackson: Soul Brothers
- Jay Jay Johnson: Blue Trombone
- Stan Kenton: Kenton with Voices
- Yusef Lateef: Jazz Mood
- John Lewis: The John Lewis Piano
- Herbie Mann: Flute Soufflé
- Charles Mingus: Tijuana Moods
- Hank Mobley: Hank Mobley Quintet
- Thelonious Monk: Brilliant Corners
- Art Pepper: Meets the Rhythm Section
- Tito Puente: Top Percussion
- Max Roach: Jazz in ¾ Time
- Sonny Rollins:
  - Way Out West
  - The Sound of Sonny
- Art Taylor: Taylor's Wailers
- Ben Webster:
  - Soulville
  - Tenor Giants

== Deaths ==
January

- 9 – Cripple Clarence Lofton, American boogie-woogie pianist and singer (born 1887).
- 18 – George Girard, New Orleans trumpeter (born 1930).
- 20 – Dean Benedetti, Italian-American saxophonist (born 1922).

February

- 7 – Sonny Parker, American singer, dancer, and drummer (born 1925).

March

- 12 – Robert Graettinger, American composer (born 1923).
- 25 – Fud Livingston, American clarinetist, saxophonist, arranger and composer (born 1906).

June

- 12 – Jimmy Dorsey, American clarinetist, saxophonist, trumpeter, composer, big-band leader (born 1904).
- 25 – Curtis Mosby, American jazz drummer, bandleader, and businessman (born 1888).

July

- 16 – Serge Chaloff, American baritone saxophonist (born 1923).

August

- 2 – Joe Shulman, American upright bassist (born 1923).
- 28 – Erik Tuxen, Danish big-band leader, composer, and arranger (born 1902).

September

- 12 – Louis Mitchell, American drummer and bandleader (born 1885).

October

- 9 – Carroll Dickerson, American violinist and bandleader (born 1895).
- 23 – Abe Lyman, American bandleader (born 1897).

November

- 17 – Wooden Joe Nicholas, American trumpeter and cornetist (born 1883).
- 26 – Jack Gardner, American pianist (born 1903).
- 30 – Richard McPartland, American violin, banjo, and guitar player (born 1905).

December

- 20 – Walter Page, American multi-instrumentalist and bandleader (born 1900).
- 29 – Ernie Henry, American saxophonist (born 1926).

Unknown date

- He Dasha, Chinese musician (born 1897).

== Births ==
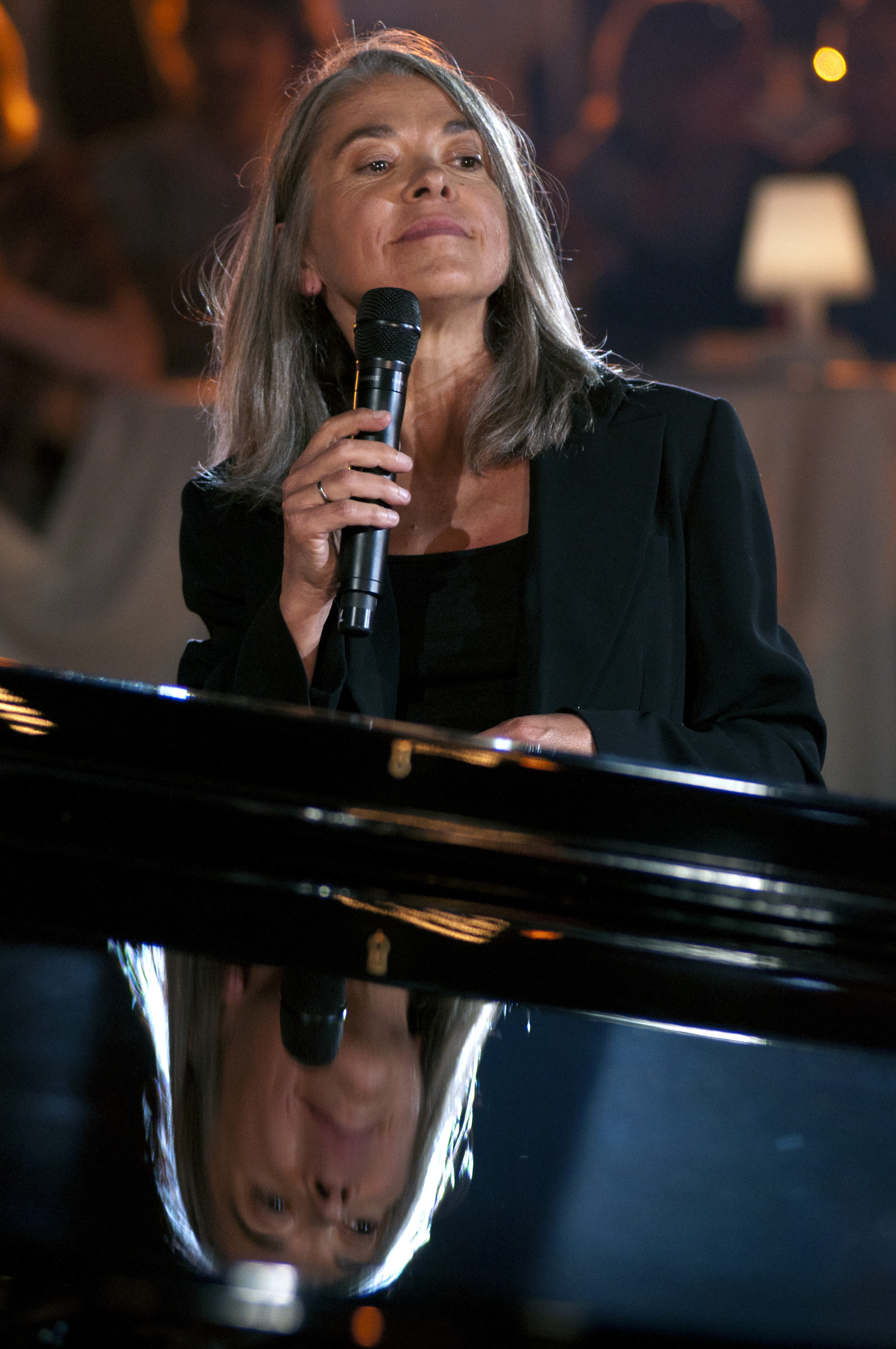
Sophia Domancich 2011.

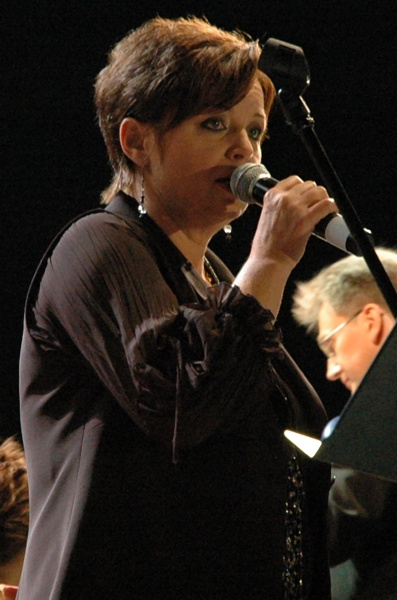
Hanna Banaszak 2007.

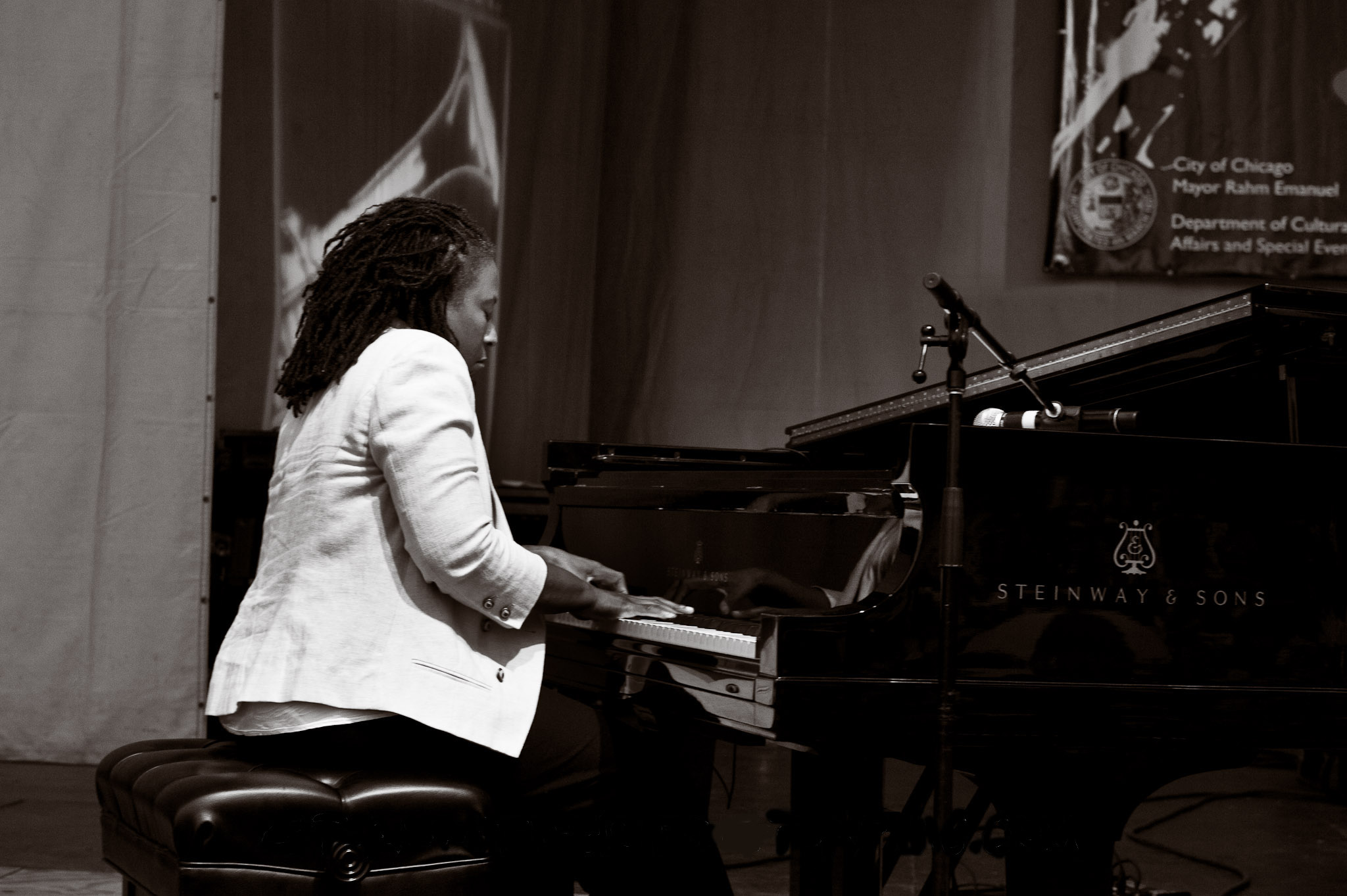
Geri Allen 2011.

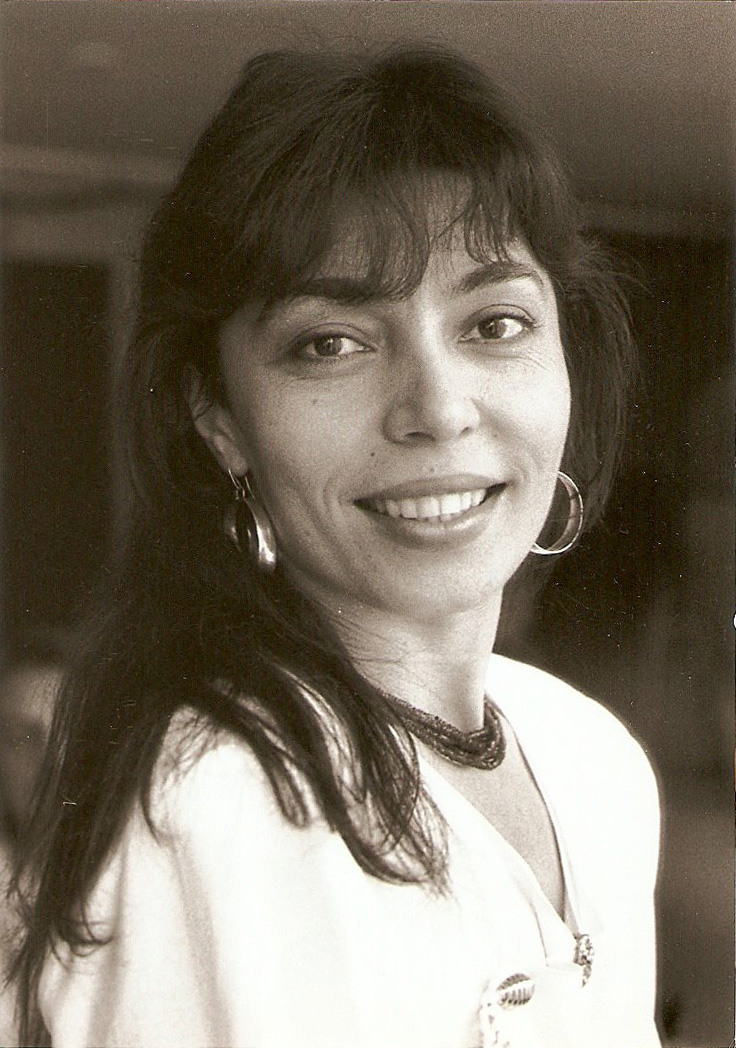
Anca Parghel 2010.

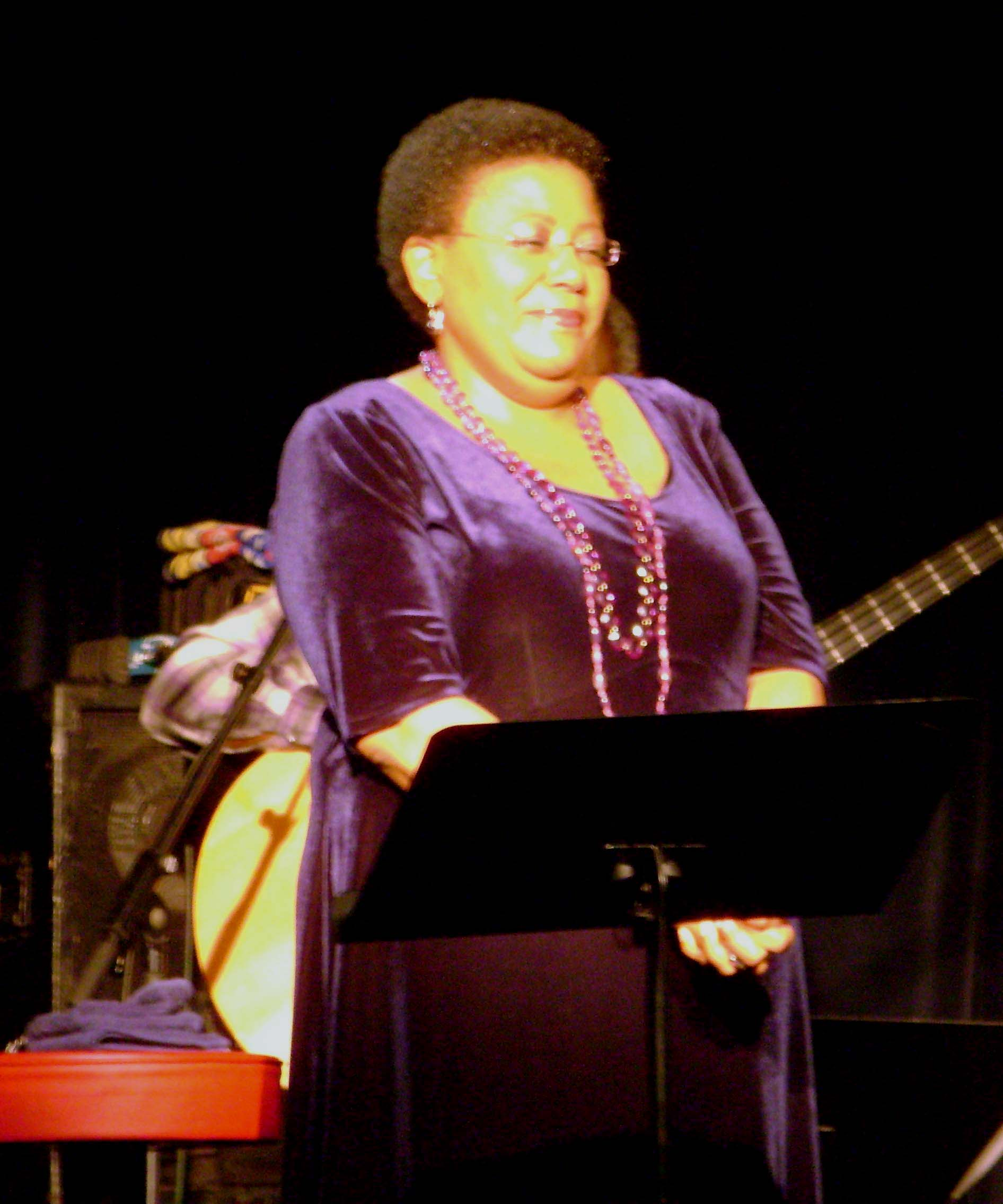
Sibongile Khumalo 2008.

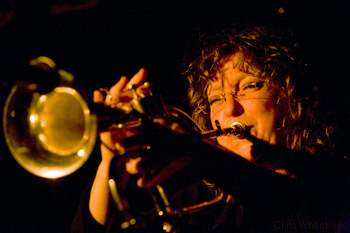
Pamela Fleming 2011.

January

- 1 – Issei Noro, Japanese guitarist and composer, Casiopea.
- 5
  - Maartin Allcock, British multi-instrumentalist, Fairport Convention, Jethro Tull (died 2018).
  - Myra Melford, American pianist and composer.
- 7 – Clarence Seay, American upright bassist and composer.
- 18 – Bert Joris, Belgian trumpeter, composer, and arranger.
- 20 – Andy Sheppard, British saxophonist and composer.
- 25 – Sophia Domancich, French pianist and composer.

February

- 6
  - Ferenc Snétberger, Hungarian guitarist.
  - Faith Nolan, American singer-songwriter and guitarist.
  - Simon Phillips, English drummer, songwriter, and producer.
- 11 – Oddmund Finnseth, Norwegian upright bassist, composer, and music teacher.
- 13 – Inger Marie Gundersen, Norwegian singer and composer.
- 14 – Tommy Campbell, American drummer.
- 15 – Herlin Riley, American drummer.
- 25 – Aage Tanggaard, Danish drummer and record producer.
- 26 – Ian Villafana, American guitarist and songwriter.

March

- 3 – Mike Smith, American saxophonist.
- 8
  - Billy Childs, American pianist.
  - William Edward Childs, American composer and pianist.
- 9 – Thomas Chapin, American composer, saxophonist, and multi-instrumentalist (died 1998).
- 10 – Mino Cinelu, French drummer.
- 14 – Vanessa Rubin, American vocalist and composer.
- 30 – Dave Stryker, American guitarist.

April

- 1 – Matt Kendrick, American upright bassist and composer.
- 4 – Tom McClung, American pianist and composer (died 2017).
- 24 – Hanna Banaszak, Polish singer and poet.
- 25 – Nestor Torres, Puerto Rican flautist.
- 28 – Adrian Utley, English guitarist and producer, Portishead.

May

- 2 – Markus Stockhausen, German trumpet player.
- 10 – Carleen Anderson, American singer.
- 11 – Manfred Hausleitner, Austrian drummer.
- 12 – Jason Kao Hwang, Chinese-American violinist and composer.
- 14 – Martin Litton, British pianist.
- 29 – Lynne Arriale, American pianist.

June

- 2 – Bobby Sanabria, American drummer, percussionist, composer, and producer.
- 12 – Geri Allen, American pianist and composer (died 2017).
- 17 – Tom Varner, American hornist and composer.
- 20 – Rick Lazaroff, Canadian bassist.
- 24 – Luis Salinas, Argentine guitarist.
- 28 – Annette A. Aguilar, American percussionist, bandleader, and music educator.

July

- 7 – Hayes Greenfield, American saxophonist, composer, producer, filmmaker, bandleader, and educator.
- 12
  - Eddie Allen, American trumpeter and flugel hornist.
  - Fredrik Carl Størmer, Norwegian drummer.
- 18 – Lynn Seaton, American upright bassist.
- 21 – George Landress, American mixer, musical engineer, and producer.
- 22 – Harri Stojka, Viennese guitarist.
- 31 – Mamdouh Bahri, Tunisian guitarist.

August

- 4
  - Arto Tunçboyacıyan, Turkish-Armenian percussionist, vocalist, and duduk, sazabo, and bular player, Night Ark.
  - Jose Valdes, American pianist and bandleader.
- 9 – Danilo Rea, American pianist.
- 10 – Fred Ho, American baritone saxophonist, composer, bandleader (died 2014).
- 17 – Rabih Abou-Khalil, Lebanese oud player and composer.
- 24 – Steve Berry, English upright bassist, cellist, and violinist, Mike Westbrook Orchestra.
- 30 – Gerald Albright, American saxophonist and multi-instrumentalist.

September

- 7 – Anders Jormin, Swedish upright bassist and composer.
- 11 – James McBride, American writer and musician.
- 16 – Anca Parghel, Romanian singer (died 2008).
- 18
  - Emily Remler, American guitarist (died 1990).
  - John Fedchock, American trombonist, bandleader, and arranger.
- 19 – Tatsu Aoki, Japanese upright bassist and record producer.
- 24 – Sibongile Khumalo, South African singer.
- 25 – Barbara Lahr, German singer, composer, bassist, guitarist, and producer, De Phazz.
- 27 – Jerry Weldon, American tenor saxophonist.
- 28 – Ernst-Wiggo Sandbakk, Norwegian drummer.

October

- 3 – Bogdan Holownia, Polish pianist.
- 4
  - Yngve Moe, Norwegian bass guitarist Dance with a Stranger (died 2013).
  - Wolter Wierbos, Dutch trombonist.
- 5 – Clifton Anderson, American trombonist.
- 7 – Morten Halle, Norwegian saxophonist.
- 8 – Eerik Siikasaari, Finnish upright bassist, Trio Töykeät.
- 8 – Andrés Boiarsky, Argentine alto and tenor saxophonist.
- 10 – Pamela Fleming, American trumpeter, flugelhornist, and composer.
- 11 – George Letellier, American pianist and composer.
- 13 – Future Man, multi-instrumentalist, composer, and inventor, Béla Fleck and the Flecktones.
- 20 – Anouar Brahem, Tunisian oud player and composer.
- 21 – Ted Gioia, American jazz critic and music historian.
- 25 – Arthur Rhames, American guitarist, tenor saxophonist and pianist (died 1989).
- 27 – Manu Katché, French drummer and songwriter.

November

- 2 – Gebhard Ullmann, German flautist, saxophonist, and composer.
- 4
  - Éric Le Lann, French trumpeter.
  - Najee, American saxophonist and flautist.
- 13
  - Roger Ingram, American trumpet player, educator, and author.
  - Tetsuo Sakurai, Japanese bassist, Casiopea.
- 15 – Kevin Eubanks, American guitarist and composer.
- 27 – Judy Carmichael, American pianist and vocalist.
- 29 – Jennifer Batten, American guitarist.

December

- 1 – Chris Poland, American guitarist.
- 4 – Phillip Barham, American saxophonist.
- 10 – Paul Hardcastle, British composer, musician, producer, songwriter, radio presenter, and multi-instrumentalist
- 14 – Runar Tafjord, Norwegian French horn player.
- 19 – Eric Marienthal, American saxophonist
- 21 – Roberto Ottaviano, Italian saxophonist.
- 26 – Guy Barker, English trumpeter and composer.

Unknown date

- Jimmy Earl, American bass guitarist.
- John Kenny, British trombonist, actor, and composer.
- Ray Kennedy, American pianist (died 2015).
- Tom McDermott, pianist and composer.
- Tom Rainey, American drummer.

== See also ==
- 1950s in jazz
- List of years in jazz
- 1957 in music

== Bibliography ==
- The New Real Book, Volume I. Sher Music. 1988. ISBN 0-9614701-4-3.
- The New Real Book, Volume II. Sher Music. 1991. ISBN 0-9614701-7-8.
- The New Real Book, Volume III. Sher Music. 1995. ISBN 1-883217-30-X.
- The Real Book, Volume I (6th ed.). Hal Leonard. 2004. ISBN 0-634-06038-4.
- The Real Book, Volume II (2nd ed.). Hal Leonard. 2007. ISBN 978-1-4234-2452-9.
- The Real Book, Volume III (2nd ed.). Hal Leonard. 2006. ISBN 0-634-06136-4.
- The Real Jazz Book. Warner Bros. ISBN 978-91-85041-36-7.
- The Real Vocal Book, Volume I. Hal Leonard. 2006. ISBN 0-634-06080-5.
