= 1949 in jazz =

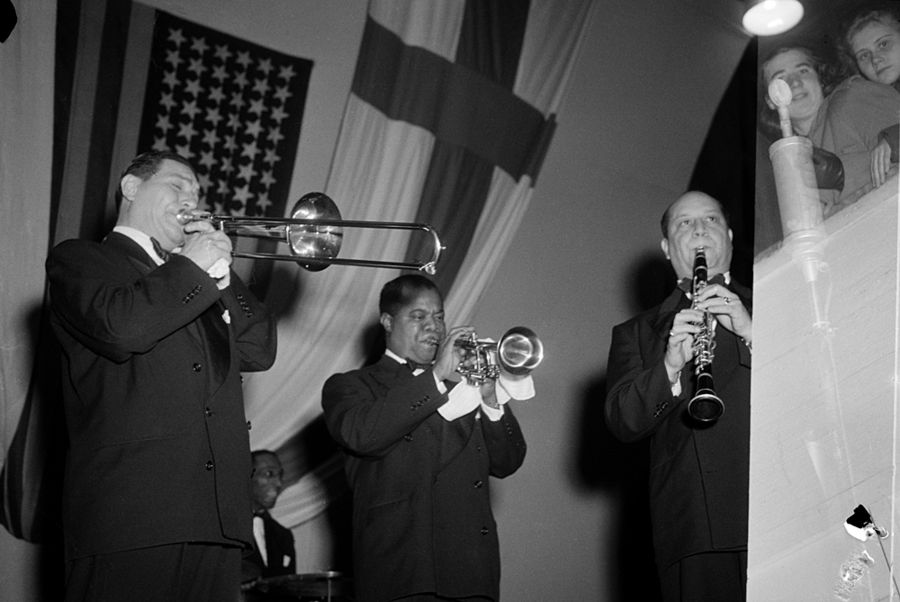
- Satchmo plays the trumpet in Töölö Sports Hall between two Finnish musicians, October 1949
- Decade: 1940s in jazz
- Music: 1949 in music
- Standards: List of 1940s jazz standards
- See also: 1948 in jazz – 1950 in jazz

This is a timeline documenting events of Jazz in the year 1949.

In 1949 Bebop dominates the scene, but Dixieland is still being played. Miles Davis makes the first recordings with other artists of what will be known as Cool Jazz. The first LPs are issued, as are the first 45s.

== Shows, movies and events ==
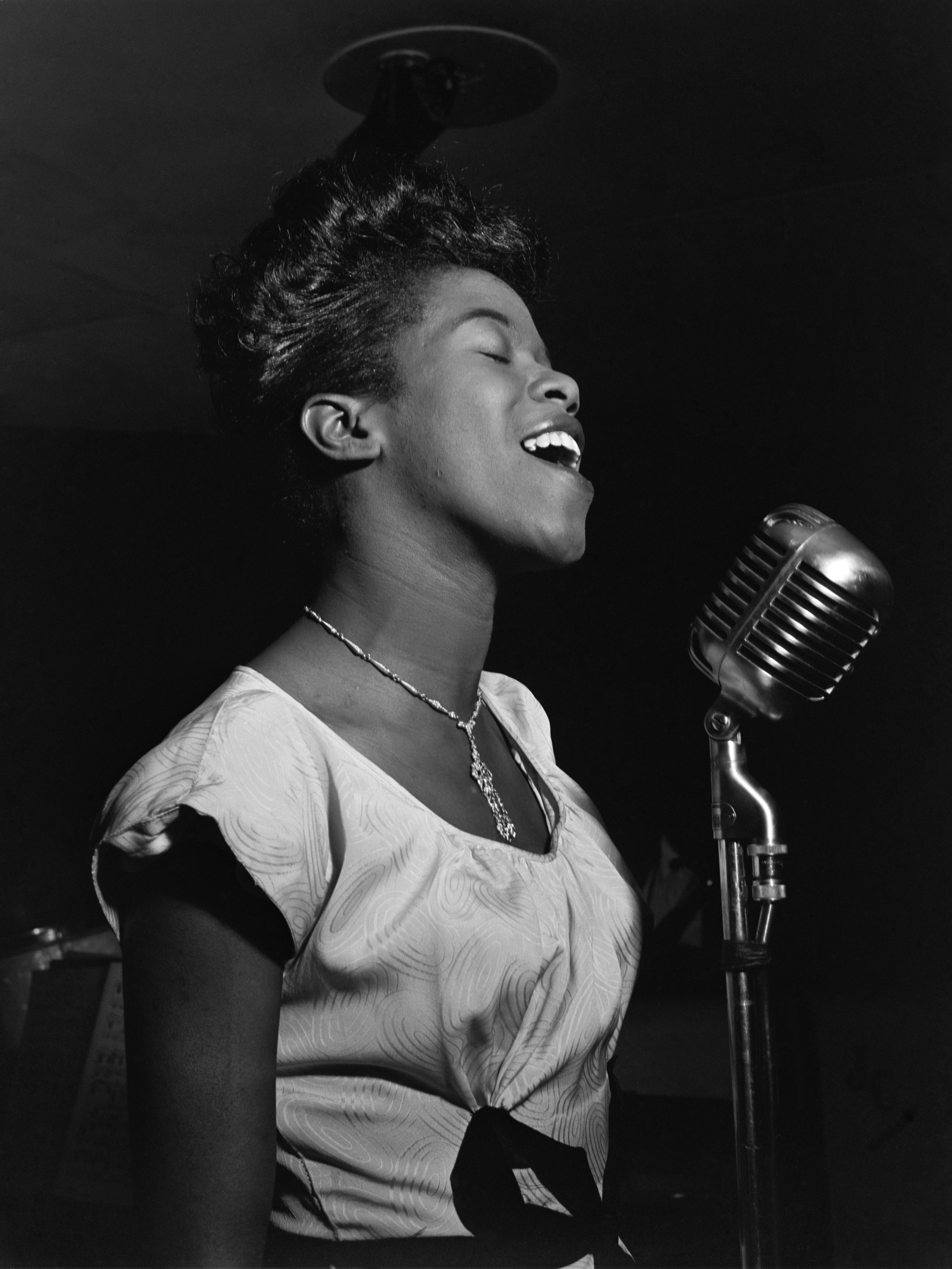
Sarah Vaughan

- Begone Dull Care is an animated film directed by Norman McLaren and Evelyn Lambart, giving a visual presentation of Oscar Peterson's jazz music.
- My Foolish Heart was a film starring Dana Andrews and Susan Hayward that was panned by the critics, but the title song "My Foolish Heart", written by singer Billie Holiday and sung by Martha Mears, was a hit and became a jazz standard.
- Sarah Vaughan made her first appearance with a symphony orchestra in a benefit for the Philadelphia Orchestra entitled "100 Men and a Girl."
- Al Jolson appeared in the film Jolson Sings Again, a sequel to the 1946 The Jolson Story.
- Dolly Rathebe's career was launched by an appearance as a nightclub singer in the British-produced movie Jim Comes To Jo'burg.
- Frank Sinatra co-starred with Gene Kelly in Take Me Out to the Ball Game.
- Lena Horne appeared in the movie Some of the Best.
- Liza Minnelli made her debut aged three in the movie In the Good Old Summertime.
- The musical Lost in the Stars premiered on Broadway.
- At a Jazz at the Philharmonic concert, Ray Brown first worked with the jazz pianist Oscar Peterson.
- Sonny Rollins made his first recording with Babs Gonzales.
- Fred Astaire and Ginger Rogers danced to the jazz standard "They Can't Take That Away from Me" in their last movie The Barkleys of Broadway.
- Waring's Pennsylvanians, a jazz – Dixieland band had their own TV show in 1949.
- Club openings included Birdland, founded by Monte Kay in New York City, the Lighthouse Café in Hermosa Beach, California and The Black Hawk in San Francisco.

== Recordings ==
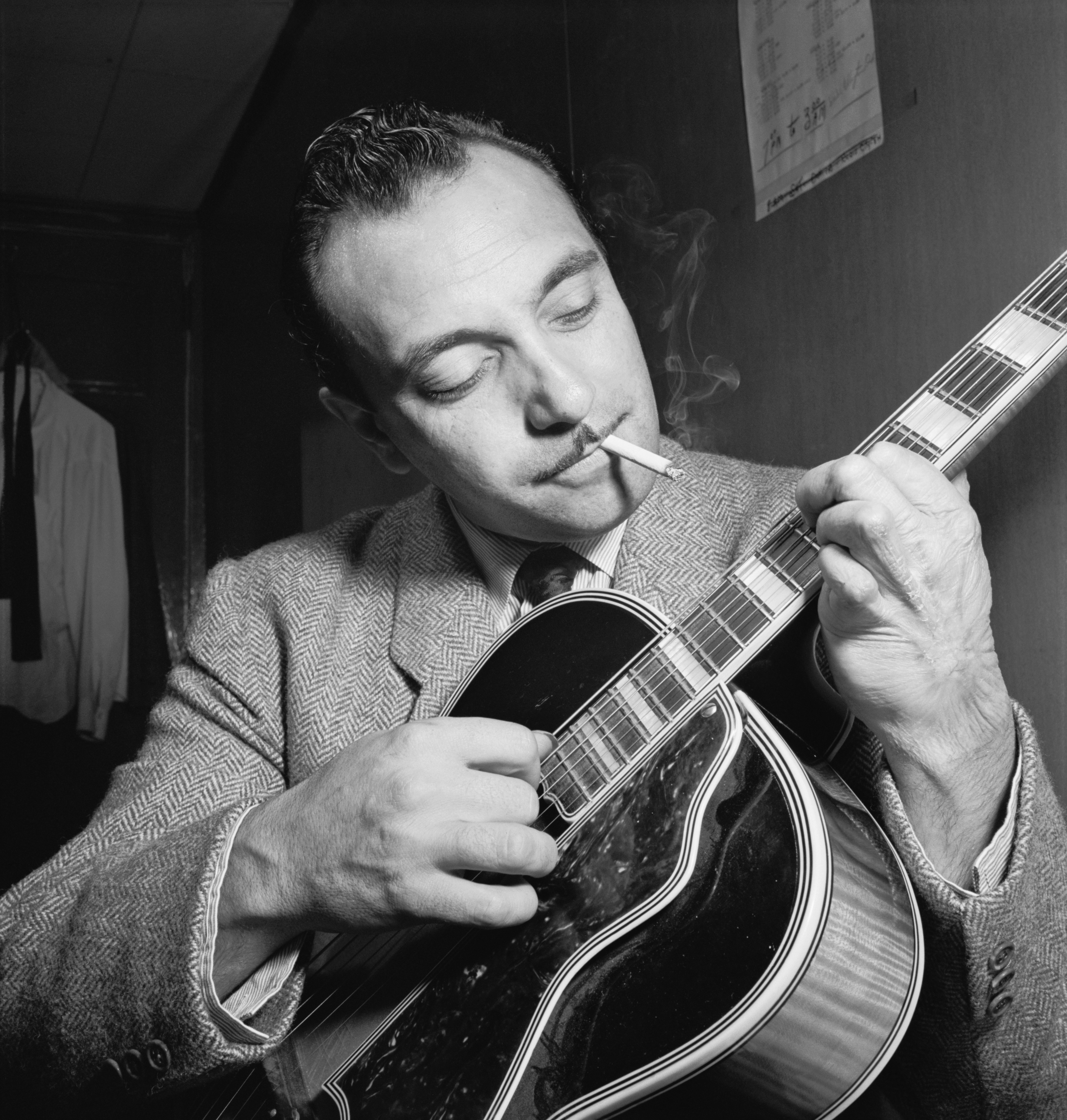
Django Reinhardt

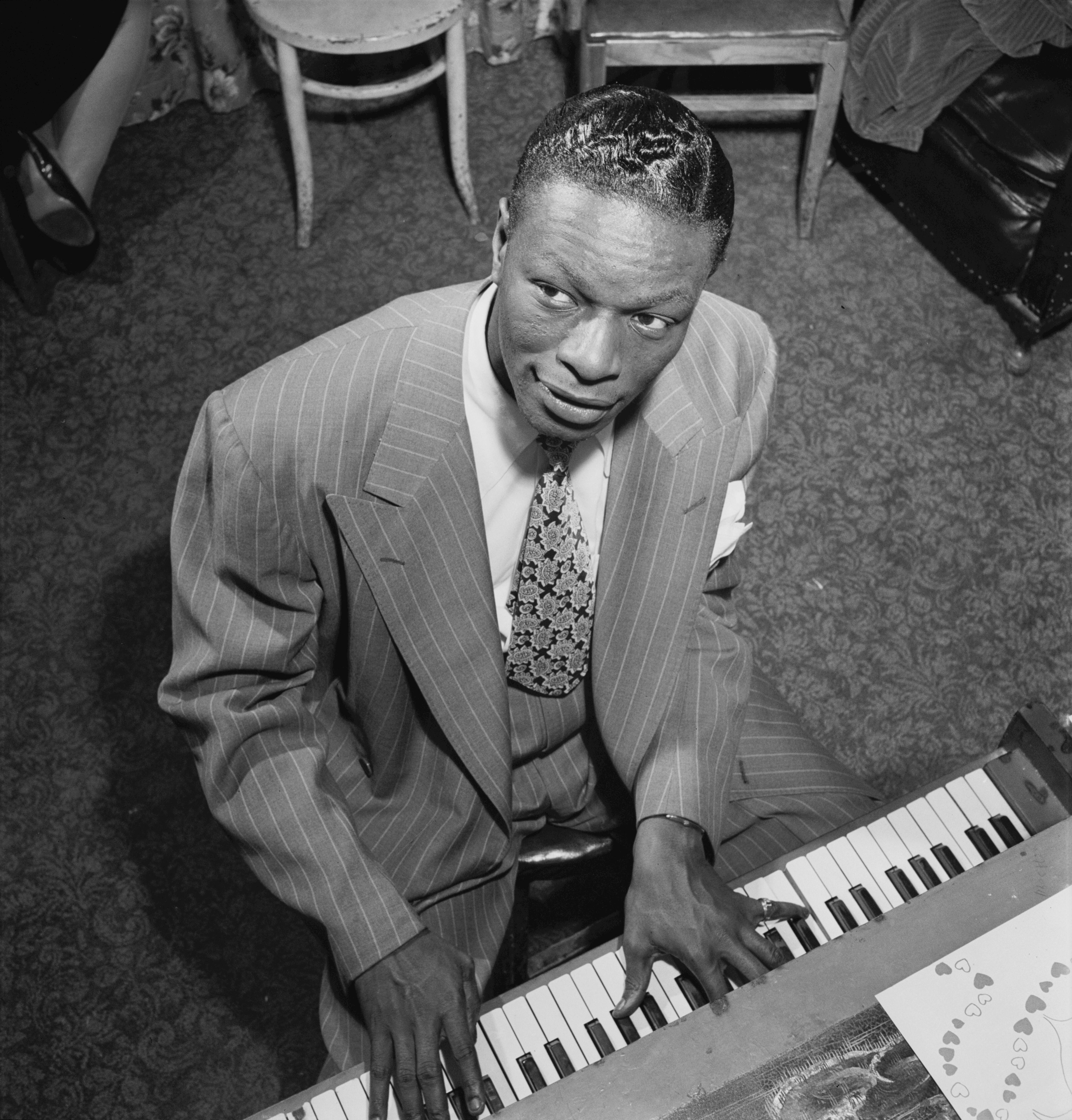
Nat King Cole

- "Ain't She Sweet": Pearl Bailey issued a recording of this standard on Harmony Records.
- "All the Things You Are": Django Reinhardt and Stéphane Grappelli issued a version of the 1939 number.
- "Baby Get Lost": a July, 1949 single by Dinah Washington.
- "Baby Won't You Please Come Home", a recording of the 1919 standard by Sidney Bechet & His Feetwarmers.
- "Baby, It's Cold Outside": there were several recordings of this song in 1949. The version by Dinah Shore and Buddy Clark reached number four on the Billboard chart.
- "Bewitched, Bothered and Bewildered": recorded by Doris Day with The Mellomen.
- "Blue Moon": a version of the standard recorded by Mel Tormé.
- "Blue Skies": Donald Peers recorded the standard at Royal Albert Hall, London.
- "Bye Bye Blues": Dinah Shore recorded the standard.
- "C'est si bon": recorded by Johnny Desmond.
- "Charley, My Boy": recorded by The Andrews Sisters and released by Decca Records.
- "Dust My Broom": a cover of the Robert Johnson classic by Arthur "Big Boy" Crudup.
- "Early Autumn", composed by Ralph Burns and Woody Herman with lyrics by Johnny Mercer, was first released in 1949 and became a hit.
- "East of the Sun (and West of the Moon)": recorded by Sarah Vaughan.
- "Exactly Like You": Nat King Cole recording of the standard.
- "How Blue Can You Get": recorded by Johnny Moore's Three Blazers.
- "Ain't Nobody's Business": a hit sung by Jimmy Witherspoon with the Jay McShann band.
- "Moody's Mood for Love": saxophonist James Moody's instrumental solo.
- "Saturday Night Fish Fry": an R&B hit recorded by Louis Jordan and his Tympany Five.

== Industry and technology ==
- New labels launched in 1949 included Coral Records, EMS Recordings, Fantasy Records, Good Time Jazz Records, Jazzology Records, New Orleans Records, Peacock Records, Prestige Records, Roost Records and Tempo Records, a subsidiary of Decca Records.
- Columbia Records opened their CBS 30th Street Studio in Manhattan, New York, thought by some to have been the greatest recording studio in history.
- The Fender Telecaster guitar was introduced, and Gibson launched their ES-165, ES-175 and ES-5 guitars.
- Capitol Records and Decca Records introduced their first LPs (33-1/3 rpm). In response, RCA Records released the first 45 rpm recordings, while Universal Audio was granted a patent for "Double Feature", a method for putting two songs on each side of a 10-inch record.

== Deaths ==
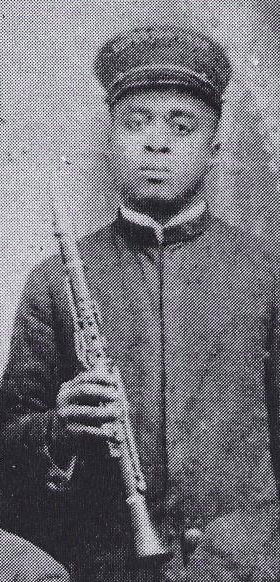
Big Eye Louis Nelson Delisle, 1910

January

- 14 – George Baquet, American clarinetist (born 1881).

February

- 14 – Seymour Simons, American pianist, composer, orchestra leader, and radio producer (born 1896).

March

- 20 – Irving Fazola, American clarinetist (born 1912).

April

- 11 – Herbie Haymer, American reedist, known primarily as a saxophonist in big bands (born 1915).
- 21 – Snoozer Quinn, American guitarist (born 1907).
- 25 – Kid Rena, American trumpeter (born 1898).

July

- 2 – Bud Scott, American guitarist, banjoist, and singer (born 1890).
- 7 – Bunk Johnson, New Orleans trumpeter (born 1879).
- 11 – Danny Polo, American clarinetist (born 1901).

August

- 18 – Paul Mares, American early dixieland jazz cornet & trumpet player, and leader of the New Orleans Rhythm Kings (born 1900).
- 20 – Louis Nelson Delisle, dixieland clarinetist (born 1885).

October

- 23 – Buster Wilson, American pianist (born 1897).

December

- 3 – Albert Ammons, American pianist, a player of boogie-woogie (born 1907).
- 28 – Ivie Anderson, American singer (born 1905).

== Births ==
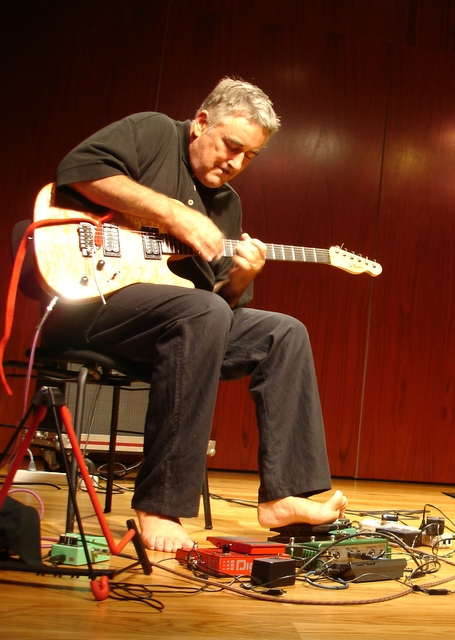
Fred Frith August 2006.

January

- 6 – Chris Laurence, English upright bassist.
- 21 – David Moss, American composer, percussionist, and singer.
- 22 – Phil Miller, English guitarist (died 2017).
- 25 – Paul Murphy, American drummer.
- 27 – Djavan, Brazilian singer and songwriter.
- 29 – Vincent Klink, German trumpeter, chef, and restaurateur.

February

- 16 – Michel Herr, Belgian pianist, composer, and arranger.
- 17 – Fred Frith, English guitarist, multi-instrumentalist, composer, and improvisor, Henry Cow.
- 18 – Justo Almario, Colombian flutist and saxophonist.

March

- 16 – Jerry Goodman, American violinist Mahavishnu Orchestra.
- 29
  - Carlos Azevedo, Portuguese composer and pianist (died 2012).
  - Michael Brecker, American saxophonist, Brecker Brothers (died 2007).

April

- 2 – Per Husby, Norwegian pianist and composer.
- 3 – Eric Kloss, American saxophonist.
- 22 – David Attwooll, British drummer, poet, and publisher, Henry Cow (died 2016).

May

- 1 – Tim Hodgkinson, British experimental music composer, performer, and reedist, Henry Cow.
- 5
  - David Toop, English musician and author.
  - Kaoru Abe, Japanese avant-garde alto saxophonist (died 1978).
  - Randy Sandke, American trumpeter and guitarist.
- 13 – Philip Kruse, Norwegian trumpeter and music publisher.
- 18 – Jim McNeely, American pianist, composer and arranger.

June

- 5 – Jerry Gonzalez, American trumpeter and percussionist (died 2018).
- 12 – John Wetton, English singer, bassist, and songwriter (cancer) (died 2017).
- 14 – Papa Wemba, American soul singer (died 2016).
- 20 – Harald Halvorsen, Norwegian trombonist.
- 21 – Christy Doran, Irish guitarist.
- 26 – Gyula Babos, Hungarian guitarist (died 2018).
- 29 – Richard James Burgess, English singer, drummer, electronic musician, songwriter, producer, and composer.

July

- 6 – Phyllis Hyman, American singer and actress (died 1995).
- 17 – Chico Freeman, American tenor saxophonist and trumpeter.
- 30 – Duck Baker, American acoustic guitarist.

August

- 6
  - Lillian Boutté, American singer.
  - Olli Ahvenlahti, Finnish pianist, composer, and conductor.
- 19 – Danny Mixon, American pianist.
- 21 – Malachi Thompson, American trumpet player (died 2006).
- 25 – Harold Ivory Williams, American keyboardist (died 2010).
- 26 – Leon Redbone, American singer and guitarist.
- 28 – Dennis Davis, American drummer (cancer) (died 2016).

September

- 2 – Knut Borge, Norwegian journalist, entertainer, and jazz enthusiast (died 2017).
- 3 – Onaje Allan Gumbs, American pianist, composer, and bandleader.
- 9 – Larry Stabbins, British saxophonist, flautist, and composer.
- 10 – Viktor Paskov, Bulgarian writer, musician, and musicologist (died 2009).
- 14 – Peter Guidi, Scottish saxophonist and flutist (died 2018).
- 19 – Sally Potter, English composer, musician, film director, actor, and screenwriter.
- 24 – Bill Connors, American guitarist, Return to Forever.
- 27 – Allan C. Barnes, American saxophonist (died 2016).

October

- 5 – Thomas Clausen, Danish pianist.
- 13 – Ray Brown, Jr., American pianist and singer.
- 17 – Kazutoki Umezu, Japanese saxophonist.
- 23 – Tristan Honsinger, American cellist.

November

- 6 – Arturo Sandoval, Cuban trumpeter, pianist and composer.
- 7 – David S. Ware, American saxophonist and composer (died 2012).
- 14 – Raúl di Blasio, Argentine pianist.
- 21 – Rainer Brüninghaus, German pianist and composer.
- 30 – Bill Reichenbach Jr., American trombonist and composer.

December

- 5
  - Enrico Pieranunzi, Italian pianist.
  - John Altman, English film composer, orchestrator, and conductor.
- 7 – Tom Waits, American singer, songwriter, and actor.
- 10 – Pops Mohamed, South African multi-instrumentalist and producer.
- 19 – Lenny White, American drummer Return to Forever.
- 21 – Marilyn Scott, American singer.
- 25 – Konstanty Wilenski, Ukrainian-Polish pianist and composer.
- 27 – T. S. Monk, American drummer, composer and bandleader.

Unknown date

- Jesper Zeuthen, Danish saxophonist composer.

== See also ==
- 1940s in jazz
- List of years in jazz
- 1949 in music

== Bibliography ==
- The New Real Book, Volume I. Sher Music. 1988. ISBN 0-9614701-4-3.
- The New Real Book, Volume II. Sher Music. 1991. ISBN 0-9614701-7-8.
- The New Real Book, Volume III. Sher Music. 1995. ISBN 1-883217-30-X.
- The Real Book, Volume I (6th ed.). Hal Leonard. 2004. ISBN 0-634-06038-4.
- The Real Book, Volume II (2nd ed.). Hal Leonard. 2007. ISBN 978-1-4234-2452-9.
- The Real Book, Volume III (2nd ed.). Hal Leonard. 2006. ISBN 0-634-06136-4.
- The Real Jazz Book. Warner Bros. ISBN 978-91-85041-36-7.
- The Real Vocal Book, Volume I. Hal Leonard. 2006. ISBN 0-634-06080-5.
