= 1983 in jazz =

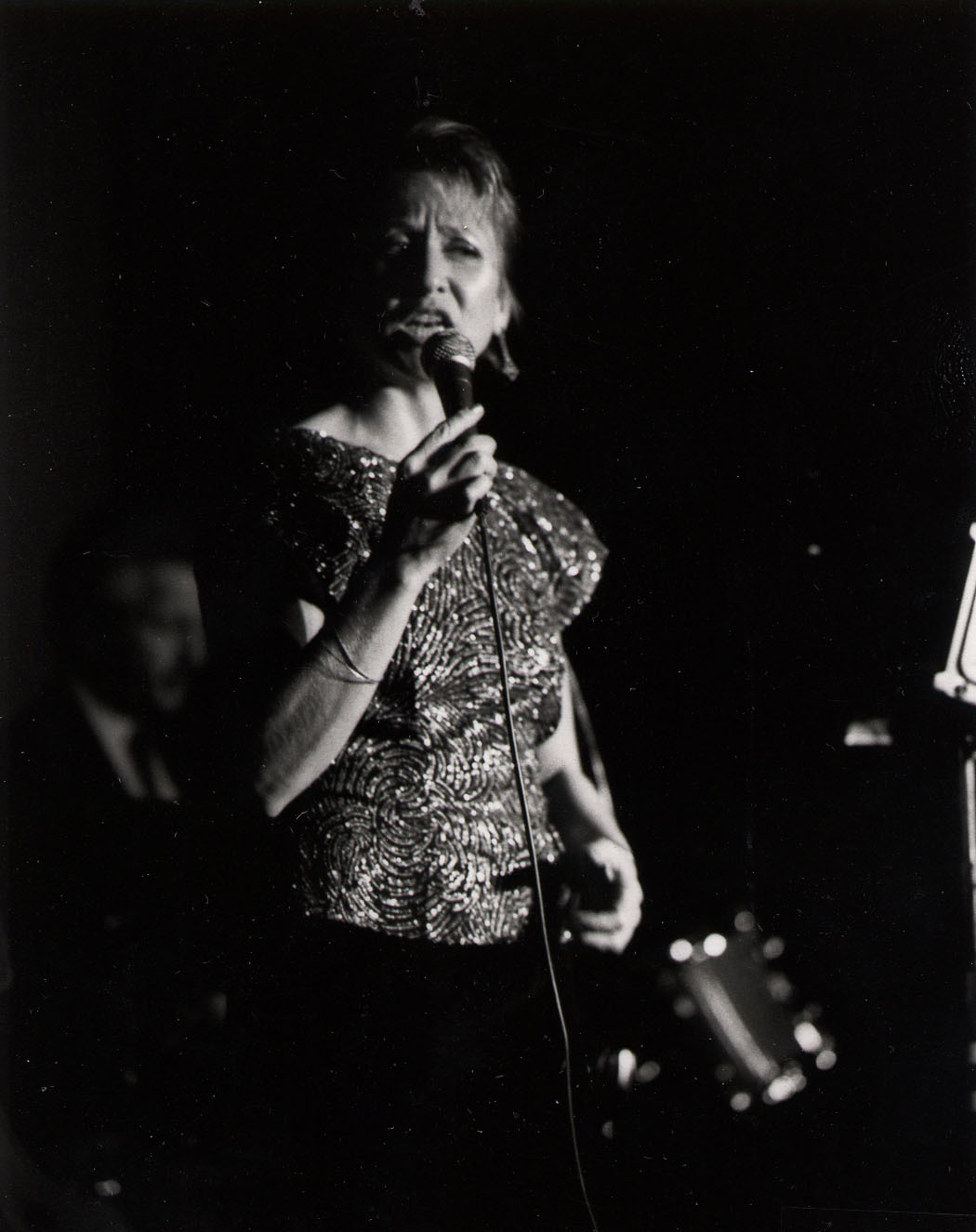
- Dee Bell performing at San Francisco's Great American Music Hall
- Decade: 1980s in jazz
- Music: 1983 in music
- Standards: List of post-1950 jazz standards
- See also: 1982 in jazz – 1984 in jazz

This page is a timeline documenting events of Jazz in the year 1983.

== Events ==
=== March ===
- 25 – The 10th Vossajazz started in Vossavangen, Norway (March 25 – 27).

=== May ===
- 18 – 11th Nattjazz started in Bergen, Norway (May 18 – June 1).
- 20 – 12th Moers Festival started in Moers, Germany (May 20 – 23).

=== June ===
- 1 – The 4th Montreal International Jazz Festival started in Montreal, Quebec, Canada (July 1 – 10).

=== July ===
- 8
  - The 8th North Sea Jazz Festival started in The Hague, Netherlands (July 8 – 10).
  - The 17th Montreux Jazz Festival started in Montreux, Switzerland (July 8 – 24).

=== September ===
- 16 – The 26th Monterey Jazz Festival started in Monterey, California (September 16 – 18).

=== Unknown date ===
- Eliane Elias married Randy Brecker, brother of Michael Brecker.

== Album releases ==
- Borbetomagus: Barbed Wire Maggots
- Anthony Davis: Hemispheres
- Terje Rypdal: Eos
- Don Pullen: Evidence of Things Unseen
- James Newton: Luella
- Marilyn Crispell: Rhythms Hung in Undrawn Sky
- Ganelin Trio: Semplice
- Microscopic Septet: Take the Z Train
- Muhal Richard Abrams: Rejoicing with the Light
- Tim Berne: Mutant Variations
- Terence Blanchard & Donald Harrison: New York Second Line
- Steps Ahead: Steps Ahead
- Dollar Brand: Ekaya
- Jamaaladeen Tacuma: Show Stopper
- Pat Metheny: Rejoicing
- Paul Motian: The Story of Maryam
- Joachim Kuhn: I'm Not Dreaming
- Kenny Wheeler: Double, Double You
- Lakshminarayana Subramaniam: Spanish Wave
- Roger Neumann: Introducing Rather Large Band
- Dave Holland: Jumpin' In
- Henry Threadgill: Just the Facts and Pass the Bucket
- George Russell: So What
- Derek Bailey: Epiphany
- Bobby Shew: Breakfast Wine
- Bob Wasserman: Solo
- Joe McPhee: Visitation
- Bobby Watson: Jewel
- Branford Marsalis: Scenes In The City
- Wynton Marsalis: Think of One
- Ronald Shannon Jackson: Barbeque Dog
- Shadowfax: Shadowdance
- Michael Franks: Passionfruit
- John Pizzarelli: I'm Hip (Please Don't Tell My Father)

== Deaths ==
January

- 13
  - Barry Galbraith, American guitarist (born 1919).
  - John Ouwerx, Belgian pianist and composer (born 1903).
- 28 – Sweet Emma Barrett, American pianist and singer (born 1897).

February

- 2 – Moses Allen, American upright bassist (born 1907).
- 12 – Eubie Blake, American composer, lyricist, and pianist (born 1887).

March

- 14 – Gigi Gryce, American saxophonist, flautist, clarinetist, and composer (born 1925).
- 16 – Ernie Royal, American trumpeter (born 1921).

April

- 1 – Ken Kersey, Canadian pianist (born 1916).
- 7 – Cag Cagnolatti, American trumpeter (born 1911).
- 13 – Dolo Coker, American pianist and composer (born 1927).
- 22 – Earl Hines, American pianist and bandleader (born 1903).
- 27 – Kippie Moeketsi, South-African alto saxophonist (born 1925).

May

- 6 – Kai Winding, Danish-American trombonist and composer (born 1922).
- 25 – Paul Quinichette, American tenor saxophonist (born 1916).

June

- 19 – Al Lucas, Canadian upright bassist (born 1912).

July

- 1 – Sandy Mosse, American tenor saxophonist (born 1929).
- 5 – Harry James, American trumpeter and band leader (born 1916).
- 8 – Lammar Wright Jr., American trumpeter (born 1924).
- 12 – Chris Wood, English saxophonist and flautist, Traffic (born 1944).
- 15 – Sadik Hakim, American pianist and composer (born 1919).
- 18 – Bob Cornford, British jazz pianist and composer (born 1940).

August

- 9 – Don Ewell, American stride pianist (born 1916).

September

- 1 – Arthur Herzog Jr., American songwriter and composer (born 1900).
- 15
  - Willie Bobo, Puerto Rican-American percussionist (born 1934).
  - Johnny Hartman, African-American singer (born 1923).
- 18 – Roy Milton, American singer, drummer, and bandleader (born 1907).

October

- Wilbert Baranco, American pianist and bandleader (born 1909).

November

- 8 – James Booker, American keyboarder (born 1939).
- 12 – Preston Jackson, American trombonist (born 1902).
- 22 – Kamil Běhounek, Bohemian-Czech accordionist (born 1916).
- 25 – Waymon Reed, American trumpeter (born 1940).

December

- 13 – Marshall Brown, American trombonist and multi-instrumentalist (born 1920).
- 16 – Harry Miller, South African upright bassist (born 1941).

Unknown date

- Pat Smythe, Scottish pianist (born 1923).

== Births ==
January

- 20 – Eivind Lønning, Norwegian trumpeter.

February

- 3 – Gilad Hekselman, Israeli guitarist and composer.
- 22 – Lars Winther, Danish pianist, composer, producer, and arranger.

March

- 10 – Lőrinc Barabás, Hungarian trumpeter and composer.
- 31 – Christian Scott aTunde Adjuah, American trumpeter and composer.

April

- 20 – Ryan Blotnick, American guitarist.

May

- 8 – Nikoletta Szőke, Hungarian singer.
- 26 – Rune Nergaard, Norwegian upright bassist, Bushman's Revenge.

June

- 17 – Jaimie Branch, American trumpeter and electronica artist (died 2022)
- 24 – Gard Nilssen, Norwegian drummer, Puma.
- 30 – Espen Berg, Norwegian pianist, arranger, and composer, Trondheim Jazz Orchestra.

July

- 5 – Sofia Jernberg, Ethiopian-Swedish experimental singer and composer.
- 8 – Jamie Brooks, English pianist, keyboarder, composer, and arranger.
- 13 – Harold López-Nussa, Cuban pianist.
- 22 – Andreas Ulvo, Norwegian pianist, organist, keyboarder, and composer, Eple Trio.

August

- 17 – Luques Curtis, American bassist.

September

- 14 – Amy Winehouse, English singer and songwriter (died 2011).
- 19 – Petter Eldh, Swedish upright bassist and composer.
- 25 – Hayden Powell, English trumpeter and composer.
- 26 – Magnus Hjorth, Swedish pianist and composer.

October

- 7 – Aaron Parks, American pianist and composer.
- 14 – Andreas Stensland Løwe, Norwegian pianist, Splashgirl.
- 19 – Makaya McCraven, American drummer.

November

- 10
  - Bez Idakula, Nigerian multi-instrumentalist, singer-songwriter, and composer.
  - David Virelles, Cuban pianist and composer.
  - Svein Magnus Furu, Norwegian saxophonist composer, and music journalist.
- 23 – Thomas Pridgen, American drummer, The Mars Volta.
- 29 – Bria Skonberg, Canadian trumpeter and vocalist.

Unknown date

- Emanuele Maniscalco, Italian pianist, drummer, and composer.
- Guro Skumsnes Moe, Norwegian upright bassist and singer.
- Lauren Kinsella, Irish singer and composer.
- Tom Hasslan, Norwegian guitarist.

== See also ==
- 1980s in jazz
- List of years in jazz
- 1983 in music
