= 1916 in jazz =

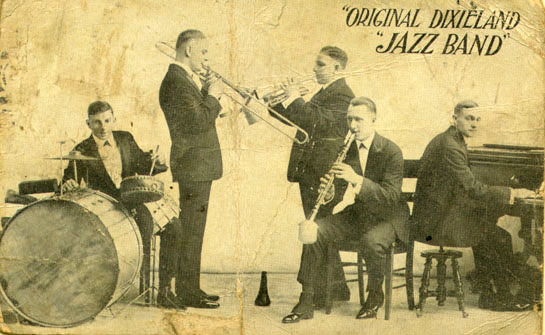
- Promotional postcard of the Original Dixieland Jass Band.
- Decade: Pre-1920 in jazz
- Music: 1916 in music
- Standards: List of pre-1920 jazz standards
- See also: 1915 in jazz – 1917 in jazz

This is a timeline documenting events of Jazz in the year 1916.

Several musicians who were born in this year went on to become big names in jazz, such as the pianist and orchestra leader Buddy Cole.

== Events ==
- 1916 saw the emergence of groups such as the Original Dixieland Jass Band, and publication of the jazz standard "Beale Street Blues".
- June 5 - Stein's Dixie Jass Band plays its first gig under its new name, the Original Dixieland Jass Band.
- The Original Dixieland Jass Band make a hit in Chicago, Illinois
- Wilber Sweatman records his hot ragtime in New York City.

== Births ==
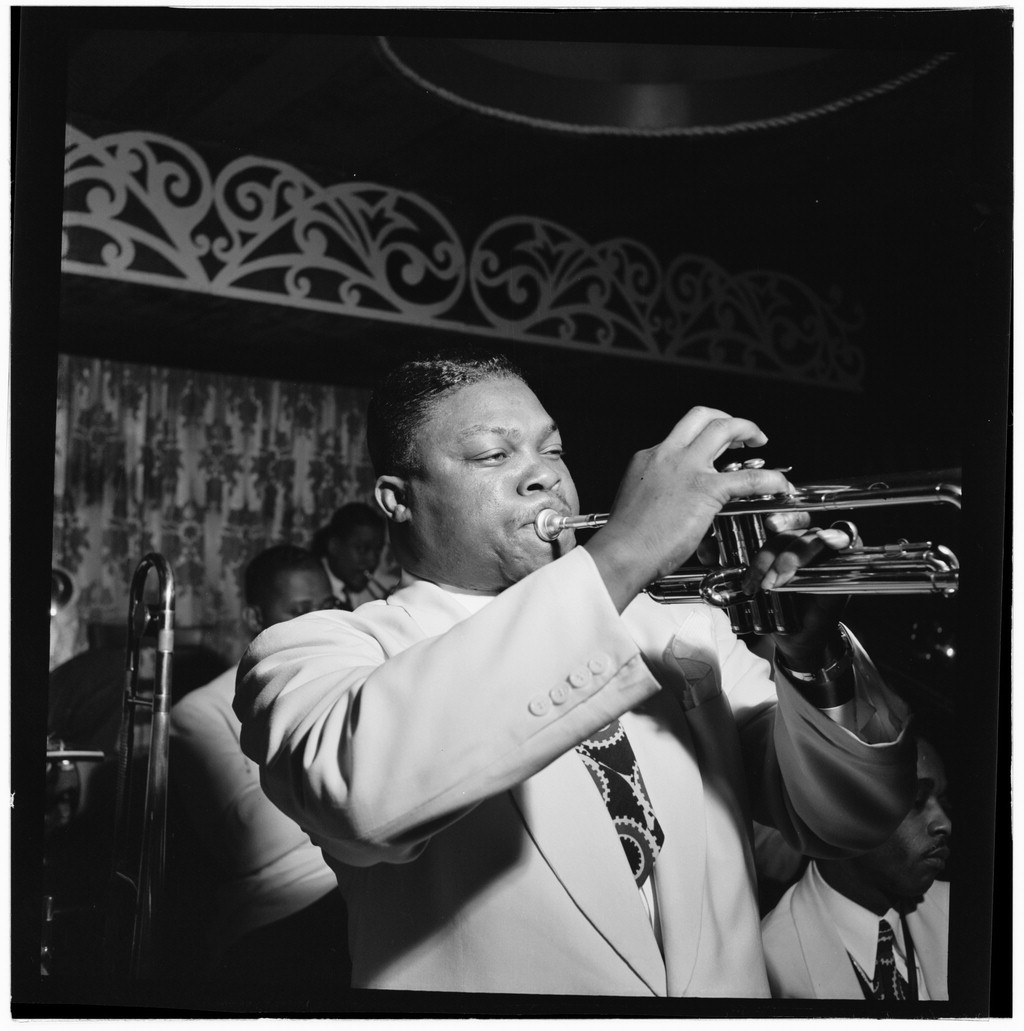
Cat Anderson, Aquarium, New York, ca. 1947

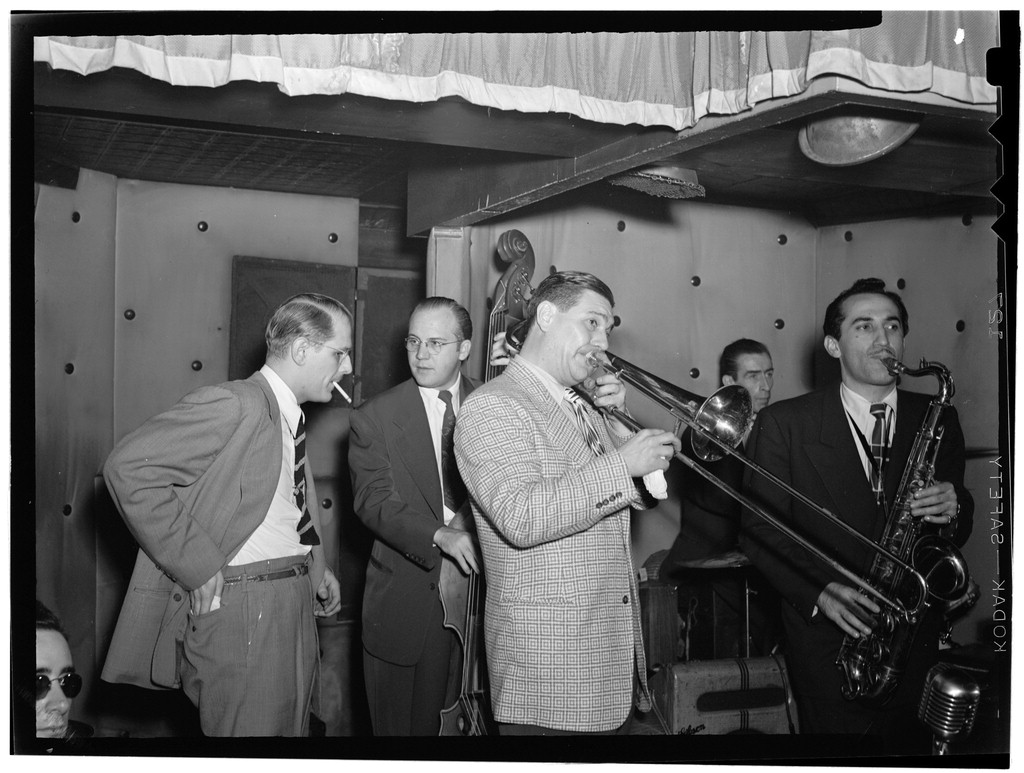
Bill Harris, Dave Tough, and Charlie Ventura, Three Deuces, New York, N.Y., between 1946 and 1948

January

- 4 – Slim Gaillard, American singer, songwriter, pianist, and guitarist (died 1991).
- 12 – Jay McShann, American pianist and bandleader (died 2006).
- 14 – Maxwell Davis, American saxophonist, arranger, and record producer (died 1970).
- 15
  - Artie Shapiro, American upright bassist (died 2003).
  - Hugh Gibb, English drummer and bandleader (died 1992).
- 27 – Milt Raskin, American pianist (died 1977).
- 28 – Cliff Townshend, English saxophonist and clarinetist (died 1986).

February

- 8 – Jimmy Skidmore, English jazz tenor saxophonist (died 1998).
- 12 – Max Geldray, Dutch harmonica player (died 2004).
- 16
  - Bill Doggett, American pianist and organist (died 1996).
  - Charles Fowlkes, American baritone saxophonist (died 1980).
- 28 – Svend Asmussen, Danish violinist (died 2017).

March

- 6 – Red Callender, American string bass and tuba player (died 1992).
- 15 – Harry James, American trumpeter (died 1983).
- 17 – Ray Ellington, English singer, drummer, and bandleader (died 1985).
- 29 – Kamil Běhounek, Bohemian-Czech accordionist (died 1983).

April

- 2 – Oleg Lundstrem, Russian violinist, composer, and conductor (died 2002).
- 3 – Ken Kersey, Canadian pianist (died 1983).
- 9 – Julian Dash, American tenor saxophonist (died 1974).
- 12 – Russell Garcia, American composer and music arranger (died 2011).
- 20 – Burt Bales, American stride pianist (died 1989).
- 22 – Yehudi Menuhin, violinist (died 1999).

May

- 4 – Maurice Purtill, Moe Purtill, American drummer (died 1994).
- 10 – Milton Babbitt, American composer, music theorist, and teacher (died 2011).
- 11 – Moon Mullens, American trumpeter (died 1977).
- 14 – Skip Martin, American saxophonist, clarinetist, and music arranger (died 1976).
- 16 – Dud Bascomb, American trumpeter (died 1972).
- 17 – Paul Quinichette, American tenor saxophonist (died 1983).
- 22 – Joe Springer, American pianist (died 2004).
- 26 – Moondog, American musician, composer, theoretician, and poet (died 1999).

June

- 6 – John Mehegan, American pianist (died 1984).
- 8 – Freddie Webster, American trumpeter (died 1947).
- 15 – Horacio Salgán, Argentine tango pianist (died 2016).
- 17 – Lance Hayward, American pianist (died 1991).
- 27 – Robert Normann, Norwegian guitarist (died 1998).

July

- 7 – Tiny Grimes, American guitarist (died 1989).
- 10 – Dick Cary, American trumpeter, composer, and arranger (died 1994).
- 12 – Sam Taylor, American tenor saxophonist (died 1990).
- 16 – Miles Copeland, Jr., American trumpeter (died 1991).
- 22 – Paul Moer, American pianist (died 2010).
- 29 – Charlie Christian, American guitarist (died 1942).

August

- 3 – Jake Porter, American trumpeter and record producer (died 1993).
- 9
  - Jay McShann, American guitarist (died 1972).
  - Mike Bryan, American guitarist (died 1972).
- 16 – Edythe Wright, American singer (died 1965).

September

- 3 – Trigger Alpert, American bassist (died 2013).
- 12 – Cat Anderson, American trumpeter (died 1981).
- 27 – Teddy Brannon, American pianist (died 1989).

October

- 8 – Bill Stegmeyer, American clarinetist and arranger (died 1968).
- 15 – Al Killian, American trumpeter and occasional bandleader (died 1950).
- 28 – Bill Harris, American trombonist (died 1973).
- 29 – Hadda Brooks, American pianist, vocalist, and composer (died 2002).

November

- 7 – Joe Bushkin, American pianist (died 2004).
- 10 – Billy May, American composer, arranger, and trumpeter (died 2004).
- 14
  - Don Ewell, American stride pianist (died 1983).
  - George Fierstone, English drummer (died 1984).
- 16 – Al Lucas, Canadian upright bassist (died 1983).
- 23 – Norman Keenan, American upright bassist (died 1980).
- 30 – Benny Moten, American bassist (died 1977).

December

- 2 – Charles Ventura, American tenor saxophonist and band leader.
- 9 – Bob Scobey, American singer, trumpeter, banjo player, and band leader (died 1963).
- 15 – Buddy Cole, American pianist and orchestra leader (died 1964).
- 25 – Oscar Moore, American guitarist (died 1981).
- 27 – Johnny Frigo, American jazz violinist and bassist (died 2007).

Unknown date

- Oliver Todd, American band leader, organist, pianist, and trumpeter (died 2001).
