= Maniscalco =

Maniscalco (Italian pronunciation: [maniˈskalko]) is an Italian surname. Maniscalco means "marshall," from medieval Latin mariscalcus, marescalcus; as such it was likely an occupational name (cf. Farrier).

== Notable people ==
- Albert V. Maniscalco (1908–1998), American politician
- Emanuele Maniscalco (born 1983), Italian jazz pianist, drummer and composer
- Sebastian Maniscalco, Italian-American stand-up comedian
- Fabio Maniscalco (1965–2008), Italian archaeologist, specialist about the protection of cultural property and essayist
- Hook n Sling (born Anthony Maniscalco)
