= 1973 in jazz =

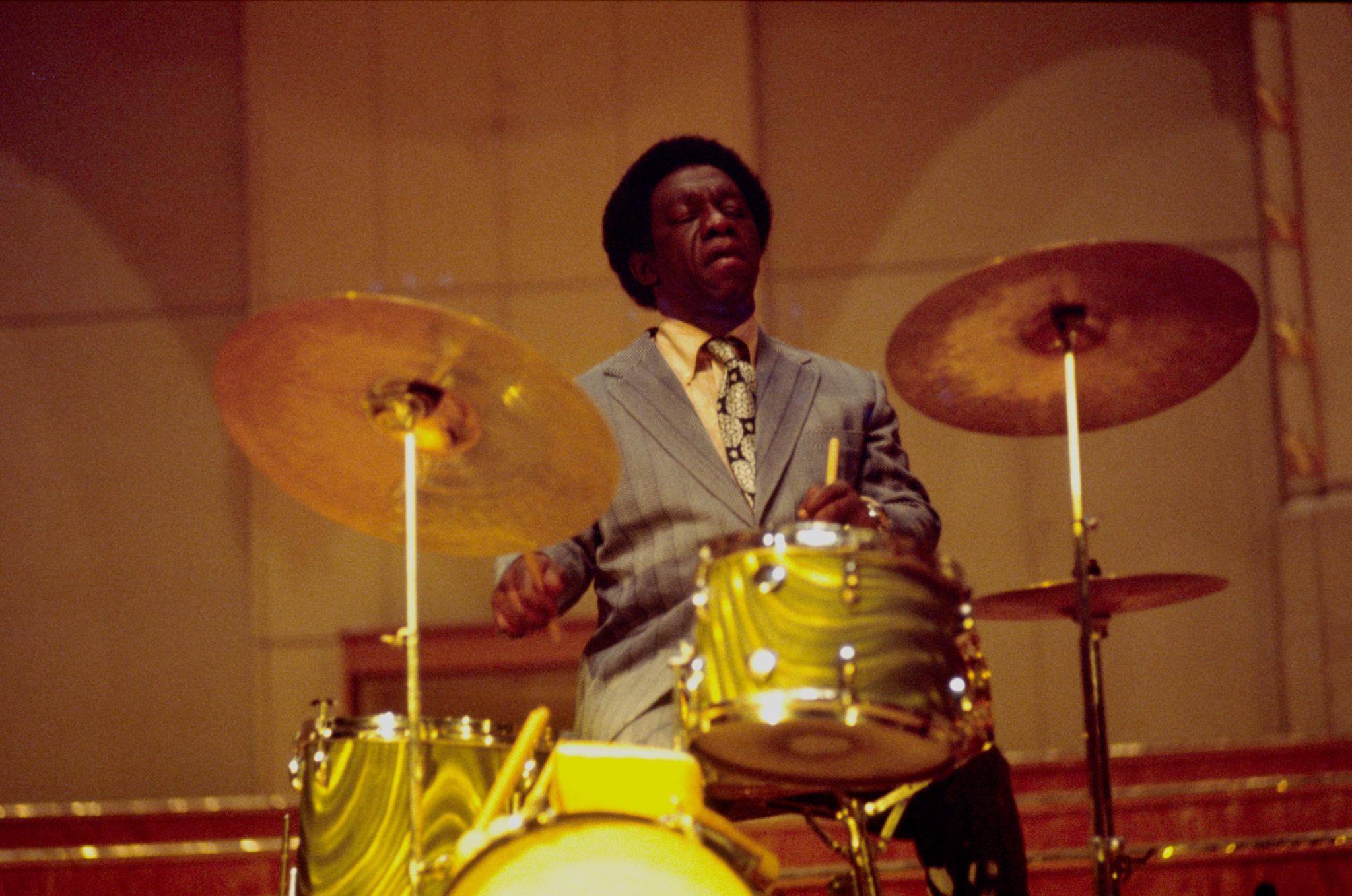
- Art Blakey touring in 1973 as part of the "Giants of Jazz" bill in the Musikhalle, Hamburg
- Decade: 1970s in jazz
- Music: 1973 in music
- Standards: List of post-1950 jazz standards
- See also: 1972 in jazz – 1974 in jazz

This is a timeline documenting events of Jazz in the year 1973.

== Events ==
=== May ===
- 23 – The very first Nattjazz started in Bergen, Norway (May 23 – June 6).

=== June ===
- 9 – The 2nd Moers Festival started in Moers, Germany (June 9 – 11).
- 29
  - The 20th Newport Jazz Festival started in New York, New York for its second year there. (June 29 – July 8).
  - The 7th Montreux Jazz Festival started in Montreux, Switzerland (June 29 – July 15).

=== September ===
- 21 – The 16th Monterey Jazz Festival started in Monterey, California (September 21 – 23).

== Album releases ==
- Art Ensemble of Chicago: Fanfare For The Warriors
- Gato Barbieri: Chapter One: Latin America
- Paul Bley
  - Paul Bley & Scorpio
  - Paul Bley/NHØP
- Dollar Brand
  - African Portraits
  - African Space Program
  - Sangoma
- Marion Brown: Geechee Recollections
- Betty Carter: Album (Betty Carter album)
- Don Cherry: Relativity Suite
- Billy Cobham Spectrum
- Charles Earland: Charles III (album)
- Michael Franks: Michael Franks
- Hal Galper: Inner Journey
- Herbie Hancock
  - Head Hunters
  - Sextant
- Keith Jarrett: Solo Concerts: Bremen/Lausanne
- Roland Kirk: Prepare Thyself To Deal With A Miracle
- David Liebman: First Visit
- Frank Lowe: Black Beings
- Mahavishnu Orchestra – Birds of Fire
- Michael Mantler: No Answer
- Paul Motian: Conception Vessel
- Oregon: Distant Hills
- Joe Pass: Virtuoso (Joe Pass album)
- Oscar Peterson: The Trio
- Flora Purim: Butterfly Dreams
- Dewey Redman: The Ear of the Behearer
- Sam Rivers: Streams
- Roswell Rudd: Numatik Swing Band
- Spontaneous Music Ensemble: Mouthpiece
- John Surman: Morning Glory
- Cecil Taylor: Solo
- Cecil Taylor: Spring of Two Blue J's
- Ralph Towner: Diary
- McCoy Tyner: Enlightenment
- Mal Waldron: Up Popped the Devil
- Weather Report: Sweetnighter
- Eberhard Weber: The Colours of Chloë
- Frank Wright: Church Number Nine

== Deaths ==
January

- 2 – Joe Harriott, Jamaican saxophonist and composer (born 1928).
- 3 – Wilbur de Paris, American trombonist and bandleader (born 1900).
- 23 – Kid Ory, American trombonist and bandleader(born 1886).

February

- 3 – Andy Razaf, African-American poet, composer, and lyricist (born 1895).
- 19 – Leon Washington, American tenor saxophonist (leukemia) (born 1909).

March

- 2 – Spanky DeBrest, American upright bassist (born 1937).

April

- 18 – Willie "The Lion" Smith, American pianist (born 1897).

May

- 14 – Elmer Snowden, American banjo and guitar player (born 1900).
- 24 – Sid Phillips, English clarinettist, bandleader, and arranger (born 1907).

June

- 8 – Tubby Hayes, English saxophonist and multi-instrumentalist (born 1935).

August

- 4 – Eddie Condon, American banjoist, guitarist, and bandleader (born 1905).
- 21 – Bill Harris, American trombonist (born 1916).

September

- 20 – Ben Webster, American tenor saxophonist (born 1909).
- 26 – Bernard Etté, German violinist and conductor (born 1898).

October

- 16 – Gene Krupa, American drummer, band leader, actor, and composer (born 1909).

December

- 3 – Emile Christian, American trombonist (born 1895).

== Births ==
January

- 4
  - Bartlomiej Oles, Polish drummer, composer, and record producer.
  - Marcin Oles, Polish bassist, composer and record producer.
- 12 – Brian Culbertson, American keyboardist and trombonist.
- 31 – Petr Kroutil, Czech clarinettist, saxophonist, bansuri player, vocalist, composer, and arranger.

February

- 3 – Timuçin Şahin, Turkish guitarist and composer.
- 11 – Ethan Iverson, American pianist, composer, and critic.
- 22 – Gustavo Assis-Brasil, Brazilian-American guitarist.

March

- 23 – Stefon Harris, American vibraphonist.

April

- 17 – Moses Taiwa Molelekwa, South African pianist (died 2001).
- 30 – Frédéric Yonnet, French harmonica player and producer.

May

- 14 – Clare Teal, English singer.
- 23 – Nikki Yeoh, British pianist and composer.
- 24 – Hallgeir Pedersen, Norwegian guitarist and composer.

June

- 3 – Ebru Aydın, Turkish singer and songwriter.
- 4
  - Gunhild Seim, Norwegian trumpeter and composer.
  - Scott Hammond, English drummer, Jethro Tull.

July

- 2 – Teodross Avery, American tenor saxophonist.
- 8 – Magne Thormodsæter, Norwegian upright bassist and composer.
- 21 – Susheela Raman, British-Indian singer and songwriter.

August

- 9 – Meg Okura, American violinist, ehru player, and composer.
- 11 – Torbjørn Sletta Jacobsen, Norwegian saxophonist and composer.

September

- 3 – Norihiko Hibino, Japanese video game composer and saxophonist.
- 4 – Wetle Holte, Norwegian drummer and composer.
- 7 – Thomas T. Dahl, Norwegian guitarist and composer, Krøyt and Dingobats.
- 9 – John Blackwell American drummer, Prince (died 2017).
- 12 – Dorota Miśkiewicz, Polish singer, songwriter, composer, and violinist.
- 21 – Fredrik Wallumrød, Norwegian drummer and composer.
- 26
  - Nelson Williams, American trumpeter.
  - Nicholas Payton, American trumpeter and multi-instrumentalist.

October

- 3
  - Eirik Hegdal, Norwegian saxophonist, composer, and arranger.
  - Marius Reksjø, Norwegian upright bassist.

November

- 3 – Eivind Austad, Norwegian pianist, composer, and music teacher.
- 8 – Chris Dave, American drummer and composer.

December

- 18 – Christian Jaksjø, Norwegian trombone and euphonium player.
- 29 – Kalle Kalima, Finnish guitarist and composer.

Unknown date

- Ben Castle, British clarinettist and saxophonist.
- Eivind Opsvik, Norwegian upright bassist and composer.
- Janne Mark, Danish vocalist and composer.
- Kate Dimbleby, English cabaret singer and songwriter.
- Maria Markesini, Greek singer and pianist.
- Özay Fecht, Turkish-German actress and singer.
- Titilayo Adedokun, Nigerian-American singer.

== See also ==
- 1970s in jazz
- List of years in jazz
- 1973 in music
