= 1900 in jazz =

- Decade: Pre-1920 in jazz
- Music: 1900 in music
- Standards: List of pre-1920 jazz standards
- See also: 1901 in jazz

This is a timeline documenting events of Jazz in the year 1900.

== Events ==
- The New Orleans players are adapting a mix of ragtime, blues, brass band music, pop songs and dances, and the jazz stew is now brewing. Some also start to improvise the pop songs.

== Births ==
January

- 1 – Xavier Cugat, Spanish-American bandleader (died 1990).
- 11 – Wilbur de Paris, American trombonist and bandleader (died 1973).
- 22 – Juan Tizol, Puerto Rican trombonist and composer (died 1984).

February

- 3 – Mabel Mercer, English-born cabaret singer (died 1984).
- 9 – Walter Page, American upright bassist, multi-instrumentalist, and bandleader (died 1957).
- 13 – Wingy Manone, American trumpeter, composer, singer, and bandleader (died 1982).
- 24 – Jimmy Bertrand, American drummer (died 1960).
- 25 – Tiny Parham, Canadian-American bandleader and pianist (died 1943).

March

- 10 – Peter DeRose, American pianist and songwriter (died 1953).
- 24 – June Clark, American trumpeter and cornetist (died 1963).
- 25 – Barney Rapp, American orchestra leader and musician (died 1970).

May

- 27 – Chester Zardis, American upright bassist (died 1990).
- 28 – Tommy Ladnier, American trumpeter (died 1939).

June

- 15 – Paul Mares, American cornetist, trumpeter, and bandleader, New Orleans Rhythm Kings (died 1949).

July

- 13 – George Lewis, American clarinetist (died 1968).
- 18 – Wilton Crawley, American composer and clarinetist (died 1948).
- 29 – Don Redman, American musician, arranger, bandleader, and composer (died 1964).

September

- 24 – Poley McClintock, American singer (died 1980).

October

- 9 – Elmer Snowden, American banjo and guitar player (died 1973).
- 17 – Jimmy Harrison, American trombonist (died 1931).
- 22 – Cyril Blake, Trinidadian trumpeter (died 1951).
- 24 – Lawrence Marrero, American banjoist (died 1959).

December

- 13 – Arthur Herzog, Jr., American songwriter and composer (died 1983).
- 14 – Juan d'Arienzo, Argentine tango violinist, band leader, and composer (died 1976).
- 29 – Willie Humphrey, American clarinetist (died 1994).

Unknown date

- Joe Appleton, West Indies saxophonist and clarinetist (died 1956).
