= Oscar Peterson and Nelson Riddle =

Studio album by Oscar Peterson and Nelson Riddle
- Released: 1963
- Recorded: November 8 & 10, 1963
- Studio: Radio Recorders, Los Angeles, California
- Genre: Jazz
- Length: 75:03
- Label: Verve V6-8562
- Producer: Jim Davis

Oscar Peterson chronology
Bill Henderson with the Oscar Peterson Trio (1963)	Oscar Peterson and Nelson Riddle (1963)	The Oscar Peterson Trio Plays (1964)

Nelson Riddle chronology
The Best of Nelson Riddle (1963)	Oscar Peterson and Nelson Riddle (1963)	White on White, Shangri-La, Charade & Other Hits of 1964 (1964)

Oscar Peterson and Nelson Riddle is a 1963 album by Oscar Peterson with orchestra arranged and conducted by Nelson Riddle. The album was produced by Jim Davis and released on Verve Records.

The album was also reissued in 1984 as Oscar Peterson: The Silver Collection with four tracks added that were recorded by his Trio in 1964, "Con Alma", "Maids of Cadiz", "My Heart Stood Still" and "Woody 'n' You", but omitting track two of the recording with Riddle ("Judy").

The original album was remastered and re-released by Verve in 2009.

Riddle was nominated at the 7th Annual Grammy Awards for the Grammy Award for Best Jazz Performance – Large Group (Instrumental) for his work on this album.

== Reception ==
Professional ratings
Review scores
Source	Rating
AllMusic	4/5 stars

Billboard described the album as "a neat teaming of talents here brings Peterson more strongly into the pop area than at any time in the past... Riddle's arrangements blend handsomely with their 10 celli, 5 horns and 5 flutes voicings, with Peterson's perhaps underplayed pianistics here. There is, in fact, a kind of Claude Thornhill quality to these proceedings, making for strong mood as well as jazz buyer appeal."

The album was nominated at the 1965 Grammy Awards in the category of Best Instrumental Jazz Performance - Large Group or Soloist with Large Group.

== Track listing ==
1. "My Foolish Heart" (Ned Washington, Victor Young) – 5:00
2. "Judy" (Hoagy Carmichael, Sammy Lerner) – 3:39
3. "'Round Midnight" (Thelonious Monk) – 4:08
4. "Some Day My Prince Will Come" (Frank Churchill, Larry Morey) – 2:52
5. "Come Sunday" (Duke Ellington) – 3:24
6. "Nightingale" (Oscar Peterson) – 4:13
7. "My Ship" (Ira Gershwin, Kurt Weill) – 5:42
8. "A Sleepin' Bee" (Harold Arlen, Truman Capote) – 3:43
9. "Portrait of Jenny" (Gordon Burdge, J. Russel Robinson) – 4:28
10. "Goodbye" (Gordon Jenkins) – 4:05

Track List for Oscar Peterson: The Silver Collection (Polygram Records October 25, 1990).

1. "My Foolish Heart"
2. "Round Midnight"
3. "Someday My Prince Will Come"
4. "Come Sunday"
5. "Nightingale"
6. "My Ship"
7. "A Sleeping Bee"
8. "Portrait of Jenny"
9. "Goodbye"
10. "Con Alma" (Dizzy Gillespie)
11. "Maidens of Cadiz" (Léo Delibes)
12. "My Heart Stood Still"
13. "Woody 'n' You" (Dizzy Gillespie)

== Personnel ==
- Oscar Peterson – piano
- Nelson Riddle – arranger, conductor
