= 1905 in jazz =

- Decade: Pre-1920 in jazz
- Music: 1905 in music
- Standards: List of pre-1920 jazz standards
- See also: 1904 in jazz – 1906 in jazz

This is a timeline documenting events of Jazz in the year 1905.

== Events ==
- Sidney Bechet becomes the protege of clarinetist George Baquet and sits in with the band of trumpeter Freddie Keppard at the age of eight .

== Births ==
January

- 13 – Percy Humphrey, American trumpeter and bandleader (died 1995).

February

- 6 – Jan Werich, Czech singer, actor, playwright, and writer (died 1980).
- 10 – Chick Webb, American jazz and swing music drummer as well as a band leader (died 1939).
- 11 – Lebert Lombardo, Canadian trumpeter and singer (died 1993).
- 22 – Arthur Whetsel, American trumpeter (died 1940).

March

- 3 – Fernand Coppieters, Belgian pianist and organist (died 1981).
- 12 – Chelsea Quealey, American trumpeter (died 1950).

April

- 15 – Bernard Addison, American guitarist (died 1990).
- 19 – Tommy Benford, American drummer (died 1994).

May

- 7 – Georgie Stoll, American musical director, conductor, composer, and violinist (died 1985).
- 18 – Richard McPartland, American guitarist (died 1957).

June

- 13 – Doc Cheatham, American trumpeter, singer, and bandleader (died 1997).
- 17 – Don Kirkpatrick, American jazz pianist and arranger (died 1956).

July

- 8 – Walter Barnes, American clarinetist, saxophonist and bandleader (died 1940).
- 9 – Martha Boswell, American singer, Boswell Sisters (died 1958).
- 10 – Ivie Anderson, American singer (died 1949).

August

- 20 – Jack Teagarden, American trombonist and singer (died 1964).
- 24 – Alphonse Trent, American jazz pianist and territory band leader (died 1959).

October

- 25 – Reuben Reeves, American trumpeter and bandleader (died 1955).

November

- 16 – Eddie Condon, American banjoist, guitarist, and bandleader (died 1973).
- 19 – Tommy Dorsey, American trombonist, composer, conductor and bandleader (died 1956).
- 22 – Cecil Scott, American clarinetist, tenor saxophonist, and bandleader (died 1964).
- 24 – Harry Barris, American singer, pianist, and songwriter (died 1962).

December

- 25 – Ann Ronell, American composer and lyricist (died 1993).
- 29 – Snub Mosley, American trombonist (died 1981).

Unknown date

- Herb Morand, American jazz trumpeter (died 1952).
- Tamara Drasin, American singer (died 1943).
