= Bogdan Hołownia =

Polish jazz pianist

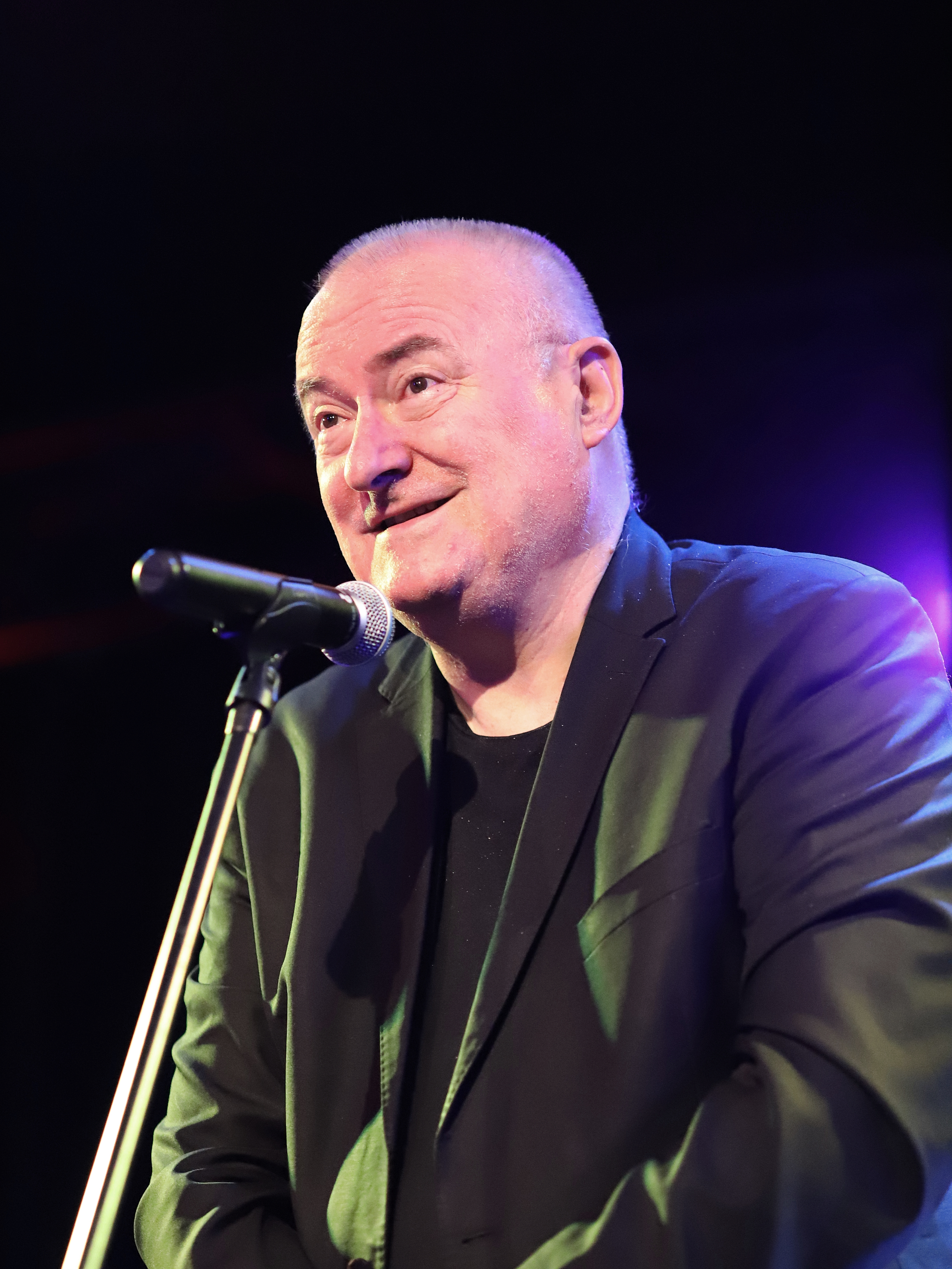
- Bogdan Hołownia, Gniezno 2022

Background information
- Born: Bogdan Hołownia; October 3, 1957 (age 68); Toruń, Poland
- Genres: Jazz
- Years active: 1994 — present
- Label: HoBo Records
- Website: www.holownia.pl

Bogdan Hołownia (born October 3, 1957) is a Polish jazz pianist.

He first played with Jan Wroblewski. Later in his career he played with Janusz Muniak, Adam Kawończyk, Janusz Kozłowski, Marcin Jahr, Krzysztof Mroz, Bronki Harasiuk, Kazimierz Jonkisz.
