= Canadiana Suite =

Studio album by Oscar Peterson
- Released: 1965
- Recorded: September 9, 1964 (New York)
- Genre: Jazz
- Length: 35:10
- Label: Limelight

Oscar Peterson chronology
We Get Requests (1964)	Canadiana Suite (1965)	I/We Had a Ball (1965)

Professional ratings
Review scores
Source	Rating
AllMusic	4/5 stars
The Rolling Stone Jazz Record Guide	3/5 stars

Canadiana Suite is a 1965 album by Oscar Peterson.

== Composition ==
Peterson envisioned Canadiana Suite as a tribute to the diverse landscapes of Canada, drawing inspiration from his travels by rail across southern Canada. Beginning in the Maritime provinces with "Ballad to the East", the suite travels west through the Laurentian Mountains of southern Quebec in "Laurentide Waltz", then pays a visit to the neighbourhood in Montreal where Peterson grew up, Place St. Henri, in the song of the same name. Next, the suite moves on to Canada's next great metropolis, Toronto, in "Hogtown Blues", before heading to the great plains of Manitoba ("Blues of the Prairies") and Saskatchewan ("Wheatland"). Finally, Peterson takes us through Calgary in "March Past", and on into the Rocky Mountains with "Land of the Misty Giants". Explaining his motivation for writing Canadiana Suite, Peterson said "My profession has taken me to every part of the world, none of them more beautiful than where I live. As a musician, I respond to the harmony and rhythm of life, and when I’m deeply moved it leaves something singing inside me. With a country as large and as full of contrast as Canada, I had a lot of themes to choose from when I wrote the Canadiana Suite. This is my musical portrait of the Canada I love."

Canadiana Suite has been played on the Ontario Parliament Network along with his 1970 album Tristeza on Piano.

== Track listing ==
1. "Ballad to the East" – 4:08
2. "Laurentide Waltz" – 5:20
3. "Place St. Henri" – 3:57
4. "Hogtown Blues" – 3:40
5. "Blues of the Prairies" – 4:59
6. "Wheatland" – 5:30
7. "March Past" – 3:25
8. "Land of the Misty Giants" – 4:11

All music composed by Oscar Peterson.

== Personnel ==
- Oscar Peterson – piano
- Ray Brown – double bass
- Ed Thigpen – drums
