= Manfred Hausleitner =

Austrian drummer (born 1957)

- Birth name: Manfred Josef Hausleitner
- Born: May 11, 1957 (age 67)
- Origin: Vienna, Austria, AT
- Genres: Pop; R&B funk jazz dance Latin music Bossa nova Samba; Latin pop
- Occupation: Drummer
- Instrument: drums
- Years active: 1965–1980, 2004–present
- Website: Schlagwerk.eu

Manfred Hausleitner (May 11, 1957) is an Austrian drummer.

== Biography ==
As one of Austria's leading Drummers, Manfred began studying drums at an early age of 6 with his father. He began learning about jazz when he signed up for the jazz institute at the Konservatiorium and Highschool in Vienna, where he studied with Erich Bachtraegl for 8 years in addition with Tino Contreiras/Mexico D.F. and Damaso Gonzales/Acapulco.

He has performed with Sérgio Mendes, Liza Minnelli (Vienna Concert), Art Farmer, Don Cherry (jazz), Friedrich Gulda, Dollar Brand (Abdullah Ibrahim), Jimmy Woode, Charlie Byrd (Austria/Germany concert tour), Sunny Murray, Makaya Ntshoko, Donald Kachamba from Malawi, Harry Sokal, Nat Adderley, Erwin Kiennast ..., as well as the cream of the Austrian jazz scene. Concerts at Jazzfestival Velden, Viktring, Wiesen

Throughout the years Manfred committed himself to teaching students of all ages through private lessons and clinics around the country. Manfred is a Hudson Music featured drum teacher.

After his "first" music career Manfred got a good position in the business world and did not play the drums for 28 years (U.S. Department of State at U.S. Embassy in Vienna --- and General Manager for FTD / Fleurop - Interflora, Austria for 16 years). He quit with his job 2004 and he did not get a chance for a new occupation at the age of 47 years. He restarted to play the drums 2004 with daily 8 hours training and is on the best way to continue his international career.
