= Konstanty Wileński =

Konstanty Wileński Костянтин Віленський
- Born: 25 December 1949 (age 76); Kiev, Ukrainian SSR, Soviet Union
- Genres: Classical; Jazz
- Occupations: Pianist; Composer
- Instrument: Piano

Konstanty Michajłowicz Wileński (Note: Ukrainian: Костянтин Михайлович Віленський, romanized: Kostiantyn Mykhailovych Vilenskyi; Polish: Konstanty Michajłowicz Wileński; Russian: Константин Михайлович Виленский, romanized: Konstantin Mikhaylovich Vilensky) (born 25 December 1949) is a pianist, composer, and jazz musician.

Born in Kiev to a family of musicians, he is a grandson (by adoption) of Illia Vilenskyi (1896–1975), the first director of the Kiev Philharmonic Hall and founder of three musical theaters. His parents, Mykhailo Vilensky and Yelyzaveta Rostkovska, were choreographers. In 1974 he graduated from the Kiev Conservatory and in 1978 completed his postgraduate studies at the same Conservatorium. Since 1983 he was a lecturer of harmony, orchestration, and composition in the same conservatoire. In 1995–2001 he was a musical director of the Stefan Żeromski Theater in Kielce (Poland). He has twelve albums of his own musical works.

Since 1995 he has resided in Kielce, Poland, and he obtained Polish citizenship in 2002.

In 2015 Konstanty Wileński performed with Anatoly Kogan in Israel, with his venture via Cappella Gedanensis on piano.
