= Jose Valdes =

American pianist, organist and bandleader

José Valdes
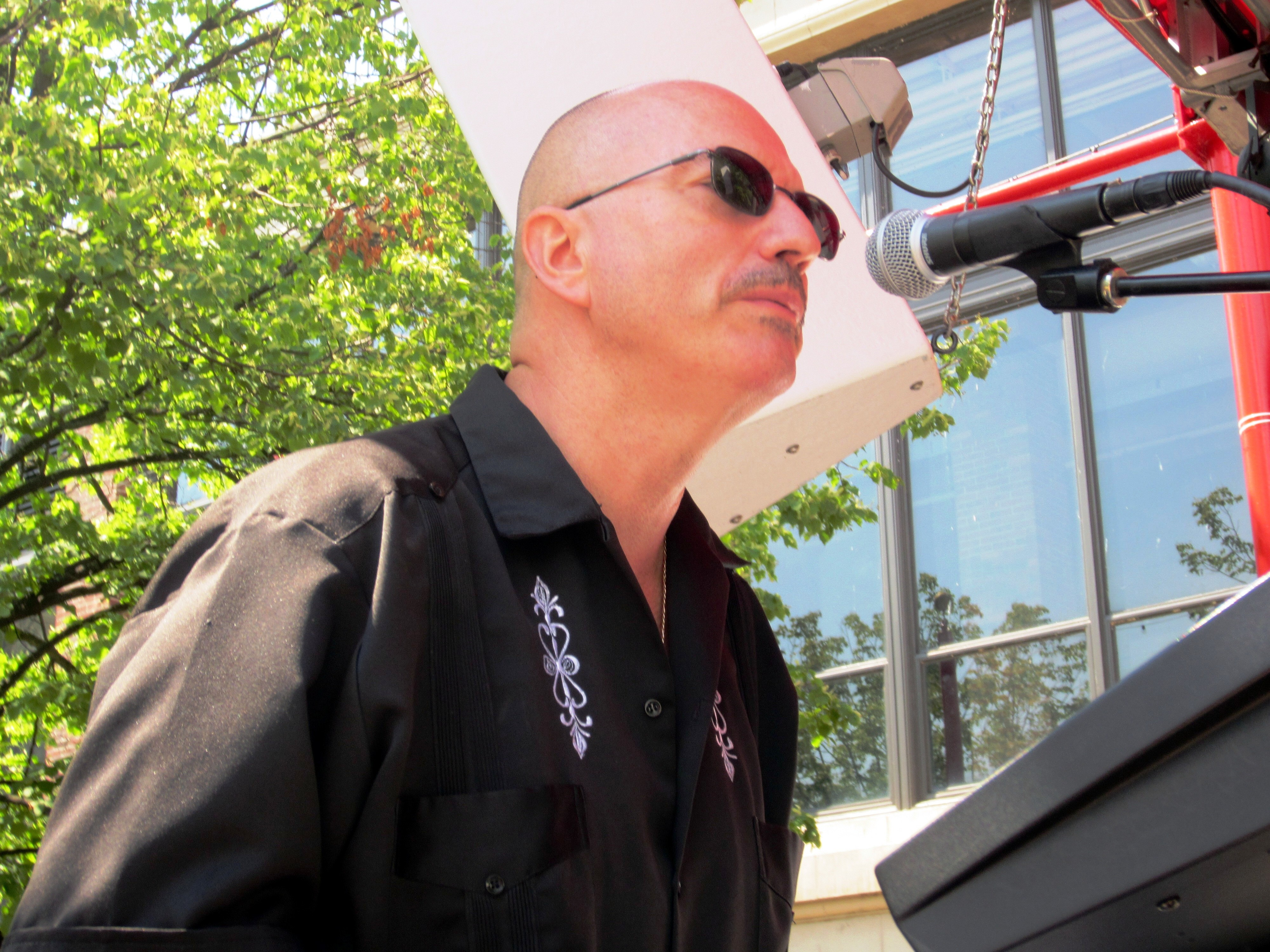
- circa 2018

Background information
- Born: José Angel Valdes; August 4, 1957 (age 68); Chicago, Illinois, U.S.
- Genres: Latin jazz
- Occupations: Musician, bandleader, composer
- Instruments: Piano, organ
- Years active: 1968–present
- Website: www.valdesmusic.com

José Angel Valdes (born August 4, 1957) is a Jazz, Latin jazz and classical pianist, organist and bandleader.

== Career ==
=== Early years ===
His father, José Valdes, was born in San Carlos, Tamaulipas, Mexico and was his first musical influence. His late mother, Elena Valdes, was from Mérida, Yucatán, Mexico. His father's uncles were Norteño (music) musicians that played accordion and guitar. The oldest of three children, Valdes grew up on the south side of Chicago. The musical influence from his father was from his like for jazz and be-bop along with Mexican music. His mother preferred classical music, in particular, waltzes by Johann Strauss II and music of classic Mexican trios such as Los Tres Reyes.

Valdes started piano at age six in elementary school, taking piano lessons from a nun that came to the public school he attended. His predilection for piano was partially influenced by the pianists he saw on television, such as Steve Allen, Liberace, Oscar Levant and Lawrence Welk. He discovered the organ while going to the Sears store with his parents. He taught himself the Magnus chord organ library of books. The organ had 12 chord buttons and a 3-octave keyboard which he played for two years. When he was eleven, his parents bought him a Hammond organ. He took lessons at a store in downtown Chicago with Paul Renard, who became the author of The Music Dynamics Method for Sight Reading, staff organist for Hammond, and co-inventor of the Wurlitzer electric piano which was developed in 1954 at the Wurlitzer Company in Chicago along with Howard Holman.

Valdes learned alto saxophone and became a member of the Bass Public School concert band in Chicago. During his years at the St. Rita of Cascia High School in Chicago, he was involved in the marching and stage bands. While playing alto sax with the stage band, he continued to develop his talent at home on the organ. He attended DePaul University, where he concentrated on composition and Jazz studies.

=== Professional work ===
In 1972 he joined a soul music band known as Purple Sunshine where he first performed in public on organ and saxophone. During the next year, he started his first Latin band, Los Diamantes Negros, a five-piece dance/pop band. In both bands, he played Hammond organ and Fender Rhodes electric piano. While in high school, he expanded the band to eight pieces, adding a brass section. Valdes wrote charts, transcribed and arranged music and acted as bandleader. His favorite musicians included Edgar Winter, The Brecker Brothers, Grand Funk Railroad, Sly and the Family Stone, and the Latin music acts such as El Gran Combo, José José, and the Fania All-Stars. Through his college years, he performed with his band at venues in Chicago.

After college, he toured as a member of the forty-five piece band Topaz. Returning to Chicago, he worked as a freelance musician and in sales at Fields Piano Company. He performed five nights a week at restaurants with a singer/guitarist who played commercial music such as Elvis Presley and Neil Diamond. In 1985, he started playing with local Latin bands, then in 1987 joined La Confidencia with Mike Rivera and Angel Melendez, led by trumpeter Rich Straka.

He established Valdes Music Productions (VMP) in 1992 and created the bands Latin Jazztet, Mambo All Stars, Jazz Facets, and the International VMP Orchestra with Tito Carillo, Charles Desormeaux, Sonia Perez, Luis Rosario, and Cal Drake. These groups performed at the Chicago Jazz Festival, Detroit-Montreaux Jazz Festival, and the Hennessy Jazz Search in New York City.

He was the pianist for a band that combined Latin rhythm with music by Dave Brubeck and John Coltrane. The band consisted of Cal Drake, Charles Desormeaux, Tito Carillo, Rey Reyes, and Joe Frau. He formed the group Mambo Zombies with Desormeaux and Rosario and recorded three albums from 2006 to 2008.

In 2015 he performed with José Valdes and the Mambo All-Stars, with Fred Cantu, Ian Letts, John Mose, Frankie Ocasio, Nathan Rodriguez, Luis Rosario, and Sonia Perez. Valdes has worked with Jose Fajardo, Eddie Palmieri, Tito Puente, Paquito D'Rivera, Armando Manzanero, Nelson Ned, and various Salsa and Jazz artists.

== Discography ==
- Mambo Zombies (2006)
- Southside Christmas (2006)
- MZ 3 (2008)
