= Joe Springer =

American jazz musician

Joe Springer ( May 22, 1916, New York City – October 24, 2004, Miami ) was an American jazz pianist.

Springer played locally on Coney Island from about 1931. His first major gig was with Wingy Manone in 1935; he first recorded in 1940, with Louis Prima. Soon after he worked with Buddy Rich (1942) and Gene Krupa (1942-43), then with Oscar Pettiford, Tiny Grimes, Ben Webster, Charlie Barnet, Jimmy McPartland, Charlie Shavers, Roy Eldridge, and Raymond Scott. He accompanied Billie Holiday regularly in the 1940s and also worked with Anita O'Day. He continued working in New York into the 1960s before retiring to Florida that decade.
