= We Get Requests =

Studio album by Oscar Peterson
- Released: 1964
- Recorded: October 19 – November 20, 1964
- Studio: RCA Studios New York (New York City)
- Genre: Jazz
- Length: 39:42
- Label: Verve
- Producer: Norman Granz

Oscar Peterson chronology
Oscar Peterson Trio + One (1964)	We Get Requests (1964)	Canadiana Suite (1965)

Professional ratings
Review scores
Source	Rating
The Penguin Guide to Jazz Recordings	3/4 stars
Record Mirror	4/5 stars

We Get Requests is an album by jazz pianist Oscar Peterson and his trio, released in 1964 and recorded at RCA Studios New York City on October 19 (tracks 1, 5, 7), October 20 (tracks 2, 3, 4, 6, 8, 9) and November 19 or 20 (track 10). It marks the end of his 14-year partnership with Verve Records.

== Track listing ==
1. "Quiet Nights Of Quiet Stars (Corcovado)" (Antonio Carlos Jobim) – 2:49
2. "The Days of Wine and Roses" (Henry Mancini, Johnny Mercer) – 2:40
3. "My One and Only Love" (Robert Mellin, Guy Wood) – 5:08
4. "People" (Bob Merrill, Jule Styne) – 3:30
5. "Have You Met Miss Jones?" (Lorenz Hart, Richard Rodgers) – 4:10
6. "You Look Good to Me" (Seymour Lefco, Clement Wells) – 4:49
7. "The Girl from Ipanema" (Jobim, Vinicius de Moraes, Norman Gimbel) – 3:51
8. "D & E" (John Lewis) – 5:11
9. "Time and Again" (aka Don't You Think?) (Stuff Smith) – 4:38
10. "Goodbye J.D." (Oscar Peterson) – 2:56

== Personnel ==
The Oscar Peterson Trio

- Oscar Peterson - piano
- Ray Brown - double bass
- Ed Thigpen - drums

Production

- Jim Davis - Producer
- Val Valentin - Director of Engineering
- Bob Simpson - Recording Engineer
