= Oliver Todd =

American jazz musician

Oliver C. Todd (1916–2001) was an American jazz band leader, organ, piano, and trumpet player. He was born in Kansas City, United States. He was one of the city's most famous band leaders and led a band known as the Hottentots, a group he formed in 1934 with Kansas City, Kansas, resident Margaret Johnson, who would assume leadership after Todd left the band in 1936.

Hottentots members included, at various times, the following musicians: Tiny Davis (trumpet) formerly with The International Sweethearts of Rhythm, Gene Ramey (string bass), Winston Williams (string bass), Bill Graham (alto sax) later with Count Basie and Ellington, Clifford Love, Eddie McClelland (tenor sax) and Clayborn Graves. In 1992, he won the KC Jazz Heritage Award. He was also a friend of Charlie Parker.

Oliver Todd died July 16, 2001, at the age of 83. After his death, he was for some time interred in an unmarked grave until The Coda Jazz Fund paid for a headstone for him.
