= Peter Guidi =

Scottish jazz saxophonist and flutist

- Born: 14 September 1949; Glasgow, Scotland
- Died: 17 April 2018 (aged 68) Amsterdam, Netherlands
- Genres: Jazz
- Occupation: Musician
- Instruments: Saxophone, flute
- Website: www.peterguidi.com

Peter Guidi (14 September 1949 – 17 April 2018) was a jazz saxophonist and jazz flutist whose main instruments were the flute, alto and bass flute, alto and soprano saxophones.

== Biography ==
Born in Scotland to Italian parents, Guidi was a self-taught musician. He began his musical career in Italy where he went on to play with many leading jazz musicians and performed in major Jazz Festivals including Umbria Jazz Festival, the Aosta Jazz Festival, the Jazz Festival of Pescara and the Padova Porsche Jazz Festival.

After moving to the Netherlands, he performed in many national jazz festivals including several appearances at the North Sea Jazz Festival with both his quartet and big bands. He was the head of the jazz department of the Amsterdam Muziekschool where he led several ensemble and big band workshops for students of all ages, beginning with students as young as nine years of age. These bands included the Jazz Kidz, Jazz Juniors, Jazz Generation, Jazz Focus Big Band, and Jazzmania Big Band. He was also co-founder of the Junior Jazz College, a collaboration between the Muziekschool Amsterdam and the Amsterdam Jazz Conservatory. Since the Jazz Department began, in 1988, his bands have won a total of 87 prizes in national and international competitions.

In 2008, Guidi co-founded the first edition of the Netherland National Youth Jazz Orchestra (NJJO), which has become an established bi-annual event.

Guidi died from the effects of Creutzfeldt–Jakob disease in Amsterdam, at the age of 68.

== Awards and honors ==
In 2010, Guidi was awarded a Dutch Knighthood (Ridder in de Orde van Oranje-Nassau) for his pioneering work in jazz education in the Netherlands.

== Selected discography ==
- A Weaver of Dreams - 1993 (Timeless CD SJP 401)
- Forbidden Flute - 1999 (BMCD 309 d)
- Beautiful Friendship - 2000 (Timeless CD SJP 352)
- Jazzmania Big Band 'New Impressions'- 2002 (BMCD 378)
- Jazzmania Big Band 'Further Impressions'- 2004 (BMC 458)
- Jazz Focus Big Band 'Focused' - 2007 (JF007-01)

== Bibliography ==
- Guidi, Peter. The Jazz Flute. Molenaar Edition.
