= Petr Kroutil =

Czech musician and actor (born 1973)

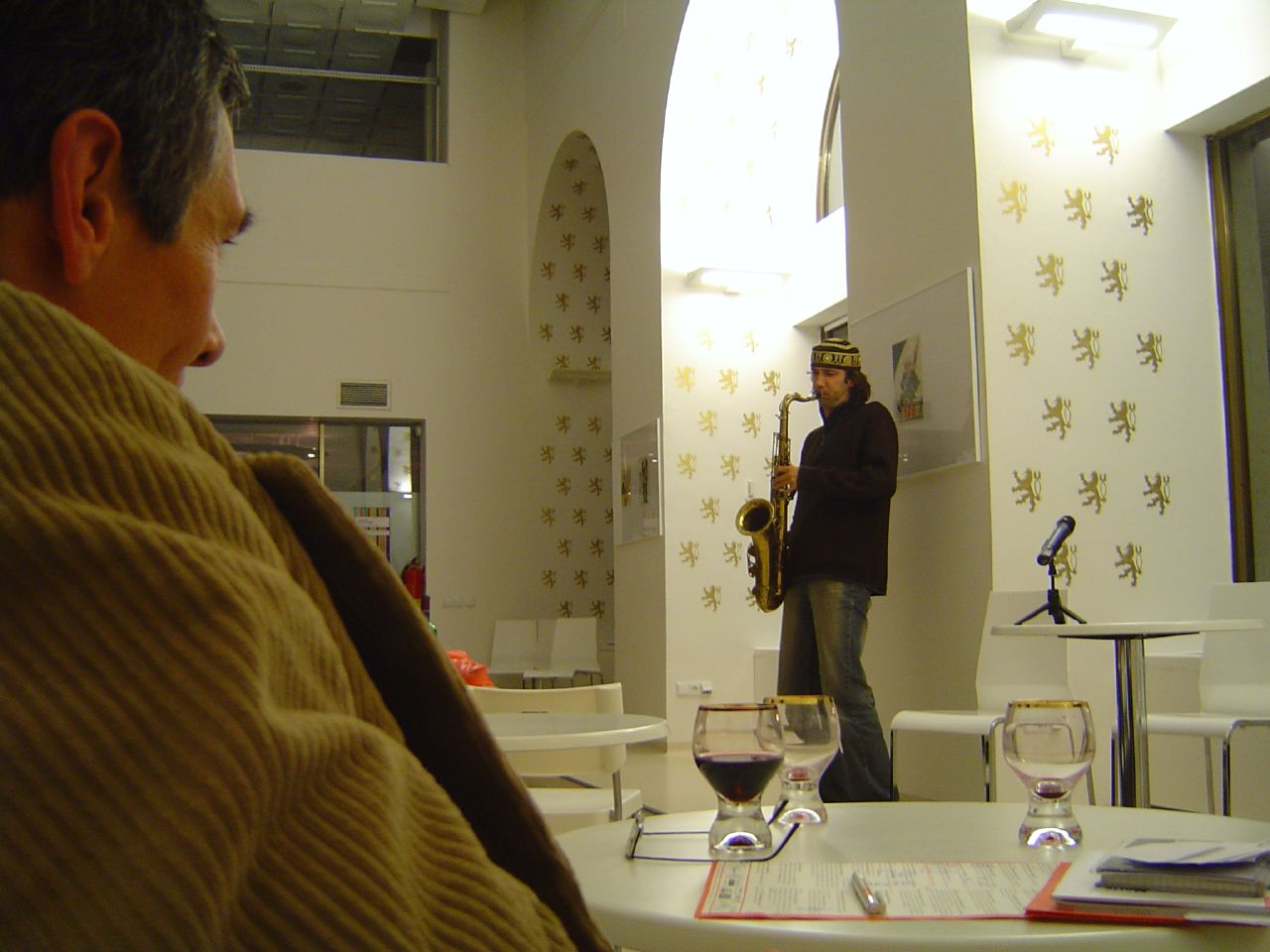
Petr Kroutil performs in 2006.

Petr Kroutil (born 31 January 1973 in Prague, Czechoslovakia) is a Czech musician and actor. He is a vocalist, composer, arranger, and bandleader who plays clarinet, flute, saxophone, and the bansuri.

== Education ==
Kroutil began playing recorder at the age of six. By the age of nine, he had begun studying clarinet. After graduating from high school he studied at Jaroslav Ježek Conservatory of Music in Prague and at Berklee College of Music in Boston. For two years he lived in Nepal to study Indian bamboo flute at Kathmandu University.

== Career ==
In 1991, at the age of eighteen, Kroutil became a member of the Original Prague Syncopated Orchestra. The band concentrated on music from the 1930s and went on tour in Europe and North Africa. After starring in the romantic comedy Prima Sezona (The Swell Season), an adaptation of the novel by Josef Škvorecký, Kroutil gained fame in the Czech Republic. He recorded and performed the soundtrack for the mini-series.

In 1996, Kroutil helped form the Prague Swing Orchestra, specializing in swing music of the 1940s. As lead soloist, singer, and emcee, he played at jazz festivals in Europe. The orchestra has performed concerts which were broadcast internationally on television. In 1997, he formed the modern jazz quintet Přátele Tichého Jazzu influenced by American jazz musicians Chet Baker, Stan Getz, and Gerry Mulligan.

In 2002, Kroutil released the album Bhakti Junction in London with singer Renu Gidoomal. The British-Indian jazz fusion album included two compositions by Kroutil. He became a member of the Royal Caribbean Cruise Line's orchestra in 2003. The Orchestra performed with The Platters with Herb Reed, Marty Allen, Kenny James, Victor Mendoza's Afro-Latin American Big Band, and Joe Mareiny from Louis Armstrong's All Stars Band.

Living in Nepal from 2004 to 2005, he studied bamboo flute, bansuri, and Indian classical music at Kathmandu University. He formed the band The McTwisters, performing his compositions. Members of the band included the Nepali musicians Manoj, Nirakar, Adrian, and Sanjey from the band 1974 A.D.

Returning home to the Czech Republic in August 2005, he formed the trio Shanti which performs his compositions and some standards, and also worked with Czech jazz singer Jana Koubková's band. In 2006 he started the Petr Kroutil Orchestra, which plays jazz standards and his compositions. In 2007 he performed with Russian rock musician Boris Grebenshchikov. Instead of hard rock music, they performed Tibetan mantras for over 800 listeners. For Michal Horáček, he recorded all wind instruments for the bestselling album of the year, Ohrožený druh. With Renu Gidoomal he recorded a children's album called Human Values that was released in the UK in October 2010. They performed on Trafalgar Square for over 25000 people with Bhajazz. Kroutil returned to Trafalgar Square during 2012 for the River of Music Festival. Over 2000 musicians from around the world performed on five stages before the Olympic games started. Kroutil was chosen to represent the Czech Republic, and he performed with Budapest Bar from Hungary. The concert was broadcast by the BBC.

== Bibliography ==
- Last updated in 2006.
