= The Oscar Peterson Trio Plays =

Studio album by Oscar Peterson
- Released: 1964
- Recorded: February 27–28, 1964
- Genre: Jazz
- Length: 37:49
- Label: Verve
- Producer: Norman Granz

Oscar Peterson chronology
Oscar Peterson and Nelson Riddle (1963)	The Oscar Peterson Trio Plays (1964)	Oscar Peterson Trio + One (1964)

The Oscar Peterson Trio Plays is a 1964 album by Oscar Peterson.

== Reception ==
Professional ratings
Review scores
Source	Rating
Allmusic	4/5 stars

Writing for AllMusic, critic Ken Dryden stated: "While it isn't one of Oscar Peterson's very best releases, it is well deserving of being reissued on CD in America."

== Track listing ==
1. "The Strut" (Oscar Peterson) – 4:05
2. "Let's Fall in Love" (Harold Arlen, Ted Koehler) – 4:41
3. "Satin Doll" (Duke Ellington, Johnny Mercer, Billy Strayhorn) – 5:19
4. "Little Right Foot" (Traditional) – 4:53
5. "Fly Me to the Moon" (Bart Howard) – 4:17
6. "Lil' Darlin'" (Neal Hefti) – 3:09
7. "This Nearly Was Mine" (Oscar Hammerstein II, Richard Rodgers) – 4:15
8. "Shiny Stockings" (Frank Foster) – 4:05
9. "You Stepped Out of a Dream" (Nacio Herb Brown, Gus Kahn) – 3:05

== Personnel ==
=== Performance ===
- Oscar Peterson – piano
- Ray Brown – double bass
- Ed Thigpen – drums
