= Lars Winther =

Danish pianist, composer, producer, and arranger

Lars Winther (born 22 February 1983) is a Danish pianist, composer, producer and arranger. He released the debut-album LIVE_2005 with Lars Winther Trio in 2005, followed by the double-disc CD/DVD Nordic By Nature in 2007 — receiving many positive reviews for the latter, as well as distribution throughout Europe and in parts of Asia. In terms of potential, he has been compared to the Norwegian Tord Gustavsen

He has arranged and written for BigBands, a.o. Almost Arrangers BigBand, Klüvers BigBand, MI22, and MIBB (BigBand of Department of Musicology, University of Copenhagen).

In November 2009 he was elected chairman of the Danish Association of Independent Record Labels.

== Awards ==
- Danish Musicians Union's "Fiery-soul" award 2009
