= Oscar Peterson Trio + One =

Studio album by Oscar Peterson trio + Clark Terry
- Released: September 1964
- Recorded: August 17, 1964 (New York)
- Genre: Jazz
- Length: 40:22
- Label: Mercury (US); Verve (reissue); Phillips (UK re-issue)
- Producer: Norman Granz

Oscar Peterson chronology
The Oscar Peterson Trio Plays (1964)	Oscar Peterson Trio + One (1964)	We Get Requests (1964)

Clark Terry chronology
The Happy Horns of Clark Terry (1964)	Oscar Peterson Trio + One (1964)	Tonight (1965)

Professional ratings
Review scores
Source	Rating
AllMusic	5/5 stars
The Penguin Guide to Jazz Recordings	3/4 stars
The Rolling Stone Jazz Record Guide	3/5 stars

Oscar Peterson Trio + One is a 1964 album by Oscar Peterson, featuring Clark Terry.

== Track listing ==
1. "Brotherhood of Man" (Frank Loesser) – 3:32
2. "Jim" (Caesar Petrillo, Milton Samuels, Nelson Shawn) – 3:01
3. "Blues for Smedley" (Oscar Peterson) – 6:56
4. "Roundalay" (Peterson) – 3:55
5. "Mumbles" (Clark Terry) – 2:01
6. "Mack the Knife" (Bertolt Brecht, Kurt Weill) – 5:16
7. "They Didn't Believe Me" (Jerome Kern, Herbert Reynolds) – 4:21
8. "Squeaky's Blues" (Peterson) – 3:28
9. "I Want a Little Girl" (Murray Mencher, Billy Moll) – 5:10
10. "Incoherent Blues" (Terry) – 2:42
- on tracks 2 and 7 Terry plays flugelhorn
- on tracks 5 and 10 Terry sings or mumbles

== CD re-issue ==
The album was re-issued on CD, in a gatefold sleeve, with an additional sleeve-notes booklet, in 1998 by PolyGram. In 2012 it was re-issued by Verve (Universal Music Group).

== Personnel ==
"Blues for Smedley"
Blues for Smedley sample

- Clark Terry – trumpet, flugelhorn, vocal
- Oscar Peterson – piano
- Ray Brown – double bass
- Ed Thigpen – drums
