= Emanuele Maniscalco =

Italian jazz pianist, drummer and composer

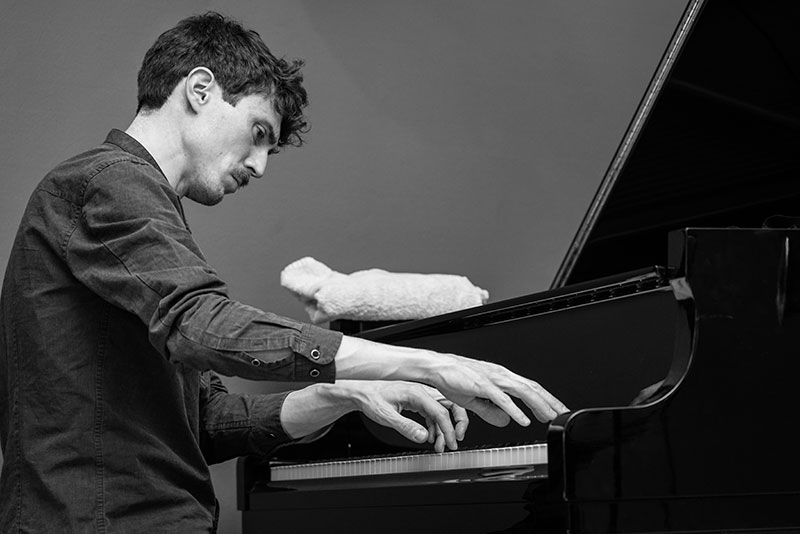
- Maniscalco in Aarhus, Denmark 2019. Photo Hreinn Gudlaugsson

Background information
- Born: 1983 (age 42–43); Brescia, Italy
- Genres: Jazz, Improvised, Alternative
- Occupations: Musician, composer
- Instruments: Piano, drums
- Years active: 2000s–present
- Labels: Aut, ECM

Emanuele Maniscalco (born 1983) is an Italian jazz pianist, drummer and composer.

== Life and career ==
Maniscalco was born in Brescia in 1983. He began playing the piano at the age of 8 and the drums at 12. He is largely self-taught on both instruments, but he attended the monthly workshops of Stefano Battaglia in Siena between 2001 and 2008. He played with trumpeter Enrico Rava between 2004 and 2007.

In 2012, Maniscalco recorded for ECM Records as drummer and co-leader of the trio Third Reel. Two years later, the same group, this time with Maniscalco on piano and drums, recorded Many More Days for ECM.

== Compositions ==
"As early influences on his compositional style he cites Carla Bley, Paul Motian and Charlie Haden."

== Discography ==
An asterisk (*) indicates that the year is that of release.

=== As leader/co-leader ===
Year recorded	Title	Label	Personnel/Notes
2010*	Slow Band	Re:think-art (later Onwire)	Quartet, with Dan Kinzelman (tenor sax, clarinet), Karsten Lipp (guitar), Paolo Biasi (bass); Maniscalco plays drums
2011	From Time to Time	El Gallo Rojo	Trio, with Giulio Corini (bass), Nelide Bandello (drums); Maniscalco plays piano
2012	Third Reel	ECM	As Third Reel; trio, with Nicolas Masson (tenor sax, clarinet), Roberto Pianca (guitar); Maniscalco plays drums
2012	Small Choices	Aut	As Small Choices; trio, with Giacomo Papetti (bass), Gabriele Rubino (piccolo, soprano and bass clarinets); Maniscalco plays piano
2014	Many More Days	ECM	As Third Reel; trio, with Nicolas Masson (tenor sax, soprano sax, clarinet), Roberto Pianca (guitar); Maniscalco plays piano, drums
2014*	Copenhagen Season	ILK	Duo, with Thomas Morgan (bass); Maniscalco plays piano
2015*	From Solesmes to Solanas	self-produced	Solo; Maniscalco plays piano
2015*	Maniscalco, Bigoni, Solborg	ILK	Trio, with Francesco Bigoni (sax, clarinet), Mark Solborg (guitar); Maniscalco plays piano
2015*	Maniscalco/Hedén/Wikenmo	Havtorn Records	Trio, with Ivar Hedén Judt (trumpet), Måns Wikenmo (drums); Maniscalco plays piano
2016*	Emanuele Maniscalco meets Sandro Gibellini	Ritmo&Blu Records	Duo, with Sandro Gibellini (guitar); Maniscalco plays piano
2017*	Birthday	Gotta Let It Out	As Il sogno; trio, with Tomo Jacobson (bass), Oliver Laumann (drums); Maniscalco plays piano

=== As sideman ===
Year recorded	Leader	Title	Label	Notes
2006	Giovanni Guidi	Tomorrow Never Knows	Venus	Maniscalco plays drums
2006	Enrico Rava	Jazz Italiano Live, Vol. 1	Gruppo Repubblica/L'Espresso	Maniscalco plays drums
2007	Walter Beltrami	Piccoli numeri	CAM Jazz	Maniscalco plays drums
2007	Paolo Cattaneo	L'equilibrio non basta	V2/Edel	Maniscalco plays drums, piano
2008	Emanuele Cisi	The Age of Numbers	Auand	Maniscalco plays drums
2008	Ares Tavolazzi	Godot e altre storie di teatro	Dodicilune	Maniscalco plays drums
2009	Walter Beltrami	Timoka	Re:think-art (later Onwire)	Maniscalco plays drums
2009	Stefano Battaglia	Out-vestigation	Jazz Engine	Maniscalco plays drums
2010	Paolo Cattaneo	Adorami e perdonami	Eclectic circus	Maniscalco plays piano
2010	Angela Kinczly	Phoenix EP	Segesto Invenzioni	Maniscalco plays drums
2011	Marco Parente	La riproduzione dei fiori	Woland	Maniscalco plays drums, percussion
2012*	Alessandro Fiori	Questo dolce museo	Urtovox	Maniscalco plays drums, percussion
2014*	Maria Faust	Sacrum Facere	Barefoot Records	Maniscalco plays piano
2014*	Ned Ferm	Spent All the Money	Stunt	Maniscalco plays piano, keyboards
2015*	Ermes Pirlo, Paolo Biasi	Bellow's Training	nBn	Maniscalco plays drums, harmonium
2015	Rafael Schilt	A Sound	Wide Ear Records	Maniscalco plays drums
2016	Andrea Lombardini	Diminuendo	CAM Jazz	Maniscalco plays piano, drums
2016	Paolo Cattaneo	Una piccola tregua	Lavorarestanca	Maniscalco plays piano
2017	Lumina	Lumina	Tuk Music	Maniscalco plays drums, harmonium
