= List of years in jazz =

This page indexes the individual year in jazz pages. Each year is annotated with a significant event as a reference point.

2020s - 2010s - 2000s - 1990s - 1980s - 1970s - 1960s - 1950s - 1940s - 1930s - 1920s - 1910s - 1900s - Pre-1900s

== 2020s ==
- 2024 in jazz
- 2023 in jazz, death of Karl Berger
- 2022 in jazz, death of Grachan Moncur III, Michael Henderson
- 2021 in jazz, death of Chick Corea
- 2020 in jazz, death of Don Burrows

== 2010s ==
- 2019 in jazz, deaths of Alvin Fielder, Chris Wilson, Ethel Ennis, Joseph Jarman, Ken Nordine, Kofi Burbridge, Michel Legrand, Marcel Azzola, Oliver Mtukudzi, Willie Murphy, and Joe McQueen.
- 2018 in jazz, deaths of Algia Mae Hinton, Aretha Franklin, Arthur Maia, Asmund Bjørken, Audrey Morris, Big Bill Bissonnette, Big Jay McNeely, Bill Hughes, Bill Watrous, Billy Hancock, Bob Bain, Bob Cunningham, Bob Dorough, Brian Browne, Brian Rolland, Brooks Kerr, Buell Neidlinger, Calvin Newborn, Cecil Taylor, Charles Neville, Chuck Wilson, Coco Schumann, D. J. Fontana, Didier Lockwood, Duke Carl Gregor of Mecklenburg, Eddie Shaw, Erich Kleinschuster, Errol Buddle, Fedor Frešo, Fred Hess, Gildo Mahones, Gyula Babos, Hamiet Bluiett, Henry Butler, Hugh Masekela, Ivan Smirnov, Jack Costanzo, Jack Reilly, Jerry González, Jerzy Milian, Jim Caine, Jimmy Woods, John "Jabo" Starks, John Von Ohlen, Johnny Maddox, Jon Hiseman, Jon Sholle, Lazy Lester, Leon "Ndugu" Chancler, Lill-Babs, Lorraine Gordon, Maartin Allcock, Marlene VerPlanck, Matt Murphy, Max Bennett, Mikhail Alperin, Miúcha, Morgana King, Nancy Wilson, Norio Maeda, Norman Edge, Olly Wilson, Ove Stokstad, Patrick Williams, Perry Robinson, Peter Guidi, Randy Weston, Ray Thomas, Rebecca Parris, Reggie Lucas, Roger Neumann, Roy Hargrove, Russell Solomon, Shep Shepherd, Sonny Fortune, Stan Reynolds, Tab Hunter, Terry Evans, Theresa Hightower, Theryl DeClouet, Tomasz Stanko, Tommy Banks, Vic Damone, Victor Hayden, Wayne Dockery, and Wesla Whitfield.
- 2017 in jazz, deaths of Al Jarreau, Allan Holdsworth, Andy McGhee, Arthur Blythe, Atle Hammer, Avo Uvezian, Barbara Carroll, Bea Wain, Ben Riley, Bern Nix, Bill Dowdy, Boris Lindqvist, Bruce Hampton, Bruno Canfora, Buck Hill, Buddy Bregman, Buddy Greco, Casey Jones, CeDell Davis, Charles "Bobo" Shaw, Charlie Tagawa, Chris Murrell, Chuck Berry, Chuck Loeb, Chuck Stewart, Clem Curtis, Clyde Stubblefield, Dave Pell, Dave Valentin, David Axelrod, Della Reese, Dick Noel, Dominic Frontiere, Egil Kapstad, Egil Monn-Iversen, Errol Dyers, Fats Domino, Frank Capp, Frank Holder, Fumio Karashima, Geri Allen, Grady Tate, Graham Wood, Gregg Allman, Guitar Gable, Halvard Kausland, Horace Parlan, Ian Cruickshank, J. Geils, Jaki Liebezeit, James Cotton, Janet Seidel, Janne Carlsson, Jimmy Dotson, Jimmy Nalls, John Abercrombie, John Blackwell, John Boudreaux, John Coates Jr., John Critchinson, John Shifflett, John Wetton, Jon Hendricks, Keely Smith, Kevin Mahogany, Knut Borge, Larry Elgart, Laudir de Oliveira, Larry Coryell, Leo Cuypers, Leo Welch, Lonnie Brooks, Lou Gare, Melton Mustafa, Mickey Roker, Mike Carr, Misha Mengelberg, Muhal Richard Abrams, Mundell Lowe, Phil Cohran, Phil Miller, Ralph Carney, Ray Phiri, Robert Popwell, Robert Walker, Rod Mason, Roswell Rudd, Roy Fisher, Skip Prokop, Stan Robinson, Sunny Murray, Svend Asmussen, Thara Memory, Terry Cryer, Thandi Klaasen, Theo Bophela, Toby Smith, Tom McClung, Tom McIntosh, Tommy LiPuma, Tony Terran, Walter Becker, Wendell Eugene, Willie Pickens, and Wilson das Neves.
- 2016 in jazz, deaths of Al Caiola, Alan Haven, Alfredo "Chocolate" Armenteros, Alonzo Levister, Alphonse Mouzon, Bernie Worrell, Betty Loo Taylor, Bhumibol Adulyadej, Bill Henderson, Billy Paul, Bob Cranshaw, Bobby Hutcherson, Bobby Wellins, Buckwheat Zydeco, Buster Cooper, Candye Kane, Charles Davis, Charles Thompson, Carlos Averhoff, Carlton Kitto, Chuck Flores, Claude Williamson, Connie Crothers, Dave Shepherd, David Attwooll, David Baker, Dennis Davis, Derek Smith, Dominic Duval, Don Francks, Don Friedman, Doug Raney, Ernestine Anderson, Frank Sinatra Jr., Fred Nøddelund, Fredrik Norén, Gato Barbieri, Getatchew Mekurya, Greg Lake, Guilherme Franco, Harald Devold, Hod O'Brien, Horacio Salgán, Hubert Giraud, Irving Fields, Ivar Thomassen, Janusz Muniak, Jeremy Steig, Joe Ascione, Joe Temperley, Johannes Bauer, John Chilton, John Fischer, Jon Klette, Karel Růžička, Kay Starr, Keith Emerson, Knut Kiesewetter, Léo Marjane, Leon Russell, Long John Hunter, Louis Smith, Louis Stewart, Mariano Mores, Maurice White, Michael Di Pasqua, Michael White, Mike Daniels, Mike Pedicin, Mose Allison, Naná Vasconcelos, Papa Wemba, Pat Friday, Paul Bley, Pete Fountain, Pete Yellin, Peter Appleyard, Pocho La Pantera, Prince Rogers Nelson, Randy Jones, Roger Cicero, Roland Prince, Rudy Van Gelder, Ryo Fukui, Selçuk Sun, Shelley Moore, Shirley Bunnie Foy, Steve Byrd, Terje Fjærn, Toots Thielemans, Victor Bailey, Willy Andresen, and Zena Latto.
- 2015 in jazz, Eirik Hegdal awarded Jazz Spellemannprisen; deaths of Al Aarons, Andy White, B.B. King, Ben Aronov, Bengt-Arne Wallin, Big Time Sarah, Bob Belden, Bob Parlocha, Clark Terry, Cynthia Robinson, Daevid Allen, Dal Richards, Dave Pike, Don Rendell, Eddy Louiss, Erik Amundsen, Gunther Schuller, Harold Battiste, Harold Ousley, Howard Rumsey, Hugo Rasmussen, Ivan Jullien, James Last, Jazz Summers, Jeff Golub, Jerome Cooper, Joe Houston, John Renbourn, John Taylor, Johnny Helms, Jørgen Ingmann, Kjell Öhman, Larry Rosen, Lew Soloff, Marcus Belgrave, Mark Murphy, Marty Napoleon, Masabumi Kikuchi, Mike Porcaro, Milton DeLugg, Monica Lewis, Nat Peck, Natalie Cole, Nora Brockstedt, Ornette Coleman, Paul Bacon, Paul Jeffrey, Phil Woods, Pino Daniele, Ralph Sharon, Ray Kennedy, Richie Pratt, Rusty Jones, Simon Flem Devold, Slim Richey, Svein Christiansen, Van Alexander, Ward Swingle, William Thomas McKinley, and Wilton Felder.
- 2014 in jazz, Marius Neset and Trondheim Jazz Orchestra awarded Jazz Spellemannprisen; Sigbjørn Apeland awarded Vossajazzprisen; deaths of Aage Teigen, Aaron Sachs, Acker Bilk, Al Belletto, Al Harewood, Alan Davie, Alan Lawrence Turnbull, Alice Babs, Amiri Baraka, Armando Peraza, Arthur Doyle, Benjamín Brea, Billie Rogers, Brian Lemon, Buddy DeFranco, Carlos Emilio Morales, Charlie Haden, Chris White, Edmund Percey, Frank Strazzeri, Frankie Dunlop, Franny Beecher, Fred Ho, Fred Sturm, Gerald Wilson, Giorgio Gaslini, Herb Jeffries, Horace Silver, Idris Muhammad, Jack Bruce, Jackie Cain, Jair Rodrigues, Jim Galloway, Jimmy Scott, Joe Bonner, Joe Sample, Joe Wilder, John Blake Jr., John Ore, Kathy Stobart, Kenny Drew Jr., Kenny Wheeler, King Fleming, Konstantin Orbelyan, Lionel Ferbos, Mats Rondin, Olav Dale, Paco de Lucía, Paul Horn, Pete Seeger, Petr Skoumal, Renato Sellani, Riz Ortolani, Ronnie Bedford, Ronny Jordan, Roy Campbell Jr., Roy Crimmins, Sam Ulano, Tim Hauser, Vic Ash, and Wayne Henderson.
- 2013 in jazz, Karin Krog and John Surman awarded Jazz Spellemannprisen, Tore Brunborg awarded Vossajazzprisen; deaths of Al Porcino, Alvin Lee, Armando Trovajoli, Bebo Valdés, Ben Tucker, Bengt Hallberg, Bernie McGann, Brian Brown, Butch Morris, Butch Warren, Carline Ray, Cedar Walton, Chico Hamilton, Claude Nobs, Don Blackman, Don Shirley, Donald Bailey, Donald Byrd, Donna Hightower, Dwayne Burno, Ed Shaughnessy, Enzo Jannacci, Frank Wess, George Duke, Gia Maione, Gloria Lynne, Henrik Otto Donner, Herb Geller, Jane Harvey, Jim Hall, Jimmy Ponder, Johnny Smith, Kaj Backlund, Kalaparusha Maurice McIntyre, Kenny Ball, Linda Vogt, Lindsay Cooper, Marian McPartland, Melvin Rhyne, Mulgrew Miller, Pat Halcox, Paul Kuhn, Paul Smith, Phil Ramone, Red Balaban, Rita Reys, Rolf Graf, Rolv Wesenlund, Ronald Shannon Jackson, Rudolf Dašek, Sam Most, Sathima Bea Benjamin, Sonny Russo, Steve Berrios, Stewart "Dirk" Fischer, Stan Tracey, Terry Devon, Terry Lightfoot, Tom Parker, Tommy Whittle, Trigger Alpert, Yngve Moe, and Yusef Lateef.
- 2012 in jazz, Sidsel Endresen and Stian Westerhus awarded Jazz Spellemannprisen, Tore Brunborg awarded Buddyprisen; deaths of Andy Hamilton, Austin Peralta, Ayten Alpman, Bernardo Sassetti, Billy Bean, Bob Badgley, Borah Bergman, Byard Lancaster, Dave Brubeck, Candy Johnson, Carlos Azevedo, Clare Fischer, David S. Ware, Don Bagley, Ed Cassidy, Ed Lincoln, Eddie Bert, Eddie Harvey, Eivin One Pedersen, Erik Moseholm, Ernie Carson, Etta James, Flavio Ambrosetti, Frances Klein, Frank Marocco, Frank Parr, Fritz Pauer, Frode Thingnæs, Graeme Bell, Hal McKusick, Harry Betts, Herbie Harper, Jacky June, Jayne Cortez, Joe Muranyi, John C. Marshall, John Levy, John Tchicai, Kay Davis, Keshav Sathe, Larance Marable, Leon Spencer, Lionel Batiste, Lol Coxhill, Lucio Dalla, Margie Hyams, Mickey Baker, Mike Melvoin, Noel Kelehan, Pete Cosey, Pete La Roca, Peter Boothman, Red Holloway, Rodgers Grant, Roland Shaw, Rune Gustafsson, Stan Greig, Steven Springer, Tale Ognenovski, Ted Curson, Teddy Charles, Tomasz Szukalski, Totti Bergh, Victor Gaskin, Virgil Jones, and Von Freeman.
- 2011 in jazz, Ola Kvernberg awarded Jazz Spellemannprisen; Mari Kvien Brunvoll awarded Vossajazzprisen; deaths of Alys Robi, Amy Winehouse, André Hodeir, Beryl Davis, Bill Tapia, Billy Bang, Bob Flanigan, Bob Brookmeyer, Butch Ballard, Cesária Évora, Charles Fambrough, Christiane Legrand, Charlie Callas, Cornell Dupree, Dinah Kaye, Eugenio Toussaint, Frank Foster, Eddie Marshall, George Shearing, Gordon Beck, Graham Collier, György Szabados, Harald Johnsen, Jack Kevorkian, Jens Winther, Jiří Traxler, Joe Lee Wilson, Joe Morello, Johnny Răducanu, Lars Sjösten, Lucy Ann Polk, Melvin Sparks, Michael Garrick, Milton Babbitt, Norma Zimmer, Ottilie Patterson, Papa Bue, Paul Motian, Paul Weeden, Phoebe Snow, Ralph MacDonald, Ray Bryant, Roger Williams, Ross McManus, Russell Garcia, Sam Rivers, Snooky Young, Ted Nash, Tom Vaughn, Tony Levin, and Walter Norris.

== 2000s ==
- 2009 in jazz, deaths of Abu Talib, Al Martino, Arthur Jenkins, Blossom Dearie, Bobby Graham, Bud Shank, Buddy Montgomery, Charlie Kennedy, Charlie Mariano, Chris Connor, Coleman Mellett, David "Fathead" Newman, Dick Katz, Eddie Bo, Eddie Higgins, Eddie Locke, Eddie Preston, Fats Sadi, George Russell, Gerhard Aspheim, Gerry Niewood, Gugge Hedrenius, Hale Smith, Hank Crawford, Harrison Ridley Jr., Haydain Neale, Herbie Lovelle, Hugh Hopper, Ian Carr, Jack Nimitz, Jarmo Savolainen, Jeff Clyne, Jerry van Rooyen, Jim Chapin, Joe Cuba, Joe Maneri, Kenny Rankin, Kitty White, Kjell Bartholdsen, Koko Taylor, Lars Erstrand, Leonard Gaskin, Les Paul, Louie Bellson, Luther Thomas, Lyman Woodard, Mat Mathews, Moultrie Patten, Nunzio Rotondo, Orlando "Cachaito" López, Pete King, Pocho Lapouble, Rashied Ali, Raymond Berthiaume, Rusty Dedrick, Sam Butera, Sirone, Snooks Eaglin, Sonny Bradshaw, Sonny Dallas, Su Cruickshank, Terry Pollard, Tina Marsh, Tito Alberti, Tom McGrath, Uli Trepte, Vic Lewis, Viktor Paskov, Wayman Tisdale, Whitey Mitchell, Winston Mankunku Ngozi, and Zeke Zarchy.
- 2008 in jazz, deaths of Alfred Gallodoro, Allan Ganley, Anca Parghel, Arne Domnérus, Bheki Mseleku, Bill Finegan, Bill Saragih, Bob Florence, Bobby Durham, Bobby Tucker, Byrdie Green, Cachao López, Chalmers Alford, Campbell Burnap, Chris Anderson, Connie Haines, Danny Moss, Dave McKenna, Dennis Irwin, Derek Wadsworth, Dick Charlesworth, Dick Sudhalter, Earl Palmer, Eartha Kitt, Eivind Solberg, Esbjörn Svensson, Franz Jackson, Freddie Hubbard, Gene Allen, Géo Voumard, Gerald Wiggins, Guy Warren, Hal Stein, Harald Heide-Steen Jr., Henri Salvador, Henry Adler, Hiram Bullock, Humphrey Lyttelton, Irene Reid, Jackie Orszaczky, Jeff Healey, Jerry Wexler, Jim Aton, Jimmy Carl Black, Jimmy Cleveland, Jimmy Giuffre, Jimmy Gourley, Jimmy McGriff, Joe Beck, John Brunious, Johnny Griffin, Keith Smith, Kenny Cox, Lee Young, LeRoi Moore, Marc Moulin, Mario Schiano, Merl Saunders, Miles Kington, Miriam Makeba, Monty Waters, Nat Temple, Neal Hefti, Page Cavanaugh, Patti Bown, Pekka Pohjola, Pete Candoli, Pete Chilver, Phil Urso, Pierre Van Dormael, Prince Lasha, Ray Ellis, Richard Wright, Ronnie Mathews, Salah Ragab, Steve Harris, Teo Macero, Tommy McQuater, Tony Reedus, Verne Byers, Walt Dickerson, and Yusuf Salim.
- 2007 in jazz, deaths of Al Arsenault, Al Viola, Aldemaro Romero, Alice Coltrane, Alvin Batiste, Andrew Hill, Art Davis, Bill Barber, Bobby Rosengarden, Buddy Childers, Carla White, Carlos Valdes, Cecil Payne, Dakota Staton, Danny Barcelona, Dick Wetmore, Don Mumford, Donald Ayler, Doug Riley, Eldee Young, Emil Mijares, Ernest "Doc" Paulin, Frank Morgan, George Melly, Grethe Kausland, Herb Pomeroy, Herman Riley, Hitoshi Ueki, Jack Wilson, Jimmy Cheatham, Joe Zawinul, Johnny Frigo, Jon Lucien, Jon Marks, Juma Santos, Leroy Jenkins, Lloyd Trotman, Mario Rivera, Max Roach, Michael Brecker, Mike Osborne, Nellie Lutcher, Nükhet Ruacan, Oscar Peterson, Paul Rutherford, Ronaldo Folegatti, Sal Mosca, Specs Powell, Teresa Brewer, Tommy Newsom, Tony Scott, Virtue Hampton Whitted, and Whitney Balliett.
- 2006 in jazz, deaths of Aladár Pege, Anita O'Day, Art Murphy, Barry Buckley, Bill Miller, Bobby Byrne, Charles Turner, Charles W. LaRue, Claude Luter, Dave Black, Dewey Redman, Don Alias, Don Butterfield, Duke Jordan, Ed Summerlin, Elton Dean, Etta Baker, Hilton Ruiz, Ian Hamer, Irv Kluger, Jack Montrose, Jackie McLean, Jay McShann, Jean-Pierre Gebler, Joan C. Edwards, John Burch, John G. Blowers Jr., John Hicks, Don Lusher, Kenneth Sivertsen, Kenny Davern, Lou Rawls, Malachi Thompson, Martha Tilton, Maynard Ferguson, Michael S. Smith, Mick Mulligan, Miguel "Angá" Díaz, Narvin Kimball, Oscar Klein, Pip Pyle, Pupo De Luca, Putte Wickman, Raphe Malik, Rauno Lehtinen, Ray Barretto, Richard Dunbar, Roland Alexander, Romano Mussolini, Ross Tompkins, Rufus Harley, Ruth Brown, Sherman Ferguson, Shungo Sawada, Sivuca, Sonny Cohn, Steve Marcus, Takehiro Honda, Timothy J. Tobias, Tommy Watt, Vlasta Průchová, Walt Harper, and Walter Booker; birth of Angelina Jordan.
- 2005 in jazz, deaths of Al Casey, Al McKibbon, Albert Mangelsdorff, Alfredo Rodríguez, Andrew Bisset, Arnie Lawrence, Basil Kirchin, Benny Bailey, Bill DeArango, Bill Potts, Billy Amstell, Billy Bauer, Blue Barron, Bob Enevoldsen, Charlie Norman, Derek Bailey, Dianne Brooks, Dom Um Romão, Elmer Dresslar Jr., Earl Zindars, Francy Boland, Georges Arvanitas, Glenn Corneille, Harry Gold, Harry Pepl, Humphrey Carpenter, Jack Lesberg, Jimmy Smith, Jimmy Woode, John Stubblefield, José Melis, Keter Betts, Larry Bunker, Lucky Thompson, Mikkel Flagstad, Monica Zetterlund, Niels-Henning Ørsted Pedersen, Oleg Lundstrem, Oscar Brown, Pam Bricker, Per Henrik Wallin, Percy Heath, Roy Brooks, Shirley Horn, Stan Levey, Ted Greene, Tom Talbert, and Victor Sproles.
- 2004 in jazz, deaths of Anthony Lacen, Artie Shaw, Barney Kessel, Bent Jædig, Bill Eyden, Billy May, Billy "Uke" Scott, Bjørnar Andresen, Bob Maize, Calvin Jones, Coleridge-Taylor Perkinson, Colin Smith, Cy Coleman, Dick Heckstall-Smith, Don Cornell, Don Tosti, Ella Johnson, Elvin Jones, Frank Isola, Frank Mantooth, G. T. Hogan, Gil Coggins, Gil Mellé, Gordon Brisker, Hank Garland, Hank Marr, Illinois Jacquet, J. R. Mitchell, Jack Sperling, Jackie Paris, James Williams, Jimmy Coe, Joe Bushkin, Joe Kennedy Jr., Joe Springer, John Guerin, John LaPorta, John Mayer, John R. T. Davies, Louis Satterfield, Lucille Dixon Robertson, Malachi Favors, Mark Ledford, Max Geldray, Michel Colombier, Milt Bernhart, Neil Ardley, Pete Jolly, Pete Strange, Preston Love, Randolph Colville, Ray Charles, Rick Henderson, Robin Kenyatta, Sigurd Køhn, Steve Lacy, Tony Lee, Tony Mottola, Vernon Alley, Waldren Joseph, Wallace Davenport, and Walter Perkins.
- 2003 in jazz, deaths of Aaron Bell, Aaron Bridgers, Allen Eager, Alvin Alcorn, Artie Shapiro, Benny Carter, Bill Perkins, Bross Townsend, Buddy Arnold, Carl Fontana, Charlie Biddle, Chris McGale, Chubby Jackson, Cy Touff, Don Lamond, Don Lanphere, Eddie Gladden, Eraldo Volonté, Frank Lowe, Gary King, Grover Mitchell, Hans Koller, Harold Ashby, Herbie Mann, Herbie Steward, Jacques Butler, Jed Williams, Jerry Rusch, Jimmy Knepper, John Brimhall, John Serry Sr., Linton Garner, Luther Henderson, Maxine Daniels, Mongo Santamaría, Nina Simone, Norman O'Connor, Peanuts Hucko, Ramon Carranza, Ron Collier, Ruby Braff, Rudolf Tomsits, Ted Joans, Teddy Edwards, Volker Kriegel, Wayne Andre, Webster Young, and William Russo; birth of Joey Alexander.
- 2002 in jazz, deaths of Arvell Shaw, Bill Berry, Bjørn Johansen, Bob Berg, Bubba Brooks, Chico O'Farrill, Chris Columbus, Chuck Domanico, Claudio Slon, Curtis Amy, Cy Laurie, Dave Van Ronk, Dodo Marmarosa, Dudley Moore, Ellis Larkins, Frank Hewitt, Hadda Brooks, Helmut Zacharias, Henri Renaud, Idrees Sulieman, Jimmy Maxwell, John McLevy, John Patton, Lionel Hampton, Lonnie Donegan, Lou Stein, Mal Waldron, Marion Montgomery, Mel Stewart, Mose Vinson, Nick Brignola, Noel DaCosta, Peggy Lee, Pete Jacobsen, Peter Kowald, Ray Brown, Remo Palmier, Roland Hanna, Ronnie Verrell, Roy Kral, Russ Freeman, Shirley Scott, Stanley Black, Stella Brooks, Streamline Ewing, Susie Garrett, Truck Parham, Webster Lewis, Weldon Irvine, Wendell Marshall, and Wilber Morris.
- 2001 in jazz, deaths of Al Hibbler, Babik Reinhardt, Bill Le Sage, Billy Higgins, Billy Maxted, Billy Mitchell, Buddy Tate, Cal Collins, Chet Atkins, Conte Candoli, Eric Allandale, Etta Jones, Flip Phillips, Frankie Carle, Gene Taylor, George T. Simon, Glauco Masetti, Harold Land, Herbie Jones, J. J. Johnson, Jack McDuff, Jay Cameron, Jay Migliori, Joe Henderson, John Collins, John Lewis, Ken Rattenbury, Larry Adler, Les Brown, Lindsay L. Cooper, Lorez Alexandria, Lou Levy, Makanda Ken McIntyre, Manny Albam, Moe Koffman, Moses Taiwa Molelekwa, Norris Turney, Oliver Todd, Panama Francis, Ralph Burns, Ralph Sutton, Ray Arvizu, Sil Austin, Sonya Hedenbratt, Spike Robinson, Stan Freeman, Susannah McCorkle, and Tommy Flanagan; birth of Emily Bear.
- 2000 in jazz, deaths of Akira Miyazawa, Al Grey, Baden Powell, Billy Munn, Britt Woodman, Bruno Martino, Buzzy Drootin, Cab Kaye, Clint Houston, Dick Morrissey, Don Abney, Gene Harris, George Finola, Glenn Horiuchi, Gus Johnson, Hidehiko Matsumoto, Jack Nitzsche, Jeanne Lee, Jerome Richardson, Jonah Jones, Julie London, Lin Halliday, Nat Adderley, Neal Creque, Nick Fatool, Ole Jacob Hansen, Pat Flowers, Pete Minger, Randi Hultin, Roger Frampton, Rosa King, Si Zentner, Stanley Turrentine, Steve Allen, Sture Nordin, Svein Finnerud, Teri Thornton, Tito Puente, Vernel Fournier, Walter Benton, Willie Cook, and Wilson Simonal, Gerald "Buzzy" Goff

== 1990s ==
- 1999 in jazz, deaths of Al Hirt, Andy Simpkins, Anna Mae Winburn, Arnold Fishkind, Art Farmer, Betty Roché, Bobby Troup, Candy Candido, Charles Earland, Charles Rogers, Charlie Byrd, Chuck Higgins, Clifford Jarvis, Colin Purbrook, Curtis Mayfield, Donald Mills, Edward Vesala, Ernie Wilkins, Fausto Papetti, Freddy Randall, Gar Samuelson, Grover Washington Jr., Helen Forrest, Henry Nemo, Herman Foster, Horace Tapscott, Jaki Byard, Jesse Stone, Jimmy Roberts, Joe Williams, John Benson Brooks, John Roache, Julius Wechter, Kenny Baker, LaMont Johnson, Lauderic Caton, Leon Thomas, Leroy Vinnegar, Lester Bowie, Manfredo Fest, Mel Tormé, Melba Liston, Michel Petrucciani, Milt Jackson, Moondog, Red Norvo, Richard B. Boone, Rick Fay, Rosy McHargue, Sam Ranelli, Spiegle Willcox, Sal Salvador, Sweets Edison, Talib Dawud, Teddy McRae, Terry Rosen, Tony Crombie, Trudy Desmond, Walt Levinsky, Warren Covington, Wyatt Ruther, and Yehudi Menuhin; birth of Tom Ibarra.
- 1998 in jazz, deaths of Alvin Tyler, Andrzej Trzaskowski, Anselmo Sacasas, Attila Zoller, Barrett Deems, Benny Green, Benny Waters, Beryl Bryden, Betty Carter, Blue Lu Barker, Bob Haggart, Bob Hames, Bobby Bryant, Carl Barriteau, Dave Schildkraut, David Earle Johnson, Denis Charles, Dick Grove, Dorothy Donegan, Dorothy Sloop, Egil Johansen, Errol Parker, Frank Sinatra, George Kelly, George Van Eps, Glenn Spearman, Guy Lafitte Harry Lookofsky, Helen Ward, Jimmy Butts, Jimmy Campbell, Jimmy Henderson, Jimmy Skidmore, Joe Dixon, Kenny Kirkland, Linda Hayes, Marzette Watts, Mel Powell, Milton Adolphus, Milton Banana, Nat Gonella, Nick Webb, Orlando DiGirolamo, Raymond Premru, Red Richards, Robert Normann, Roland Alphonso, Sherwood Johnson, Spencer Clark, Syd Lawrence, Tal Farlow, Ted Dunbar, Thomas Chapin, Tim Maia, Tom Cora, Tommy Pederson, and Walter Bishop Jr.; birth of Sasha Berliner.
- 1997 in jazz, deaths of Anne Lenner, Arthur Prysock, Bernard Anderson, Beverly Peer, Big Nick Nicholas, Carola Standertskjöld, Carson Smith, Charles Moffett, Chuck Andrus, Chuck Wayne, Dardanelle Hadley, Dick Marx, Dick Shearer, Doc Cheatham, Duncan Swift, Eddie Jones Eric Von Essen, Fela Kuti, George Chisholm, George Handy, Horst Lippmann, Hugh Lawson, Jimmy Witherspoon, Joe Roccisano, Johnny "Hammond" Smith, Johnny Coles, Johnny Mince, Lou Bennett, Louis Barbarin, Mouse Randolph, Rolf Ericson, Seldon Powell, Shake Keane, Stan Barker, Stéphane Grappelli, Tete Montoliu, Thelma Carpenter, Thurman Green, Tommy Tedesco, Tommy Turrentine, Tony Williams, Wally Rose, and Zachary Breaux; birth of Barbra Lica.
- 1996 in jazz, deaths of Alan Dawson, Alan Littlejohn, Amancio D'Silva, Art Porter Jr., Barney Wilen, Bill Doggett, Billy Byers, Bobby Cole, Bobby Enriquez, Carlos Vidal Bolado, Carmell Jones, Don Grolnick, Eddie Harris, Ella Fitzgerald, Eva Cassidy, Frankie Sakai, Fred Adison, Gerry Mulligan, Gus Bivona, Herb Hall, Howard Wyeth, Ike Isaacs, Jimmy Rowles, Johnny Costa, Kid Sheik, Mercer Ellington, Milt Larkin, Morty Corb, Norma Teagarden, Oscar Valdambrini, Paul Weston, Pauline Braddy, Pim Jacobs, Pud Brown, Ray Leatherwood, Ray Linn, Ronnie Scott, Tiny Winters, and Viatcheslav Nazarov; births of Alexander Bone, Connie Han, and Dionne Bromfield.
- 1995 in jazz, deaths of Aimé Barelli, Art Taylor, Bucky Calabrese, Chris Pyne, Chuck Greenberg, Danilo Terenzi, Dean Martin, Don Cherry, Don Goldie, Don Pullen, Earl Coleman, Earle Warren, Ginger Smock, Gustav Brom, Herbie Phillips, Jacques Denjean, Jess Stacy, Jimmy D'Aquisto, Jimmy Raney, John Gilmore, John Sangster, Johnny Bothwell, Johnny Lytle, Josette Daydé, Junior Walker, Julius Hemphill, Kansas Fields, Karl Drewo, Larry Gales, Laurindo Almeida, Lenny Hambro, Les Elgart, Marshall Royal, Marty Paich, Max Brüel, Mick Pyne, Minoru Matsuya, Percy Humphrey, Phil Harris, Phyllis Hyman, Ralph Flanagan, Ray McKinley, Roger Chaput, Rozelle Claxton, Shoji Suzuki, Vivian Stanshall, Wild Bill Davis, and Wilton Gaynair; births of Alma Macbride, and Andrea Motis.
- 1994 in jazz, deaths of Al Levitt, Antonio Carlos Jobim, Bernie Leighton, Bill Douglass, Billy Usselton, Bob Lively, Cab Calloway, Carmen McRae, Charles Redland, Connie Kay, Danny Barker, Danny Gatton, David van Kriedt, Dennis Berry, Dick Cary, Eric Gale, Gene Cherico, Gil Fuller, Henry Mancini, Jack Bentley, Jack Sharpe, Jacques Pelzer, James Clay, Jean Omer, Jimmy Hamilton, Joe Pass, John Neely, John Stevens, Lanny Steele, Leonard Feather, Lex Humphries, Lionel Grigson, Mary Ann McCall, Maurice Purtill, Max Kaminsky, Moe Purtill, Noel Pointer, Oliver Jackson, Rafig Babayev, Ralph Ellison, Red Rodney, Rowland Greenberg, Scoville Browne, Shorty Rogers, Sonny Sharrock, Teddy Buckner, Thore Ehrling, Tiny Davis, Tommy Benford, and Willie Humphrey; births of Billie Black, Jo David Meyer Lysne, Gentle Bones, Nikki Yanofsky, Signe Førre, and Veronica Swift.
- 1993 in jazz, deaths of Adelaide Hall, Adele Girard, Ahmed Abdul-Malik, Al Fairweather, Alan Clare, Ann Ronell, Art Hodes, Art Porter Sr., Billy Eckstine, Bjarne Liller, Bob Carter, Bob Cooper, Bob Crosby, Bruce Turner, Carter Jefferson, Charles Greenlee, Clifford Jordan, Dick Cathcart, Dizzy Gillespie, Don Myrick, Dupree Bolton, Eddie Calhoun, Elek Bacsik, Elmer Crumbley, Emmett Berry, Erskine Hawkins, Eva Olmerová, Frank Zappa, Fraser MacPherson, Gene Leis, Gene Porter, George Wallington, Greely Walton, Harper Goff, Herman Fowlkes Jr., J. R. Monterose, Jake Porter, Jimmy Deuchar, John Jenkins, Juice Wilson, Kenny Drew, Lebert Lombardo, Leon "Pee Wee" Whittaker, Louie Ramirez, Mario Bauza, Max Jones, Rich Matteson, Ryoichi Hattori, Sammy Lowe, Singleton Palmer, Steve Jordan, Sun Ra, Teddy Powell, and Thomas A. Dorsey; births of Alice Phoebe Lou, Arianna Neikrug, Fredrik Halland, Narelle Kheng, and Rohey Taalah.
- 1992 in jazz, deaths of Alfred "Chico" Alvarez, Alvin Stoller, Andy Kirk, Big Miller, Boogie Woogie Red, Charlie Ventura, Denny Wright, Don Lang, Ed Blackwell, Gary Windo, George Adams, George Morrow, Hachidai Nakamura, Hal Russell, Hugh Gibb, Jim Pepper, Joe Newman, John Carisi, Johnny Letman, June Tyson, Junior Cook, Leon Abramson, Luiz Eça, Marilyn Moore, Monty Budwig, Nat Pierce, Phillip Wilson, Ray Abrams, Red Callender, Red Mitchell, Sammy Price, Sylvia Syms, Teddy Riley, and Willie Dixon; births of Alf Hulbækmo, Axel Skalstad, Elisabeth Lid Trøen, Gismo Graf, Kristian B. Jacobsen, Lukas Zabulionis, Mathias Stubø, and Siril Malmedal Hauge.
- 1991 in jazz, deaths of Barry Rogers, Beaver Harris, Billy Butler, Bjarne Nerem, Bob Wallis, Buck Clayton, Bud Freeman, Buster Smith, Charlie Barnet, Charlie Beal, Eddie Barefield, Harry Gibson, Jeri Southern, John Carter, Jon Eardley, Kenny Trimble, King Kolax, Kjetil Mulelid, Lance Hayward, Pat Patrick, Leo Wright, Masayuki Takayanagi, Miles Copeland Jr., Miles Davis, Ove Lind, Richard Holmes, Ronnie Ross, Rusty Bryant, Sal Nistico, Slim Gaillard, Stan Getz, Stu Williamson, Tío Tom, and Tullio Mobiglia; births of Ai Kuwabara, Andreas Skår Winther, Bendik Baksaas, Henrik Lødøen, Jean Rondeau, Jimmy Macbride, Kjetil Mulelid, Magnus Bakken, Nathan Hartono, Olli Soikkeli, and Will Heard.
- 1990 in jazz, deaths of Al Sears, Art Blakey, Arthur Österwall, Asser Fagerström, Bernard Addison, Betty Glamann, Bill Hardman, Buschi Niebergall, Chester Zardis, Chris McGregor, Clyde McCoy, Dave Wilkins, Dexter Gordon, Dudu Pukwana, Eje Thelin, Elizete Cardoso, Emily Remler, Francis Coppieters, Frank Wright, Freddie Kohlman, Fritz Schulz-Reichel, George Desmond Hodnett, Georgie Auld, Harry Leahey, Harry South, Howard Roberts, Hubert Rostaing, Jack Noren, Joe Turner, John Madrid, June Christy, King Perry, Lee Castle, Lou Blackburn, Louis Nelson, Lowell Davidson, Major Holley, Mel Lewis, Pearl Bailey, Peter van Steeden, Phil Napoleon, Russell Jacquet, Sam Taylor, Sammy Davis Jr., Sarah Vaughan, Sing Miller, Walter Davis Jr., William Leavitt, and Xavier Cugat; births Alper Tuzcu, Austin Peralta, Benjamin Kheng, Charlotte Dos Santos, Corrie Dick, Diknu Schneeberger, Jonathan Barber, Jonathan Chua, Kimbra Lee Johnson, Laura Jurd, Marthe Wang, Martin Masakowski, Mette Henriette, Ole Mofjell, Rita Ora, Sandra Riley Tang, Sebastian Nordström, and Torgeir Standal.

== 1980s ==
- 1989 in jazz, deaths of Alan Murphy, Ann Burton, Arnett Cobb, Arthur Rhames, Burt Bales, Clifford Thornton, Eddie Heywood, Eric Dixon, Fred Lange-Nielsen, Freddie Waits, Karel Velebný, Kenny Hagood, Kristoffer Eikrem, Les Spann, Marek Blizinski, Nara Leão, Phineas Newborn, Jr., Roberto Nicolosi, Roy Eldridge, Sahib Shihab, Steve McCall, Teddy Brannon, Tiny Grimes, Will Bradley, and Woody Shaw; births of Cécile McLorin Salvant, Christian Skår Winther, Francesco Cafiso, Hans Hulbækmo, Isfar Sarabski, Jakob Terjesønn Rypdal, James Mainwaring, KeyLiza, Magnus Skavhaug Nergaard, and Trond Bersu.
- 1988 in jazz, deaths of Al Cohn, Al Hall, Alan Shorter, Allan Reuss, Barney Josephson, Bill Beason, Billy Butterfield, Charlie Rouse, Chet Baker, Dannie Richmond, Don Patterson, Ed Burke, Eddie Cano, Eddie Vinson, Edward Inge, Gene Quill, Gil Evans, Harry Babasin, Irene Higginbotham, J. C. Heard, Janika Balázs, Joe Albany, Joe Comfort, Joe Loco, Kai Ewans, Ken Colyer, Lawrence Brown, Martin Slavin, Miff Görling, Mousey Alexander, Peck Morrison, Peggy Mann, Pony Poindexter, Priscilla Bowman, Ray Bauduc, Ricky May, Rogier van Otterloo, Rudy Collins, Sam Woodyard, Sy Oliver, Thore Swanerud, Tommy Potter, and Tony Aless; births of Andreas Wildhagen, Brittany Anjou, Casimir Liberski, Christian Meaas Svendsen, David Aleksander Sjølie, Eliza Doolittle, Fredrik Luhr Dietrichson, Guilherme Rodrigues, Jan Martin Gismervik, Kelly Sweet, Kjetil Jerve, Martina Bárta, Melissa Aldana, Milo Lombardi, Natalie Sandtorv, Nitcho Reinhardt, Pannonica de Koenigswarter, Sam Mtukudzi, Sandra Nankoma, Simon Gore, Thomai Apergi, and Victoria Hart.
- 1987 in jazz, deaths of Alfred Lion, Allan Jaffe, August Rosenbaum, Booty Wood, Buddy Rich, Dick Wellstood, Eddie Durham, Frank Rehak, Freddie Green, Harold Vick, Howard McGhee, Irving Ashby, Jaco Pastorius, Joe Mondragon, John Hubbard Beecher, John Malachi, Jorge Dalto, Maxine Sullivan, Norman Harris, Pete Carpenter, Phil Moore, Spike Hughes, Turk Murphy, Victor Feldman, Warne Marsh, Wilbur Little, Willis Jackson, and Woody Herman; births of André Drage, Anja Lauvdal, Bjørn Marius Hegge, Bjørnar Kaldefoss Tveite, Cory Henry, Eldar Djangirov, Evelina Sašenko, Hanna Paulsberg, Hanne Kalleberg, Harald Lassen, Heida Mobeck, Jamison Ross, Joss Stone, Julian Lage, Kaja Draksler, Kim-Erik Pedersen, Luísa Sobral, Mario Tomić, Marte Eberson, Oscar Grönberg, Robert De Kers, Shai Maestro, Thea Hjelmeland, Thana Alexa, Trygve Waldemar Fiske, and Typh Barrow.
- 1986 in jazz, deaths of Alan Branscombe, Arthur Rosebery, Bea Booze, Benny Goodman, Billy Taylor, Christer Boustedt, Cliff Leeman, Cliff Townshend, Curley Russell, Don Wilkerson, Dorothy Ashby, Eddie Davis, Everett Barksdale, Fred Hunt, Fred Stone, Hank Mobley, Jimmy Lyons, Joe Farrell, Johnny Dyani, Karel Vlach, Ken Moule, Knocky Parker, Marky Markowitz, Murray Kane, Paul Bascomb, Pepper Adams, Raymond Burke, Svein Øvergaard, Teddy Kotick, Teddy Wilson, Thad Jones, Thorgeir Stubø, and Walter Wanderley; births of Adam Bałdych, Adrián Carrio, Ayumi Tanaka, Ellen Andrea Wang, Emilie Stoesen Christensen, Ivan Blomqvist, Jakop Janssønn Hauan, Jon Audun Baar, Jon Batiste, Jonas Kilmork Vemøy, Julia Kadel, Justin Kauflin, Kit Downes, Lars Ove Fossheim, Laura Mvula, Nikola Rachelle, Philip Schjetlein, Rebecca Ferguson, Romano Ricciardi, Roxy Coss, Sasha Masakowski, Takashi Matsunaga, Tal Wilkenfeld, and Theo Jackson.
- 1985 in jazz, deaths of Benny Morton, Big Joe Turner, Blind John Davis, Calvin Jackson, Cedric Wallace, Charlie Holmes, Charlie Munro, Chris Woods, Cie Frazier, Cootie Williams, David "Buck" Wheat, Dick Vance, Dicky Wells, Ed Lewis, Frank Traynor, George Clarke, George Duvivier, Georgie Stoll, Irving Mills, Jo Jones, Joe Darensbourg, Johnny Desmond, Johnny Guarnieri, Kenny Clare, Kenny Clarke, Leon Prima, Little Brother Montgomery, Lonnie Hillyer, Max Miller, Nelson Boyd, Nick Ceroli, Philly Joe Jones, Ray Ellington, Richard Williams, Sam Wooding, Sandy Block, Shizuko Kasagi, Skeeter Best, and Zoot Sims; births of Aaron Diehl, Aaron Weinstein, Alexa Ray Joel, André Roligheten, Camila Meza, Dario Chiazzolino, David Six, Ellen Brekken, Eyolf Dale, Ine Hoem, Jon Rune Strøm, Kim Johannesen, Kristoffer Lo, Live Foyn Friis, Marius Neset, Melody Gardot, Newton Faulkner, Odd Steinar Albrigtsen, Olivia Trummer, Øystein Skar, Paul Carnegie-Jones, Per Arne Ferner, Rachael Price, Theo Croker, Tom Harrison, Tore Sandbakken, and Ximena Sariñana.
- 1984 in jazz, deaths of Albert Dailey, Alberta Hunter, Bill Stapleton, Budd Johnson, Claude Hopkins, Count Basie, Dill Jones, Don Elliott, Eddie Beal, Elmon Wright, Esther Phillips, Ethel Azama, Frank Butler, Gene Ramey, George Fierstone, Herman Sherman, Jiří Jelínek, John Mehegan, Juan Tizol, Kjeld Bonfils, Lenny Breau, Mabel Mercer, Ray Copeland, Red Garland, Ronnie Ball, Shelly Manne, Thore Jederby, Trummy Young, and Vic Dickenson; births of Andrea Rydin Berge, Anja Eline Skybakmoen, Anthony Strong, Cyrille Aimée, David Helbock, David Lyttle, Esperanza Spalding, Fredrika Stahl, Frida Ånnevik, Jason Nazary, Jo Berger Myhre, Jo Skaansar, John Escreet, Jørgen Mathisen, Katie Melua, Kristoffer Kompen, Linda Oh, Lucia Cadotsch, Mari Kvien Brunvoll, Obenewa, Sheila Permatasaka, Shinya Fukumori, Sitti Navarro, Steinar Aadnekvam, Trond Bersu, Yvonnick Prene, and Zara McFarlane.
- 1983 in jazz, death of Al Lucas, Arthur Herzog Jr., Barry Galbraith, Bob Cornford, Cag Cagnolatti, Chris Wood, Dolo Coker, Don Ewell, Earl Hines, Ernie Royal, Eubie Blake, Gigi Gryce, Harry James, James Booker, John Ouwerx, Johnny Hartman, Kai Winding, Kamil Běhounek, Ken Kersey, Kippie Moeketsi, Lammar Wright Jr., Marshall Brown, Moses Allen, Paul Quinichette, Roy Milton, Sadik Hakim, Sandy Mosse, Sweet Emma Barrett, Waymon Reed, and Willie Bobo; births of Amy Winehouse, Andreas Stensland Løwe, Andreas Ulvo, Bez Idakula, Christian Scott, David Virelles, Eivind Lønning, Emanuele Maniscalco, Espen Berg, Gard Nilssen, Guro Skumsnes Moe, Hayden Powell, Jaimie Branch, Jamie Brooks, Lars Winther, Lauren Kinsella, Lőrinc Barabás, Magnus Hjorth, Nikoletta Szőke, Pat Smythe, Petter Eldh, Rune Nergaard, Sofia Jernberg, Svein Magnus Furu, and Tom Hasslan.
- 1982 in jazz, deaths of Al Haig, Al Hayse, Al Rinker, Alex Welsh, Art Pepper, Bernie Glow, Big Joe Williams, Cal Tjader, Elis Regina, Floyd Smith, Gábor Szabó, Gene Roland, Gösta Törner, Jimmy Jones, Joseph Reinhardt, Karel Krautgartner, King Pleasure, Kirk Stuart, Kurt Edelhagen, Leonid Utyosov, Matthew Stevens, Monk Montgomery, Murray McEachern, Radka Toneff, Ray Draper, Sonny Greer, Sonny Stitt, Thelonious Monk, Tommy Bryant, Vido Musso, and Wingy Manone; births of Ambrose Akinmusire, Andreas Lønmo Knudsrød, Daniel Herskedal, Daniel Zamir, Émile Parisien, Eric Darius, Erica von Kleist, Even Helte Hermansen, Ferit Odman, Hedvig Mollestad Thomassen, Irene Kepl, Michel Reis, Isak Strand, Jessy J, Jonathan Fritzén, Malene Mortensen, Marco Di Meco, Mariam Wallentin, Martin Musaubach, Nellie McKay, Øyvind Skarbø, Stephan Meidell, Veronika Harcsa, and YolanDa Brown.
- 1981 in jazz, death of Anders Hana, Bill Coleman, Bob Bates, Cat Anderson, Cozy Cole, Fernand Coppieters, Floyd "Candy" Johnson, Frank Socolow, Frank Weir, Georg Malmstén, Georges Henry, Gene Russell, Hazel Scott, Helen Humes, Hoagy Carmichael, Ike Isaacs, Jean Robert, Joe Carroll, Johnny Windhurst, Maciej Obara, Mary Lou Williams, Oscar Moore, Polo Barnes, Red Saunders, Russell Procope, Sam Jones, Seymour Österwall, Shep Fields, Snub Mosley, Sonny Red, Taft Jordan, Tommy Turk, and Victor Assis Brasil; births of Alexander Hawkins, Anders Thorén, Andy Davies, Carmen Souza, Chris Thile, Dan Forshaw, Elina Duni, Erik Nylander, Erlend Slettevoll, Fredrik Mikkelsen, Gwilym Simcock, Gwyneth Herbert, Hilde Marie Kjersem, Ivar Loe Bjørnstad, Ivo Neame, Jørgen Munkeby, Kamasi Washington, Kaori Kobayashi, Kim Myhr, Lars Horntveth, Maciej Obara, Maria Ylipää, Martin Taxt, Ola Kvernberg, Olavi Louhivuori, Paloma Faith, Sam Amidon, Sarah Buechi, Sigurd Hole, and Thomas Morgan.
- 1980 in jazz, death of Aldo Rossi, Amos White, Babs Gonzales, Barney Bigard, Bill Evans, Bobby Jones, Charles Fowlkes, Chauncey Morehouse, Chino Pozo, Dick Stabile, Dominic Lash, Don Albert, Don Banks, Duke Pearson, Ed Garland, Eric Vogel, Freddie Roach, Harlan Lattimore, Herman Autrey, Irmgard Österwall, Jan Werich, Jane Froman, Jimmy Bryant, Jimmy Crawford, Jimmy Durante, Jimmy Forrest, Lennie Felix, Monk Hazel, Norman Keenan, Oscar Alemán, Paul Howard, Peck Kelley, Pekka Pöyry, Poley McClintock, Ronnie Boykins, Shorty Sherock, Sonny Burke, Stu Martin, and Vinicius de Moraes; births of Alberto Porro Carmona, Andreas Amundsen, Anton Eger, Benedikt Jahnel, Brandi Disterheft, Christina Bjordal, Christoffer Andersen, Colin Vallon, David Arthur Skinner, Dominic Lash, Elana Stone, Federico Casagrande, Gustav Lundgren, Hannah Marshall, Harold Lopez Nussa, Ibrahim Maalouf, Jasser Haj Youssef, Jimmy Rosenberg, Julie Crochetière, Keith Christie, Kendrick Scott, Lars Horntveth, Lena Nymark, Lizz Wright, Manuel Valera, Mark Guiliana, Martin Blanes, Mary Halvorson, Morten Schantz, Øystein Moen, Paddy Milner, Pål Hausken, Ruslan Sirota, Sasha Dobson, Simin Tander, Stian Omenås, Takuya Kuroda, Tim Giles, Tyshawn Sorey, Vincent Peirani, and Yasek Manzano Silva.

== 1970s ==
- 1979 in jazz, deaths of Blue Mitchell, Charles Kynard, Charles Mingus, Corky Corcoran, David Izenzon, Demetrio Stratos, Eddie Jefferson, Grant Green, Henry Coker, John Simmons, Lou Busch, Luděk Hulan, Matthew Gee, Ray Ventura, Sabu Martinez, Sonny Payne, Stan Kenton, Teddy Smith, Vagif Mustafazadeh, Wilbur Ware, and Zbigniew Seifert; births of Alf Wilhelm Lundberg, Anat Cohen, Audun Ellingsen, Benedikte Shetelig Kruse, Bjørn Vidar Solli, Corey Wilkes, Derek Paravicini, Edith WeUtonga, Espen Reinertsen, Heidi Skjerve, Hermund Nygård, Hiromi Uehara, Ilmari Pohjola, Jamie Cullum, Jon Fält, Kathleen Edwards, Kenneth Kapstad, Kristor Brødsgaard, Kudzai Sevenzo, Leo Genovese, Mathias Eick, Norah Jones, Ole Morten Vågan, Ove Alexander Billington, Pascal Schumacher, Stein Urheim, Stian Westerhus, Susanna Wallumrød, Tora Augestad, and Tuomo Prättälä.
- 1978 in jazz, deaths of Alix Combelle, Arne Hülphers, Beryl Booker, Bill Jennings, Bud Brisbois, Don Ellis, Frances Wayne, Frank Rosolino, Gregory Herbert, Happy Caldwell, Irene Kral, Jimmy Nottingham, Joe Marsala, Joe Venuti, Kaoru Abe, Larry Young, Lennie Hastings, Lennie Tristano, Louis Cottrell Jr., Louis Prima, Marlowe Morris, Money Johnson, Ray Noble, Richard Plunket Greene, Teddy Bunn, Teddy Hill, and Terry Kath; births of Andreas Öberg, Andrew McCormack, Ane Carmen Roggen, Antal Pusztai, Børge-Are Halvorsen, Cem Tuncer, China Moses, Chris Jennings, Clarice Assad, Daniel Heløy Davidsen, Esben Selvig, Eva Kruse, Even Ormestad, Ida Roggen, Jakob Bro, Janek Gwizdala, Jonas Howden Sjøvaag, Jonas Kullhammar, Jukka Eskola, Julie Dahle Aagård, Kekko Fornarelli, Lage Lund, Luca Gianquitto, Marc Demuth, Marita Røstad, Masayuki Hiizumi, Matt Dusk, Michael Wollny, Mike Moreno, Mikkel Ploug, Morten Qvenild, Niels Klein, Nils Janson, Robert Glasper, Robi Botos, Rozina Pátkai, Sean Jones, Soweto Kinch, Steinar Nickelsen, Susana Santos Silva, Søren Kjærgaard, Susanne Alt, Susy Kane, Tineke Postma, Valtteri Laurell Pöyhönen, and Videlina Mircheva.
- 1977 in jazz, deaths of Art Mardigan, Bennie Green, Benny Moten, Buddy Johnson, Erroll Garner, George Barnes, Hampton Hawes, J. C. Moses, Joe Garland, Julian Gould, Julius Watkins, Maysa Matarazzo, Milt Buckner, Milt Raskin, Moon Mullens, Paloma Efron, Paul Desmond, Rahsaan Roland Kirk, Richie Kamuca, Sam Brown, Sonny Criss, and Teddi King; births of Andrea Veneziani, Andreas Haddeland, Anine Kruse, Asbjørn Lerheim, Atle Nymo, Brynjar Rasmussen, Dan Cray, David Wallumrød, Elliot Mason, Evelina De Lain, Even Kruse Skatrud, Farnell Newton, Florian Weber, Frøy Aagre, Giuliano Modarelli, Håkon Kornstad, Håvard Stubø, Ida Sand, Jane Monheit, Jason Marsalis, Jasper Høiby, Jef Neve, Julius Lind, Kirsti Huke, Mads Berven, Martin Horntveth, Matthew Bourne, Nicolai Munch-Hansen, Ole Jørn Myklebust, Quincy Davis, Ozan Musluoğlu, Per Zanussi, Rhian Benson, Sevda Alekbarzadeh, Shahin Novrasli, Sissel Vera Pettersen, Tomeka Reid, Tor Egil Kreken, Tore Johansen, Torstein Lofthus, Torun Eriksen, and Verneri Pohjola.
- 1976 in jazz, deaths of August Agbola O'Browne, Bobby Hackett, Buddy Featherstonhaugh, Connee Boswell, Fleetwood Mac, Freddie King, Gösta Theselius, Herb Flemming, Jim McCartney, Jimmy Garrison, Juan d'Arienzo, Junior Collins, Keith Relf, Lars Gullin, Mike Pratt, Paul Kossoff, Ray Nance, Rube Bloom, Rudy Pompilli, Skip Martin, Ted Buckner, Tommy Bolin, Victoria Spivey, Vince Guaraldi, and Willie Maiden; births of Alex Pangman, Andreas Mjøs, Andreas Schaerer, Ane Brun, Ben Wendel, Emilie-Claire Barlow, Eric Harland, Erja Lyytinen, Erlend Jentoft, Femi Temowo, Ferenc Nemeth, Freddy Wike, Gretchen Parlato, Harmen Fraanje, Hilde Louise Asbjørnsen, Ivar Grydeland, Jan Werner Danielsen, Jarle Bernhoft, Jonas Westergaard, Jostein Gulbrandsen, Julia Biel, Karl Strømme, Kresten Osgood, Kinan Azmeh, Kjetil Møster, Kjetil Steensnæs, Miguel Zenón, Ole Børud, Orlando le Fleming, Pekka Kuusisto, Roger Arntzen, Tamar Halperin, Tia Fuller, Torbjörn Zetterberg, and Yasuyuki "Yaz" Takagi.
- 1975 in jazz, deaths of Åke Persson, Artemi Ayvazyan, Benny Harris, Cannonball Adderley, Cornel Chiriac, Earl Washington, Fess Williams, Josephine Baker, Lee Wiley, Mongezi Feza, Oliver Nelson, Pete Clarke, Pippo Starnazza, René Thomas, Sandy Brown, Stan Wrightsman, T-Bone Walker, Theodore Carpenter, Trevor Koehler, and Zutty Singleton; births of Arne Jansen, Aslak Hartberg, Céline Bonacina, Chris Gall, David Braid, Erik Johannessen, Espen Aalberg, Fabrizio Sotti, Frode Haltli, Frode Nymo, Géraldine Laurent, Gianluca Petrella, Gisle Torvik, Gunhild Carling, Håkon Mjåset Johansen, Håvard Wiik, Helge Lien, Jacob Anderskov, Jairzinho Oliveira, Jan Harbeck, Jannike Kruse, Jason Moran, Jozef Dumoulin, Kåre Opheim, Katja Toivola, Kellylee Evans, Lars Andreas Haug, Lionel Friedli, Marcin Wasilewski, Matana Roberts, Mats Eilertsen, Michael Magalon, Niki King, Ole Marius Sandberg, Orrin Evans, Øyvind Storesund, Paul Harrison, Rolf-Erik Nystrøm, Sondre Meisfjord, Søren Bebe, Squarepusher, Steinar Raknes, and Taylor Ho Bynum.
- 1974 in jazz, deaths of Archie Semple, Bill Chase, Bobby Timmons, Don Fagerquist, Duke Ellington, Ed Allen, Eddie Safranski, Floyd Bean, Fud Candrix, Gene Ammons, George Brunies, Geraldo, Gus Deloof, Gus Viseur, Harry Carney, Joe Benjamin, John Anderson, Julian Dash, Marvin Ash, Paul Gonsalves, Sam Donahue, and Tina Brooks; births of Aaron Goldberg, Alexi Tuomarila, Anders Aarum, Beate S. Lech, Benjamin Koppel, Bernt Moen, Biel Ballester, Børre Dalhaug, Chihiro Yamanaka, Coleman Mellett, Dafnis Prieto, Frode Kjekstad, Hild Sofie Tafjord, Jonathan Bratoeff, Kai Fagaschinski, Kåre Nymark, Kenneth Ekornes, Knut Aalefjær, Lars Skoglund, Lasse Marhaug, Laura Macdonald, Line Horntveth, Madeleine Peyroux, Magnus Lindgren, Martin Tingvall, Miriam Aïda, Nick Etwell, Niño Josele, Paal Nilssen-Love, Simon Spillett, Sjur Miljeteig, Sophie Alour, Stefan Pasborg, Thomas Toivonen, Varre Vartiainen, Victor Kunonga, and Viktoria Tolstoy.
- 1973 in jazz, deaths of Andy Razaf, Ben Webster, Bernard Etté, Bill Harris, Bobby Darin, Brew Moore, Clarence Shaw, Eddie Condon, Emile Christian, Gene Krupa, Jack Marshall, Jackie Dougan, Joe Harriott, Kid Ory, Leon Washington, Nick Stabulas, Sid Phillips, Spanky DeBrest, Tubby Hayes, and Willie "The Lion" Smith; births of Bartlomiej Oles, Ben Castle, Brian Culbertson, Christian Jaksjø, Clare Teal, Dorota Miśkiewicz, Ebru Aydın, Eirik Hegdal, Eivind Austad, Eivind Opsvik, Ethan Iverson, Frédéric Yonnet, Fredrik Wallumrød, Gunhild Seim, Gustavo Assis-Brasil, Hallgeir Pedersen, Janne Mark, John Blackwell, Kalle Kalima, Kate Dimbleby, Magne Thormodsæter, Marcin Oles, Maria Markesini, Marius Reksjø, Meg Okura, Moses Taiwa Molelekwa, Nelson Williams, Nicholas Payton, Nikki Yeoh, Norihiko Hibino, Petr Kroutil, Scott Hammond, Stefon Harris, Susheela Raman, Teodross Avery, Thomas T. Dahl, Timuçin Şahin, Titilayo Adedokun, Torbjørn Sletta Jacobsen, and Wetle Holte.
- 1972 in jazz, deaths of André Ekyan, Bill Johnson, Cal Massey, Clancy Hayes, Dalva de Oliveira, Don Byas, Dud Bascomb, Ferde Grofé, Hall Overton, Hayes Alvis, Hideo Shiraki, Jimmy Rushing, Kenny Dorham, Lee Morgan, Lovie Austin, Mahalia Jackson, Marty Flax, Mezz Mezzrow, Mike Bryan, Phil Seamen, Sharkey Bonano, and Reverend Gary Davis; births of Alex Machacek, Anders Christensen, Ari Poutiainen, Christer Fredriksen, Christian McBride, Christos Rafalides, Daniela Schaechter, Eugene Ball, Federico Ughi, Gerard Presencer, John Daversa, Katrine Madsen, Ketil Gutvik, Lindha Kallerdahl, Lisa Werlinder, Meriç Yurdatapan, Mimi Jones, Morten Lund, Neil Cowley, Nino Katamadze, Noriko Ueda, Oscar Peñas, Øyvind Nypan, Pasquale Stafano, Roger Johansen, Siri Gjære, Stefano Bollani, and Thomas Strønen.
- 1971 in jazz, deaths of Baby Face Willette, Bert Ambrose, Bobby Donaldson, Charlie Shavers, Chas Remue, Derek Humble, Ernie Caceres, Gary McFarland, Gregor, Harold McNair, Harry Arnold, Harry Roy, Harry Shields, Irene Daye, King Curtis, Lil Hardin Armstrong, Lou McGarity, Louis Armstrong, Morey Feld, Sonny White, Tab Smith, and Wynton Kelly; births of Antonio Sánchez, Carla Kihlstedt, Chris Potter, Christian Wallumrød, Dominique Atkins, Ed Motta, Erland Dahlen, Erykah Badu, Frode Berg, Gerald Preinfalk, Graham Wood, Gregory Porter, Håvard Fossum, Helén Eriksen, Ingar Zach, Ingebrigt Håker Flaten, Jamie Saft, Jesse Green, Joey Defrancesco, Kasper Tranberg, Kenya Hathaway, Kristin Asbjørnsen, Leszek Możdżer, Liberty Ellman, Lisa Ekdahl, Mattias Ståhl, Max Beesley, Mika Pohjola, Mina Agossi, Nasheet Waits, Nigel Hitchcock, Noriko Matsueda, Øyvind Brandtsegg, Robert Mitchell, Russell Gunn, Sean J. Kennedy, Shoji Meguro, Solveig Slettahjell, Stian Carstensen, Till Brönner, Tom Norris, Trygve Seim, Vellu Halkosalmi, Vijay Iyer, Walter Blanding, and Zoe Rahman.
- 1970 in jazz, deaths of Albert Ayler, Barney Rapp, Billy Stewart, Booker Ervin, Cliff Jackson, Don Stovall, Elmer Schoebel, Emile Barnes, Fernando Arbello, Frankie Lee Sims, Jack Sels, Johnny Hodges, Lem Davis, Lonnie Johnson, Maxwell Davis, Otto Hardwick, Perry Bradford, Phil Spitalny, Ralph Escudero, and Scoops Carry; births of Adam Cruz, Adam Pierończyk, Alvester Garnett, Andreas Paolo Perger, Anna Maria Jopek, Anna Mjöll, Avishai Cohen, Bernardo Sassetti, Brad Mehldau, Brian Blade, Chris Fryar, Chris Tarry, Craig Taborn, Dave Maric, Dominic Green, Dwayne Burno, Eldbjørg Raknes, Éric Legnini, Eric Reed, Erik van der Luijt, Frank McComb, Geoffrey Keezer, Giovanni Mirabassi, Glenn Corneille, Gregory Hutchinson, Harald Johnsen, Håvard Lund, Haydain Neale, Heine Totland, Iiro Rantala, Ingrid Laubrock, Jacob Karlzon, Jacob Young, Jeremy Davenport, Jesper Bodilsen, Jesse Harris, Jimmy Bennington, Juliet Kelly, Justin Hayford, Karen Souza, Kate McGarry, Keith Anderson, Kishon Khan, Kjersti Stubø, Kurt Rosenwinkel, Lina Nyberg, Live Maria Roggen, Lullaby Baxter, Manuel Mota, Marco Minnemann, Maria Kannegaard, Marlon Jordan, Matt Garrison, Matt Lavelle, Michael Schiefel, Médéric Collignon, Michel Bisceglia, Neil Yates, Norman Brown, Peter Martin, Roger Cicero, Ron Westray, Simone Eriksrud, Susanne Abbuehl, Susie Ibarra, Tobias Sjögren, Toby Smith, Tom Brantley, Tone Lise Moberg, Tord Gustavsen, and Yinka Davies.

== 1960s ==
- 1969 in jazz, deaths of Albert Stinson, Alcide Pavageau, Billy Cotton, Bobby Henderson, Booker Pittman, Cedric Haywood, Coleman Hawkins, Ernie Farrow, Jiří Šlitr, Johnny Bayersdorffer, Krzysztof Komeda, Leo Mathisen, Manuel Manetta, Nate Kazebier, Paul Barbarin, Paul Chambers, Pee Wee Russell, Pops Foster, Roberto Firpo, Russ Morgan, Slick Jones, Ted Heath, Tony Fruscella, Tony Pastor, Tony Sbarbaro, Wilbur Harden, Bill McKinney, and Wynonie Harris; births of Adrian Fry, Alon Yavnai, Asaf Sirkis, Assif Tsahar, Ayako Shirasaki, Aziza Mustafa Zadeh, Candy Dulfer, Carl Craig, Carolyn Breuer, Catherine Delaunay, Chris Minh Doky, Cuong Vu, Daniel Tinte, Denys Baptiste, Duane Eubanks, Dylan Howe, Edward Simon, Erlend Skomsvoll, Ernie Hammes, Francesco Buzzurro, Fredrik Ljungkvist, Giovanni Allevi, Guillermo Klein, Gulleiv Wee, James Carter, Jason Rebello, Joshua Redman, Joyce Cooling, Kate Higgins, Kate Michaels, Kim Ofstad, Lelo Nika, Lucian Ban, Marcin Jahr, Marek Napiórkowski, Mat Maneri, Mathilde Grooss Viddal, Michael Lington, Michel Delville, Mindi Abair, Na Yoon-sun, Olga Konkova, Ori Kaplan, Øyvind Brække, Per Mathisen, Peter Asplund, Rebecca Martin, Régis Huby, Roy Hargrove, Roy Paci, Scott Amendola, Ståle Storløkken, Stefano di Battista, Stéphane Galland, Stephen Scott, Svein Olav Herstad, Thomas Fryland, Thomas Winther Andersen, Travis Shook, and Trude Eick.
- 1968 in jazz, deaths of Bill Stegmeyer, Börje Fredriksson, Earl Swope, Eyvin Andersen, Jack Bland, Jan Johansson, Jay Wilbur, Luckey Roberts, Monk Hazel, Reinhold Svensson, Robin Douglas-Home, and Wes Montgomery; births of Alan Licht, Antonio Hart, Anthony Wilson, Arve Henriksen, D'arcy Wretzky, David Gald, David Sánchez, Eric Alexander, Finn Guttormsen, Frank Kvinge, Frode Barth, Jakob Dinesen, Jean David Blanc, John Hollenbeck, Jørn Øien, Jukka Perko, Julia Hülsmann, Ken Ford, Kyle Eastwood, Lalah Hathaway, Larry Goldings, Noël Akchoté, Per Oddvar Johansen, Rodney Whitaker, Rune Brøndbo, Sherman Irby, Stochelo Rosenberg, Sylvie Courvoisier, Tim Lefebvre, Vahagn Hayrapetyan, and Vincent Courtois.
- 1967 in jazz, deaths of Amanda Randolph, Billy Banks, Billy Strayhorn, Boots Mussulli, Buster Bailey, Carl-Henrik Norin, Edmond Hall, Elmo Hope, Fats Pichon, Herman Chittison, Ida Cox, Jimmy Archey, John Coltrane, Keg Johnson, Muggsy Spanier, Paul Whiteman, Pete Johnson, Randy Brooks, Red Allen, Rex Stewart, Rob Swope, Simon Brehm, Stuff Smith, and Willie Smith; births of Alex Harding, Anne Wolf, Audun Erlien, Audun Skorgen, Børge Petersen-Øverleir, Carsten Dahl, Charnett Moffett, Claire Martin, D. D. Jackson, Dhafer Youssef, Duncan Hopkins, Gerald Gradwohl, Håkon Storm-Mathisen, Hans Mathisen, Harry Connick Jr., Hilaria Kramer, Ivar Kolve, Jacob Fischer, Jeanfrançois Prins, Jim Black, Junko Onishi, Kurt Elling, Lars Gulliksson, Marc Cary, Maria Răducanu, Mark Nightingale, Martha D Lewis, Nikolaj Hess, Peter Bernstein, Petter Wettre, Rami Eskelinen, Sascha Ley, Steffen Schorn, Stein Inge Brækhus, Steve Davis, Svein Folkvord, Tom Bancroft, Tommy Smith, and Vassilis Tsabropoulos.
- 1966 in jazz, deaths of Billy Kyle, Boyd Raeburn, Bud Powell, Colette Bonheur, Darnell Howard, Dave Lambert, Isaiah Morgan, Johnny St. Cyr, Kid Howard, Lee Blair, Lucky Millinder, Nikele Moyake, Osie Johnson, Rolf Billberg, Shorty Baker, Smiley Lewis, Sylvia Telles, Thelma Terry, and Wellman Braud; births of Ann Farholt, Anthony Joseph, Bill Charlap, Bill Stewart, Biréli Lagrène, Carl Ludwig Hübsch, Donny McCaslin, Greg Gisbert, Harry Allen, Henrik Andersen, Hilmar Jensson, Ingrid Jensen, Jacky Terrasson, Jan Lundgren, Jarle Vespestad, Jeff Healey, John Gunther, John Rae, Julian Argüelles, Julian Joseph, Julian Siegel, Karen Mantler, Kristin Sevaldsen, Larry Grenadier, Lars Møller, Luciana Souza, Majken Christiansen, Makiko Hirabayashi, Margareta Bengtson, Mark Whitfield, Michael Cain, Michael Mondesir, Nathalie Loriers, Nils Davidsen, Nils-Olav Johansen, Nina Shatskaya, Øystein B. Blix, Raul Midón, Regina Carter, Ricardo Garcia, Rigmor Gustafsson, Roberto Tola, Sheryl Bailey, Silje Nergaard, Siri Gellein, Theo Bleckmann, Tony Kofi, Torstein Ellingsen, Toshimaru Nakamura, Wellman Braud, and Wessell Anderson.
- 1965 in jazz, deaths of Bonnie Wetzel, Buster Harding, Cecil Brower, Charlie Burse, Clarence Williams, Claude Thornhill, Danilo Perez, Dave Barbour, Denzil Best, Earl Bostic, Edythe Wright, Evelyn Glennie, Eyran Katsenelenbogen, Freddie Slack, Gerorge Tucker, Hank D'Amico, Jack Hylton, Joe Sanders, Joey Calderazzo, Keg Purnell, Lou Black, Nat King Cole, Peter Packay, Spencer Williams, Spike Jones, Steve Brown, Tadd Dameron, Valdemar Eiberg, Warren Tartaglia, and Willie Dennis; births of Antonio Faraò, Arturo Tappin, Björk, Björn Meyer, Curtis Stigers, Darko Jurković, David Linx, Delfeayo Marsalis, Derrick Gardner, Geir Lysne, Hans Ulrik, Helge Andreas Norbakken, Helge Sunde, Hildegunn Øiseth, Javon Jackson, Jesse Davis, Joakim Milder, Karin Mensah, Kostas Theodorou, Liv Stoveland, Magnus Broo, Magnus Öström, Mark d'Inverno, Mark Turner, Miki Higashino, Mirko Fait, Njål Ølnes, Odd André Elveland, Ole Mathisen, Omar Sosa, Patrick Scales, Philip Harper, Rain Sultanov, Ravi Coltrane, Ron Affif, Sheila Majid, Sylvain Luc, Terri Lyne Carrington, Tone Åse, Wolfgang Haffner, and Wolfgang Muthspiel.
- 1964 in jazz, deaths of Artie Bernstein, Big Boy Goudie, Buddy Cole, Cecil Scott, Cole Porter, Conrad Gozzo, Dave Bowman, Don Redman, Eric Dolphy, Francisco Canaro, Håkan von Eichwald, Jack Teagarden, Joe Maini, Nick Travis, Sam Cooke, Vi Burnside, and Willie Bryant; births of Andy Panayi, Antti Sarpila, Arve Furset, Barbara Dennerlein, Benita Haastrup, Brent Fischer, Bugge Wesseltoft, Carl Petter Opsahl, Cæcilie Norby, Courtney Pine, Dave O'Higgins, Dennis Rollins, Diana Krall, Esbjörn Svensson, Fabrizio Cassol, Harald Devold, Helge Lilletvedt, Iain Ballamy, Jimmy Chamberlin, Johannes Eick, Kåre Kolve, Liane Carroll, Mark Mondesir, Martin France, Mats Gustafsson, Neneh Cherry, Peter Washington, Phillip Bent, Philippe Aerts, Ramón Valle, Rebecka Törnqvist, Reidar Skår, Robert Hurst, Scotty Barnhart, Steve Williamson, Terje Isungset, Tetuzi Akiyama, Tobias Delius, Tracy Chapman, Trond Sverre Hansen, Victor Wooten, Vincent Herring, Wayman Tisdale, Werner Neumann, and Yutaka Shiina.
- 1963 in jazz, deaths of Addison Farmer, Arvid Gram Paulsen, Bob Scobey, Bobby Jaspar, Castor McCord, Curtis Counce, Dinah Washington, Gene Sedric, Glen Gray, Herbie Nichols, Ike Quebec, Irving Aaronson, Jimmy Reynolds, Joe Gordon, John Adriano Acea, Lizzie Miles, Lodewijk Parisius, Naftule Brandwein, Pete Brown, Roy Palmer, Sam Allen, Skinnay Ennis, Sonny Clark, Specs Wright, and Wade Legge; births of Anders Widmark, Antoine Roney, Baard Slagsvold, Benny Green, Bill Lowrey, Bill Wells, Christine Ott, Christine Tobin, Cyrus Chestnut, Dan Berglund, Dalia Faitelson, Dave Douglas, Dave McKean, Don Braden, Don Paterson, Eric Person, Eric Vloeimans, Eva Cassidy, Fredrik Lundin, Gerald Cleaver, Gianni Lenoci, Gilad Atzmon, Gonzalo Rubalcaba, Holly Cole, Horacio "El Negro" Hernandez, Jacqui Dankworth, Jeff Beal, Jens Johansson, Jon Ballantyne, Karen Briggs, Marc Antoine, Marcus Roberts, Martin Pizzarelli, Nelson Faria, Niels Lan Doky, Nigel Mooney, Nikki Iles, Peter Havlicek, Ole Amund Gjersvik, Ralph Alessi, Renato Borghetti, Ron Miles, Russ Lorenson, Russell Malone, Scott Colley, Sherrie Maricle, Stephanie Biddle, Steve Argüelles, Thomas Blachman, Thulla Christina Wamberg, Tierney Sutton, Tine Asmundsen, Vigleik Storaas, Ximo Tebar, Yoko Kanno, and Yoron Israel.
- 1962 in jazz, deaths of Donald Lambert, Doug Watkins, Eddie South, Harry Barris, Israel Crosby, Jean Goldkette, John Graas, Leo Parker, and Roger Wolfe Kahn; births of Andrej Šeban, Angelo Debarre, Arthur Maia, Aydin Esen, Bendik Hofseth, Billy Kilson, Brian Kellock, Caroline Henderson, Cecilia Coleman, Chris Botti, Christina von Bülow, Craig Handy, Cynthia Sayer, Dado Moroni, Darrell Grant, Dennis Mackrel, Eddie Benitez, Eddie Costa, Edsel Gomez, Fred Lonberg-Holm, Glauco Venier, Huw Warren, Ian Shaw, James Morrison, Jimmy Herring, Joanna Connor, Jon Klette, Jude Abbott, Julia Fordham, Juliet Roberts, Kenn Smith, Karoline Höfler, Lee Aaron, Lisa Ono, Mia Žnidarič, Michel Petrucciani, Mike Jones, Mike Walker, Nils Einar Vinjor, Olaf Kamfjord, Paul Tobey, Rachel Z, Ralph Peterson Jr., Renee Rosnes, Rob Bargad, Robert Balzar, Ronny Jordan, Snorre Bjerck, Tapani Rinne, Terence Blanchard, Thomas Agergaard, Tim Armacost, Tor Haugerud, Ugonna Okegwo, and Winard Harper.
- 1961 in jazz, deaths of Alphonse Picou, Booker Little, Cuba Austin, Freddy Johnson, George Formby, Miff Mole, Nick LaRocca, Noah Lewis, Scott LaFaro, Stick McGhee, and Wilber Sweatman; births of Alan Steward, Alison Moyet, Anders Bergcrantz, Anita Wardell, Art Porter Jr., Audun Kleive, Bo Sundström, Bobby Broom, Boney James, Candye Kane, Carl Allen, Clark Tracey, David Kikoski, Eivind Aarset, El DeBarge, Enya, Everette Harp, Eyþór Gunnarsson, Flavio Boltro, Franck Amsallem, Gary Thomas, Gene Calderazzo, Harald Dahlstrøm, Igor Butman, Ivan Božičević, Ivo Perelman, Jarmo Savolainen, Joe Ascione, Kai Eckhardt, Karl Seglem, Keiko Matsui, Ken Stubbs, Kenneth Sivertsen, Knut Reiersrud, Kofi Burbridge, Koji Kondo, Lê Quan Ninh, Leon Bosch, LeRoi Moore, Makoto Ozone, Marcelo Peralta, Mark Lockheart, Marvin Smith, Michael Publig, Miguel "Angá" Díaz, Mike Nielsen, Mohammed Nazam, Mornington Lockett, Paolo Fresu, Paul Hanmer, Paul Wagnberg, Rachelle Ferrell, Ralph Bowen, Russel Blake, Steve Wilson, Tak Matsumoto, Tina May, Wynton Marsalis, and Xavier Desandre Navarre.
- 1960 in jazz, death of Arv Garrison, Beverly Kenney, Bill Johnson, Isidore Barbarin, Jimmy Bertrand, June Cole, Lawrence Duhé, Lee Collins, Mátyás Seiber, Oscar Pettiford, and Zilas Görling; births of Adrián Iaies, Alan Thomson, Alec Dankworth, Andy Quin, Angélique Kidjo, Arturo O'Farrill, Banjo Mosele, Branford Marsalis, Brian Bromberg, Carmen Bradford, Chad Wackerman, Chano Domínguez, Chris Standring, Craig Bailey, Daniele Sepe, Daryl Hayott, Dave Weckl, David Piltch, Django Bates, Dominic Miller, Donald Harrison, Edgar Meyer, Eldad Tarmu, Eliane Elias, Erik Truffaz, Femi Kuti, Fred Thelonious Baker, Friðrik Karlsson, Fritz Renold, Gary Husband, Graham Haynes, Greg Osby, Henrik Bolberg Pedersen, Jean-Paul Bourelly, Jean Toussaint, Jeff "Tain" Watts, Jens Winther, Jeremy Monteiro, Jim Beard, John Altenburgh, John Beasley, John Pizzarelli, Ken Schaphorst, Kenny Garrett, Khaled, Laurent de Wilde, Lee Tomboulian, Leila Pinheiro, Lekan Babalola, Lena Willemark, Lennart Ginman, Liu Yuan, Lloyd Swanton, Lonnie Plaxico, Maria Pia De Vito, María Rivas, Maria Schneider, Mário Laginha, Mark Ledford, Marla Glen, Mats Rondin, Matthew Shipp, Michel Massot, Mike Fahn, Muriel Anderson, Nelson Rangell, Nils Petter Molvær, Ole Jacob Hystad, Orphy Robinson, Paul Taylor, Peter Apfelbaum, Pharez Whitted, Povl Erik Carstensen, Richard Elliot, Rodney Kendrick, Rolf Graf, Sebi Tramontana, Sergio Cammariere, Steve Waterman, Stig Hvalryg, Ted Nash, Terje Gewelt, Tino di Geraldo, Tom Kennedy, Tore Brunborg, Umberto Petrin, Valarie Pettiford, Victor Bailey, Wallace Roney, Wilhelm Schröter, and Zachary Breaux.

== 1950s ==
- 1959 in jazz, deaths of Alphonse Trent, Avery Parrish, Baby Dodds, Billie Holiday, Boyce Brown, Boris Vian, Charlie Johnson, Ed Cuffee, Hal McIntyre, Lawrence Marrero, Lester Young, Minor Hall, Omer Simeon, Shadow Wilson, Sidney Bechet, and Sidney Desvigne; births of Akira Jimbo, Alan Barnes, Albert Beger, Anjani, Antoine Hervé, Antonio Ciacca, Bill Ware, Billy Drummond, Bjørn Jenssen, Brian Setzer, Burhan Öçal, Cindy Blackman Santana, Clayton Cameron, Cleveland Watkiss, Conrad Herwig, Corinne Drewery, Dale Barlow, Del Rey, Dennis Chambers, Dominique Di Piazza, Drew Gress, Eddie Parker, Elin Rosseland, Ellery Eskelin, Erik Vermeulen, Ernesto Rodrigues, François Bourassa, Frank Lacy, Frode Fjellheim, Gaute Storaas, Graham Clark, Gregg Bissonette, Jeff Harnar, Jimmy Bosch, Joanna MacGregor, Joe Locke, John Lindberg, John Parricelli, John Patitucci, Kåre Thomsen, Ken Peplowski, Kevyn Lettau, Kris Defoort, Marcus Miller, Mary Ann Redmond, Michael Philip Mossman, Nguyên Lê, Nils Jansen, Nils Mathisen, Odd Magne Gridseth, Ole Hamre, Omar Hakim, Otomo Yoshihide, Ottmar Liebert, Patrick Defossez, Per Hillestad, Phil Roy, Rebecca Jenkins, Rene Van Verseveld, Rita Marcotulli, Renato D'Aiello, Roberto Magris, Ronnie Burrage, Russ Gershon, Russel Walder, Sade Adu, Salman Gambarov, Scott Robinson, Sheldon Reynolds, Sigurd Køhn, Simon Nabatov, Staffan William-Olsson, Stanley Jordan, Sue Terry, Sweet Baby J'ai, Tahir Aydoğdu, Ted Rosenthal, Thilo Berg, Tony Monaco, Tony Reedus, Vicki Genfan, Virginia Mayhew, and Zim Ngqawana.
- 1958 in jazz, deaths of Carl Perkins, Danny Alvin, Doc Cook, Fulton McGrath, George E. Lee, Herbie Fields, Joe Morris, Lorraine Geller, Martha Boswell, Olivia Plunket Greene, Shifty Henry, Sterling Bose, Ted Donnelly, Tiny Bradshaw, Tom Brown, and W. C. Handy; births of Ana Caram, Andrew Lamb, Anita Baker, Anne-Marie Giørtz, Bajone, Bill Evans, Bjørn Klakegg, Bob Holz, Bruce Barth, Béla Fleck, Carlos del Junco, Carol Chaikin, Chieli Minucci, Claude Deppa, David Berkman, David Finck, David Hazeltine, David Newton, Deirdre Cartwright, Don Byron, Don Laka, Ellen Sandweiss, Erna Yuzbashyan, Frans Bak, Gabriel Fliflet, Gar Samuelson, George Koller, George Schuller, Gerald L. Cannon, Greg Boyer, Howard Alden, Jair-Rôhm Parker Wells, Jakko Jakszyk, Jan Gunnar Hoff, Jeanie Bryson, Jerry Zigmont, Jesse McGuire, Jim Campilongo, Jim Snidero, Joe DeRenzo, John Goldsby, Jonas Hellborg, Kenny Drew Jr., Kenny Washington, Kevin Mahogany, Kirk Whalum, Lakki Patey, Lannie Battistini, Lars Danielsson, Leon Lee Dorsey, Leroy Jones, Lewis Nash, Michael Formanek, Michael Weiss, Nancy Zeltsman, Olav Dale, Paul Grabowsky, Prince Rogers Nelson, Roberto Gatto, Rodney Franklin, Ronaldo Folegatti, Ronan Guilfoyle, Satoko Fujii, Stevie Vallance, Tom Schuman, Tomas Franck, Tony Lakatos, Ulf Wakenius, and Wolfgang Mitterer.
- 1957 in jazz, deaths of Abe Lyman, Carroll Dickerson, Cripple Clarence Lofton, Curtis Mosby, Dean Benedetti, Erik Tuxen, Ernie Henry, Fud Livingston, George Girard, He Dasha, Jack Gardner, Jimmy Dorsey, Joe Shulman, Louis Mitchell, Richard McPartland, Serge Chaloff, Sonny Parker, Walter Page, and Wooden Joe Nicholas; births of Aage Tanggaard, Adrian Utley, Anca Parghel, Anders Jormin, Andrés Boiarsky, Andy Sheppard, Annette A. Aguilar, Anouar Brahem, Arthur Rhames, Arto Tunçboyacıyan, Barbara Lahr, Bert Joris, Billy Childs, Bobby Sanabria, Bogdan Holownia, Carleen Anderson, Chris Poland, Clarence Seay, Clifton Anderson, Danilo Rea, Dave Stryker, Eddie Allen, Eerik Siikasaari, Emily Remler, Éric Le Lann, Eric Marienthal, Ernst-Wiggo Sandbakk, Faith Nolan, Ferenc Snétberger, Fred Ho, Fredrik Carl Størmer, Future Man, Gebhard Ullmann, George Landress, George Letellier, Gerald Albright, Geri Allen, Guy Barker, Hanna Banaszak, Harri Stojka, Hayes Greenfield, Herlin Riley, Ian Villafana, Inger Marie Gundersen, Issei Noro, James McBride, Jason Kao Hwang, Jennifer Batten, Jerry Weldon, Jimmy Earl, John Fedchock, John Kenny, Jose Valdes, Judy Carmichael, Kevin Eubanks, Luis Salinas, Lynn Seaton, Lynne Arriale, Maartin Allcock, Mamdouh Bahri, Manfred Hausleitner, Manu Katché, Martin Litton, Mike Smith, Mino Cinelu, Morten Halle, Myra Melford, Nestor Torres, Oddmund Finnseth, Pamela Fleming, Paul Hardcastle, Phillip Barham, Rabih Abou-Khalil, Ray Kennedy, Rick Lazaroff, Roberto Ottaviano, Roger Ingram, Runar Tafjord, Sibongile Khumalo, Simon Phillips, Sophia Domancich, Steve Berry, Tatsu Aoki, Ted Gioia, Tetsuo Sakurai, Thomas Chapin, Tom McClung, Tom McDermott, Tom Rainey, Tom Varner, Tommy Campbell, Vanessa Rubin, William Edward Childs, Wolter Wierbos, and Yngve Moe.
- 1956 in jazz, deaths of Achille Baquet, Adrian Rollini, Alex Hyde, Art Tatum, Clifford Brown, Don Kirkpatrick, Ernst Höllerhagen, Frankie Trumbauer, Fred Rich, Harry Parry, Joe Appleton, Richie Powell, Tommy Dorsey, Una Mae Carlisle, and Valaida Snow; births of Aaron Scott, Alex Cline, Anna Lyman, Ben Besiakov, Bill Cunliffe, Billy Jenkins, Bob Belden, Brian Lynch, Bruce Forman, Chris Murrell, Chris Wilson, Danilo Terenzi, David Chesky, Denardo Coleman, Denis Colin, Denise Jannah, Dianne Reeves, Didier Lockwood, Doug Raney, Eivin One Pedersen, Frank Kimbrough, Franklin Kiermyer, Gary Smulyan, Gast Waltzing, Geir Holmsen, Geir Langslet, Hein van de Geyn, Hilde Hefte, Iro Haarla, Jamaaladeen Tacuma, Jane Bunnett, Jean-Marc Jafet, Jens Wendelboe, John Jorgenson, Karl Denson, Károly Binder, Kenny G, Kermit Driscoll, Kevin Norton, Lee Pui Ming, Liz Story, Louis Mhlanga, Lorraine Desmarais, Lucien Barbarin, Maria João, Marit Sandvik, Martin Taylor, Mary Coughlan, Mathias Claus, Michael Hashim, Mike LeDonne, Mikhail Alperin, Mimi Fox, Mitchel Forman, Ned Rothenberg, Nels Cline, Nicola Stilo, Nils Landgren, Oskar Aichinger, Quanti Bomani, Ralph Carney, Ralph Moore, Randy Johnston, Raoul Björkenheim, Raymond Strid, Reiner Michalke, Riccardo Del Fra, Rob Waring, Satoshi Inoue, Steve Coleman, Steve Dobrogosz, Steve Williams, Svein Dag Hauge, T Lavitz, Tessa Souter, Tim Landers, Tiziano Tononi, Uri Caine, Wayne Krantz, Wolfgang Lackerschmid, Wolfgang Puschnig, Zeena Parkins, and Ziad Rahbani.
- 1955 in jazz, deaths of Bessie Brown, Bob Gordon, Charlie Parker, Cow Cow Davenport, Dave Peyton, Dick Twardzik, Eddie Pollack, Ernst van 't Hoff, Henry Busse, James P. Johnson, John Spikes, Junior Raglin, Porter Grainger, Reuben Reeves, Shotaro Moriyasu, and Wardell Gray; births of Adam Nussbaum, Adam Rudolph, Akiko Yano, Alain Caron, Andrzej Łukasik, Annemarie Roelofs, Annie Whitehead, Avery Sharpe, Ben Clatworthy, Bheki Mseleku, Bill Laswell, Billie Davies, Boon Gould, Brian Hughes, Cassandra Wilson, Chalmers Alford, Chris Burnett, Chris Cain, Chris Tyle, Chuck Loeb, Curtis Lundy, Dan Barrett, David Murray, Dean Brown, Dean Friedman, Ed Schuller, Eduardo Niebla, Enver Izmaylov, Enzo Avitabile, Enzo Pietropaoli, Eric Watson, Erica Lindsay, Fred Hersch, Gary Crosby, Geoff Stradling, Georgina Born, Gerald Veasley, Gerry Hemingway, Glenn Horiuchi, Grace Knight, Grażyna Auguścik, Hamid Drake, Helge Schneider, Hiram Bullock, Hugh Marsh, Ivan Smirnov, Jan Kåre Hystad, Jane Ira Bloom, Jane Siberry, Janet Seidel, Jaribu Shahid, Jay Anderson, Jean Derome, Jeff Golub, Jeff Hirshfield, Jerry Tachoir, Joe Morris, Joey Baron, John Campbell, Johnny Alegre, Jon Balke, Joshua Breakstone, Jukka Linkola, Kenny Kirkland, Kenny Klein, Kitty Margolis, Kyle Jones, Laura Fygi, Laurent Cugny, Lesley Garrett, Marilyn Mazur, Marina Sirtis, Mark Feldman, Mark Hewins, Mars Williams, Marty Ehrlich, Mick Jones, Mihály Dresch, Mike Porcaro, Morten Gunnar Larsen, Mulgrew Miller, Nat Reeves, Nathan East, Ole Henrik Giørtz, Oliver Weindling, Pål Thowsen, Patricia Barber, Paul Sullivan, Pheeroan akLaff, Phillip Johnston, Pino Daniele, Preston Reed, Rick Braun, Robin Eubanks, Rune Klakegg, Santi Debriano, Scott Fields, Shelly Berg, Simon Spang-Hanssen, Steve Byrd, Tommy Emmanuel, Topper Headon, Vitold Rek, Vladislav Sendecki, Wayne Horvitz, and Wolfgang Reisinger.
- 1954 in jazz, deaths of Alfred Burt, Brad Gowans, Dink Johnson, Garland Wilson, Hot Lips Page, Lee Morse, Lil Green, Papa Celestin, Rudy Williams, and William Frank Newton; births of Al Di Meola, Andy Narell, Angela Bofill, Anthony Cox, Barb Jungr, Basia, Bill Milkowski, Bodil Niska, Brian Rolland, Brian Torff, Bruce Hornsby, Bruno Råberg, Carles Benavent, Carmen Lundy, Catherine Whitney, Chuck Deardorf, Cindy Breakspeare, Craig Chaquico, David Bloom, Dennis González, Don Mumford, Donald Brown, Ed Cherry, Edvard Askeland, Enzo Nini, Eric Von Essen, Ernst Ulrich Deuker, Eugenio Toussaint, Frank Jakobsen, Gunnar Andreas Berg, Günter Müller, Haakon Graf, Hank Roberts, Harry Sokal, Henry Johnson, Ivar Thomassen, Jay Hoggard, Jeff Clayton, Jeff Johnson, Jesper Lundgaard, Joe Fonda, Johannes Bauer, John Bernard Riley, John Butcher, John Russell, John Wolf Brennan, Johnny O'Neal, Jon Jang, Jovino Santos-Neto, Judy Niemack, Kåre Garnes, Kip Hanrahan, Knut Værnes, Lorne Lofsky, Madeline Eastman, Marc Ribot, Michael Moore, Michael White, Michel Benita, Michel Camilo, Nick Webb, Nnenna Freelon, Noel Pointer, Ondrej Havelka, Orhan Demir, Øystein Norvoll, Paleka, Pam Bricker, Paolo Vinaccia, Pat Metheny, Patrice Rushen, Pete Allen, Peter Erskine, Peter White, Rick Vandivier, Ricky Ford, Scott Earl Holman, Scott Hamilton, Scott Henderson, Sergio Caputo, Simon James, Stephanie Nakasian, Steve Holt, Steve LaSpina, Steve Masakowski, Steve Nelson, Steve Rochinski, Steve Rodby, Steve Swell, Stu Goldberg, Svein Olav Blindheim, Tchavolo Schmitt, Theresa Hightower, Tim Berne, Tim Hagans, Tim Sparks, Tina Marsh, Tom Browne, Torbjørn Sunde, Vince Jones, Warren Benbow, Wayne Peet, Wendell Brunious, and Yuri Lemeshev.
- 1953 in jazz, deaths of Django Reinhardt, Jimmy "Jammin'" Smith, Julius Foss, Larry Shields, Mike Mosiello, Peter DeRose, and Tiny Kahn; births of Alan Murphy, Alex Coke, Alex Foster, Big Al Carson, Andy Dickens, Andrew Bisset, Attila László, Azar Lawrence, Big Time Sarah, Bob Mintzer, Bobby Watson, Bruce Kapler, Chaka Khan, Charles Foster Johnson, Craig Harris, Dan Knight, Danny Gottlieb, Darol Anger, David Benoit, David Torn, Dennis Taylor, Diane Schuur, Dick Oatts, Don Blackman, Earl Klugh, Edward Wilkerson, Erik Balke, Erling Aksdal, Ernest Dawkins, Eugenio Colombo, Federico Ramos, Gary Braith, Gary Valente, Gilberto "Pulpo" Colón Jr., Grant Geissman, Greg Carmichael, Hilario Durán, Ignacio Berroa, Ikue Mori, James Chance, James Chirillo, James Newton, Jeff Berlin, Jeff Hamilton, Jennifer Leitham, Jill Saward, Jimmy Bruno, Joanie Bartels, John Doheny, John Esposito, John Molo, John Shifflett, John Zorn, Jon Burr, Jon Eberson, Jon Faddis, Joseph Bowie, Jørgen Emborg, Kahil El'Zabar, Kazumi Watanabe, Kei Akagi, Ken Navarro, Keni Burke, Kevin Toney, Kurt Maloo, Louis Sclavis, Lyle Mays, Marc Johnson, Masayoshi Takanaka, Michael Di Pasqua, Michael Gregory, Michele Rosewoman, Mike Miller, Mike Stern, Odd Riisnæs, Oleta Adams, Paolo Rustichelli, Paul Dunmall, Paul Wertico, Per Kolstad, Randy Crouch, Randy Halberstadt, Ray Arvizu, Reggie Lucas, Renée Geyer, Rob Burns, Robert Irving III, Sigurd Ulveseth, Stein Erik Tafjord, Steve Barta, Suzanne Davis, T. K. Blue, Taborah Johnson, Tom Cora, Tom Olstad, Trudy Silver, Vidar Johansen, Vic Juris, and Yoshiaki Miyanoue.
- 1952 in jazz, deaths of Cassino Simpson, Fletcher Henderson, Herb Morand, John Kirby, Mal Hallett, Mel Stitzel, Midge Williams, and Zinky Cohn; births of Akio Sasajima, Alan Pasqua, Ali Ryerson, Arlen Roth, Ben Brown, Bent Patey, Bob Mover, Brad Upton, Brian Jackson, Bruce Katz, Carl Haakon Waadeland, Carlo Actis Dato, Chris Brubeck, Chris Joris, Christian Lauba, Chucho Merchán, Clarence Banks, Dave Buxton, Dave DeFries, Dave Valentin, David Knopfler, Ed Neumeister, Eric Leeds, Errol Dyers, Eugene Friesen, Finn Sletten, Gary Lucas, George E. Lewis, Gino Vannelli, Gordon Johnson, Harry Tavitian, Henry Kaiser, Hilton Ruiz, Ichiko Hashimoto, Janis Siegel, Jay Azzolina, Jed Williams, Jeff Linsky, Jeff Lorber, Joe Lovano, John Clayton, John Purcell, Jukka Tolonen, Ken Filiano, Ketil Bjørnstad, Lauren Newton, Laurence Juber, Lee Ritenour, Leni Stern, Leon "Ndugu" Chancler, Manolo Badrena, Mari Natsuki, Mark Dresser, Mathias Rüegg, Michael Marcus, Michael Wolff, Monnette Sudler, Ole Thomsen, Oliver Mtukudzi, Paolo Damiani, Pekka Pohjola, Per Jørgensen, Peter Wolf, Phil Markowitz, Pierre Van Dormael, Radka Toneff, Randy Crawford, Ray Anderson, Reynold Philipsek, Ric Sanders, Richard Tabnik, Rob Mounsey, Roy Campbell Jr., Royce Campbell, Sidsel Endresen, Sue Keller, Timothy J. Tobias, Tony Buck, Uffe Markussen, Uwe Kropinski, Viatcheslav Nazarov, Vince Giordano, William Parker, and Yildiz Ibrahimova.
- 1951 in jazz, deaths of Charlie Creath, Cyril Blake, Doc West, Enrique Santos Discépolo, Mildred Bailey, R.Q. Dickerson, Ray Wetzel, Shirley Clay, Sid Catlett, Valentin Parnakh, and Vic Berton; birth of Alex Blake, Alphonso Johnson, Anthony Davis, António Pinho Vargas, Ashwin Batish, Barry Finnerty, Bill Frisell, Bill MacCormick, Billy Newton-Davis, Bob Berg, Bobby Caldwell, Bobby Previte, Brooks Kerr, Brynjulf Blix, Carla White, Charles Loos, Chris Abrahams, Dennis Irwin, Diedre Murray, Earl Howard, Edwin Birdsong, Fred Sturm, Geoff Eales, Gregory B. Johnson, Håkan Rydin, Herb Robertson, Howard Levy, Hugh Ragin, Idris Ackamoor, Jaco Pastorius, James Williams, Jay Beckenstein, Jemeel Moondoc, Jimmy Haslip, Jimmy Nalls, John Scofield, Jon Rose, Joëlle Léandre, Judi Silvano, Jukka Gustavson, Karen Young, Kenny Werner, Kit McClure, Krister Andersson, La Palabra, Lars Jansson, Lindsay Cooper, Lisle Ellis, Mark Egan, Mark Hennen, Mark Isham, Michael Jefry Stevens, Mitch Woods, Nükhet Ruacan, Peter Gordon, Peter Malick, Phil Collins, Pino Minafra, Poncho Sanchez, Ralph Lalama, Rebecca Parris, Richard Bennett, Richard Niles, Robben Ford, Rocco Prestia, Roland Batik, Roseanna Vitro, Stanley Clarke, Steve Grossman, Steve Lodder, Steve Slagle, Steven Springer, Sting, Sue Evans, Theryl DeClouet, Todd Cochran, Tom Kubis, Tommy Bolin, Trilok Gurtu, Vinicius Cantuária, and Warren Vache.
- 1950 in jazz, deaths of Al Jolson, Al Killian, Alvin Burroughs, Chelsea Quealey, Dol Dauber, Fats Navarro, Freddy Gardner, Leo Watson, Lou Gold, and Ray Perry; births of Alvin Queen, Anthony Lacen, Armen Donelian, Art Baron, Bjørn Kjellemyr, Bobbi Humphrey, Bobby McFerrin, Charles Fambrough, Charlie Kosei, Chuck Greenberg, Curtis Clark, Curtis Fowlkes, Cybill Shepherd, Cyro Baptista, Dag Arnesen, Dagmar Krause, Dee Bell, Dee Dee Bridgewater, Earl Gardner, Fapy Lafertin, François Couturier, Fred Lonzo, Gail Varina Gilmore, George Garzone, Giacomo Gates, Gil Goldstein, Glenn Ferris, Guttorm Guttormsen, Hal Crook, Jean-Jacques Milteau, John D'earth, John Pål Inderberg, Karl Ratzer, Linda Lewis, Luther Thomas, Mark Helias, Marvin Goldstein, Mont Campbell, Natalie Cole, Ndingo Johwa, Paul Kossoff, Pete Jacobsen, Phoebe Snow, Pip Pyle, Pocho La Pantera, Richard Galliano, Robert Bell, Robert Dick, Robert Popwell, Ronnie Foster, Ronnie Laws, Safy Boutella, Stephen Nachmanovitch, Steve Houben, Stjepko Gut, Sveinung Hovensjø, Tony Esposito, Victor Lewis, Vincent Chancey, Walter Becker, and Willie Colón.

== 1940s ==
- 1949 in jazz, deaths of Albert Ammons, Bud Scott, Bunk Johnson, Buster Wilson, Danny Polo, George Baquet, Herbie Haymer, Irving Fazola, Ivie Anderson, Kid Rena, Louis Nelson Delisle, Paul Mares, Seymour Simons, and Snoozer Quinn; births of Allan C. Barnes, Arturo Sandoval, Bernard Lubat, Bill Bruford, Bill Connors, Bill Reichenbach Jr., Carlos Azevedo, Chico Freeman, Chris Laurence, Christy Doran, Danny Mixon, David Attwooll, David Moss, David S. Ware, David Toop, Dennis Davis, Djavan, Duck Baker, Enrico Pieranunzi, Eric Kloss, Fred Frith, Gyula Babos, Harald Halvorsen, Harold Ivory Williams, Jerry Gonzalez, Jerry Goodman, Jesper Zeuthen, Jim McNeely, John Altman, John Wetton, Justo Almario, Kaoru Abe, Kazutoki Umezu, Knut Borge, Konstanty Wilenski, Larry Stabbins, Lenny White, Leon Redbone, Lillian Boutté, Malachi Thompson, Marilyn Scott, Michael Brecker, Michel Herr, Olli Ahvenlahti, Onaje Allan Gumbs, Papa Wemba, Paul Murphy, Per Husby, Peter Guidi, Phil Miller, Philip Kruse, Phyllis Hyman, Pops Mohamed, Rainer Brüninghaus, Randy Sandke, Ray Brown Jr., Raúl di Blasio, Richard James Burgess, Sally Potter, T. S. Monk, Tim Hodgkinson, Thomas Clausen, Tom Waits, Tristan Honsinger, Viktor Paskov, and Vincent Klink.
- 1948 in jazz, deaths of Chano Pozo, Dave Tough, Jan Savitt, Kaiser Marshall, Mutt Carey, Red McKenzie, Sidney Arodin, and Stan Hasselgård; births of Adrian Legg, Aki Takase, Alphonse Mouzon, Anthony Moore, Avery Brooks, Barbara Hendricks, Bill Heid, Bill Pierce, Bill Summers, Bob Moses, Bruce Fowler, Carl Morten Iversen, Carli Muñoz, Carlos Zingaro, Chi Coltrane, Chris Bennett, Chuck Wilson, Clifford Barbaro, Dan Fogel, Danilo Caymmi, Danny Weis, Dave Eshelman, Dave Samuels, David Schnitter, Dennis Rowland, Don Grolnick, Dorothée Berryman, Doug Carn, Emil Viklický, Espen Rud, Fredy Studer, Frode Gjerstad, Fumio Karashima, Gary Brunotte, Geoff Simkins, Guy Van Duser, Hannibal Lokumbe, Harvie Swartz, Henning Gravrok, Henry Butler, Jackie Orszaczky, Jan Kaspersen, Jaroslav Jakubovič, Jessica Williams, Jim Ferguson, Joe Bonner, Joe LaBarbera, John Etheridge, John Madrid, John McNeil, Jon Sholle, Jorge Dalto, Joyce Moreno, Juini Booth, Julia Tsenova, Juma Santos, Karen Borca, Kazimierz Jonkisz, Konrad Kaspersen, Larry Carlton, Lorraine Feather, Mads Vinding, Maggie Nicols, Marc Copland, Marc Jordan, Marva Wright, Marvin Peterson, Michael Cochrane, Mike Richmond, Paquito D'Rivera, Paulinho da Costa, Phil Bowler, Raphe Malik, Ray Reach, Richie Cole, Roger Dean, Roger Frampton, Rose Nabinger, Rubén Blades, Ryo Fukui, Ryoko Moriyama, Stan Sulzmann, Steve Harris, Steve Turre, Tania Maria, Thara Memory, Theo Jörgensmann, Thurman Barker, Tom Scott, Toshinori Kondo, Tsuyoshi Yamamoto, and Victor Hayden.
- 1947 in jazz, deaths of Austin Wylie, Fate Marable, Freddie Webster, Jimmie Lunceford, and Sonny Berman; births of Abdul Wadud, Ahmed Abdullah, Alan Broadbent, Alan Wakeman, Anders Bjørnstad, Andy LaVerne, Art Lande, Baikida Carroll, Barry Guy, Bent Persson, Bern Nix, Bill Stevenson, Billy Bang, Bob Magnusson, Brian Abrahams, Bruce Hampton, Buckwheat Zydeco, Butch Morris, Carlo Domeniconi, Carlos Averhoff, Charles "Bobo" Shaw, Chris Biscoe, Chris Cutler, Christian Escoudé, Chuck Findley, Darius Brubeck, Dean Parks, Dee Daniels, Derf Reklaw, Egberto Gismonti, Eric Ineke, Eugen Gondi, Fedor Frešo, Fred Hopkins, Frank Mantooth, Frank Tusa, Franz Koglmann, Fred Nøddelund, Gary King, Gary M. Anderson, Gerardo Velez, Glenn Spearman, Glenn Zottola, Greg Abate, Gregg Allman, Greg Lake, Gregory Herbert, Grethe Kausland, Guy Klucevsek, Harold Danko, Harvey Mason, Ian Cruickshank, James "Plunky" Branch, Jan Garbarek, Jasper van 't Hof, Jean Carne, Jerry Bergonzi, John Blake Jr., John Horler, John James, Jon Marks, Julie Driscoll, Junko Akimoto, Keith Tippett, Leo Cuypers, Linda Sharrock, Marek Blizinski, Marilyn Crispell, Marty Cook, Melton Mustafa, Miroslav Vitouš, Mwata Bowden, Nick Evans, Norman Connors, Norman Harris, Paco de Lucía, Paul Jackson, Paul Lytton, Paul McCandless, Percy Jones, Radu Goldis, Ray Phiri, Ray Russell, Reggie Houston, Richie Beirach, Ryo Kawasaki, Steve Khan, Stomu Yamashta, Terje Rypdal, Terje Venaas, Tom Malone, Tomasz Szukalski, Uli Beckerhoff, Vladimir Chekasin, and Wesla Whitfield.
- 1946 in jazz, deaths of Fred Beckett, James Tim Brymn, Joseph Petit, Manuel Perez, Putney Dandridge, and Tricky Sam Nanton; births of Al Green, Al Lowe, Allan Holdsworth, André Ceccarelli, Atilla Engin, B. J. Cole, Benjamín Brea, Bennie Wallace, Billy Hancock, Bjørn Kruse, Bo Stief, Bob McHugh, Bruce Ditmas, Bruno Tommaso, Carter Jefferson, Claudio Roditi, Clint Houston, Cooper-Moore, Daryl Hall, Daryl Runswick, Dave Holland, Dave Liebman, Digby Fairweather, Don Moye, Douglas Ewart, Duster Bennett, Ellade Bandini, Frank Gibson Jr., George Duke, Guilherme Franco, Helen Shapiro, Humphrey Carpenter, Ivar Antonsen, J. Geils, Jac Berrocal, Jack Schaeffer, Jack Walrath, Jerome Cooper, Jerry Jemmott, Jimmy Ponder, Joel Forrester, Joel Futterman, John Klemmer, John Sheridan, Ken Hyder, Khan Jamal, Kimiko Itoh, Knut Kristiansen, Marion Cowings, Martin Kratochvíl, Melvin Sparks, Michael S. Smith, Mike Clark, Mike Renzi, Niels-Henning Ørsted Pedersen, Palle Danielsson, Patty Waters, Per Henrik Wallin, Peter Langston, Phil Treloar, Pierre Dørge, Ray Drummond, Raymond Harry Brown, René McLean, Riccardo Zegna, Roger Turner, Roland Prince, Rudolf Tomsits, Spike Wells, Stafford James, Su Cruickshank, Susannah McCorkle, Ted Greene, Terry Bradds, Terry Kath, Tom Grant, Tom Harrell, Toquinho, Trent Kynaston, Tullio De Piscopo, Vinny Golia, William Hooker, and Zbigniew Seifert.
- 1945 in jazz, deaths of Bobby Stark, Jack Jenney, Josef Taussig, Nat Jaffe, Pha Terrell, Richard M. Jones, Teddy Weatherford, and Tubby Hall; births of Akira Sakata, Anthony Braxton, Arild Andersen, Bill Stapleton, Bjørn Alterhaug, Bjørnar Andresen, Bob Maize, Bob Rockwell, Bob Stewart, Brian Godding, Bryan Spring, Cameron Brown, Carol Kidd, Colin Hodgkinson, Daniel Carter, Danny Gatton, David Grisman, David Sanborn, Demetrio Stratos, Dominic Duval, Doug Riley, Ed Soph, Edward Vesala, Eliana Pittman, Elis Regina, Elton Dean, Ernie Krivda, Ernie Watts, Halvard Kausland, Geoff Leigh, George Finola, Harry Pepl, Henri Texier, Hugh Hopper, Jim Mullen, Joe Beck, John Betsch, John LaBarbera, John Stubblefield, Johnny "Dandy" Rodriguez Jr, Johnny Dyani, Josef Vejvoda, Kaj Backlund, Keith Jarrett, Keith Nichols, Kimiko Kasai, Knut Riisnæs, Leszek Żądło, Lou Marini, Magni Wentzel, Mark Kramer, Michael Moore, Mick Goodrick, Mongezi Feza, Murray Wall, Ole Kock Hansen, Pete Christlieb, Peter Ecklund, Randy Brecker, Steve Berrios, Steve Gadd, Steve Gregory, Svein Finnerud, Sylvia Vrethammar, Terje Bjørklund, Terry Callier, Thomas Mapfumo, Tom Coppola, Tony Williams, Trevor Richards, Vaughn Wiester, and Victor Assis Brasil.
- 1944 in jazz, deaths of Bob Zurke, Clarence Profit, Glenn Miller, Jimmie Noone, Miklós Vig, O'Neill Spencer, Rod Cless, Tommy Stevenson, and Yank Porter; births of Aage Teigen, Albert Stinson, Alex Acuña, Alvin Lee, Ari Brown, Arthur Doyle, Babik Reinhardt, Barbara Thompson, Bernie Senensky, Bernie Worrell, Bill Mays, Billy Cobham, Bob Degen, Bobby Battle, Bobby Naughton, Bobo Stenson, Butch Miles, Candy Johnson, Carlos Inzillo, Carol Grimes, Charles Sullivan, Chico Buarque, Chris Spedding, Chris Wood, Chuck Domanico, Cynthia Robinson, Dave Cliff, David Friedman, David Goloschekin, Diana Ross, Didier Levallet, Don Sickler, Eddie Gómez, Erling Wicklund, Evan Parker, Frank Sinatra Jr., Fred Hess, George Cables, George Mraz, Gianluigi Trovesi, Harvey Brooks, Henry Threadgill, Howard Wyeth, Iris Williams, Jack Wilkins, Jan Erik Kongshaug, Jazz Summers, Jeff Beck, Joachim Kühn, John Abercrombie, John Clark, John Gross, John Renbourn, John Surman, Jon Hiseman, Judy Chamberlain, Karl Jenkins, Keith Emerson, Kenneth Ascher, Kenny "Blues Boss" Wayne, Kiri Te Kanawa, Kosuke Mine, Lars Edegran, Lew Soloff, Louis Stewart, Mark Charig, Martha Brooks, Martin Drew, Michael Carvin, Michael Franks, Monty Alexander, Naná Vasconcelos, Oddbjørn Blindheim, Orange Kellin, Oscar Brashear, Pat LaBarbera, Pat Martino, Peter Kowald, Phil Wachsmann, Ralph MacDonald, Randy Jones, Richard Dunbar, Roger Humphries, Ron Mathewson, Roy Hellvin, Rufus Reid, Saheb Sarbib, Salena Jones, Sebastião Tapajós, Sherman Ferguson, Steve Reid, Steve Tyrell, Terry Clarke, Tom Parker, Vyacheslav Ganelin, Wally Shoup, Warren Tartaglia, Willem Breuker, and Woody Shaw.
- 1943 in jazz, deaths of Armand J. Piron, Ben Bernie, Corky Cornelius, Fats Waller, Leon Roppolo, Min Leibrook, Tamara Drasin, Tiny Parham, Vaughn De Leath, and Zue Robertson; births of Al Foster, Alan Lawrence Turnbull, Barry Altschul, Ben Sidran, Billy Harper, Bjørn Krokfoss, Bobby Enriquez, Brian Hopper, Butch Thompson, Calvin Keys, Claudio Mattone, Claudio Slon, Clyde Stubblefield, Conny Bauer, David Horler, Dick Halligan, Didier Malherbe, Duncan Swift, Edu Lobo, Felix Slováček, Frank Lowe, Fred Tompkins, Fred Wesley, Freddie Waits, Fritz Pauer, Garrett List, Gary Burghoff, Gary Burton, Gavin Bryars, George Benson, Georgie Fame, Gerry Niewood, Grover Washington Jr., Howie Smith, Jack Bruce, Jerry Rusch, Jiggs Whigham, Jon Christensen, Joni Mitchell, Keith Relf, Kenny Barron, Kjell Öhman, Larry Coryell, Laurie Allan, Leny Andrade, Lucio Dalla, Maarten Altena, Maceo Parker, Manfred Eicher, Marcos Valle, Mayuto Correa, Michael Mantler, Michal Urbaniak, Newman Taylor Baker, Noah Howard, Pete Cosey, Pete Minger, Peter Boothman, Peter Lipa, Phil Lee, Pino Presti, Richard Anthony Hewson, Richard Wright, Richie Pratt, Ricky May, Skip Prokop, Steve Gilmore, Steve Potts, Sven-Åke Johansson, Ted Milton, Terry Smith, Thorgeir Stubø, Tony Campise, Urszula Dudziak, Valery Ponomarev, Vivian Stanshall, Volker Kriegel, Webster Lewis, Weldon Irvine, Willie Murphy, and Winston Mankunku Ngozi.
- 1942 in jazz, deaths of Bunny Berigan, Charlie Christian, Jaroslav Ježek, Jimmy Blanton, Leo Adde, and Willie Cornish; births of Alan Skidmore, Amina Claudine Myers, Andrew White, Andy Summers, Aretha Franklin, Art Murphy, Bill Elgart, Bill Goodwin, Buster Williams, Byard Lancaster, Carl Saunders, Carlton Kitto, Cecil Bridgewater, Charles Braugham, Charles Tolliver, Cornell Dupree, Curtis Mayfield, Dan Jacobs, Dave Bargeron, Dave Green, David Friesen, Dave Matthews, Ditlef Eckhoff, Donald Ayler, Doug Hammond, Flora Purim, Frankie Lymon, Geoff Bull, Graeme Lyall, Han Bennink, Jack DeJohnette, James Blood Ulmer, Jane Getz, Jean-Luc Ponty, Jeremy Steig, Jim Douglas, Jimmy Owens, Jiří Stivín, Jocelyne Jocya, Joe Chambers, John McLaughlin, John Taylor, Jon Lucien, Keith Ingham, Leon Russell, Letta Mbulu, Lionel Grigson, Lonnie Smith, Lyman Woodard, Maki Asakawa, Marc Moulin, Marlena Shaw, Michel Donato, Mike Abene, Nara Leão, Oliver Lake, Peter Lemer, Philip Catherine, Pocho Lapouble, Randolph Colville, Ranee Lee, Richard Badendyck, Richard Stoltzman, Robin Kenyatta, Rusty Jones, Sammy Rimington, Steve Brown, Terje Fjærn, Terumasa Hino, Teruo Nakamura, Tim Maia, Tomasz Stanko, Torgrim Sollid, Walter Payton, Wendell Harrison, Yōsuke Yamashita, and Zdzisław Piernik.
- 1941 in jazz, deaths of Casper Reardon, David Plunket Greene, Dick Wilson, Frank Melrose, Jelly Roll Morton, Ken Snakehips Johnson, Nisse Lind, and Steve Lewis; births of Adelhard Roidinger, Airto Moreira, Aldo Romano, Alfred "Pee Wee" Ellis, Anders Linder, Annette Peacock, Barry Martyn, Bernard Purdie, Bobby Hutcherson, Bobby Matos, Bobby Shew, Captain Beefheart, Carmen Fanzone, Carola Standertskjöld, Cesária Évora, Charles Earland, Charlie Watts, Chick Corea, Chu Berry, Chucho Valdés, Clifford Jarvis, Connie Crothers, Cornel Chiriac, David T. Walker, Don Grusin, Don Pullen, Don Weller, Eddie Daniels, Eddie Gale, Eddy Louiss, Eleni Karaindrou, Elisa Gabbai, Eric Burdon, Franco Ambrosetti, Frankie Armstrong, Franco D'Andrea, Fredrik Norén, Gary Barone, Gary Windo, Gia Maione, Glen Moore, Hank Marvin, Harry Miller, Herbie Lewis, Howard Johnson, Hugo Rasmussen, Irène Schweizer, Janusz Muniak, Jay Clayton, Jesper Thilo, Jim Cullum Jr., Jim Pepper, Jim Richardson, Jim Riggs, John C. Marshall, John Hicks, John Marshall, John Von Ohlen, Jonas Gwangwa, Knut Kiesewetter, Lajos Dudas, LaMont Johnson, Lars Sjösten, Lenny Breau, Lester Bowie, Louis Banks, Lowell Davidson, Masahiko Satoh, Maurice White, Meredith D'Ambrosio, Michael Moriarty, Mickey Tucker, Mike Osborne, Miles Kington, Milford Graves, Norma Winstone, Olu Dara, P. J. Perry, Palle Mikkelborg, Pete Yellin, Peter Brötzmann, Phil Upchurch, Phillip Wilson, Putter Smith, R. Winston Morris, Ray Thomas, Rick Laird, Robertinho Silva, Roger Neumann, Rogier van Otterloo, Ron McClure, Ronnie Cuber, Stanley Cowell, Sérgio Mendes, Svein Christiansen, Teppo Hauta-aho, Terry Rosen, Tim Hauser, Tom Coster, Trevor Tomkins, Uli Trepte, Wadada Leo Smith, and Wayne Dockery.
- 1940 in jazz, deaths of Arthur Whetsel, Charley Straight, Charlie Dixon, Curtis Boyd, Einar Aaron Swan, Guy Kelly, Hal Kemp, Johnny Dodds, and Walter Barnes; births of Adam Makowicz, Al Jarreau, Alan Kay, Alex Riel, Allan Botschinsky, Arthur Blythe, Astrud Gilberto, Bennie Maupin, Billy Hart, Bjørn Johansen, Bjørn Stokstad, Bob Cornford, Bob Kerr, Bobby Graham, Boris Lindqvist, Brian Priestley, Carlos Ward, Casey Jones, Chuck Mangione, Chuck Rainey, Clem Curtis, Dave Burrell, Dave MacRae, Dick Morrissey, Dick Shearer, Don Myrick, Don Thompson, Doudou Gouirand, Eberhard Weber, Eddie Henderson, Egil Kapstad, Frank Zappa, Frode Thingnæs, Gary Bartz, Gene Perla, George Adams, Gustavo Bergalli, Hamiet Bluiett, Hans Dulfer, Henry Franklin, Herbie Hancock, James Dapogny, Janet Lawson, Jay Leonhart, Jerry Granelli, John Brunious, John DeFrancesco, John Pochee, John Roache, John Stevens, Karel Růžička, Kenny Cox, Keith Smith, Kenny Rankin, Larry Rosen, Larry Willis, Larry Young, Laudir de Oliveira, Lew Tabackin, Lindsay L. Cooper, Lisle Atkinson, Lonnie Hillyer, Lonnie Liston Smith, Louis Moholo, Lyn Cornell, Manfred Mann, Mani Neumeier, Mario Pavone, Maurice J. Summerfield, Mick Pyne, Mike Nock, Monica Dominique, Nancy King, Neal Creque, Ole Jacob Hansen, Paul Rutherford, Peter King, Pharoah Sanders, Pierre Courbois, Ralph Towner, Ramon Carranza, Ray Draper, Rod Mason, Roger Dawson, Ronald Shannon Jackson, Roscoe Mitchell, Roy Ayers, S. Frederick Starr, Sirone, Sonny Sharrock, Steve Swallow, Sue Raney, Terri Quaye, Thurman Green, Tom McGrath, Tony Levin, Vagif Mustafazadeh, Waymon Reed, Wendell Logan, and Wilton Felder.

== 1930s ==
- 1939 in jazz, deaths of Charlie Irvis, Chick Webb, Herschel Evans, John Robichaux, Louis Douglas, Ma Rainey, and Tommy Ladnier; births of Abu Talib, Aladár Pege, Alan Silva, Albert Dailey, Andrew Cyrille, Andrzej Jastrzebski, Andy Bey, Art Themen, Bill Watrous, Bob James, Brian Auger, Brian Smith, Bruce Cale, Butch Warren, Campbell Burnap, Carlos Emilio Morales, Carlos Lyra, Charles Gayle, Charles McPherson, Chris Karan, Chris Pyne, Christer Boustedt, Claudio Fasoli, Cleveland Eaton, Csaba Deseo, Derek Wadsworth, Dianne Brooks, Dick Berk, Dick Griffin, Don Alias, Elaine Delmar, Enrico Rava, George Braith, Ginger Baker, Greetje Kauffeld, György Szabados, Harald Heide-Steen Jr., Hartmut Geerken, Henrik Otto Donner, Hubert Laws, Hugh Masekela, Idris Muhammad, Jair Rodrigues, James Booker, Jamey Aebersold, Jan Erik Vold, Jeanne Lee, Jorge Anders, Joe McPhee, Joe Roccisano, Joe Sample, Kate Westbrook, Kent Carter, Larry Harlow, Lou Gare, Mario Rivera, Marvin Stamm, Mary Stallings, Masabumi Kikuchi, Meco, Michel Colombier, Mike Cotton, Mike Longo, Nick Ceroli, Niels Jørgen Steen, Okay Temiz, Ove Stokstad, Patrick Williams, Paul Winter, Pekka Pöyry, Phil Ranelin, Richard Teitelbaum, Roger Kellaway, Rosa King, Sam Brown, Sonny Fortune, Steve Marcus, Tommy Stewart, Tony Hatch, Trevor Watts, Virgil Jones, Wayne Henderson, Wojciech Karolak, and Zbigniew Namyslowski.
- 1938 in jazz, deaths of Dick McDonough, Garnet Clark, Joe "King" Oliver, and Robert Johnson; births of Al Arsenault, Alexander von Schlippenbach, Alf Kjellman, Arnie Lawrence, Barry Buckley, Bob Parlocha, Booker Little, Buschi Niebergall, Charles Lloyd, Charles Neville, Daevid Allen, Daniel Humair, Dave Pike, Dennis Budimir, Denny Zeitlin, Dick Sudhalter, Don "Sugarcane" Harris, Dudu Pukwana, Eddie Marshall, Eje Thelin, Eric Gale, Etta James, Fela Kuti, Fred Braceful, Freddie Hubbard, Gap Mangione, Gennady Golstain, Gerd Dudek, Gugge Hedrenius, Hal Galper, Harrison Ridley Jr., Jaki Liebezeit, Jean-Pierre Gebler, Jimmie Smith, Jimmy Carl Black, Jimmy Hastings, Joanne Brackeen, John Coates Jr., John "Jabo" Starks, Jon Mayer, Julius Hemphill, Kjell Bartholdsen, Laco Déczi, Lee Morgan, Lill-Babs, Louie Ramirez, Luigi Trussardi, Mark Levine, Marzette Watts, McCoy Tyner, Michael Joseph Smith, Mike Mainieri, Mike Wofford, Monty Waters, Odean Pope, Pat LaCroix, Perry Robinson, Pete La Roca, Pete Strange, Peter King, Petr Skoumal, Ray Warleigh, Rhoda Scott, Robert Schulz, Ross Tompkins, Roy Brooks, Ruth Price, Sal Nistico, Slim Richey, Steve Kuhn, Stix Hooper, Stu Martin, Tommy Vig, Tony Oxley, Warren Bernhardt, Wilson Simonal, and William Thomas McKinley.
- 1937 in jazz, deaths of Alex Hill, Bessie Smith, George Gershwin, Johnny Dunn, and Ward Pinkett; birth of Alice Coltrane, Archie Shepp, Baden Powell, Barbara Jay, Barney Wilen, Barry Vercoe, Beegie Adair, Bernie McGann, Bernt Rosengren, Big Bill Bissonnette, Bill Cole, Billy Stewart, Bob Achilles, Bob Downes, Bobby Durham, Börje Fredriksson, Bosse Broberg, Brad Terry, Brian Browne, Brian Lemon, Bud Brisbois, Burton Greene, Carol Sloane, Charlie Haden, Charlie Shoemake, Charly Antolini, Claes Andersson, Don Moore, Don Randi, Ed Polcer, Eddie Gladden, Eddie Shaw, Elza Soares, Erik Amundsen, Ernie Carson, Frank Strozier, Fred Van Hove, Gene Bertoncini, Gene Ludwig, George Bohanon, Gordon Brisker, Grachan Moncur III, Graham Collier, Guido Basso, Guitar Gable, Gunter Hampel, Horace Arnold, Humberto Clayber, J. R. Mitchell, Jack Nitzsche, James Spaulding, Janne Carlsson, Jeannie Cheatham, Jeff Clyne, Joe Farrell, Joe Gallivan, Joe Henderson, John Crocker, Joseph Jarman, Karin Krog, Kirk Lightsey, Larry Ridley, Len Skeat, Leon Thomas, Louis Hayes, Louis Satterfield, Malcolm Cecil, Mark Whitecage, Michael Gibbs, Mike Carr, Mike Melvoin, Milcho Leviev, Miúcha, Monica Zetterlund, Nancy Wilson, Nathan Davis, Neil Ardley, Neville Dickie, Olly Wilson, Paolo Conte, Phil Wilson, Pierre Favre, Rafig Babayev, Reggie Workman, Robert Walker, Ron Carter, Roy Williams, Spanky DeBrest, Ted Dunbar, Toni Harper, and Wilber Morris.
- 1936 in jazz, deaths of Mike Bernard, Mitja Nikisch, and Sam Morgan; birth of Alan Branscombe, Albert Ayler, Alfredo Rodríguez, Amancio D'Silva, Arthur Jenkins, Beaver Harris, Bill Ashton, Billy Higgins, Billy James, Bobby Darin, Bobby Wellins, Brian Dee, Buell Neidlinger, Byrdie Green, Carla Bley, Carmell Jones, Charles Turner, Chris McGregor, Chris White, Chuck Israels, Claude Nobs, Clifford Thornton, Colin Purbrook, Corky Hale, Cynthia Crane, Dave Van Ronk, Don Cherry, Don Menza, Don Patterson, Eddie Palmieri, Eldee Young, Emmett Chapman, Eric Allandale, Erwin Helfer, Garnett Brown, Gábor Szabó, Harold Mabern, Harold Vick, Hermeto Pascoal, Hod O'Brien, J. C. Moses, Jack Wilson, Jan Byrczek, Jan Ptaszyn Wróblewski, Jim Galloway, Jimmy McGriff, Joe Diorio, Joe Haider, John Boudreaux, John Tchicai, June Tyson, Kalaparusha Maurice McIntyre, Klaus Doldinger, Larry Gales, Lars Erstrand, Lex Humphries, Lin Halliday, Luiz Eça, Manfred Schoof, Manfredo Fest, Marcus Belgrave, Martha Mier, Maysa Matarazzo, Melvin Rhyne, Mike Barone, Mike Westbrook, Muhammad Ali, Nick Brignola, Rolv Wesenlund, Roy McCurdy, Rudi Wilfer, Rufus Harley, Salah Ragab, Sathima Bea Benjamin, Scott LaFaro, Shirley Bunnie Foy, Snooks Eaglin, Sonny Greenwich, Sonny Bravo, Sonny Phillips, Stan Robinson, Sunny Murray, Takashi Furuya, Tom Vaughn, Tommy Banks, Tommy LiPuma, and Wilson das Neves.
- 1935 in jazz, deaths of Bennie Moten, Cecil Irwin, Charlie Green, Edwin Swayze, and Honoré Dutrey; births of Alan Haven, Albert Heath, Allan Jaffe, Alvin Fielder, Barry Rogers, Ben Dixon, Bent Jædig, Bjarne Liller, Bobby Few, Bobby Timmons, Bunky Green, Cecil McBee, Charlie Tagawa, Chuck Flores, Dannie Richmond, Dino Saluzzi, Don Friedman, Don Rader, Dorothy Masuka, Dudley Moore, Eddie Khan, Emil Mijares, Enrico Intra, Enzo Jannacci, Esther Phillips, François Jeanneau, Frank Hewitt, Frank Wright, Fred Stone, Gary Peacock, Gene Cherico, George Coleman, George Golla, Getatchew Mekurya, Giuseppi Logan, Gordon Beck, Grant Green, Harry Beckett, Harry Leahey, Henry Grimes, Heraldo do Monte, Herb Alpert, Herbie Phillips, Hugh Lawson, James Clay, James Cotton, Jerzy Milian, Jimmy D'Aquisto, Joe Lee Wilson, John Patton, Johnny Helms, Johnny Mathis, Judy Bailey, Juhani Aaltonen, Julian Priester, Julius Wechter, Karl Berger, Kenny Davern, Kidd Jordan, Les McCann, Michel Portal, Milton Banana, Misha Mengelberg, Nino Tempo, Noel Kelehan, Orlando Marin, Paul Chambers, Paul Humphrey, Pete Escovedo, Peter Herbolzheimer, Rahsaan Roland Kirk, Ramsey Lewis, Ran Blake, Reuben Wilson, Rob McConnell, Rodgers Grant, Roland Alexander, Ronnie Boykins, Ronnie Mathews, Roswell Rudd, Stan McDonald, Ted Curson, Terry Lightfoot, Tore Jensen, Totti Bergh, Trevor Koehler, Tubby Hayes, Tülay German, Valerie Capers, Vic Vogel, Woody Allen, and Yasunao Tone.
- 1934 in jazz, deaths of Alcide Nunez, Amiri Baraka, Eddie Anthony, Gene Rodemich, Jack Carey, and Russ Columbo; births of Abdullah Ibrahim, Ahmad Alaadeen, Art Davis, Art Porter Sr., Bảo Vàng, Barre Phillips, Bill Chase, Bob Cunningham, Bob Northern, Bob Wallis, Bobby Bradford, Bobby Bryant, Cedar Walton, Colin Bailey, Colin Smith, Dave Grusin, Delisa Newton, Dick Heckstall-Smith, Don Ellis, Don Bailey, Doug Watkins, Eddie Harris, Egil Johansen, Ellis Marsalis Jr., Ethel Azama, Eva Olmerová, Georg Riedel, Georgy Garanian, Gino Paoli, Hacke Björksten, Hank Crawford, Horace Tapscott, Houston Person, Ib Glindemann, Inger Berggren, Ivan Jullien, Jacques Loussier, Jan Allan, Jayne Cortez, Jimmy Garrison, Jimmy Woods, Joe Licari, John Critchinson, John Picard, Junior Cook, King Curtis, Kirk Stuart, Lanny Morgan, Marion Montgomery, Merl Saunders, Norio Maeda, Norman Edge, Janette Mason, Pat Moran McCoy, Phil Ramone, Pim Jacobs, Ray Mantilla, Raymond Premru, Rudy Collins, Selçuk Sun, Sheila Tracy, Shirley Horn, Shirley Scott, Stanley Turrentine, Steve Lacy, Sylvia Telles, Teri Thornton, Terry Cryer, Tony Coe, Tony Lee, Victor Feldman, Victor Gaskin, Vinko Globokar, Wade Legge, Warren Chiasson, Warren Smith, and Willie Bobo.
- 1933 in jazz, deaths of Eddie Lang, Freddie Keppard, and William Krell; births of Andrzej Trzaskowski, Ann Burton, Asmund Bjørken, Baby Face Willette, Ben Riley, Bill Dowdy, Bill Hardman, Bill Saragih, Billy Bean, Billy Paul, Borah Bergman, Brian Brown, Bross Townsend, Cal Collins, Calvin Newborn, Charles Davis, Charles Kynard, Dave Frishberg, David "Fathead" Newman, Denis Charles, Dick Maloney, Donald Bailey, Duke Carl Gregor of Mecklenburg, Eivind Solberg, Frank Morgan, Gary McFarland, Gene Harris, Herman Riley, Hideo Shiraki, Ian Carr, Jack Petersen, Jim Newman, Jimmy Dotson, John Handy, John Ore, Johnny "Hammond" Smith, Lanny Steele, Lazy Lester, Leo Wright, Lonnie Brooks, Lou Rawls, Mario Schiano, Marlene VerPlanck, Michael Garrick, Michael White, Nikele Moyake, Nina Simone, Oliver Jackson, Orlando "Cachaito" López, Paul Jeffrey, Quincy Jones, Rashied Ali, Ronnie Ross, Rudolf Dašek, Rune Gustafsson, Sadao Watanabe, Sonny Simmons, Spike Heatley, Steve McCall, Stu Williamson, Sture Nordin, Tete Montoliu, Trudy Pitts, Walter Booker, and Wayne Shorter.
- 1932 in jazz, deaths of Frank Teschemacher, James "Bubber" Miley, Virginia Liston; births of Åke Persson, Akitoshi Igarashi, Al Aarons, Al Levitt, Alan Shorter, Alvin Batiste, Andy Simpkins, Atle Hammer, Ben Aronov, Bengt Hallberg, Bob Cranshaw, Bob Florence, Bobby Cole, Coleridge-Taylor Perkinson, Curtis Fuller, Dave MacKay, David Izenzon, Dick Charlesworth, Don Francks, Don Wilkerson, Donald Byrd, Dorothy Ashby, Duke Pearson, Earl Gill, Ed Bickert, Ed Lincoln, Eddie Higgins, Emil Richards, Ethel Ennis, Gato Barbieri, Gene Russell, Grady Tate, Hadley Caliman, Harold Rubin, Ian Hamer, Irene Kral, Jack Reilly, Jamil Nasser, Jerry Dodgion, Joe Zawinul, John Barnes, John Burch, John Chilton, Johnny Lytle, János Gonda, Keely Smith, Kiane Zawadi, Lalo Schifrin, Leo Welch, Leroy Jenkins, Les Spann, Lol Coxhill, Mark Murphy, Masaru Imada, Masayuki Takayanagi, Michel Legrand, Mickey Roker, Miriam Makeba, Oliver Nelson, Ottilie Patterson, Paul Bley, Pete Jolly, Rauno Lehtinen, Robin Douglas-Home, Roland Hanna, Shelley Moore, Shoji Suzuki, Slide Hampton, Sonny Red, Teddy Smith, Tina Brooks, Walter Davis Jr., Walter Perkins, Walter Wanderley, Webster Young, Whitey Mitchell, and Willis Jackson.
- 1931 in jazz, deaths of Bix Beiderbecke, Buddie Petit, Buddy Bolden, Jimmy Blythe, and Jimmy Harrison; births of Alain Goraguer, Alfred Brendel, Allan Ganley, Alvin Lucier, Andrew Hill, Bobby Lamb, Carson Smith, Caterina Valente, Clifford Jordan, D. J. Fontana, David Axelrod, David Baker, Della Reese, Derek Smith, Dewey Redman, Dick Garcia, Dick Twardzik, Diz Disley, Dizzy Reece, Dominic Frontiere, Duško Gojković, Ed Cassidy, Frank Marocco, Franco Manzecchi, Frank Capp, Freddy Cole, Freddie Roach, Gene Gammage, Georges Arvanitas, Gianni Coscia, Gil Mellé, Gloria Lynne, Hachidai Nakamura, Harold Battiste, Harold McNair, Horace Parlan, Ira Sullivan, Jack Sheldon, Jackie McLean, Jake Hanna, Jan Johansson, Jimmy Lyons, João Gilberto, Joe Cuba, John Gilmore, John Jenkins, John Pisano, Johnny Răducanu, Junior Walker, Karel Velebný, Keith Christie, Kenny Burrell, Krzysztof Komeda, Leon Spencer, Lionel Batiste, Long John Hunter, Lonnie Donegan, Louis Albert, Louis Smith, Makanda Ken McIntyre, Marion Brown, Mike Pratt, Monique Albert, Nat Adderley, Patti Bown, Paul Motian, Phil Bates, Phil Woods, Phineas Newborn Jr., Plas Johnson, Ray Bryant, Raymond Berthiaume, Richard Holmes, Richard Williams, Richie Powell, Roland Alphonso, Ronnie Bedford, Rose Brennan, Sam Cooke, Sonny Clark, Sonny Dallas, Sonya Hedenbratt, Tab Hunter, Teresa Brewer, Terry Pollard, Thandi Klaasen, Theo Bophela, Walt Dickerson, Walt Groller, Walter Norris, Wayne Andre, Willie Pickens, Willie Ruff, and Wynton Kelly.
- 1930 in jazz, births of Abbey Lincoln, Ack van Rooyen, Ahmad Jamal, Andy White, Annie Ross, Ben Tucker, Benny Powell, Big Tiny Little, Bill Berry, Bill Eyden, Bill Hughes, Blue Mitchell, Bob Hammer, Bob Havens, Booker Ervin, Buddy Bregman, Buddy Montgomery, Chris Barber, Christiane Legrand, Claude Bolling, Clifford Brown, Dakota Staton, Dave McKenna, David Amram, Derek Bailey, Derek Humble, Donald Washington Sr., Ed Thigpen, Ed Wiley Jr., Eddie Bo, Eddie Costa, Eddie Locke, Einar Iversen, Eric Dixon, Erich Kleinschuster, Erik Moseholm, Francis Coppieters, Frank Strazzeri, Friedrich Gulda, George Girard, Gerhard Aspheim, Grover Mitchell, Hank Garland, Hank Mobley, Helen Merrill, Herb Pomeroy, Herbie Mann, Irene Reid, Jack Nimitz, Jack Sharpe, Jackie Dougan, Jay Migliori, Jim Hall, Jimmy Deuchar, Joe Maini, Joe Porcaro, John Fischer, John Mayer, John Neely, Johnny Varro, Joyce Collins, Kenny Ball, Kenny Wheeler, Little Walter, Marilyn Moore, Marty Grosz, Maxine Daniels, Mike Zwerin, Mikkel Flagstad, Morgana King, Muhal Richard Abrams, Nancy Harrow, Ornette Coleman, Oscar Klein, Papa Bue, Pat Halcox, Paul Horn, Pepper Adams, Pete Fountain, Ray Charles, Richard B. Boone, Richard Davis, Richie Kamuca, Rolf Billberg, Ron Collier, Ronnell Bright, Roy Fisher, Sabu Martinez, Sam Most, Sam Noto, Shungo Sawada, Sivuca, Sonny Rollins, Spike Robinson, Stan Greig, Tommy Bryant, Tommy Flanagan, Tommy Tedesco, Vic Ash, and Walter Benton.

== 1920s ==
- 1929 in jazz, deaths of Blind Lemon Jefferson, Chris Kelly, Don Murray, and Pinetop Smith; birth of Acker Bilk, Al Dreares, Alan Dawson, Alex Welsh, Algia Mae Hinton, Art Taylor, Arthur Prysock, Ayten Alpman, Barry Harris, Benny Golson, Betty Carter, Betty Loo Taylor, Bill Evans, Bob Brookmeyer, Buster Cooper, Calvin Jones, Cecil Taylor, Charles Moffett, Charlie Persip, Chet Baker, Curtis Amy, Cy Coleman, Danny Barcelona, Dave Shepherd, Dupree Bolton, Ed Blackwell, Ed Shaughnessy, Eddie Jones, Edmund Percey, Eiji Kitamura, Elmon Wright, Francy Boland, Frankie Sakai, Fred Anderson, G. T. Hogan, Gabe Baltazar, Gene Taylor, Gildo Mahones, Giorgio Gaslini, Guylaine Guy, Harold Ousley, Harry South, Howard Roberts, Jack Noren, James Last, Jacques Denjean, Jimmy Cobb, Joe Pass, Joe Temperley, John Armatage, John Carter, Julian Euell, Karl Drewo, Kenny Clare, Larance Marable, Lennie Niehaus, Lorez Alexandria, Luděk Hulan, Matt Murphy, Maurice Simon, Mel Lewis, Mel Stewart, Mike Elliott, Nick Stabulas, Noel DaCosta, Pedro Iturralde, Pete King, Prince Lasha, Ray Barretto, Red Balaban, Rich Matteson, Rolf Kühn, Roy Crimmins, Rusty Bryant, Sandy Brown, Sandy Mosse, Sil Austin, Simon Flem Devold, Sonny Russo, Susie Garrett, Teddi King, Tommy Newsom, Toshiko Akiyoshi, Valdo Williams, Walt Levinsky, and Yusuf Salim.
- 1928 in jazz, deaths of Jimmy O'Bryant, and Stump Evans; births of Addison Farmer, Al Belletto, Alan Abel, Alan Littlejohn, Albert Mangelsdorff, Aldemaro Romero, Alfredo "Chocolate" Armenteros, Archie Semple, Art Farmer, Audrey Morris, Beverly Kenney, Bill Potts, Bob Badgley, Bob Gordon, Bob Wilber, Bobby Jones, Bobby Orr, Cal Massey, Cannonball Adderley, Carl Fontana, Carl Perkins, Chuck Andrus, Clare Fischer, Conrad Janis, Dave Black, Derek Hogg, Dick Nash, Don Burrows, Don Lanphere, Ed Summerlin, Eddie Hubble, Egil Monn-Iversen, Eric Dolphy, Ernestine Anderson, Ernie Farrow, Errol Buddle, Etta Jones, Fats Domino, Frank Butler, Frank Foster, Frank Parr, Frank Tiberi, Frankie Dunlop, Fraser MacPherson, Freddie Redd, Gene Allen, Gil Coggins, Hal Stein, Hampton Hawes, Harold Land, Herb Geller, Herman Foster, Horace Silver, Jack Kevorkian, Jack Montrose, Jackie Cain, Jay Cameron, Jerry van Rooyen, Jerzy Matuszkiewicz, Jimmy Campbell, Jimmy Smith, Joe Gordon, Joe Harriott, Joe Morello, Joe Muranyi, John Brimhall, John Sangster, Johnny Griffin, Jon Eardley, Junior Mance, Ken Colyer, Kenny Drew, Keshav Sathe, Keter Betts, Koko Taylor, Konstantin Orbelyan, Larry Bunker, Lars Gullin, Leroy Vinnegar, Lorraine Geller, Lou Levy, Lyn Christie, Marilyn Maye, Max Bennett, Maynard Ferguson, Michel Gaudry, Mick Mulligan, Mike Daniels, Moe Koffman, Monty Sunshine, Nelson Boyd, Norman Amadio, Peter Appleyard, Peter Ind, Priscilla Bowman, Richard Wyands, Rick Henderson, Ronaldo Bôscoli, Ruth Brown, Seldon Powell, Sheila Jordan, Ted Joans, Teddy Charles, Teddy Kotick, Tommy Turrentine, Vernel Fournier, Vi Redd, Vic Damone, Vince Guaraldi, Werner Dies, Wilbur Little, William Russo, and Willie Maiden.
- 1927 in jazz, deaths of Florence Mills and Louis Cottrell, Sr.; births of Ahmed Abdul-Malik, Akira Miyazawa, Al Fairweather, Al Martino, Allen Eager, Andy McGhee, Anita Kerr, Antônio Carlos Jobim, Attila Zoller, Barbara Dane, Basil Kirchin, Benny Green, Bhumibol Adulyadej, Big Jay McNeely, Bill Crow, Bill Holman, Bill Le Sage, Billy Byers, Buck Hill, Bucky Calabrese, Buddy Banks, Charles Greenlee, Charlie Callas, Charlie Kennedy, Chris Connor, Chuck Stewart, Cleo Laine, Clora Bryant, Colette Bonheur, Connie Kay, Conte Candoli, Cy Touff, Danny Moss, Dick Hyman, Dick Noel, Dick Wellstood, Dick Wetmore, Doc Severinsen, Dolo Coker, Don Bagley, Don Fagerquist, Don Shirley, Donn Trenner, Earl Zindars, Eartha Kitt, Eddie Cano, Elvin Jones, Ernie Andrews, Fats Sadi, Frank Traynor, Gene Quill, George Freeman, George Tucker, Gerry Mulligan, Guy Lafitte, Hank Marr, Horst Lippmann, Ian Christie, Ike Cole, J. R. Monterose, Jimmy Knepper, Jimmy Raney, Joe Castro, Joe Maneri, Joe Puma, John Dankworth, John Hubbard Beecher, John McLevy, John R. T. Davies, Johnny Maddox, Junior Collins, Lee Konitz, Lennie Hastings, Lucy Ann Polk, Luigi Waites, Malachi Favors, Marcel Azzola, Max Brüel, Mose Allison, Phil Cohran, Red Holloway, Red Mitchell, Red Rodney, René Thomas, Romano Mussolini, Ronnie Ball, Ronnie Scott, Ross McManus, Ruby Braff, Sal Mosca, Sam Butera, Shake Keane, Sonny Criss, Specs Wright, Stan Getz, Tom McIntosh, Tommy Turk, Tony Fruscella, Tony Kinsey, Victor Sproles, Walter Bishop Jr., Ward Swingle, Warne Marsh, and Wilton Gaynair.
- 1926 in jazz, births of Avo Uvezian, Bengt-Arne Wallin, Bernie Glow, Bill Henderson, Bill Smith, Billy Mitchell, Billy Usselton, Bob Flanigan, Bobby Jaspar, Bonnie Wetzel, Bucky Pizzarelli, Bud Shank, Buddy Arnold, Buddy Childers, Buddy Greco, Carlos Valdes, CeDell Davis, Charlie Biddle, Chris Anderson, Chuck Berry, Clarence Shaw, Claude Williamson, Curtis Counce, Cy Laurie, Dave Bailey, Dave Lee, Don Elliott, Don Rendell, Donna Hightower, Edmund Jenkins, Elek Bacsik, Ernie Henry, Franco Cerri, Frank Rehak, Frank Rosolino, George Masso, George Melly, Hal Russell, Herbie Jones, Herbie Steward, Hidehiko Matsumoto, Hitoshi Ueki, Jack Brokensha, Jack McDuff, Jackie Paris, Jeri Southern, Jim Caine, Jimmy "Jammin'" Smith, Jimmy Cleveland, Jimmy Gourley, Jimmy Heath, Jimmy Woode, Joe Houston, Joe Negri, John Coltrane, Johnny Coles, Johnny Windhurst, Julie London, Jymie Merritt, Kenny Hagood, Kristian Bergheim, Lou Bennett, Lou Donaldson, Melba Liston, Miles Davis, Milt Bernhart, Mimi Perrin, Monty Budwig, Nini Rosso, Nobuo Hara, Oscar Brown, Ove Lind, Phil Seamen, Pony Poindexter, Randi Hultin, Randy Weston, Ray Brown, Ray Copeland, Renato Sellani, Rick Fay, Riz Ortolani, Rob Swope, Roger Guérin, Ronnie Verrell, Russ Freeman, Sonny Bradshaw, Sonny Payne, Stan Barker, Stan Levey, Stan Reynolds, Stan Tracey, Tommy Whittle, Tony Bennett, Tony Terran, Urbie Green, Vlasta Průchová, Walt Harper, Whitney Balliett, Will Davis, and Willie Dennis.
- 1925 in jazz, deaths of Edna Hicks, Emmett Hardy, and Jimmy Palao; births of Al Cohn, Al Grey, Al Porcino, Alonzo Levister, Alvin Stoller, Alvin Tyler, Amru Sani, Art Pepper, B.B. King, Barbara Carroll, Benny Bailey, Bill Dixon, Billy Butler, Bob Cooper, Boogie Woogie Red, Bruno Martino, Cal Tjader, Carline Ray, Charlie Byrd, Chris Woods, Dave Pell, Dave Schildkraut, Dick Johnson, Dodo Marmarosa, Dom Um Romão, Don Lang, Earl Coleman, Eddie Harvey, Eddie Preston, Elliot Lawrence, Elmer Dresslar Jr., Emil Mangelsdorff, Errol Parker, Francisco Aguabella, Frank Holder, Frank Isola, Gene Ammons, George Morrow, George Wein, Gigi Gryce, Gunther Schuller, Hale Smith, Harold Ashby, Henri Renaud, James Moody, Jane Harvey, Janika Balázs, Jim Aton, Jimmy Bryant, Jimmy Nottingham, Jimmy Scott, Jiří Jirmal, Jørgen Ingmann, June Christy, Jutta Hipp, Kathy Stobart, Ken Moule, Kippie Moeketsi, Leo Parker, Leon Abramson, Mal Waldron, Marty Paich, Matthew Gee, Mel Tormé, Mickey Baker, Nat Peck, Nat Pierce, Nick Travis, Oscar Peterson, Phil Urso, Pia Beck, Roy Haynes, Russell Solomon, Sahib Shihab, Sam Woodyard, Sammy Davis Jr., Sherwood Johnson, Sonny Berman, Sonny Cohn, Sonny Parker, Teo Macero, Tommy Watt, Tony Crombie, Wallace Davenport, Zena Latto, and Zoot Sims.
- 1924 in jazz, death of Black Benny; births of Al Haig, Alice Babs, Armando Peraza, Arne Domnérus, Beryl Davis, Bill Perkins, Blossom Dearie, Bob Bain, Bobby Rosengarden, Brew Moore, Bruno Canfora, Bud Powell, Charlie Rouse, Chet Atkins, Chuck Higgins, Coco Schumann, Corky Corcoran, Denny Wright, Dick Buckley, Dick Cathcart, Dick Katz, Dick Marx, Dinah Kaye, Dinah Washington, Earl Palmer, Frances Wayne, Gary Chester, George Wallington, Gil Cuppini, Hal McKusick, Henry Mancini, Herbie Lovelle, J. J. Johnson, Jackie Paris, Jacky June, Jacques Pelzer, Jesse Drakes, Jimmy Cheatham, Jimmy Roberts, Jiří Šlitr, Joe Albany, Joya Sherrill, Kenny Dorham, Lammar Wright Jr., Louie Bellson, Lucky Thompson, Major Holley, Marshall Allen, Marty Flax, Mat Mathews, Max Roach, Nunzio Rotondo, Orlando DiGirolamo, Oscar Valdambrini, Paul Desmond, Pete Chilver, Pupo De Luca, Putte Wickman, Ray Wetzel, Rita Reys, Roger Williams, Rudy Pompilli, Rudy Van Gelder, Ruth Olay, Sam Jones, Sammy Nestico, Sarah Vaughan, Shorty Rogers, Shotaro Moriyasu, Sonny Stitt, Stewart "Dirk" Fischer, Teddy Edwards, Teddy Riley, Terry Gibbs, Tom Talbert, Vojislav Simic, and Wilbur Harden.
- 1923 in jazz, births of Aaron Sachs, Al Harewood, Alys Robi, Art Mardigan, Arvell Shaw, Barney Kessel, Bennie Green, Betty Glamann, Bill Douglass, Billy "Uke" Scott, Bjarne Nerem, Bob Bates, Bob Dorough, Bob Lively, Bobby Tucker, Buddy DeFranco, Charlie Mariano, Chris McGale, Chuck Wayne, Claude Luter, Dexter Gordon, Dill Jones, Don Abney, Don Banks, Don Butterfield, Don Lusher, Don Tosti, Ellis Larkins, Elmo Hope, Eugene Wright, Fats Navarro, Fausto Papetti, Frank Socolow, Fred Hunt, George Russell, Gunnar Hoffsten, Guy Warren, Helen Jones Woods, Herman Sherman, Idrees Sulieman, Ike Isaacs, Jack Parnell, Joe Kennedy Jr., Joe Shulman, Johnny Hartman, Josette Daydé, Ken Sykora, Kitty White, Lelio Luttazzi, Lenny Hambro, Linda Hayes, Lloyd Trotman, Lucille Dixon Robertson, Margie Hyams, Marky Markowitz, Mel Powell, Milt Jackson, Nora Brockstedt, Norma Zimmer, Osie Johnson, Pat Smythe, Paul Bacon, Paul Weeden, Percy Heath, Pete Candoli, Phil Nimmons, Philly Joe Jones, Ralph Sharon, Ray Ellis, Red Garland, Remo Palmier, Robert Graettinger, Sam Rivers, Serge Chaloff, Syd Lawrence, Talib Dawud, Thad Jones, Tiny Kahn, Tito Alberti, Tito Puente, Uffe Baadh, Wendell Eugene, Wes Montgomery, Wilbur Ware, Willie Cook, Willie Johnson, and Wyatt Ruther.
- 1922 in jazz, births of Aaron Bell, Åke Hasselgård, Al Hirt, Arv Garrison, Arvid Gram Paulsen, Beryl Booker, Big Miller, Big Nick Nicholas, Bob Carter, Bobby Donaldson, Bruce Turner, Bubba Brooks, Carmen McRae, Cecil Payne, Charles Mingus, Charles W. LaRue, Conrad Gozzo, Danny Bank, David "Buck" Wheat, David van Kriedt, Della Griffin, Dorothy Donegan, Duke Jordan, Earl Swope, Eddie "Lockjaw" Davis, Eddie Bert, Ernie Wilkins, Floyd "Candy" Johnson, Frank Wess, Geezil Minerve, Gerald Wiggins, Glauco Masetti, Gösta Theselius, Harry Betts, Illinois Jacquet, Jack Sels, Jack Sperling, Jaki Byard, James Buffington, Jimmy Wyble, Jiří Jelínek, Joe Morris, Joe Newman, Joe Wilder, John Carisi, Johnny Costa, Johnny Smith, Kai Winding, Karel Krautgartner, Kay Starr, King Fleming, King Pleasure, Larry Elgart, Lina Romay, Linda Vogt, Lorraine Gordon, Lou Blackburn, Lou Stein, Manny Albam, Martin Slavin, Monica Lewis, Mousey Alexander, Mundell Lowe, Neal Hefti, Oscar Pettiford, Page Cavanaugh, Paul Smith, Pauline Braddy, Ralph Burns, Ralph Sutton, Ray Anthony, Rolf Ericson, Sol Yaged, Specs Powell, Stan Hasselgård, Tale Ognenovski, Ted Nash, Terry Devon, Thelma Carpenter, Toots Thielemans, Virtue Hampton Whitted, and Von Freeman.
- 1921 in jazz, death of Tony Jackson; births of Al Hayse, Al Tinney, Alan Clare, André Hodeir, Astor Piazzolla, Bernie Leighton, Bill DeArango, Billy Taylor, Boomie Richman, Buddy Collette, Cab Kaye, Candido Camero, Chico Hamilton, Chico O'Farrill, Connie Haines, Dennis Berry, Earl Washington, Eddie Calhoun, Ernie Royal, Erroll Garner, Franny Beecher, Freddy Randall, Gene Roland, George Barnes, Gustav Brom, Harry Babasin, Herb Ellis, Hans Koller, Humphrey Lyttelton, Irv Kluger, Jack Marshall, Jimmy Coe, Jimmy Giuffre, Jimmy Henderson, Joe Loco, John Anderson, John Bunch, Jon Hendricks, Julius Watkins, Kenny Baker, Leon Breeden, Marty Napoleon, Mary Osborne, Monk Montgomery, Norman O'Connor, Norris Turney, Pat Friday, Preston Love, Roy Kral, Shifty Henry, Simon Brehm, Steve Allen, Tal Farlow, Tony Aless, Tony Jackson, Tony Scott, Vinnie Burke, Wardell Gray, Warren Covington, and Willy Andresen.
- 1920 in jazz, births of Al Caiola, Alan Davie, Alfred "Chico" Alvarez, Alfred Burt, Alfred "Chico" Alvarez, Art Van Damme, Bea Booze, Beryl Bryden, Bill Barber, Bob Enevoldsen, Bob Hames, Boris Vian, Britt Woodman, Buzzy Drootin, Carl-Henrik Norin, Charlie Shavers, Charlie Norman, Charlie Parker, Clark Terry, Dave Brubeck, Don Lamond, Eddie Johnson, Elizete Cardoso, Gene Leis, George Duvivier, George Handy, Gil Fuller, Ginger Smock, Géo Voumard, Hall Overton, Harry Arnold, Hazel Scott, Helmut Zacharias, Herbie Harper, Hubert Giraud, Irving Ashby, Jack Lesberg, Jerome Richardson, Jimmy Forrest, Jimmy Witherspoon, Joe Mondragon, John LaPorta, John Lewis, José Melis, Kay Davis, Ken Nordine, Ken Rattenbury, Kurt Edelhagen, Lennie Felix, Leonard Gaskin, Marshall Brown, Paul Gonsalves, Peggy Lee, Ray Abrams, Ray Linn, Roland Shaw, Rowland Greenberg, Sam Ranelli, Sam Ulano, Shelly Manne, Stan Freeman, Tommy Pederson, Wendell Marshall, and Yusef Lateef.

== 1910s ==
- 1919 in jazz, deaths of James Reese Europe, Henry Ford, and Henry Ragas; births of Al McKibbon, Al Viola, Anita O'Day, Arnold Fishkind, Art Blakey, Babs Gonzales, Barry Galbraith, Benny Harris, Bernard Anderson, Bill Jennings, Booty Wood, Buddy Morrow, Calvin Jackson, Don Cornell, Flavio Ambrosetti, Ella Johnson, Erwin Lehn, Fred Lange-Nielsen, George Shearing, Georgie Auld, Hal Singer, Henry Coker, Herbie Fields, Herbie Nichols, Herman Fowlkes, Jr., Ike Isaacs, Israel Crosby, Jack Costanzo, Jim Chapin, Joe Benjamin, Joe Carroll, Joe McQueen, John Malachi, Johnny Bothwell, Johnny Desmond, Kenny Trimble, Lennie Tristano, Lil Green, Luther Henderson, Mary Ann McCall, Mercer Ellington, Moultrie Patten, Nat King Cole, Peck Morrison, Peggy Mann, Pete Seeger, Randy Brooks, Reinhold Svensson, Sadik Hakim, Shadow Wilson, Snooky Young, Steve Jordan, Thore Swanerud, Tío Tom, and Vic Lewis.
- 1918 in jazz, births of Aaron Bridgers, Andy Hamilton, Arnett Cobb, Bebo Valdés, Betty Roché, Bill Graham, Bobby Byrne, Bobby Troup, Butch Ballard, Cachao López, Charles Thompson, Chubby Jackson, Dal Richards, Dave Bartholomew, Eddie Jefferson, Eddie Safranski, Eraldo Volonté, Freddie Kohlman, George Desmond Hodnett, Gerald Wilson, Hank Jones, Howard McGhee, Hubert Rostaing, Ike Quebec, Irene Daye, Irene Higginbotham, Jimmy Blanton, Jimmy Jones, Jimmy Rowles, Joan C. Edwards, Joe Williams, John Simmons, Kjeld Bonfils, Knocky Parker, Louise Tobin, Marian McPartland, Mariano Mores, Milton DeLugg, Money Johnson, Nat Jaffe, Panama Francis, Peanuts Hucko, Pearl Bailey, Phil Moore, Rusty Dedrick, Sam Donahue, Sammy Lowe, Tommy Potter, Tony Mottola, Verne Byers, Waldren Joseph, and Wild Bill Davis.
- 1917 in jazz, death of Scott Joplin; births of Aimé Barelli, Armando Trovajoli, Avery Parrish, Bea Wain, Bill Finegan, Billie Rogers, Billy Butterfield, Billy Maxted, Boots Mussulli, Buddy Rich, Buster Harding, Charlie Munro, Charlie Shavers, Curley Russell, Dalva de Oliveira, Dardanelle Hadley, Dave Lambert, Dean Martin, Denzil Best, Dizzy Gillespie, Eddie Vinson, Ella Fitzgerald, Floyd Smith, Frankie Lee Sims, Fred Beckett, Garnet Clark, Helen Forrest, Henri Salvador, Howard Rumsey, J. C. Heard, Jerry Wexler, Jimmy Butts, Jimmy Hamilton, Jimmy Maxwell, Joe Comfort, Joe Dixon, John Adriano Acea, John Benson Brooks, John Graas, Johnny Guarnieri, Johnny Letman, Junior Raglin, Laurindo Almeida, Lena Horne, Les Elgart, Lou McGarity, Max Jones, Mike Pedicin, Mongo Santamaría, Morty Corb, Mose Vinson, Nelson Williams, Pat Flowers, Pud Brown, Russell Jacquet, Sandy Block, Shep Shepherd, Si Zentner, Sonny White, Streamline Ewing, Sylvia Syms, Tadd Dameron, and Thelonious Monk.
- 1916 in jazz, births of Al Killian, Al Lucas, Artie Shapiro, Benny Moten, Bill Doggett, Bill Harris, Bill Stegmeyer, Billy May, Bob Scobey, Dud Bascomb, Buddy Cole, Burt Bales, Cat Anderson, Charles Fowlkes, Charlie Christian, Cliff Townshend, Dick Cary, Don Ewell, Dud Bascomb, Edythe Wright, Freddie Webster, George Fierstone, Hadda Brooks, Harry James, Horacio Salgán, Hugh Gibb, Jake Porter, Jay McShann, Jimmy Skidmore, Joe Bushkin, Joe Springer, John Mehegan, Johnny Frigo, Julian Dash, Kamil Běhounek, Ken Kersey, Lance Hayward, Maurice Purtill (Moe Purtill), Max Geldray, Maxwell Davis, Mike Bryan, Miles Copeland, Jr., Milt Raskin, Milton Babbitt, Moon Mullens, Moondog, Norman Keenan, Oleg Lundstrem, Oliver Todd, Oscar Moore, Paul Moer, Paul Quinichette, Ray Ellington, Red Callender, Robert Normann, Russell Garcia, Sam Taylor, Skip Martin, Slim Gaillard, Svend Asmussen, Teddy Brannon, Tiny Grimes, Trigger Alpert, and Yehudi Menuhin.
- 1915 in jazz, births of Al Casey, Al Hall, Al Hibbler, Allan Reuss, Bill Miller, Billie Holiday, Billy Bauer, Billy Strayhorn, Bobby Hackett, Boots Mussulli, Buddy Johnson, Cee Pee Johnson, Chano Pozo, Chino Pozo, Dick Vance, Doc West, Donald Mills, Earl Wild, Eddie Heywood, Emmett Berry, Flip Phillips, Frances Klein, Frank Sinatra, George Chisholm, George Kelly, Graciela, Gus Bivona, Gus Viseur, Hank D'Amico, Harry Gibson, Henry Adler, Herbie Haymer, Irving Fields, Jane Jarvis, John Serry Sr., Julian Gould, Kansas Fields, Keg Purnell, Lee Castle, Les Paul, Linton Garner, Marlowe Morris, Martha Tilton, Midge Williams, Milt Buckner, Morey Feld, Murray Kane, Murray McEachern, Nick Fatool, Ray Perry, Scoops Carry, Shorty Sherock, Sweets Edison, Taft Jordan, Turk Murphy, Una Mae Carlisle, Van Alexander, Vernon Alley, Vi Burnside, Willie Dixon, Wynonie Harris, and Zeke Zarchy.
- 1914 in jazz, births of Billy Eckstine, Bob Haggart, Carl Barriteau, Carlos Vidal Bolado, Cecil Brower, Corky Cornelius, Dave Bowman, Dave Wilkins, Earle Warren, Erskine Hawkins, Graeme Bell, Hal McIntyre, Irmgard Österwall, Josef Taussig, Lee Young, Lem Davis, Kenny Clarke, King Perry, Larry Adler, Leonard Feather, Marvin Ash, Ralph Flanagan, Ray Leatherwood, Roberto Nicolosi, Rudy Bruder, Shizuko Kasagi, Shorty Baker, Sing Miller, Skeeter Best, Slam Stewart, Sonny Burke, Sun Ra, Tommy McQuater, Tommy Stevenson, and Ziggy Elman.
- 1913 in jazz, births of Adele Girard, Alfred Gallodoro, Anna Mae Winburn, Blind John Davis, Blue Barron, Blue Lu Barker, Bob Crosby, Boyd Raeburn, Buddy Tate, Candy Candido, Charlie Barnet, Cliff Leeman, Cosimo Di Ceglie, Don Stovall, Dorothy Sloop, Earl Bostic, Etta Baker, George Van Eps, Gene Ramey, Gus Clark, Gus Johnson, Harry Lookofsky, Helen Humes, Helen Ward, Herb Jeffries, Jack Bentley, John Collins, Milton Adolphus, Nat Temple, Pannonica de Koenigswarter, Ralph Ellison, Ray Nance, Rozelle Claxton, Singleton Palmer, Smiley Lewis, Stanley Black, Ted Buckner, Thore Jederby, Vido Musso, Vinicius de Moraes, Wally Rose, and Woody Herman.
- 1912 in jazz, births of Al Lucas, Alix Combelle, Alvin Alcorn, Anne Lenner, Anselmo Sacasas, Asser Fagerström, Beverly Peer, Bill Johnson, Bob Zurke, Clarence Profit, Dave Barbour, Don Byas, Erhard Bauschke, Ernst Höllerhagen, Franz Jackson, Fritz Schulz-Reichel, George T. Simon, Gil Evans, Gösta Törner, Harry Parry, Irving Fazola, Jean Omer, Jiří Traxler, John Levy, Johnny Mince, Joseph Reinhardt, Léo Marjane, Les Brown, Marshal Royal, Nellie Lutcher, Paloma Efron, Paul Bascomb, Paul Weston, Red Richards, Red Saunders, Svein Øvergaard, Ted Donnelly, Teddy Wilson, Thore Ehrling, Trummy Young, and Will Bradley.
- 1911 in jazz, births of Aldo Rossi, Alton Purnell, Alvin Burroughs, Big Joe Turner, Billy Amstell, Billy Munn, Buck Clayton, Cag Cagnolatti, Charles Redland, Clare Deniz, Cootie Williams, Ernie Caceres, Frank Weir, Freddie Green, George Clarke, Harper Goff, Jo Jones, John G. Blowers Jr., Johnny Blowers, Karel Vlach, Lionel Ferbos, Lodewijk Parisius, Louis Cottrell Jr., Lu Watters, Mahalia Jackson, Mario Bauza, Max Miller, Maxine Sullivan, Norma Teagarden, Pete Clarke, Robert Johnson, Roy Eldridge, Spike Jones, Stan Kenton, Truck Parham, Tullio Mobiglia, and Zilas Görling.
- 1910 in jazz, births of Al Sears, Arthur Österwall, Artie Shaw, Boyce Brown, Budd Johnson, Charlie Holmes, Django Reinhardt, Eddie Beal, Everett Barksdale, Freddie Slack, Freddy Gardner, Gene Porter, Harry Carney, Jack Jenney, Jimmy Crawford, Lou Busch, Louis Prima, Lucky Millinder, Mary Lou Williams, Milt Larkin, Minoru Matsuya, Pha Terrell, Ray McKinley, Rupert Nurse, Shep Fields, Sid Catlett, Stan Wrightsman, Stella Brooks, Sy Oliver, T-Bone Walker, and Willie Smith.

== 1900s ==
- 1909 in jazz, births of Art Tatum, Artie Bernstein, Ben Webster, Benny Goodman, Booker Pittman, Buddy Featherstonhaugh, Cassino Simpson, Cedric Wallace, Claude Thornhill, Cozy Cole, Danny Barker, Dick Stabile, Ed Burke, Eddie Barefield, Garland Wilson, Gene Krupa, Gus Deloof, Henry Nemo, Herschel Evans, Jacques Butler, Jonah Jones, Larry Clinton, Leon Washington, Lester Young, Miff Görling, Mouse Randolph, Narvin Kimball, O'Neill Spencer, Oscar Alemán, Pippo Starnazza, Roger Chaput, Rudy Williams, Rupert Cole, Scoville Browne, Stuff Smith, Tab Smith, Teddy Buckner, Teddy Bunn, Teddy Hill, Tiny Davis, Tiny Winters, and Wilbert Baranco.
- 1908 in jazz, births of Alfred Lion, Bill Beason, Bill Tapia, Billy Banks, Bunny Berigan, Charlie Beal, Chu Berry, Clancy Hayes, Don Albert, Elmer Crumbley, Ernst van 't Hoff, Fred Adison, Fud Candrix, Håkan von Eichwald, Harlan Lattimore, Herman Chittison, Hot Lips Page, Jean Robert, John Kirby, Keg Johnson, Kid Howard, Kid Sheik, Lee Wiley, Lionel Hampton, Louis Jordan, Max Kaminsky, Nat Gonella, Ray Ventura, Raymond Scott, Red Allen, Red Norvo, Russ Columbo, Russell Procope, Sammy Price, Seymour Österwall, Spencer Clark, Spike Hughes, Stéphane Grappelli, Teddy McRae, Willie Bryant, and Zinky Cohn.
- 1907 in jazz, births of Al Rinker, Albert Ammons, André Ekyan, Benny Carter, Benny Morton, Cab Calloway, Casper Reardon, Castor McCord, Connee Boswell, Dave Tough, Dicky Wells, Ernest "Doc" Paulin, Fernando Arbello, Frank Melrose, Fulton McGrath, Gene Sedric, Harry Gold, Hayes Alvis, Herb Hall, Jan Savitt, Jane Froman, Joe Haymes, Joe Marsala, Joe Turner, Lawrence Brown, Leon Prima, Moses Allen, Olivia Plunket Greene, Rex Stewart, Rod Cless, Roger Wolfe Kahn, Roy Milton, Ryoichi Hattori, Sid Phillips, Skinnay Ennis, Snoozer Quinn, Tiny Bradshaw, and Tony Pastor.
- 1906 in jazz, births of Alex Hill, Barney Bigard, Billy Taylor Sr., Bobby Stark, Cuba Austin, Eddie Durham, Edward Inge, Edwin Swayze, Fats Pichon, Frankie Newton, Frank Teschemacher, Fud Livingston, Fulton McGrath, Josephine Baker, Glen Gray, Guy Kelly, Hayes Pillars, Jaroslav Ježek, Joe Darensbourg, Johnny Hodges, Kai Ewans, Leo Mathisen, Leon "Pee Wee" Whittaker, Little Brother Montgomery, Pee Wee Russell, Pete Brown, Ray Bauduc, René Compère, Robert De Kers, Sterling Bose, Vic Dickenson, Victoria Spivey, and Ward Pinkett.
- 1905 in jazz, births of Alphonse Trent, Ann Ronell, Arthur Whetsel, Bernard Addison, Cecil Scott, Chelsea Quealey, Chick Webb, Doc Cheatham, Don Kirkpatrick, Eddie Condon, Fernand Coppieters, Georgie Stoll, Harry Barris, Herb Morand, Ivie Anderson, Jack Teagarden, Jan Werich, Lebert Lombardo, Martha Boswell, Percy Humphrey, Reuben Reeves, Richard McPartland, Snub Mosley, Tamara Drasin, Tommy Benford, Tommy Dorsey, and Walter Barnes.
- 1904 in jazz, births of Arne Hülphers, Art Hodes, Arthur Rosebery, Bill Coleman, Buster Smith, Charles Rogers, Cie Frazier, Coleman Hawkins, Count Basie, David Plunket Greene, Dick McDonough, Don Murray, Donald Lambert, Eddie South, Fats Waller, Floyd Bean, Freddy Johnson, George Formby, Geraldo, Glenn Miller, Greely Walton, Hal Kemp, Herman Autrey, Jess Stacy, Jimmy Dorsey, Juice Wilson, Leo Adde, Nisse Lind, Otto Hardwick, Pete Johnson, Peter Packay, Peter van Steeden, Pinetop Smith, Phil Harris, Raymond Burke, Russ Morgan, Sharkey Bonano, Stan Brenders, Stump Evans, Tricky Sam Nanton, and Valaida Snow.
- 1903 in jazz, births of Adrian Rollini, Big Joe Williams, Bix Beiderbecke, Brad Gowans, Chas Remue, Claude Hopkins, Clyde McCoy, Earl Hines, Einar Aaron Swan, Emmett Hardy, Frankie Carle, Happy Caldwell, Jack Gardner, James "Bubber" Miley, Joe Garland, Joe Venuti, John Ouwerx, June Cole, Lee Blair, Mildred Bailey, Min Leibrook, Monk Hazel, Ray Noble, Spiegle Willcox, and Teddy Weatherford.
- 1902 in jazz, births of Artemi Ayvazyan, Barney Josephson, Benny Waters, Buster Bailey, Cecil Irwin, Chauncey Morehouse, Chris Columbus, Cliff Jackson, Danny Alvin, Ed Cuffee, Eddie Lang, Erik Tuxen, Georg Malmstén, George Brunies, Jim McCartney, Jimmie Lunceford, Jimmy Archey, Leon Roppolo, Lloyd Scott, Louis Barbarin, Louis Nelson, Mel Stitzel, Omer Simeon, Preston Jackson, Putney Dandridge, Rosy McHargue, Rube Bloom, Shirley Clay, and Ted Heath.
- 1901 in jazz, births of Adelaide Hall, Annette Hanshaw, Charlie Burse, Claude Jones, Danny Polo, Edmond Hall, Enrique Santos Discépolo, Frankie Trumbauer, Jesse Stone, Jimmy Blythe, Jimmy Rushing, Lee Collins, Lou Black, Louis Armstrong, Muggsy Spanier, Phil Napoleon, Polo Barnes, Richard Plunket Greene, Sidney Arodin, and Thelma Terry.
- 1900 in jazz, births of Arthur Herzog Jr., Barney Rapp, Chester Zardis, Cyril Blake, Don Redman, Elmer Snowden, George Lewis, Jimmy Bertrand, Jimmy Harrison, Joe Appleton, Juan d'Arienzo, Juan Tizol, June Clark, Lawrence Marrero, Mabel Mercer, Paul Mares, Peter DeRose, Poley McClintock, Tiny Parham, Tommy Ladnier, Virginia Liston, Walter Page, Wilbur de Paris, Willie Humphrey, Wilton Crawley, Wingy Manone, and Xavier Cugat.

== Pre-1900s ==
- 1899, births of Big Boy Goudie, Billy Cotton, Charlie Irvis, Duke Ellington, Eddie Pollack, Harry Shields, Hoagy Carmichael, Jack Bland, Johnny Bayersdorffer, Kaiser Marshall, Lonnie Johnson, Mezz Mezzrow, Mitja Nikisch, Paul Barbarin, Red McKenzie, and Thomas A. Dorsey.
- 1898, births of Alex Hyde, Baby Dodds, Bernard Etté, Charlie Dixon, Clarence Williams, Fred Rich, George Gershwin, Gregor, Henry Ford, Herb Flemming, Jay Wilbur, Kid Rena, Leo Watson, Lil Hardin Armstrong, Miff Mole, Miklós Vig, R.Q. Dickerson, Ralph Escudero, Theodore Carpenter, and Zutty Singleton.
- 1897, births of Buddie Petit, Buster Wilson, Ed Allen, Fletcher Henderson, He Dasha, Isaiah Morgan, Lee Morse, Minor Hall, Sidney Bechet, Sweet Emma Barrett, and Willie "The Lion" Smith.
- 1896, births of Amanda Randolph, Bert Ambrose, Elmer Schoebel, Eric Vogel, Florence Mills, George E. Lee, Jimmy O'Bryant, Joe Sanders, Mike Mosiello, Reverend Gary Davis, Seymour Simons, Steve Lewis, and Vic Berton.
- 1895, births of Alberta Hunter, Andy Razaf, August Agbola O'Browne, Carroll Dickerson, Darnell Howard, Ed Garland, Edna Hicks, Emile Christian, Ernesto Lecuona, Irving Aaronson, Jimmie Noone, Leonid Utyosov, Lizzie Miles, Paul Howard, Sam Morgan, Sam Wooding, Sonny Greer, Tubby Hall, and Yank Porter.
- 1894, births of Bennie Moten, Bessie Smith, Cow Cow Davenport, Dol Dauber, Edmund Jenkins, Fess Williams, Henry Busse, Honoré Dutrey, Irving Mills, James P. Johnson, and Vaughn De Leath.
- 1893, births of Austin Wylie, Blind Lemon Jefferson, Charlie Green, Jean Goldkette, Larry Shields, Mal Hallett, Perry Bradford, and Sidney Desvigne.
- 1892, births of Dink Johnson, Emile Barnes, Ferde Grofé, Jack Hylton, Johnny Dodds, Richard M. Jones, Roy Palmer, and Valdemar Eiberg.
- 1891, births of Ben Bernie, Charley Straight, Charlie Creath, Charlie Johnson, Cole Porter, Doc Cook, Eddie Edwards, Henry Ragas, Mutt Carey, Noah Lewis, Porter Grainger, Valentin Parnakh, Wellman Braud, and Zue Robertson.
- 1890, births of Bessie Brown, Bud Scott, Charlie Creath, Chris Kelly, Eddie Anthony, Fate Marable, Gene Rodemich, Jelly Roll Morton, Johnny St. Cyr, Paul Whiteman, Phil Spitalny, Steve Brown, and Virginia Liston.
- 1889, births of Amos White, Dave Peyton, Freddie Keppard, Jack Carey, Louis Douglas, Manuel Manetta, Nick LaRocca, and Spencer Williams.
- 1888, births of Alcide Pavageau, Armand J. Piron, Curtis Mosby, Francisco Canaro, Ida Cox, and Tom Brown.
- 1887, births of Cripple Clarence Lofton, Eubie Blake, Lovie Austin, Luckey Roberts, and Ragbaby Stephens.
- 1886, births of Al Jolson, and Kid Ory.
- 1885, births of Achille Baquet, Adrian Rollini, Joe "King" Oliver, Louis Mitchell, Lou Gold, and Louis Nelson Delisle.
- 1884, births of Alcide Nunez, Naftule Brandwein, and Papa Celestin.
- 1883, births of Mamie Smith, and Wooden Joe Nicholas.
- 1882, births of Ma Rainey, Tony Jackson, and Wilber Sweatman.
- 1881, births of George Baquet, James Tim Brymn, and John Spikes.
- 1880, birth of James Reese Europe.
- 1879, births of Bunk Johnson, Jimmy Palao, and Julius Foss.
- 1878, births of Alphonse Picou, and Louis Cottrell, Sr.
- 1877, birth of Buddy Bolden.
- 1875, births of Mike Bernard, and Willie Cornish.
- 1873, births of Joseph Petit, and W. C. Handy.
- 1872, birth of Bill Johnson.
- 1871, births of Isidore Barbarin, and Manuel Perez.
- 1868, births of Scott Joplin, and William Krell.
- 1866, birth of John Robichaux.
