= 1978 in jazz =

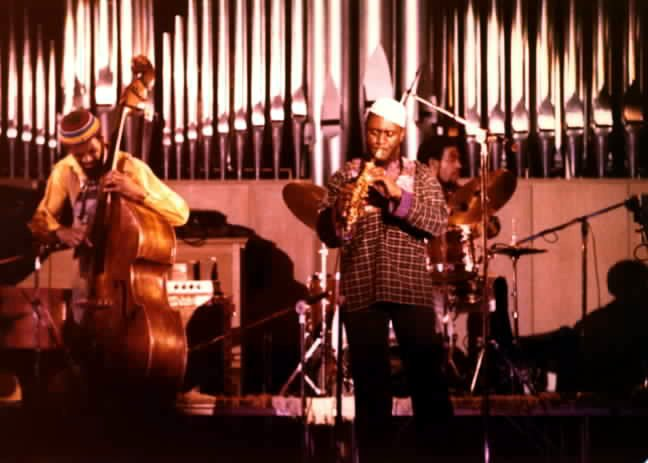
- Pharoah Sanders, Reggie Workman, and unidentified drummer, c. 1978
- Decade: 1970s in jazz
- Music: 1978 in music
- Standards: List of post-1950 jazz standards
- See also: 1977 in jazz – 1979 in jazz

This is a timeline documenting events of Jazz in the year 1978.

== Events ==
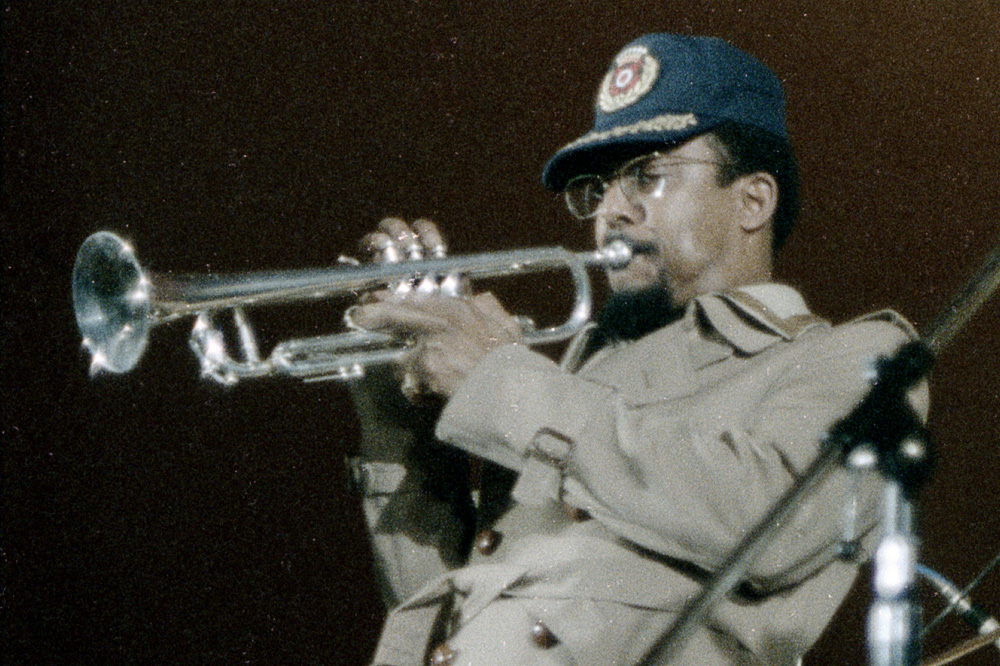
Lester Bowie at moers festival 1978.

=== March ===
- 17 – The 5th Vossajazz started in Vossavangen, Norway (March 17–19).

=== May ===
- 12 – The 7th Moers Festival started in Moers, Germany (May 12–15).
- 24 – The 6th Nattjazz started in Bergen, Norway (May 24 – June 7).

=== July ===
- 1 – The 25th Newport Jazz Festival started in Newport, Rhode Island (July 1–3).
- 7 – The 12th Montreux Jazz Festival started in Montreux, Switzerland (July 7–23).
- 14 – The 3rd North Sea Jazz Festival started in The Hague, Netherlands (July 14–16).
- 28 – The very first Jazz in Marciac started in Marciac, France (July 28 – August 17).

=== September ===
- 15 – The 21st Monterey Jazz Festival started in Monterey, California (September 15 – 17).

== Album releases ==
- Chick Corea: The Mad Hatter
- Chick Corea: Secret Agent
- Chick Corea: Friends
- Air: Open Air Suit
- Herb Alpert and Hugh Masekela: Herb Alpert / Hugh Masekela
- Herb Alpert and Hugh Masekela: Main Event Live
- Fred Anderson: Another Place
- Art Ensemble of Chicago: Nice Guys
- Kenny Barron: Innocence
- Carla Bley: Musique Mecanique
- Arthur Blythe: Bush Baby
- Arthur Blythe: Lenox Avenue Breakdown
- Lester Bowie: African Children
- Anthony Braxton: For Four Orchestras
- Andrew Cyrille: Metamusicians' Stomp
- Anthony Davis: Of Blues and Dream
- Al Di Meola: Casino
- Joe Farrell: Night Dancing
- Michael Franks: Burchfield Nines
- Chico Freeman: The Outside Within
- Ganelin Trio: Concerto Grosso
- Egberto Gismonti: Solo
- Guenter Hampel: Freedom Of The Universe
- Guenter Hampel: Oasis
- Gerry Hemingway: Kwambe
- Ernie Krivda: The Alchemist
- Leroy Jenkins: The Legend of Ai Glatson
- Quincy Jones: Sounds...and Stuff Like That!!
- John Klemmer: Arabesque
- Oliver Lake: Life Dance of Is
- George Lewis: The Imaginary Suite
- David Liebman: Pendulum
- Chuck Mangione: Feels So Good
- John McLaughlin: Electric Guitarist
- Misha Mengelberg: Pech Onderweg
- Pat Metheny: Pat Metheny Group (album)
- Roscoe Mitchell: L-R-G / The Maze / S II Examples
- John Oswald: Improvised
- Evan Parker: Monoceros
- Marvin Peterson: The Light
- Jean-Luc Ponty: Cosmic Messenger
- Don Pullen: Warriors
- Dewey Redman: Soundsigns
- Sam Rivers: Waves
- Max Roach & Anthony Braxton: Birth and Rebirth
- Rova Saxophone Quartet: Cinema Rovate
- Leo Smith: The Mass on the World
- Peter Sprague: Dance of the Universe
- Spyro Gyra: Spyro Gyra
- Sun Ra: Lanquidity
- Cecil Taylor: 3 Phasis
- Cecil Taylor: Cecil Taylor Unit
- Ralph Towner: Batik
- James Blood Ulmer: Tales of Captain Black
- Weather Report: Mr. Gone
- Paul Winter: Common Ground
- World Saxophone Quartet: Steppin' with the World Saxophone Quartet

== Deaths ==
January

- 23 – Terry Kath, American guitarist and vocalist (unintentional self-inflicted gunshot), Chicago (born 1946).
- 31 – Gregory Herbert, American saxophonist and flautist, Blood, Sweat & Tears (born 1947).

February

- 26
  - Frances Wayne, American vocalist (born 1924).
  - Alix Combelle, French tenor saxophonist, clarinetist, and bandleader (born 1912).

March

- 4 – Joe Marsala, Italian-American clarinetist and songwriter (born 1907).
- 21 – Louis Cottrell Jr., American clarinetist and tenor saxophonist (born 1911).
- 25 – Richard Plunket Greene, English musician and author, Bright Young Things (born 1901).
- 30 – Larry Young, American organist and occasional pianist (born 1940).

April

- 3 – Ray Noble, English bandleader, composer, arranger, radio comedian, and actor (born 1903).

May

- 19 – Teddy Hill, American big band leader and multi-instrumentalist (born 1909).
- 28
  - Marlowe Morris, American jazz pianist and organist (born 1915).
  - Money Johnson, American jazz trumpeter (born 1918).

June

- Bud Brisbois, American trumpeter (born 1937).

July

- 4 – Arne Hülphers, Swedish pianist and bandleader (born 1904).
- 14 – Lennie Hastings, English drummer (born 1927).
- 20 – Teddy Bunn, American guitarist, Spirits of Rhythm (born 1909).

August

- 14 – Joe Venuti, Italian-American jazz violinist (born 1903).
- 15 – Irene Kral, American jazz singer (born 1932).
- 24 – Louis Prima, Italian-American singer, songwriter, bandleader, and trumpeter (born 1910).

September

- 9 – Kaoru Abe, Japanese avant-garde alto saxophonist (born 1949).
- 30 – Beryl Booker, American pianist (born 1922).

November

- 16 – Jimmy Nottingham, American jazz trumpeter (born 1925).
- 18 – Lennie Tristano, American pianist, composer, and arranger (born 1919).
- 26 – Frank Rosolino, American trombonist (born 1926).

December

- 17 – Don Ellis, American big-bandleader, trumpeter, composer, arranger, and film composer (born 1934).
- 29 – Happy Caldwell, American clarinetist and tenor saxophonist (born 1903).

Unknown date

- Bill Jennings, American guitarist and composer (born 1919).

== Births ==
January

- 3 – Susana Santos Silva, Portuguese trumpeter, flugelhornist, and flautist.
- 9 – China Moses, American singer.
- 10
  - Kekko Fornarelli, Italian pianist and composer.
  - Soweto Kinch, British saxophonist.

February

- 9 – Clarice Assad, Brazilian-American composer, pianist, and singer.
- 12 – Masayuki Hiizumi, Japanese keyboardist and producer.
- 14 – Cem Tuncer, Turkish guitarist, composer, arranger, and producer.

March

- 5 – Søren Kjærgaard, Danish pianist, composer, and bandleader.
- 18 – Videlina Mircheva, Bulgarian singer and songwriter.
- 24 – Andrew McCormack, British pianist.

April

- 6 – Robert Glasper, American pianist and record producer.
- 11 – Jakob Bro, Danish guitarist.
- 15 – Susanne Alt, Dutch saxophonist and composer.

May

- 7 – Antal Pusztai, Hungarian guitarist.
- 10 – Nils Janson, Swedish composer and trumpeter.
- 25 – Michael Wollny, German pianist.
- 29 – Sean Jones, American trumpeter and composer.

June

- 10 – Jukka Eskola, Finnish trumpeter and flugelhornist.

August

- 6 – Andreas Öberg, Swedish guitarist, songwriter, and music producer.
- 12 – Chris Jennings, Canadian upright bassist, composer, arranger, and educator.
- 27 – Susy Kane, English actress, comedy writer and musician.
- 31
  - Morten Qvenild, Norwegian jazz pianist, band leader and producer, Susanna and the Magical Orchestra.
  - Tineke Postma, Dutch saxophonist.

June

- 17 – Esben Selvig, Norwegian rapper and singer.

September

- 2 – Jonas Kullhammar, Swedish composer and saxophonist.
- 16
  - Ane Carmen Roggen, Norwegian singer, conductor, and arranger, Pitsj.
  - Ida Roggen, Norwegian singer, Pitsj.
- 23 – Valtteri Laurell Pöyhönen, Finnish guitarist, pianist, composer, bandleader and producer.
- 29 – Luca Gianquitto, Italian guitarist and composer.

October

- 5 – Steinar Nickelsen, Norwegian Hammond organist, pianist, and composer.
- 8 – Mike Moreno, American guitarist and composer.
- 12 – Børge-Are Halvorsen, Norwegian saxophonist and flautist.
- 16 – Eva Kruse, German upright bassist and composer.

November

- 1 – Rozina Pátkai, Hungarian singer, songwriter, and visual artist.
- 3 – Jonas Howden Sjøvaag, Norwegian jazz drummer.
- 5 – Marita Røstad, Norwegian singer-songwriter.
- 9 – Even Ormestad, Norwegian bass guitarist and music producer, Jaga Jazzist.
- 19
  - Matt Dusk, Canadian vocalist.
  - Janek Gwizdala, English bassist.

December

- 28 – Terrace Martin, American saxophonist and producer.
- 30
  - Daniel Heløy Davidsen, Danish-Norwegian guitarist.
  - Julie Dahle Aagård, Norwegian vocalist, composer, and band leader.

Unknown date

- Marc Demuth, Luxembourgian upright bassist, bass guitarist, and composer.
- Mikkel Ploug, Danish guitarist and composer.
- Niels Klein, German saxophonist, clarinetist, and composer.
- Robi Botos, Hungarian-Canadian pianist and composer.

== See also ==
- 1970s in jazz
- List of years in jazz
- 1978 in music
