= 1903 in jazz =

- Decade: Pre-1920 in jazz
- Music: 1903 in music
- Standards: List of pre-1920 jazz standards
- See also: 1902 in jazz – 1904 in jazz

This is a timeline documenting events of Jazz in the year 1903.

== Events ==
- Sidney Bechet borrows his brother's clarinet, and the result is well known.

== Births ==
January

- 18 – Min Leibrook, American tubist and bassist (died 1943).

February

- 27 – Mildred Bailey, American singer (died 1951).

March

- 8 – John Ouwerx, Belgian pianist and composer (died 1983).
- 10 – Bix Beiderbecke, American cornetist, pianist, and composer (died 1931).
- 20 – Einar Aaron Swan, American violinist, clarinetist, saxophonist, pianist, arranger, and composer (died 1940).
- 25 – Frankie Carle, American pianist and bandleader (died 2001).

April

- 3 – James "Bubber" Miley, American trumpetist and cornetist (died 1932).

May

- 2 – Spiegle Willcox, American trombonist (died 1999).

June

- 3 – Josephine Baker, French singer, entertainer, activist, and Resistance agent (died 1975).
- 12 – Emmett Hardy, American cornetist (died 1925).
- 28 – Adrian Rollini, American bass saxophonist, pianist, vibraphonist, and multi-instrumentalist (died 1956).

July

- 25 – Happy Caldwell, American clarinetist and tenor saxophonist (died 1978).

August

- 14 – Jack Gardner, American pianist (died 1957).
- 15
  - Joe Garland, American saxophonist, composer, and arranger, "In the Mood" (died 1977).
  - Monk Hazel, American drummer (died 1968).
- 24 – Claude Hopkins, American stride pianist and bandleader (died 1984).

September

- 16 – Joe Venuti, Italian-American violinist (died 1978).

October

- 10 – Lee Blair, American banjoist and guitarist (died 1966).
- 11 – Teddy Weatherford, American pianist and an accomplished stride pianist (died 1945).
- 15 – Chas Remue, Belgian reedist (died 1971).
- 16 – Big Joe Williams, American guitarist, singer, and songwriter (died 1982).

December

- 3 – Brad Gowans, American trombonist and reedist (died 1954).
- 17 – Ray Noble, English bandleader, composer, arranger, radio comedian, and actor (died 1978).
- 28 – Earl Hines, American pianist and bandleader (died 1983).
- 29 – Clyde McCoy, American trumpeter (died 1990).

Unknown date

- June Cole, American bassist, tubist, and singer (died 1960).
