= X-Faktor series 9 =

Season of Hungarian reality television show

X-Faktor
- Series 9
- Hosted by: Ramóna Kiss
- Judges: Laci Gáspár; Peti Puskás; Bogi Dallos; ByeAlex
- Winner: Tibor Ruszó
- Winning mentor: ByeAlex
- Runner-up: Andor Vanek

Release
- Original network: RTL Klub
- Original release: 5 October – 14 December 2019

Series chronology
- ← Previous; Series 8

X-Faktor is a Hungarian television music competition to find new singing talent. Kiss Ramona presented her third series of X-Faktor. The ninth series aired on RTL Klub in 2019. ByeAlex, Laci Gáspár, Peti Puskás remained in the jury in the 9th season. After 2 years Gigi Radics, left X-Faktor, and was replaced by Bogi Dallos. Tibor Ruszó won the competition, in the boys category.

== Auditions ==
Open auditions took place in Budapest in March 2019. The judges' auditions started in July.

== Judges' houses ==
This year there were no guest speakers, but every mentor would hear the performances of the four categories, then the mentor of that category would automatically bring two contestants to the live broadcasts and the remaining contestants would be assigned to the other three mentors who would select the third lead.

The twelve eliminated acts were:

- Boys: Ferenc Bottka Dominik, Alfréd Hadas, Kristóf Markovics
- Girls: Zita Antal Melánia, Eszter Bojás, Cintia Ács
- Over 25s: Barbara Bujtor, Helbert Shaw, Maria Mamah
- Groups: Kalandor zenekar, Inverz Duo, Plan B

== Contestants ==
Key:

– Winner
– Runner-Up
– Third Place

Category (mentor)	Chosen by mentor		Chosen by other mentors
Boys (ByeAlex)	Emánuel Gödöllei	Andor Vanek	Tibor Ruszó
Girls (Dallos)	Enikő Bagdi	Blanka Dárdai	Aletta Huszár
Over 25s (Gáspár)	Renátó Burai	Patrik Zdroba	Antal Balogh
Groups (Puskás)	C.O.O.L	Take 3	Speranta

== Results summary ==
In season nine, the rule from last season remained, four chairs wear place in the studio, which they can sit for, the mentors want to put forward to the next week, the seats on the chair may change during the show. Based on viewers' votes, another four contestants would be able to enter the next live show.

– mentored by Bogi Dallos (Girls)	– Danger zone; Safe
– mentored by Byealex (Boys)	– Safe
– mentored by Peti Puskás (Groups)	– Eliminated by SMS vote
– mentored by Laci Gáspár (Over 25s)

Contestant	Week 1	Week 2	Week 3	Week 4	Final Week 5	
Contestant	Week 1	Week 2	Week 3	Week 4	Round 1	Round 2
Tibor Ruszó	Safe	Safe	Safe	Safe	Safe	Winner; 63.00%
Andor Vanek	Safe	Safe	Safe	Safe	Safe	Runner-up; 37.00%
Patrik Zdroba	Safe	Safe	Safe	Safe	3rd	Eliminated (Week 5)
Emánuel Gödöllei	Safe	Safe	Safe	Eliminated	Eliminated (Week 4)	
Enikő Bagdi	Safe	Safe	Eliminated	Eliminated (Week 3)		
Renátó Burai	Safe	Safe	Eliminated	Eliminated (Week 3)		
Take 3	Safe	Eliminated	Eliminated (Week 2)			
Blanka Dárdai	Safe	Eliminated	Eliminated (Week 2)			
Aletta Huszár	Eliminated	Eliminated (Week 1)				
Antal Balogh	Eliminated	Eliminated (Week 1)				
C.O.O.L	Eliminated	Eliminated (Week 1)				
Speranta	Eliminated	Eliminated (Week 1)				
Eliminated	Aletta Huszár	Blanka Dárdai	Enikő Bagdi	Emánuel Gödöllei	Patrik Zdroba	Andor Vanek
Eliminated	Speranta	Blanka Dárdai	Enikő Bagdi	Emánuel Gödöllei	Patrik Zdroba	Andor Vanek
Eliminated	C.O.O.L	Blanka Dárdai	Enikő Bagdi	Emánuel Gödöllei	Patrik Zdroba	Andor Vanek
Eliminated	Antal Balogh	Take 3	Renátó Burai	Emánuel Gödöllei	Patrik Zdroba	Andor Vanek

== Live Shows ==
=== Week 1 (16 November) ===
- Group performance: "Nem elég"

– Get a chair, safe and go to the next live show

In the first live show, four chairs are placed, and the juries vote at least three yes, the competitors sit down. If each was full and another competitor has come, and the juries vote at least again three yes, the competitor with the lowest number of votes in the public vote would hand over the chair.

A summary of the contestants' performances on the first live show and results show, along with the results.
Act	Order	Song	Result
Patrik Zdroba	1	"Maniac"	Safe→danger zone; Saved
Aletta Huszár	2	"Csillag vagy fecske"	Safe→danger zone; Eliminated
Andor Vanek	3	"Diamonds"	Danger zone; Saved
Speranta	4	"Azt gondoltam, eső esik"	Safe→danger zone; Eliminated
Renátó Burai	5	"Love Runs Out"	Safe
C.O.O.L	6	"A folyó" (original song)	Danger zone; Eliminated
Enikő Bagdi	7	"Mindenkit elhagyunk" (original song)	Danger zone; Saved
Tibor Ruszó	8	"Apám sírjánál"	Safe
Blanka Dárdai	9	"Meg kell a búzának érni"	Safe
Take 3	10	"Blöff"	danger zone; Saved
Emánuel Gödöllei	11	"Mint egy filmben" (original song)	Safe
Antal Balogh	12	"Ne felejsd el"	Danger zone; Eliminated

=== Week 2 (23 November) ===
– Get a chair, safe and go to the next live show

In the second live show, three chairs are placed, and the juries vote at least three yes, the competitors sit down. If each was full and another competitor has come, and the juries vote at least again three yes, the competitor with the lowest number of votes in the public vote would hand over the chair.

A summary of the contestants' performances on the second live show and results show, along with the results.
Act	Order	Song	Result
Take 3	1	"7 Rings/God Is a Woman"	Safe→danger zone; Eliminated
Renátó Burai	2	"Világítótorony"	Safe→danger zone; Saved
Enikő Bagdi	3	"Another Brick in the Wall"	Safe→danger zone; Saved
Andor Vanek	4	"Hétköznapi"	Safe→danger zone; Saved
Blanka Dárdai	5	"Pillangó" (original song)	Danger zone; Eliminated
Emánuel Gödöllei	6	"Anyu büszke" (original song)	Safe
Patrik Zdroba	7	"Never Ending Story"	Safe
Tibor Ruszó	8	"Megtalállak" (original song)	Safe

=== Week 3 (30 November) ===
In the first round, there is only a vote and 1 competitor will be eliminated

– Get a chair, safe and go to the next live show

In the third live show, two chairs are placed, and the juries vote at least three yes, the competitors sit down. If each was full and another competitor has come, and the juries vote at least again three yes, the competitor with the lowest number of votes in the public vote would hand over the chair.

A summary of the contestants' performances on the third live show and results show, along with the results.
Act	Order	First song	Order	Second song	Result
Patrik Zdroba	1	"Eye of the Tiger"	10	"What Do You Mean?"	Safe
Andor Vanek	2	"Idontwannabeyouanymore"	8	"Vén Európa"	Safe→danger zone; Saved
Tibor Ruszó	3	"Despacito"	9	"Szabadíts fel!"	Safe
Renátó Burai	4	"I Was Here"	7	"Bolond vagyok mert téged szeretlek"	Danger zone; Eliminated
Enikő Bagdi	5	"Egyszer"	N/A	N/A (already eliminated)	Eliminated
Emánuel Gödöllei	6	"Kicsi lány" (original song)	11	"Emojies"	Danger zone; Saved

=== Week 4 (7 December) ===
– Get a chair, safe and go to the next live show

Week 4 changes the rules for the chair. In the event tie between the mentors' votes, the spectators' vote will determine whether or not the competitor is allowed to sit on the chair. In the fourth live show, two chairs are placed again, and the juries vote at least three yes, the competitors sit down. If each was full and another competitor has come, and the juries vote at least again three yes, the competitor with the lowest number of votes in the public vote would hand over the chair.

A summary of the contestants' performances on the fourth live show and results show, along with the results.
Act	Order	First song (Duet with a Celebrity)	Order	Second song	Result
Tibor Ruszó	1	"Nincs semmi másom" (with Attila Kökény)	2	"Van még más út"	Safe
Emánuel Gödöllei	3	"Téged" (with András Kállay-Saunders)	4	"Look Back at It"	Safe→danger zone; Eliminated
Andor Vanek	5	"A csönd éve" (with Ildikó Keresztes)	6	"Bruises"	Safe→danger zone; Saved
Patrik Zdroba	7	"Caruso" (with Erika Miklósa)	8	"The Show Must Go On"	Safe

=== Week 5 Final (14 December) ===
- Celebrity performer: USNK and Gigi Radics

A summary of the contestants' performances on the fifth live show and results show, along with the results.
Act	Order	First song	Order	Second song	Order	Third song	Order	Fourth song	Result
Tibor Ruszó	1	"Love Story"	4	"Túl az álmokon" (original song)	7	"A szívem udvarában" (with ByeAlex)	9	"Rád gondolok"	Winner
Patrik Zdroba	2	"Ashes"	5	"Kevés a szó" (original song)	N/A (Already Eliminated)				3rd Place
Andor Vanek	3	"Álomarcú lány"	6	"Még nem" (original song)	8	"Még mindig rólad írok dalt" (with ByeAlex)	10	"Never Enough"	Runner-up

== Ratings ==
Episode	Air date	Official rating (millions)	Weekly rank
Auditions 1	5 October	1.00	2
Auditions 2	12 October	1.18	1
Auditions 3	19 October	1.23	1
Auditions 4	26 October	1.40	1
Bootcamp	2 November	1.18	1
Six-chair challenge	3 November	0.93	3
Judges' houses 1	9 November	1.13	1
Judges' houses 2	10 November	0.98	2
Live show 1	16 November	1.10	1
Live show 2	23 November	1.06	1
Live show 3	30 November	0.94	2
Live show 4	7 December	0.87	3
Final	14 December	1.05	1
