= Lee Blair =

Lee Blair may refer to:

- Lee Blair (musician) (1903–1966), American jazz banjoist and guitarist
- Lee Blair (artist) (1911–1993), American artist

== See also ==
- Blair Lee (disambiguation)
