= Hungary in the Eurovision Song Contest 2019 =

- Eurovision Song Contest 2019
- Participating broadcaster: Médiaszolgáltatás-támogató és Vagyonkezelő Alap (MTVA)
- Country: Hungary
- Selection process: A Dal 2019
- Selection date: 23 February 2019

Competing entry
- Song: "Az én apám"
- Artist: Joci Pápai
- Songwriters: József Pápai; Ferenc Molnár

Placement
- Semi-final result: Failed to qualify (12th)

Participation chronology

Hungary was represented at the Eurovision Song Contest 2019 with the song "Az én apám", written by József Pápai and Ferenc Molnár, and performed by Pápai himself under the stage name Joci Pápai. The Hungarian participating broadcaster Médiaszolgáltatás-támogató és Vagyonkezelő Alap (MTVA) organised the national final A Dal 2019 in order to select its entry for the contest.

As of 2026, this was Hungary's last entry in the contest, before the broadcaster opted out of participating the following year. The absence has continued in every edition since.

== Background ==
Prior to the 2019 contest, Magyar Televízió (MTV) until 2010 and Médiaszolgáltatás-támogató és Vagyonkezelő Alap (MTVA) since 2011 had participated in the Eurovision Song Contest representing Hungary sixteen times since MTV's first entry in 1994. Their best placing was fourth, achieved with their début entry in 1994 with the song "Kinek mondjam el vétkeimet?" performed by Friderika Bayer. MTV had attempted to participate in the contest in 1993, however, its entry was eliminated in the preselection show Kvalifikacija za Millstreet. MTV withdrew from the contest for six years between 1999 and 2004 and also missed the 2006 and 2010 contests. In 2014, Hungary achieved its second-best result in the contest, placing fifth with the song "Running" performed by András Kállay-Saunders. In 2016, it placed 19th in the Eurovision final with the song "Pioneer" performed by Freddie. The following year they managed to finish in the top 10 again, now in the 8th place with "Origo" sang by Joci Pápai. In 2018, "Viszlát nyár" by rock-metal band AWS placed 21st in the grand final.

As part of its duties as participating broadcaster, MTVA organises the selection of its entry in the Eurovision Song Contest and broadcasts the event in the country. The broadcaster confirmed its intentions to participate at the 2019 contest on 1 October 2018. Since 2012, MTVA has organised A Dal, a national selection show which has managed to, thus far, produce entries that have qualified to the final each year and has resulted in three top 10 placings in 2013, 2014, and 2017.

== Before Eurovision ==
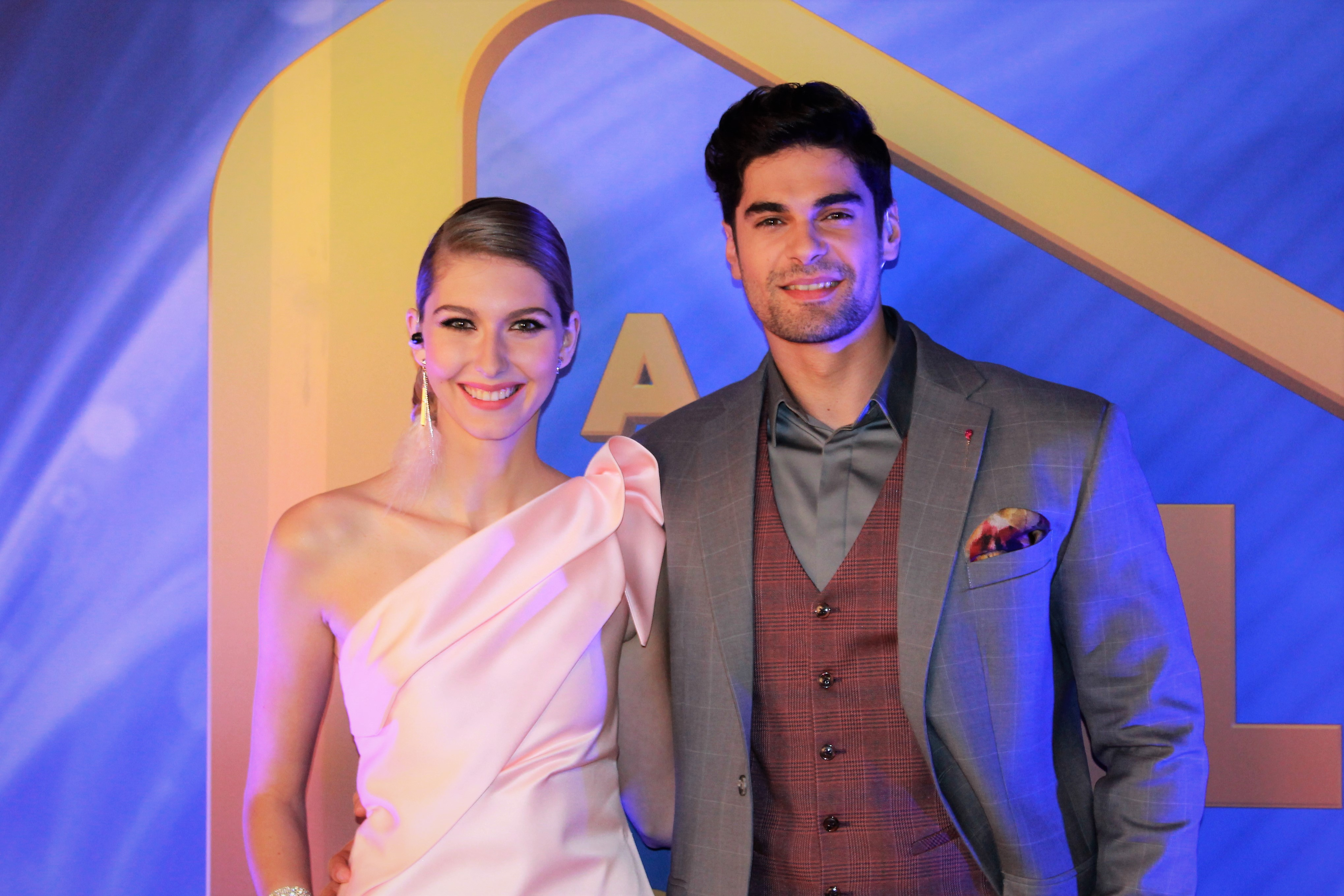
Bogi Dallos and Freddie, the hosts of A Dal 2019

=== A Dal 2019 ===
A Dal 2019 was the eighth edition of the national selection A Dal, which selected the Hungarian entry for the Eurovision Song Contest 2019. The competition consisted of 30 entries competing in three heats, two semi-finals, and a final. The hosts are Bogi Dallos and Freddie. At the first press conference on 3 December 2018, MTVA announced the hosts, the jury, the 30 competing songs, and introduced the new logo of the show. The former symbol was in use since the inauguration of the contest, and every year they added the current year in the logo. The new one looks like a play button, or a plectrum, written in the inside A DAL 2019.

==== Format ====
===== Judges =====
A jury panel consisted of four people:

- Feró Nagy: the lead singer of the Hungarian band Beatrice
- Lilla Vincze: the lead singer of the Hungarian band Napoleon Boulevard, was part of the Hungarian jury in the Eurovision Song Contest 2018
- Misi Mező: the lead singer and guitarist of the Hungarian band Magna Cum Laude
- Miklós Both: two times Fonogram-award winner performer and composer.
The A Dal 2019 judges

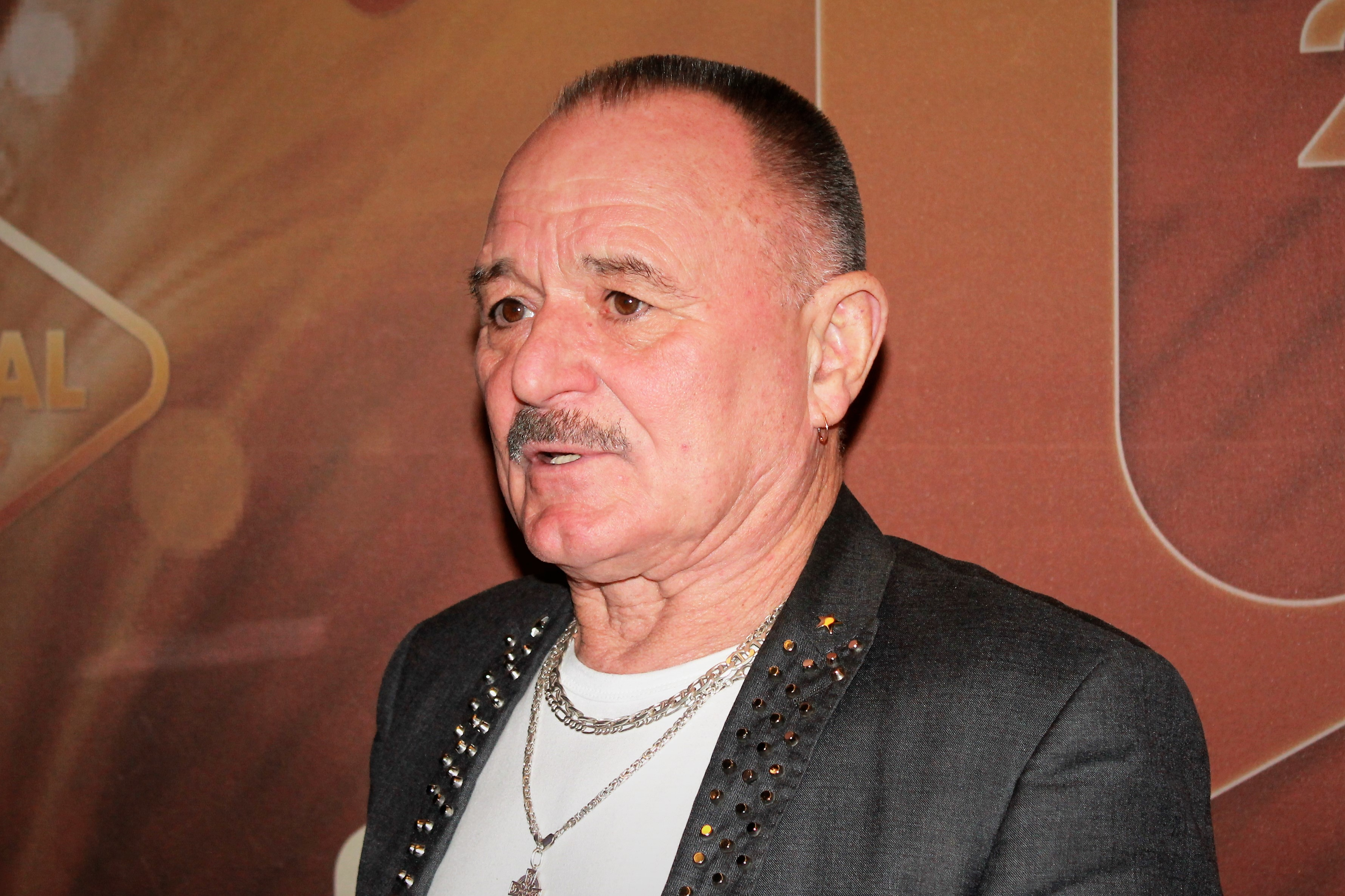
Feró Nagy

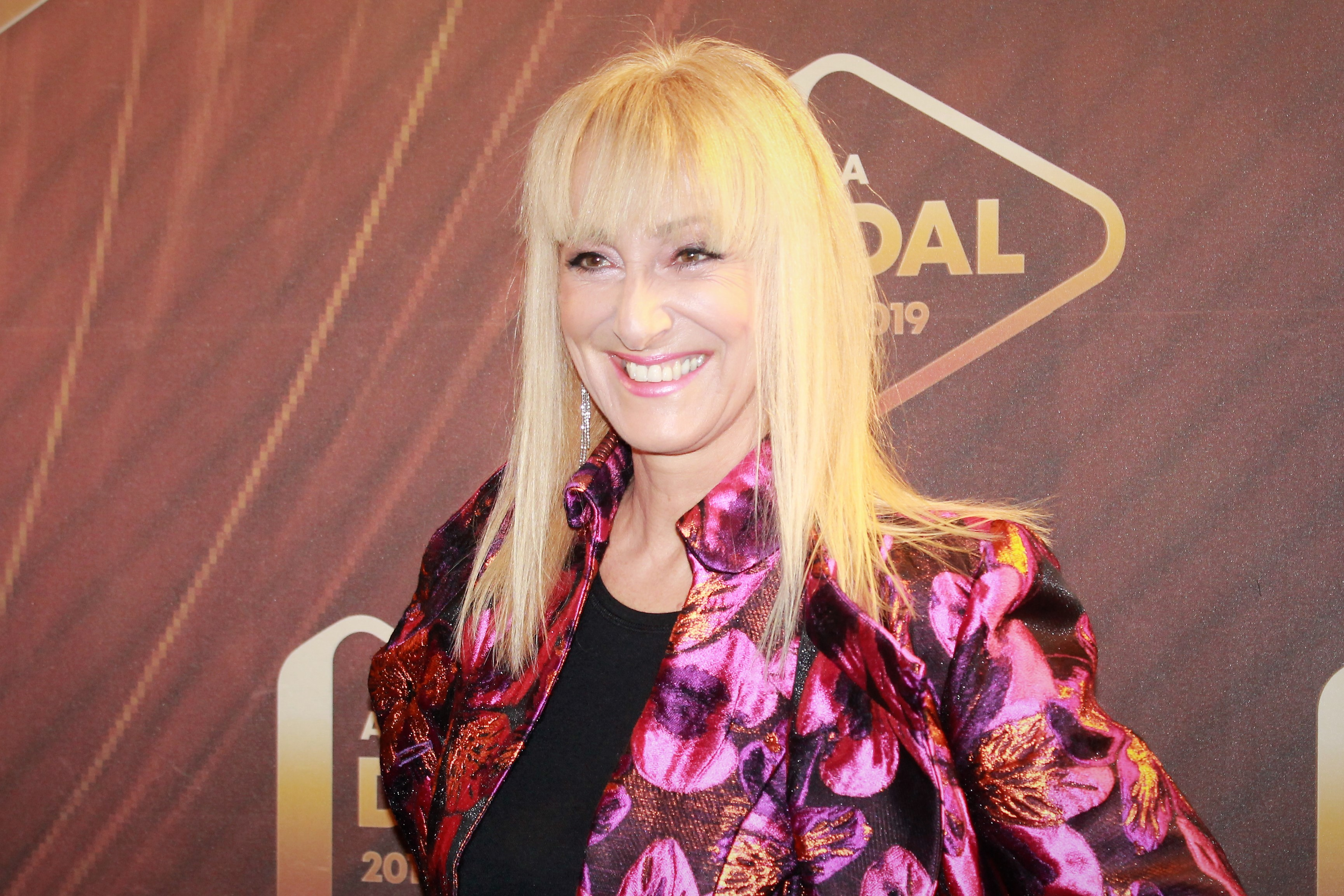
Lilla Vincze

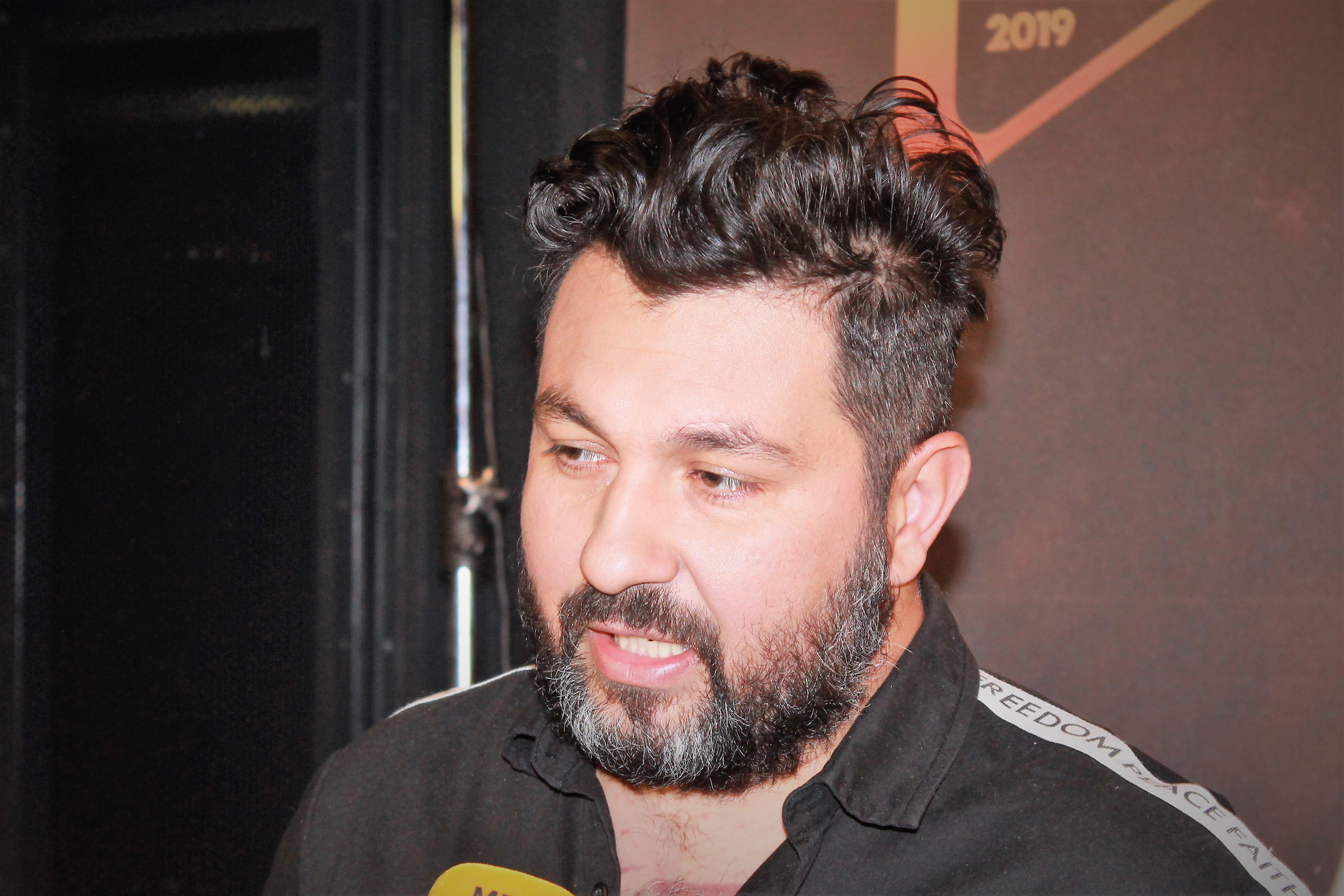
Misi Mező

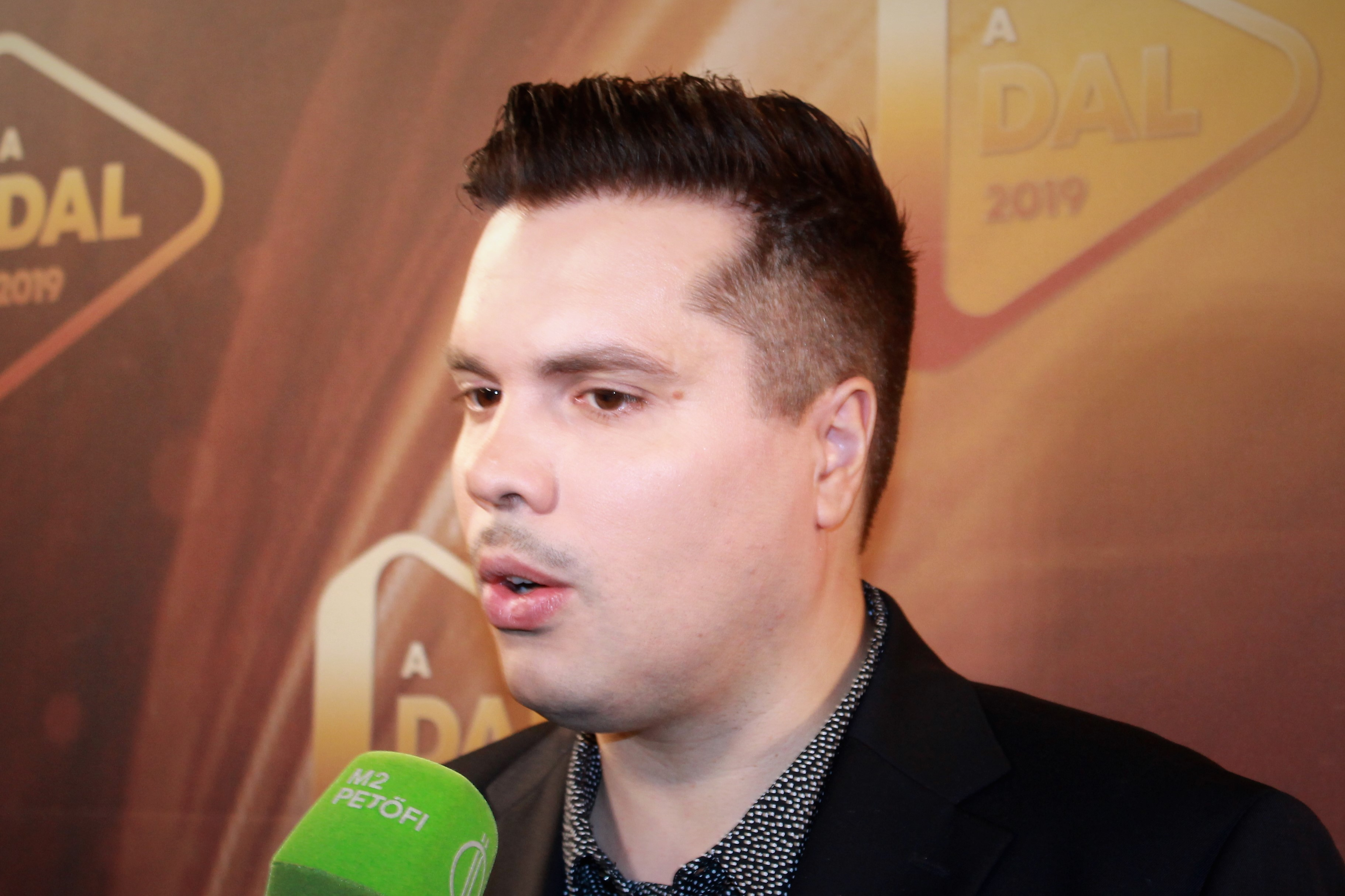
Miklós Both

==== Competing entries ====
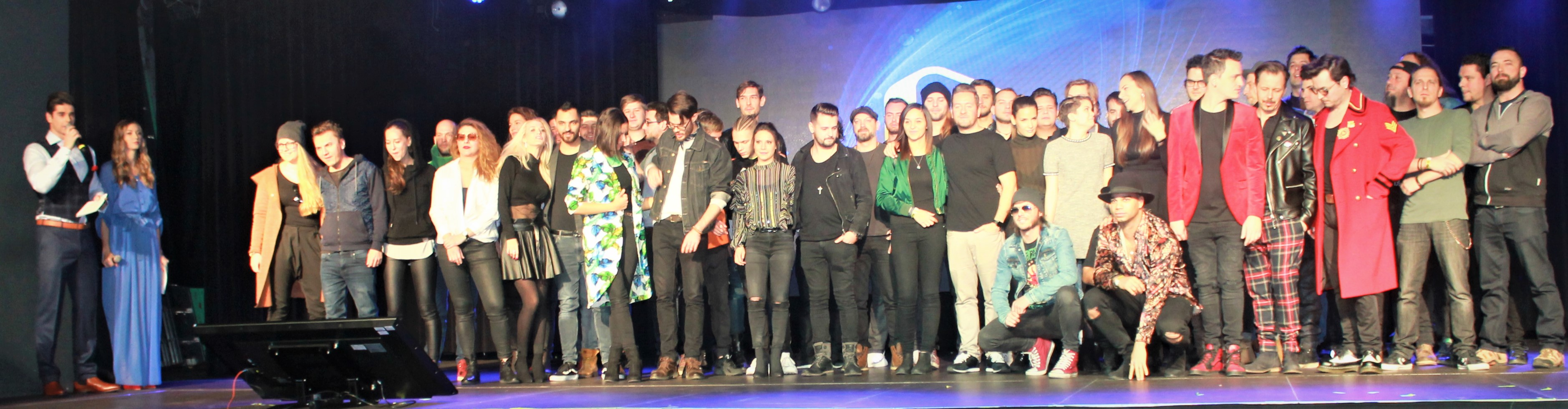
The top 30 entries of A Dal 2019

On 1 October 2018, MTVA opened the submission period for artists and composers to submit their entries up until 15 November 2018. One of the finalists, Petruska, was disqualified after MTVA alleged that his song was plagiarized.

Artist	Song	Songwriter(s)
Acoustic Planet	"Nyári zápor"	Szabolcs Kölcsey
Timi Antal feat. Gergő Demko	"Kedves világ!"	Tímea Antal, Johanna Szigyártó
Olivér Berkes	"Világítótorony"	Olivér Berkes, Arnold Vígh, Tamás Molnár
Deniz	"Ide várnak vissza"	András Vámos, Dénes Rizner Dénes
Diana	"Little Bird"	Viktor Rakonczai, Tamara Olorga
Fatal Error	"Kulcs"	Mihály Balázs, Miklós Balázs, Zsolt Rimóczi, Dávid Rónai, Botond Kornyik, Bence Joós
Gotthy	"Csak 1 perc"	Norbert Kovács, Ádám Gotthard
Klára Hajdu	"You're Gonna Rise"	Klára Hajdu, Milán Szakonyi
Barni Hamar	"Wasted"	Barni Hamar
Dávid Heatlie	"La Mama Hotel"	Péter Turóczi, Dávid Heatlie
Konyha	"Százszor visszajátszott"	Mátyás Szepesi, Miklós Toldi, Dániel Haller, Márk Badics
Kyra	"Maradj még"	Kyra Fedor
Leander Kills	"Hazavágyom"	Leander Köteles
The Middletonz	"Roses"	Farshad Alebatool, Attila Fehér Holló, András Kállay-Saunders
Mocsok 1 Kölykök	"Egyszer"	Tamás Pulius, Ádám Horváth, Kristóf Molnár, Ádám Csekő
Monyo Project	"Run Baby Run"	Endre Molnár, Edit Molnár
Bogi Nagy	"Holnap"	Ferenc Molnár 'Caramel'
Nomad	"A remény hídjai"	Szabolcs Jánosi, Marcell Juhász, Ábel Mihalik, Levente Nagy
Gergő Oláh	"Hozzád bújnék"	Gábor Mészáros, Mária Osztás
Joci Pápai	"Az én apám"	József Pápai, Ferenc Molnár 'Caramel'
Rozina Pátkai	"Frida"	Rozina Pátkai, Márton Fenyvesi, Zsófia Bán
Petruska	"Help Me Out of Here"	András Petruska
Ruby Harlem	"Forró"	Tamás Heilig, Szandra Iván
Salvus	"Barát"	Zoltán Pötörke, Péter Erdélyi, Gergely Kiss, Dániel Szabó
The Sign	"Ő"	Máté Gábor Czinke
Gergő Szekér	"Madár, repülj!"	Gergő Szekér
USNK	"Posztolj"	Dániel Somogyvári, Alex Márta
László Váray	"Someone Who Lives Like This"	László Váray
Bence Vavra	"Szótlanság"	László Csöndör 'Diaz', Kata Kozma, Bence Vavra, Máté Fodor
yesyes	"Incomplete"	Ádám Szabó, Dávid Danka 'Walston', Péter Halász

==== Shows ====
===== Heats =====
Three heats took place on 19 January, 26 January and 2 February 2019. In each heat ten entries competed and six entries qualified to the semi-finals after two rounds of voting. In the first round of voting, five qualifiers were determined by the combination of scores from each judge and an aggregate score from a public SMS and mobile app vote. In the second round of voting, the remaining five entries that were not in the initial top five faced a public vote consisting of votes submitted through SMS in order to determine one additional qualifier.

In addition to the competing entries, other performers featured during the shows. Skorpió performed their song "Azt beszéli már az egész város" as the interval act in heat 1, Bill Deák Blues Band performed in heat 2, and Fecó Balázs performed in heat 3.

Jury and public voting qualifier Public voting qualifier

Heat 1 – 19 January 2019
R/O	Artist	Song	F. Nagy	L. Vincze	M. Mező	M. Both	Viewers	Total	Result
1	Gergő Szekér	"Madár, repülj!"	8	9	8	8	8	41	Advanced
2	Konyha	"Százszor visszajátszott"	6	8	8	8	8	38	Advanced
3	László Váray	"Someone Who Lives Like This"	5	6	6	6	6	29	—N/a
4	Rozina Pátkai	"Frida"	5	7	7	7	5	31	—N/a
5	Barni Hamar	"Wasted"	6	6	5	5	7	29	—N/a
6	Olivér Berkes	"Világítótorony"	5	8	6	6	8	33	—N/a
7	Timi Antal feat. Gergő Demko	"Kedves világ!"	10	9	6	6	8	39	Advanced
8	Nomad	"A remény hídjai"	6	7	7	7	8	35	Advanced
9	Gergő Oláh	"Hozzád bújnék"	7	9	9	8	8	41	Advanced
10	Deniz	"Ide várnak vissza"	6	7	6	6	9	34	Advanced

Heat 2 – 26 January 2019
R/O	Artist	Song	F. Nagy	L. Vincze	M. Mező	M. Both	Viewers	Total	Result
1	Dávid Heatlie	"La Mama Hotel"	7	7	6	7	7	34	—N/a
2	The Middletonz	"Roses"	8	8	9	8	8	41	Advanced
3	Klára Hajdu	"You're Gonna Rise"	5	8	7	6	6	32	—N/a
4	Gotthy	"Csak 1 perc"	5	5	4	4	8	26	—N/a
5	Acoustic Planet	"Nyári zápor"	8	9	9	9	8	43	Advanced
6	Fatal Error	"Kulcs"	9	9	9	9	9	45	Advanced
7	Bence Vavra	"Szótlanság"	7	9	8	7	8	39	Advanced
8	Diana	"Little Bird"	6	7	7	6	8	34	—N/a
9	The Sign	"Ő"	7	7	8	8	8	38	Advanced
10	yesyes	"Incomplete"	7	6	7	7	8	35	Advanced

Heat 3 – 2 February 2019
R/O	Artist	Song	F. Nagy	L. Vincze	M. Mező	M. Both	Viewers	Total	Result
1	Leander Kills	"Hazavágyom"	7	8	7	7	9	38	—N/a
2	Petruska	"Help Me Out of Here"	8	8	9	8	7	40	Advanced
3	Monyo Project	"Run Baby Run"	7	7	7	7	7	35	—N/a
4	Bogi Nagy	"Holnap"	8	9	8	8	8	41	Advanced
5	Salvus	"Barát"	7	8	6	7	8	36	—N/a
6	Ruby Harlem	"Forró"	7	8	9	9	7	40	Advanced
7	Joci Pápai	"Az én apám"	8	9	8	8	8	41	Advanced
8	Kyra	"Maradj még"	5	6	6	5	6	28	—N/a
9	USNK	"Posztolj"	6	6	7	7	9	35	Advanced
10	Mocsok 1 Kölykök	"Egyszer"	8	8	8	7	8	39	Advanced

===== Semi-finals =====
Two semi-finals took place on 9 and 16 February 2019. In each semi-final nine entries competed and four entries qualified to the final after two rounds of voting. In the first round of voting, three qualifiers were determined by the combination of scores from each judge and an aggregate score from a public SMS and mobile app vote. In the second round of voting, the remaining six entries that were not in the initial top three faced a public vote consisting of votes submitted through SMS in order to determine one additional qualifier. Following the semi-final, Petruska was disqualified after MTVA alleged that his song was plagiarised. He was replaced in the final by Gergő Oláh, who had originally been eliminated but who was awarded a wildcard.

In addition to the competing entries, other performers featured during the shows. Miklós Varga and his children performed as the interval act in semi-final 1, and Republic performed in semi-final 2.

Jury and public voting qualifier Public voting qualifier Disqualified Wildcard qualifier

Semi-final 1 – 9 February 2019
R/O	Artist	Song	F. Nagy	L. Vincze	M. Mező	M. Both	Viewers	Total	Result
1	USNK	"Posztolj"	6	6	7	7	8	34	—N/a
2	yesyes	"Incomplete"	7	6	7	7	8	35	—N/a
3	Konyha	"Százszor visszajátszott"	6	8	8	8	8	38	—N/a
4	The Sign	"Ő"	7	7	8	8	7	37	—N/a
5	Petruska	"Help Me Out of Here"	8	8	9	9	8	42	Disqualified
6	Acoustic Planet	"Nyári zápor"	9	9	9	10	8	45	Advanced
7	Deniz	"Ide várnak vissza"	6	7	6	7	9	35	—N/a
8	The Middletonz	"Roses"	8	8	8	8	9	41	Advanced
9	Bence Vavra	"Szótlanság"	8	9	9	8	8	42	Advanced

Semi-final 2 – 16 February 2019
R/O	Artist	Song	F. Nagy	L. Vincze	M. Mező	M. Both	Viewers	Total	Result
1	Gergő Szekér	"Madár, repülj!"	9	9	8	8	9	43	Advanced
2	Nomad	"A remény hídjai"	7	7	7	7	8	36	—N/a
3	Mocsok 1 Kölykök	"Egyszer"	8	8	8	7	8	39	—N/a
4	Bogi Nagy	"Holnap"	8	9	9	8	8	42	Advanced
5	Gergő Oláh	"Hozzád bújnék"	7	9	9	8	8	41	Wildcard
6	Timi Antal feat. Gergő Demko	"Kedves világ!"	10	8	6	6	8	38	—N/a
7	Fatal Error	"Kulcs"	8	8	8	8	8	40	Advanced
8	Ruby Harlem	"Forró"	7	8	8	8	7	38	—N/a
9	Joci Pápai	"Az én apám"	9	10	9	8	9	45	Advanced

===== Final =====
The final took place on 23 February 2019 where the eight entries that qualified from the semi-finals competed. The winner of the competition was selected over two rounds of voting. In the first round, the jury determined the top four entries that would advance to the second round. The voting system for the four jurors was different from the method used in the heats and semi-finals. Each juror announced their scores after all songs had been performed rather than assigning scores following each performance and the jurors ranked their preferred top four entries and assigned points in the following manner: 4 (lowest), 6, 8 and 10 (highest). The four entries with the highest total scores proceeded to the second round. In the second round, "Az én apám" performed by Joci Pápai was selected as the winner via a public vote consisting of votes submitted through SMS, mobile app and online voting. In addition to the performances of the competing entries, guest performers included AWS, the winner of A Dal 2018 and who represented Hungary in 2018.

Advanced to the second round Winner

Final – First Round – 23 February 2019
R/O	Artist	Song	F. Nagy	L. Vincze	M. Mező	M. Both	Total	Place
1	The Middletonz	"Roses"	0	4	0	4	8	6
2	Gergő Oláh	"Hozzád bújnék"	0	0	0	0	0	8
3	Bogi Nagy	"Holnap"	10	6	0	0	16	4
4	Fatal Error	"Kulcs"	8	0	0	0	8	6
5	Joci Pápai	"Az én apám"	0	10	10	6	26	1
6	Gergő Szekér	"Madár, repülj!"	0	0	4	8	12	5
7	Acoustic Planet	"Nyári zápor"	6	0	6	10	22	2
8	Bence Vavra	"Szótlanság"	4	8	8	0	20	3

Final – Second Round – 23 February 2019
Artist	Song	Place
Acoustic Planet	"Nyári zápor"	—N/a
Bogi Nagy	"Holnap"	—N/a
Joci Pápai	"Az én apám"	1
Bence Vavra	"Szótlanság"	—N/a

== At Eurovision ==
According to Eurovision rules, all nations with the exceptions of the host country and the "Big Five" (France, Germany, Italy, Spain and the United Kingdom) are required to qualify from one of two semi-finals in order to compete for the final; the top ten countries from each semi-final progress to the final. The European Broadcasting Union (EBU) split up the competing countries into six different pots based on voting patterns from previous contests, with countries with favourable voting histories put into the same pot. On 28 January 2019, a special allocation draw was held which placed each country into one of the two semi-finals, as well as which half of the show they would perform in. Hungary was placed into the first semi-final, to be held on 14 May 2019, and was scheduled to perform in the first half of the show.

Once all the competing songs for the 2019 contest had been released, the running order for the semi-finals was decided by the shows' producers rather than through another draw, so that similar songs were not placed next to each other. Hungary was set to perform in position 7, following the entry from Czech Republic and preceding the entry from Belarus.

=== Semi-final ===
Hungary performed seventh in the first semi-final, following the entry from Czech Republic and preceding the entry from Belarus. At the end of the show, Hungary was not announced among the top 10 entries in the first semi-final and therefore failed to qualify to compete in the final. It was later revealed that Hungary placed twelfth in the semi-final, receiving a total of 97 points: 32 points from the televoting and 65 points from the juries, therefore missing out the final for the first time since 2010 when the country did not participate. With the old voting system, Hungary would have ranked 12th with 49 points.

=== Voting ===
Voting during the three shows involved each country awarding two sets of points from 1–8, 10 and 12: one from their professional jury and the other from televoting. Each nation's jury consisted of five music industry professionals who are citizens of the country they represent, with their names published before the contest to ensure transparency. This jury judged each entry based on: vocal capacity; the stage performance; the song's composition and originality; and the overall impression by the act. In addition, no member of a national jury was permitted to be related in any way to any of the competing acts in such a way that they cannot vote impartially and independently. The individual rankings of each jury member as well as the nation's televoting results will be released shortly after the grand final.

==== Points awarded to Hungary ====
Points awarded to Hungary (Semi-final 1)
Score	Televote	Jury
12 points	Serbia	
10 points		France
8 points		
7 points		Israel; Portugal
6 points	Slovenia	Australia; Montenegro; Poland; Serbia
5 points		Estonia
4 points		Czech Republic
3 points	Estonia; Iceland; Poland	
2 points	Czech Republic; Finland	Belarus; Belgium; Slovenia
1 point	Australia	Finland; Georgia

==== Points awarded by Hungary ====
Points awarded by Hungary (Semi-final 1)
Score	Televote	Jury
12 points	San Marino	Belarus
10 points	Iceland	Czech Republic
8 points	Estonia	Poland
7 points	Slovenia	Serbia
6 points	Poland	Estonia
5 points	Australia	Australia
4 points	Czech Republic	Greece
3 points	Cyprus	Slovenia
2 points	Serbia	Georgia
1 point	Greece	Iceland

Points awarded by Hungary (Final)
Score	Televote	Jury
12 points	Iceland	Czech Republic
10 points	Norway	North Macedonia
8 points	Netherlands	Belarus
7 points	Russia	Italy
6 points	San Marino	Denmark
5 points	Switzerland	Azerbaijan
4 points	Italy	Sweden
3 points	Slovenia	Switzerland
2 points	Azerbaijan	United Kingdom
1 point	France	Netherlands

==== Detailed voting results ====
The following members comprised the Hungarian jury:

- Attila Borcsik (Izil; jury chairperson) – head of music, DJ, music curator
- Béla Patkó (Kiki) – performer, singer
- Mátyás Szepesi – singer, songwriter, lyricist, lead singer of the band Konyha
- Judit Korsós (Lola) – singer, presenter
- Alexandra Iván – singer, songwriter, lyricist, lead singer of Ruby Harlem

Detailed voting results from Hungary (Semi-final 1)
R/O	Country	Jury							Televote	
R/O	Country	Izil	Kiki	M. Szepesi	Lola	A. Iván	Rank	Points	Rank	Points
01	Cyprus	9	10	14	14	11	15		8	3
02	Montenegro	16	4	16	13	7	13		14	
03	Finland	15	5	15	12	14	14		16	
04	Poland	1	3	7	9	4	3	8	5	6
05	Slovenia	3	16	12	7	6	8	3	4	7
06	Czech Republic	6	1	11	2	1	2	10	7	4
07	Hungary									
08	Belarus	10	2	1	1	2	1	12	11	
09	Serbia	8	6	3	11	5	4	7	9	2
10	Belgium	7	15	8	6	12	12		12	
11	Georgia	11	14	5	15	3	9	2	15	
12	Australia	5	9	6	5	8	6	5	6	5
13	Iceland	2	11	10	10	15	10	1	2	10
14	Estonia	12	13	2	4	9	5	6	3	8
15	Portugal	4	7	13	8	13	11		13	
16	Greece	13	12	4	3	10	7	4	10	1
17	San Marino	14	8	9	16	16	16		1	12

Detailed voting results from Hungary (Final)
R/O	Country	Jury							Televote	
R/O	Country	Izil	Kiki	M. Szepesi	Lola	A. Iván	Rank	Points	Rank	Points
01	Malta	15	7	26	16	10	17		20	
02	Albania	20	20	24	24	24	25		22	
03	Czech Republic	6	3	18	3	1	1	12	17	
04	Germany	21	15	20	10	9	19		25	
05	Russia	16	14	21	21	14	22		4	7
06	Denmark	5	10	7	14	3	5	6	19	
07	San Marino	23	26	11	26	26	23		5	6
08	North Macedonia	14	9	1	1	5	2	10	12	
09	Sweden	18	1	14	6	13	7	4	13	
10	Slovenia	3	21	22	15	15	14		8	3
11	Cyprus	11	23	16	20	19	21		18	
12	Netherlands	9	13	5	8	8	10	1	3	8
13	Greece	8	22	3	18	21	13		24	
14	Israel	7	25	15	19	7	15		11	
15	Norway	2	12	9	22	17	11		2	10
16	United Kingdom	12	8	13	9	2	9	2	26	
17	Iceland	1	24	19	17	25	12		1	12
18	Estonia	13	16	6	11	23	16		15	
19	Belarus	4	6	8	2	4	3	8	23	
20	Azerbaijan	17	5	2	7	18	6	5	9	2
21	France	26	18	10	13	12	20		10	1
22	Italy	10	2	4	5	20	4	7	7	4
23	Serbia	19	11	12	12	11	18		21	
24	Switzerland	25	4	23	4	6	8	3	6	5
25	Australia	24	17	17	23	16	24		14	
26	Spain	22	19	25	25	22	26		16	
