= Pusztai =

Pusztai is a Hungarian surname. Notable people with the surname include:

- Antal Pusztai (born 1978), Hungarian musician
- Árpád Pusztai (1930–2021), Hungarian protein scientist
- Oliver Pusztai (born 1981), Hungarian footballer
- Liza Pusztai (born 2001), Hungarian fencer
