= Ouwerx =

Ouwerx is a surname. Notable people with the surname include:

- Jane Brigode née Ouwerx (1870–1952), Belgian liberal and politician
- John Ouwerx (1903–1983), Belgian jazz pianist and composer
