= Kozlov Club =

Music club in Moscow, Russia

Coordinates: 55.7577°N 37.6344°E

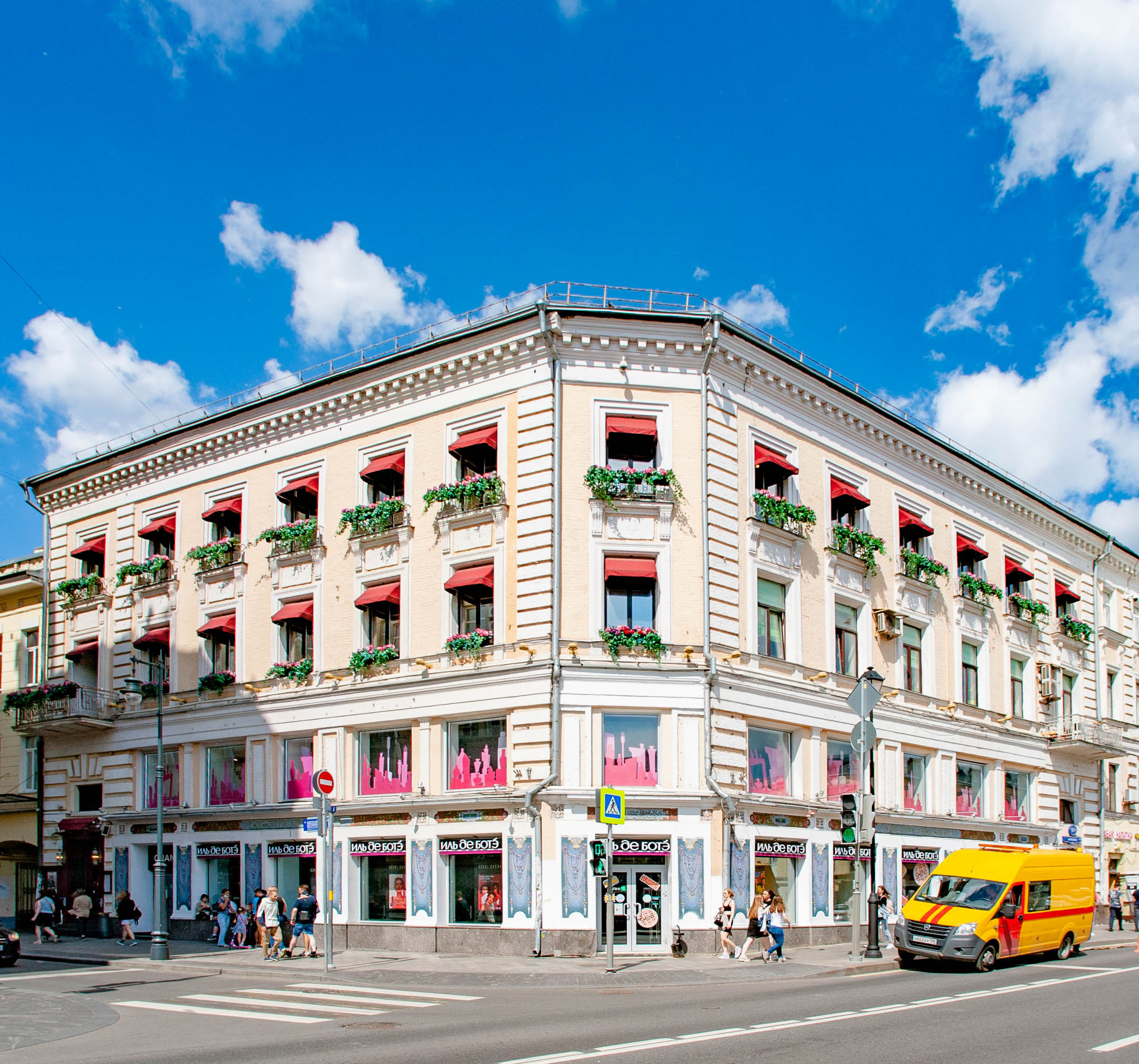
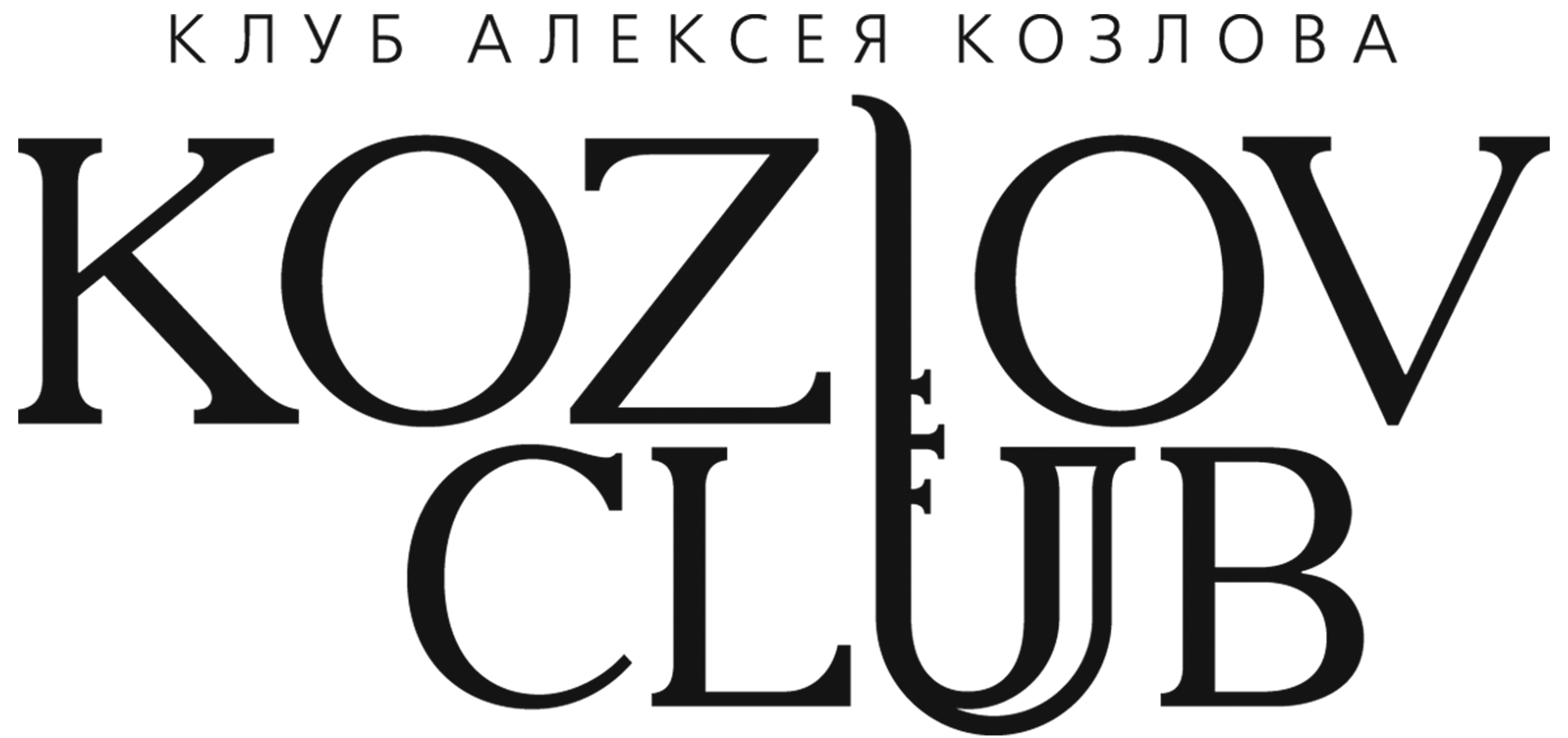
- Logo of Kozlov Club
- Interactive map of Kozlov Club
- Address: Maroseyka 9/2; Myasnitskaya 15
- Location: Moscow, Russia
- Capacity: 454
- Type: Jazz club

Construction
- Opened: 2012
- Renovated: 2017
- Expanded: 2018;2022

Website
- kozlovclub.ru

Kozlov Club (Russian: Клýб Алексéя Козлóва) is a music club that has been operating in Moscow, Russia, since 2012. The club changed location in 2017 and works now in the central area of Moscow, at Maroseyka str. 9/2 (subway stations Kitay-Gorod and Lubyanka), with its fourth stage opened in a different building at Myasnitskaya str. 15.

The biggest jazz club in Europe with its 4 independent stages. In 2019, named “World's Top Jazz Venue” by the poll of AllAboutJazz readers.

Provides a wide music range, with the main focus on contemporary jazz but also fusion, funk, soul, progressive and experimental rock, new age, world music, academic music, crossover etc.

== History ==
At first, the club was opened in the basement of the former Olympic Stadium in Moscow. The first concert took place on May 12, 2012, by Alexey Kozlov, the club's president. Official opening ceremony took place in the fall of 2012. The first club version had the single stage and allowed up to 300 attendants. In November 2014, the second stage was opened. In December 2016, the location was closed, and the building itself was later demolished.

The club relaunch at the new location was made in collaboration with Pub Life Group, a restaurant holding company. The club was provided with one of the floors of the "Left Bank" restaurant complex (which was in the reconstruction process at the time), located in a historical building (constructed in 1872). Today, the club occupies three upper floors of the building.The opening ceremony of the current club's location took place on May 31, 2017 with a concert of Scott Henderson Trio (US). The second club's stage, named "The Mansard", was launched on Sep.6, 2017. The third stage, "The Beat", was launched on Dec.13, 2018. The fourth stage, "Unplugged", was launched on Apr.21, 2022, at another building located in less than a kilometer from the main house.

== Founders and management ==
The club was created by the initiative of the Alexey Kozlov "ArtBeat" Fund, co-founded by a prominent jazz musician, People's Artist of Russia Alexey Kozlov, a music producer Igor Sandler and a businessman Sergey Khalin. During the first years of its existence the club was mostly supported by Khalin's donations.

Alexey Kozlov, whose name is given to the club in recognition of his personality's significance to Soviet and Russian jazz, is neither the club's owner nor manager. He stays the club's president and plays weekly gigs on the main stage, but makes no decision in programmation. Kozlov Club's art manager is Araik Hakobyan. Club's technical manager is Nikita Belykh, and the club's chief sound engineer is Alexey Belov

== Infrastructure ==
=== Stages ===
Kozlov Club runs four stages. Three of them are located at the same building at Maroseyka str. 9/2: the Main Stage hosts club's residents and touring international guests, "The Mansard" is mostly devoted to innovative programs of different styles, and "The Beat" recreates the atmosphere of small chamber halls and private gigs. The fourth stage, "Unplugged", is localed at Myasnitskaya str. 15 and is devoted to chamber concerts of all genres.

=== Equipment ===
Club's PA system, a Voice Acoustic (Germany), was provided by "Sound Technology" company. The club varies its technical gear on a regular basis, being a testing site for assorted professional sound and light equipment of top level. On the main stage, there is a Kawai acoustic grand piano, on The Beat stage - a German upright piano manufactured in 1902. Club owns some vintage keyboard instruments like Hammond electric organ and Fender Rhodes.

=== Design ===
The club's interior is designed with no computers' involvement by Irish architectural bureau. It features the classic Victorian style (expensive wooden parts, traditional English drapery, soft lights). In visuals, the illustrator Victor Melamed has participated; his production includes the design elements and posters.

=== Translations ===
The club runs daily internet translations of the gigs at the main stage, supported by the leading Russian social networks (Odnoklassniki, vKontakte) and the government-run web portal Culture.ru. That leads to average 200.000 views for each of the translated gigs.

=== Kitchen ===
The club's music program and kitchen are controlled by two independent management structures.

=== Other ===
The club's activities are tightly related with the record labels ArtBeat Music and Jazzist.

== Activities ==
On the four stages ("The Main", "The Mansard", "The Beat" and "Unplugged") the gigs of Russian and foreign musicians are taking place daily, and on certain days more with two (or more) different gigs at the same stage.

Club runs over a dozen of regular concert series with individual thematics, devoted either to certain musical stylistics (like jazz manouche) or concert format (like jam session) or education.

=== Outside the club's own stages ===
In 2020, the independent Jazzist webzine was launched, tightly related with the Kozlov Club team and activities; in 2021, the so-called record label, whose catalogue was opened with the recording of the club's resident, Dmitry Ilugdin Trio.

== Artists ==
Foreign artists who were featured at Kozlov Club are, among others, Jerry Bergonzi, Richard Bona, Chris Cain, Dennis Chambers, Avishai Cohen, Larry Coryell, Ezra Collective, Deitra Farr, Hadrien Feraud, Kekko Fornarelli, Frank Gambale, Gabriele Goodman, Guthrie Govan, Scott Henderson, Horacio Hernández, Alex Hutchings, Stanley Jordan, Scott Kinsey, Aubrey Logan, Lawrence "Boo" Mitchell, Dominique Di Piazza, Sainkho, Paco Sery, Arto Tunçboyacıyan, Kazumi Watanabe, Gary Willisc.

== Live albums recorded at Kozlov Club ==
- 2014: "Live At The Alexey Kozlov Club" - Anton Gorbunov & Friends
- 2014: "One Day / Live at Alexey Kozlov Club" - Odyssey Bogussevich & Armen Merabov
- 2014: "Embryolody / Live at Alexey Kozlov Club" - Zoolect
- 2015: "The Lone Bell At The Desert / Live at Alexey Kozlov Club" - Igor Ivanushkin Project
- 2015: "Jazz Punk Suite / Live at Alexey Kozlov Club" - M-Artel
- 2017: "Good Taste. Live Of Alexey Kozlov Club" - Kle2Go
- 2017: "Improvisation From A Suitcase / Live At Alexey Kozlov Club" - Anna Koroleva
- 2017: "Live At Alexey Kozlov Club" - Veteran & Co
- 2018: "Live At Alexey Kozlov Club' - Alexey Kuznetsov
- 2018: "Live at Kozlov Club, Moscow" - Christian Galvez Trio

== Awards and mentions ==
- 2017: winner at "Best Jazz Venue" nomination of the IV "All Jazz Colours" prize by Radio Jazz 89.1 FM
- 2019: winner at "Top Jazz Venue" poll by AllAboutJazz
- 2019: club's interior photos included in the book "In Another Silent Way" by Joachim Michael Feigl (Germany)
- 2021: winner at "Best Jazz Venue" nomination of the VII "All Jazz Colours" prize by Radio Jazz 89.1 FM
