= Blair Lee =

Blair Lee may refer to:

- Blair Lee I (1857–1954), United States Senator from Maryland, 1914–1917
- Blair Lee III (1916–1985), Lieutenant Governor of Maryland, 1971–1979

== See also ==
- Lee Blair (disambiguation)
