= Gergő Szekér =

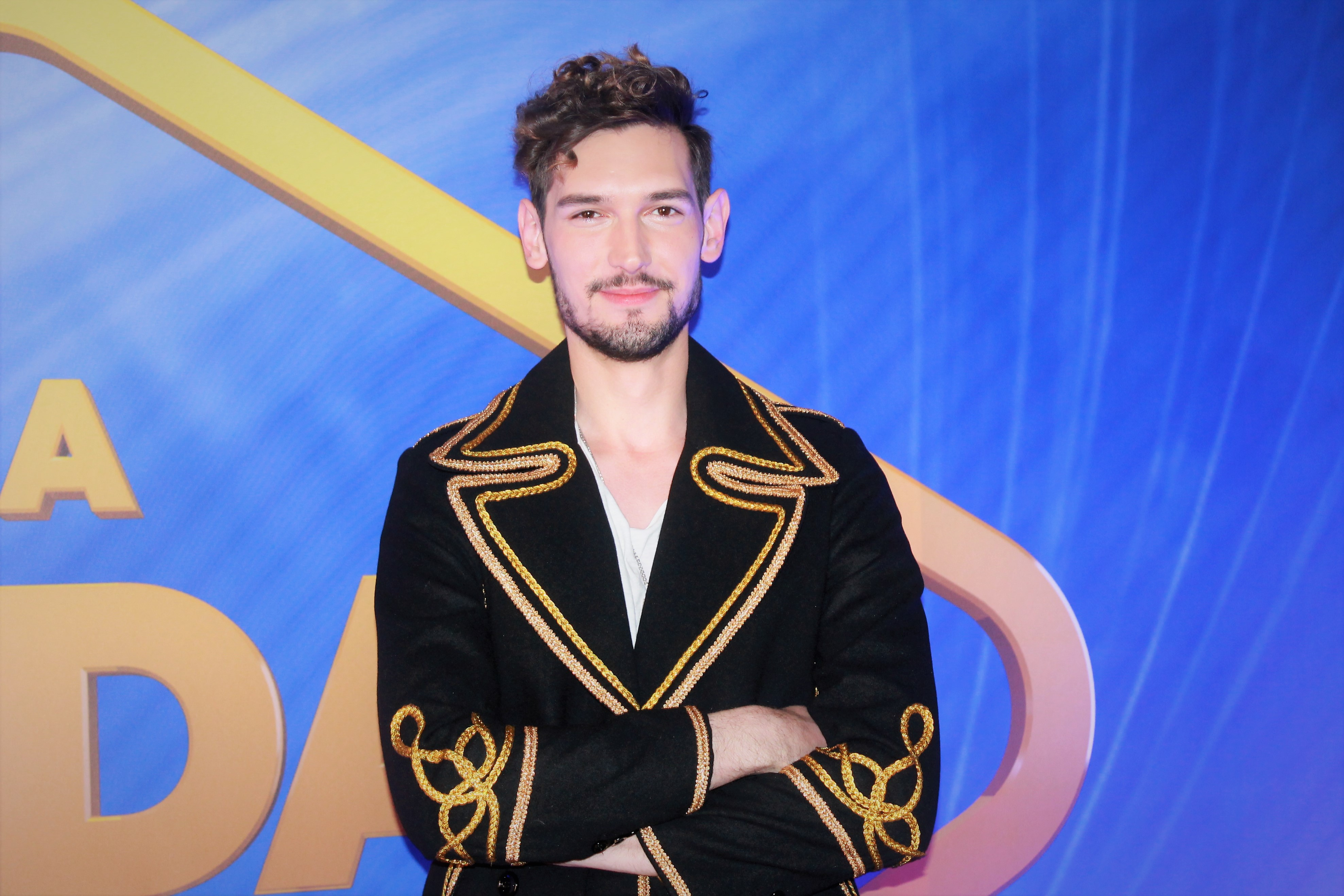
- Szekér in 2019.

Background information
- Born: 14 March 1995 (age 31); Štúrovo, Slovakia
- Occupation: Singer
- Instruments: vocals, piano
- Years active: 2012–present

Gergő Szekér (born 14 March 1995, Štúrovo) is a Slovak-Hungarian singer, actor, and composer. He is notable for being a competitor in the eighth season of X-Faktor and for participating in A Dal 2019.

== Biography ==
Szekér was born in 1995, in Štúrovo, Slovakia.

He finished his primary school studies at the Ferenc Liszt Music School, where he specialized in piano and singing. Until 2014, he studied in Szeged, at the László Kelemen School, where he gained stage experience, and thus could perform in the National Theater of Szeged. In 2016, he obtained his degree in acting at the Mária Gór Nagy School.

In 2018 he took part in the Hungarian version of the talent show X Factor, where Peti Puskás coached him. He was eliminated in the second live show.

On 3 December 2018, it was announced that Szekér would compete in A Dal 2019, the Hungarian national selection process for the Eurovision Song Contest 2019 in Tel Aviv, Israel with the song Madár, repülj!, where he came in 5th place in the final.

== Discography ==
=== Singles ===
Year	Song	Peak chart position						Album
Year	Song	Mahasz						Album
Year	Song	Rádiós Top 40	Editors' Choice	Magyar Rádiós Top 40	Dance Top 40	Single (track) Top 40	Stream Top 40	Album
2019	Madár, repülj!	–	–	–	–	–	–	N/A
