= X-Faktor series 8 =

X-Faktor
- Series 8
- Hosted by: Ramóna Kiss
- Judges: Laci Gáspár; Peti Puskás; Gigi Radics; ByeAlex
- Winner: USNK
- Winning mentor: ByeAlex
- Runner-up: Stolen Beat

Release
- Original network: RTL Klub
- Original release: 6 October – 15 December 2018

Series chronology
- ← Previous; Series 7 Next → Series 9

X-Faktor is a Hungarian television music competition to find new singing talent. Kiss Ramona presented her second series of X-Faktor. The eighth series aired on RTL Klub in 2018. ByeAlex, Laci Gáspár, Peti Puskás, and Gigi Radics remained in the jury in the 8th season. USNK won the competition and became the second group to win and also for the first time on the show that the final two were from the groups category.

== Auditions ==
Open auditions took place in Budapest on 16 February 2018. The judges' auditions started on June in Budapest.

== Judges' houses ==
This year there were no guest speakers, but every mentor would hear the performances of the four categories, then the mentor of that category would automatically bring two contestants to the live broadcasts and the remaining contestants would be assigned to the other three mentors who would select the third lead.

The thirteen eliminated acts were:

- Boys: Krisztofer László Balogh, Barnabás Erdélyi, Krisztián Váradi
- Girls: Szofi Ádám, Rita Csányi, Dominika Király, Dominika Tasi
- Over 25s: Ervin Kárász, Apolka Nagy, Patrik Zdroba
- Groups: The Gentleman Band, Helo Zep!, What's Upci

== Contestants ==
Key:

– Winner
– Runner-Up
– Third Place
– Withdrawn

Category (mentor)	Chosen by mentor		Chosen by other mentors
Boys (Puskás)	Krisztián Nagy	Gergő Szekér	Pál Kovács
Girls (Gáspár)	Tímea Arany	Gabriella Tamáska	Vivien Urbanovics
Over 25s (Radics)	János Balog	László Ölveti	Taka Kurokava
Groups (ByeAlex)	Stolen Beat	USNK	Ricky and the Drunken Sailors

At the X-Factor press conference on November 14, Krisztián Nagy announced that he was withdrawing from the competition.

== Results summary ==
In the eighth season, new rules were introduced, four chairs were placed in the studio, which they can sit for, the mentors want to put forward to the next week, the seats on the chair may change during the show. Based on viewers' votes, another four contestants would be able to enter the next live show.

– mentored by Laci Gáspár (Girls)	– Danger zone; Safe
– mentored by Peti Puskás (Boys)	– Safe
– mentored by ByeAlex (Groups)	– Eliminated by SMS vote
– mentored by Gigi Radics (Over 25s)

Contestant	Week 1	Week 2	Week 3	Week 4	Final Week 5	
Contestant	Week 1	Week 2	Week 3	Week 4	Round 1	Round 2
USNK	Safe	Safe	Safe	Safe	Safe	Winners; 62,95%
Stolen Beat	Safe	Safe	Safe	Safe	Safe	Runner-up; 37,05%
Gabriella Tamáska	Safe	Safe	Safe	Safe	3rd	Eliminated (Week 5)
Tímea Arany	Safe	Safe	Safe	Eliminated	Eliminated (Week 4)	
Pál Kovács	Safe	Safe	Eliminated	Eliminated (Week 3)		
Taka Kurokava	Safe	Safe	Eliminated	Eliminated (Week 3)		
Gergő Szekér	Safe	Eliminated	Eliminated (Week 2)			
Ricky and the Drunken Sailors	Safe	Eliminated	Eliminated (Week 2)			
László Ölveti	Eliminated	Eliminated (Week 1)				
Janó Balog	Eliminated	Eliminated (Week 1)				
Vivien Urbanovics	Eliminated	Eliminated (Week 1)				
Krisztián Nagy	Withdrawn (Week 1)					
Eliminated	László Ölveti	Ricky and the Drunken Sailors	Taka Kurokava	Tímea Arany	Gabriella Tamáska	Stolen Beat
Eliminated	János Balog	Ricky and the Drunken Sailors	Taka Kurokava	Tímea Arany	Gabriella Tamáska	Stolen Beat
Eliminated	Vivien Urbanovics	Gergő Szekér	Pál Kovács	Tímea Arany	Gabriella Tamáska	Stolen Beat

== Live Shows ==
=== Week 1 (17 November) ===
- Celebrity performer: AK 26 ("Blöff")
- Group performance: "Rise"

A summary of the contestants' performances on the first live show and results show, along with the results.
Act	Order	Song	Result
Janó Balog	1	"Let Me Entertain You"	Eliminated
Vivien Urbanovics	2	"Havana"	Eliminated
László Ölveti	3	"Come Together"	Eliminated
Stolen Beat	4	"Afrika"	Safe
Tímea Arany	5	"Focus"	Danger zone; saved
Pál Kovács	6	"Árnyékok"	Danger zone; saved
USNK	7	"Posztolj" (original song)	Safe
Taka Kurokava	8	"Let Me Love You"	Danger zone; saved
Gabriella Tamáska	9	"Jég dupla whiskyvel"	Safe
Ricky and the Drunken Sailors	10	"Raggamoffin 2"	Safe
Gergő Szekér	11	"Altass el"	Danger zone; saved

=== Week 2 (24 November) ===
- Celebrity performer: Follow the Flow ("Anyám mondta")

A summary of the contestants' performances on the second live show and results show, along with the results.
Act	Order	Song	Result
Ricky and the Drunken Sailors	1	"Hagyd meg nekem a dalt"	Eliminated
Gergő Szekér	2	"Tous les mêmes"	Eliminated
Gabriella Tamáska	3	"Queen"	Safe
Pál Kovács	4	"Tudnod kell" (original song)	Danger zone; saved
Stolen Beat	5	"Bulibáró"	Danger zone; saved
Tímea Arany	6	"What About Us"	Danger zone; saved
USNK	7	"!FogyaszdEl!" (original song)	Safe
Taka Kurokava	8	"Ha volna két életem"	Safe

=== Week 3 (1 December) ===
- Celebrity performer: Róbert Szikora & R-GO ("Ballag a katona"/"Szeretlek is meg nem is")

A summary of the contestants' performances on the third live show and results show, along with the results.
Act	Order	First song	Order	Second song	Result
Taka Kurokava	1	"The Way You Make Me Feel"	10	"Perfect"	Eliminated
USNK	2	"#tevagya" (original song)	11	"No Riches" (original song)	Safe
Pál Kovács	3	"Nem tudja senki"	N/A	N/A (already eliminated)	Eliminated
Stolen Beat	4	"Hol vagy" (original song)	8	"Kislány a zongoránál"	Danger zone; saved
Gabriella Tamáska	5	"I Say a Little Prayer"	7	"Fekete"	Safe
Tímea Arany	6	"Úgy szeretném meghálálni"	9	"Sorry Not Sorry"	Danger zone; saved

=== Week 4 (8 December) ===
- Celebrity performer: Ofenbach ("Katchi"/"Paradise")

A summary of the contestants' performances on the fourth live show and results show, along with the results.
Act	Order	First song (Duet with a Celebrity)	Order	Second song	Result
Stolen Beat	1	"Petőfi Sándor" (with Nemazalány)	2	"Helló lányok"/"No Diggity"	Safe
Tímea Arany	3	"Nem kell végszó" (with Gabi Tóth)	4	"Versace on the Floor"	Eliminated
Gabriella Tamáska	5	"#háttérzaj" (with Olivér Berkes)	6	"Shallow"	Danger zone; saved
USNK	7	"Beatbox"/"Freestyle" (with Tha Shudras)	8	"Szétcsapom"	Safe

=== Week 5 Final (15 December) ===
A summary of the contestants' performances on the fifth live show and results show, along with the results.
Act	Order	First song	Order	Second song	Order	Third song	Order	Fourth song	Result
USNK	1	"Intro" (original song)	5	"STOM" (original song)	7	"Choppers" (original song)	10	"See You Again" (with Gigi Radics)	Winner
Gabriella Tamáska	2	"7 Years"	4	"Bárhol" (original song)	N/A (Already Eliminated)				3rd Place
Stolen Beat	3	"U,U,U"	6	"Instaszívek" (original song)	8	"Gyöngyhajú lány"	9	"Minden este" (with Peti Puskás)	Runner-up

== Ratings ==
Episode	Air date	Official rating (millions)	Weekly rank
Auditions 1	6 October	1.19	1
Auditions 2	13 October	1.29	1
Auditions 3	20 October	1.32	1
Auditions 4	27 October	1.35	1
Bootcamp	3 November	1.18	1
Six-chair challenge	4 November	1.02	2
Judges' houses 1	10 November	1.17	1
Judges' houses 2	11 November	0.89	2
Live show 1	17 November	1.01	1
Live show 2	24 November	0.97	2
Live show 3	1 December	0.86	4
Live show 4	8 December	1.01	1
Final	15 December	0.90	2
