= Room of Mirrors =

Studio album by Kekko Fornarelli Kube
- Released: April 15, 2011
- Recorded: May 11–14, 2010
- Studio: Sorriso Studios, Bari, Italy
- Genre: Jazz
- Label: Auand; AU3002

Kekko Fornarelli Kube chronology
A French Man in New York (2008)	Room of Mirrors (2011)	Outrush (2014)

Room of Mirrors is the third album by Italian jazz musician and composer, Kekko Fornarelli, featuring his 'Kube' trio. It was released in 2011 by Auand records and was acknowledged by Fornarelli as a tribute to the late Swedish musician, Esbjörn Svensson.

Professional ratings
Review scores
Source	Rating
Jazzwise	3/5 stars
AllAboutJazz	3.5/5 stars

== Reception ==
Room of Mirrors was generally well received by critics upon release, with most reviews acknowledging Fornarelli's debt to Esbjörn Svensson while also noting Fornarelli's unique contribution to the evolution of the modern jazz piano trio.

Reviewing Kekko Fornarelli Kube during the promotion of Room of Mirrors, The Guardian jazz critic, John Fordham, highlighted Fornarelli's uniqueness, writing that "this classy threesome ha[ve] very different stories to tell" from that of The Bad Plus or "the guileful storytelling and impressionism of the late Esbjörn Svensson". Fornarelli's zeal for incorporating gospel and latin elements in his playing was also noted as a distinct point of difference from Svensson, demonstrating Fornarelli's descendence from the American jazz tradition.

== Track listing ==
1. Room of Mirrors
2. Daily Jungle
3. The Flavour of Clouds
4. Dreams and Compromise
5. Children's Eyes
6. Coffee and Cigarettes
7. Time Goes On
8. Night Lights

== Personnel ==
- Kekko Fornarelli: piano, fender rhodes, synthesizer
- Luca Bulgarelli: double bass, electronics
- Gianlivio Liberti: drums, percussion.
