= Acoustic Planet (band) =

Hungarian band

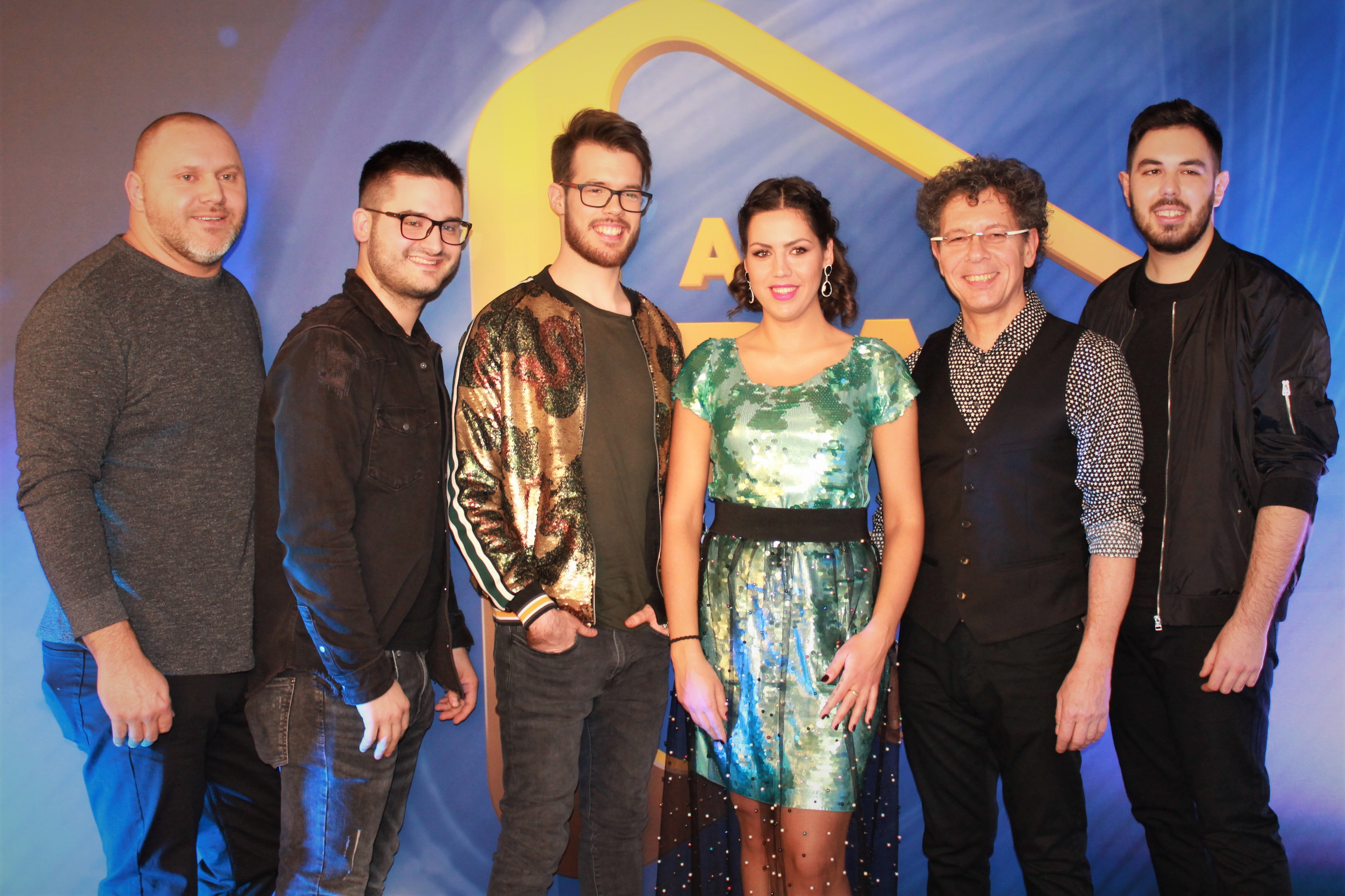
- Acoustic Planet in 2019

Background information
- Origin: Békéscsaba, Hungary
- Genres: Pop
- Years active: 2015–present
- Labels: Mistral Music
- Members: Réka Zsombok; Szabolcs Kölcsey; Zsolt Balázs; István Nagy; Tamás Fábián

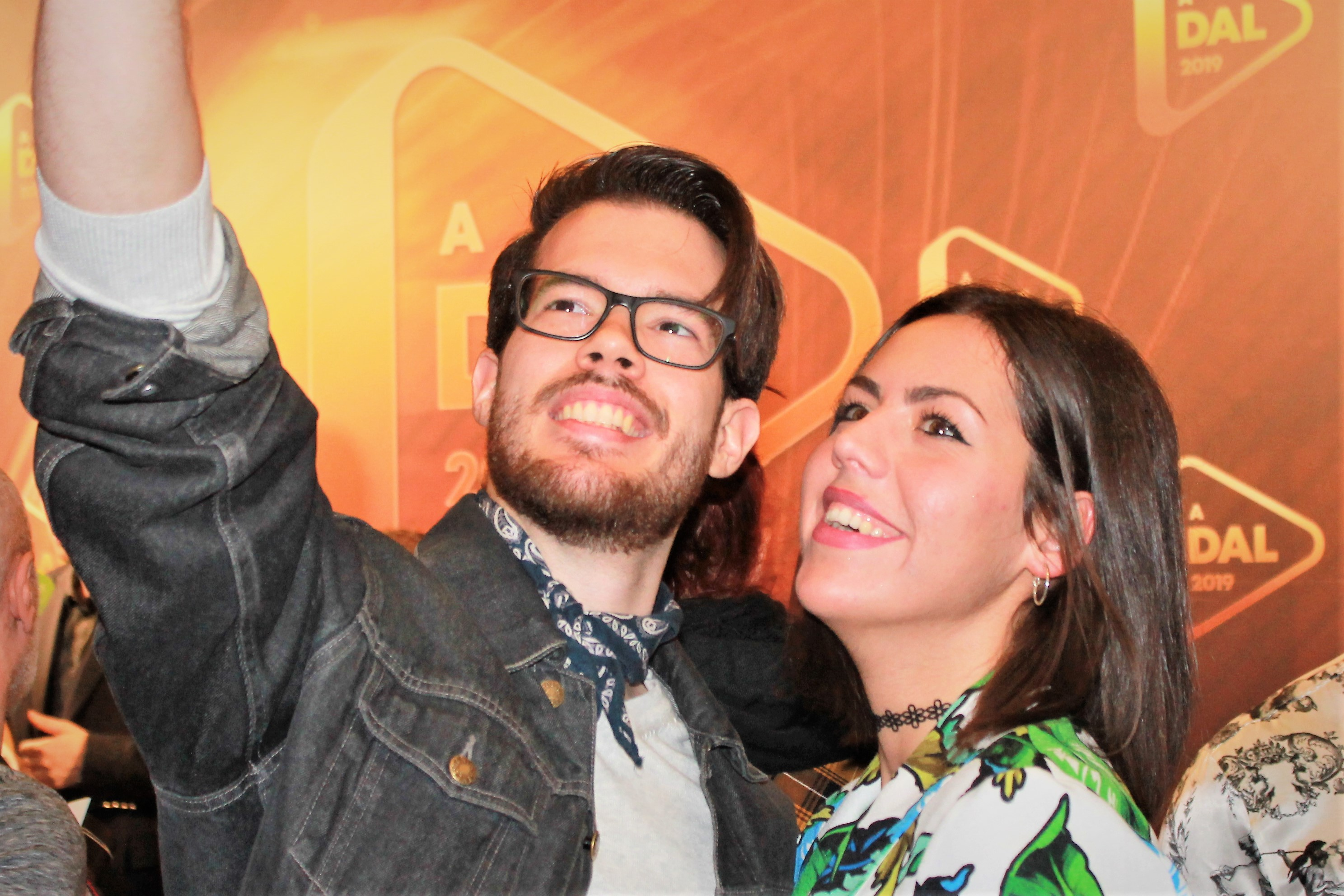
Szabolcs Kölcsey (left) and Réka Zsombok of Acoustic Planet in 2018.

Acoustic Planet is a Hungarian band from Békéscsaba, most notable for participating in A Dal 2019 with their song "Nyári zápor".

== History ==
The formation was based on acoustic basics, and have performed in many concerts and in large festivals. They have performed original songs, mainstream pop songs and processions in their repertoire.

They competed in A Dal 2019, the 2019 edition of the Hungarian national selection for the Eurovision Song Contest 2019, with the song "Nyári zápor". They reached the superfinal.

== Members ==
=== Current lineup ===
- Réka Zsombok: vocals
- Szabolcs Kölcsey: guitar, vocals
- Zsolt Balázs: bass
- István Nagy: drums
- Tamás Fábián: percussion

== Discography ==
=== Singles ===
- "Egy kicsit..." (2018)
- "Nyári zápor" (2018)
- "Felettünk a mindenség" (2018)

== Awards ==
- 2017: Street Song Competition (Eger): Best Band Title and Audience Award
- 2017: Veszprém Street Song Festival: Audience Award, Special Award
