= Wide Sound =

Wide Sound is an Italian jazz label.

Artists who have recorded for the label include Norah Jones, Roberto Gatto, Irio De Paula, Marco Di Meco, Peter Erskine, Danilo Rea, Maurizio Rolli, Angelo Valori, Fabrizio Bosso, Paolo Di Sabatino, Luca Mannutza, Luca Gianquitto, Fabio Morgera, Stefano di Battista, Bruce Cox, Krystle Warren, Josh Roseman, Marco Di Marzio.
