= For Four Orchestras =

Studio album by Anthony Braxton
- Released: 1978
- Recorded: May 18–19, 1978
- Venues: Hall Auditorium Oberlin College, Oberlin, OH
- Genres: Jazz, contemporary classical music
- Length: 114:30
- Label: Arista A3L 8900
- Producer: Michael Cuscuna

Anthony Braxton chronology
Creative Orchestra (Köln) 1978 (1978)	For Four Orchestras (1978)	Birth and Rebirth (1978)

For Four Orchestras is an album by American jazz saxophonist and composer Anthony Braxton, recorded in 1978 and released on the Arista label a triple LP. The album features a composition by Braxton written for four separate orchestras recorded in quadraphonic sound which was rereleased on CD on The Complete Arista Recordings of Anthony Braxton released by Mosaic Records in 2008. The album is dedicated to Eileen Southern.

== Background ==
Composition No. 82 for four orchestras was part of a planned series of multi-orchestral pieces which was to include a work for 100 orchestras in four cities, followed by even more ambitious works for orchestras on different planets, and in different star systems and galaxies. Braxton stated that he was "profoundly inspired" by Karlheinz Stockhausen's Gruppen and Carré, as well as by the works of Iannis Xenakis, but also acknowledged the influence of Kansas City jazz of the 1920s and 1930s. He recalled: "There has always been something special about the reality of different ensembles making music in the same physical universe space that has excited my imagination. It is as if the whole of the universe were swallowed up–leaving us in a sea of music and color.

Braxton described Composition No. 82 as having to do with "the factoring of distance," and stated that his goal was to "create a sound environment like star systems." The orchestras are placed in corners of the auditorium, arranged at different levels, with the audience situated in the middle, and both the musicians and the audience sit on swivel chairs. The four conductors are linked by television monitors, which are also used by the musicians when they are asked to swivel away from their group's conductor.

The recording took place at Oberlin Conservatory, and involved student musicians with four faculty members as conductors. The project presented a number of challenges, ranging from the need to copy 160 parts plus four conductor scores, to the process of having to assemble nearly a thousand brief recorded segments in order to construct a master tape. In the end, only two-thirds of the work was recorded, and Braxton eliminated another thirty minutes in order to maintain sound quality on the LPs.

== Reception ==
Professional ratings
Review scores
Source	Rating
AllMusic	1.5/5 stars
Tom Hull – on the Web	B+
DownBeat	5/5 stars

The AllMusic review by Brian Olewnick stated: "the results don't live up to expectations. 'Composition 82' is written in an extremely dry academic style with little differentiation of its course... the musical material itself sounds routinely dreary and uninspired, as if Braxton was declaring that he too could write music as sterile and vapid as his European contemporaries. One might more charitably, however, write this effort off as an interesting experiment that failed; ideas appear herein that would bear far more beautiful fruit in later works".

Reviewing the rereleased recordings for All About Jazz, Clifford Allen observed "The work moves in cycles based around single chords... there is an affinity for instrumental flurries presenting themselves in relation to a steady and central pulse... one never gets the sense of an overbearing sonic weight. Rather, each orchestra operates as a separate but interactive living organism, conducted and arranged in specific relation to the others... Braxton's Four Orchestras expand a color field without pushing those colors too far out of the canvas' edges".

Writing for Point of Departure, Art Lange called the piece "a remarkable, audacious, dazzling, dizzying achievement," and praised its "epic scope." In a review of the 2008 reissue, he commented: "While it still requires a serious commitment on the part of the listener, 40 years of Braxton's music have prepared us to hear For Four Orchestras in a new light, and recognize its value in a broader context than was previously possible."

DownBeat awarded 5 stars. Art Lange wrote, "this is a remarkable release, one which gives evidence that Anthony Braxton is at the forefront not only of instrumentalists, but of composers of every classification. No longer can he be pigeonholed as a 'jazz composer'.”

== Track listing ==
All compositions by Anthony Braxton.

1. "308M-64 / 30 / C4DM(R)- Z (For Four Orchestras) [Composition 82]" - 114:

== Personnel ==
Instrument	Orchestra I	Orchestra II	Orchestra III	Orchestra IV
conductor	Kenneth Moore	Gene Young	Robert Baustian	Murray Gross
violin I	Francine Swartzentruber; Shelley Fowle; Lilyn Graves; Lorraine Adel; Robert Scarrow	Barry Sargent; Zabeth Oechlin; Edward Shlasko; Steven Schuch; Audrey Hale	Karin von Gierke; Stanislav Branovicki; Susan Demetris; Monique Reid; Judith Bixler	Peter Jaffe; Diane Cooper; David Wilson; Pamela Stuckey; Mary Bolling
violin II	Marriane Smith; Marcus Woo; Amorie Robinson; Jennifer Steiner; Kathy Blackwell	Lori Fay; Andra Marx; Alison Feuerwerker; Ellen Ziontz; Lauri Gutman	Sally Becker; Elizabeth Welch; Susan Brenneis; Julie Badger; Jane Moon	Shannon Simonson; Lynda Mapes; Margaret Morgan; Johnathan Dunn; Jennifer Doctor
viola	Naomi Barlow; James Thomas; Sarah Bloom; Rachel Yurman	Amy Leventhal; Jeffery Durachta; Kathleen Elliott; Helen McDermott	Nanci Severance; David Rogers; Dee Ortel; Beth Thorne	Norin Saxe; Theodore Chemey; Alex Guroff; Igor Polisitsky
cello	Steven Harrison; Elizabeth Warren; Suzanne Wijsman; Elizabeth Knowles	Tom Rosenberg; Steven Drake; Dawn Wilder; Sarah Binford	Carol Elliott; Aaron Henderson; Matthew Wexler; Michele McTeague	Kathy Kelly; Daniel Kazez; Carole Stipleman; Steven Wise
bass	Mark Shapiro; Suzanne Tarshis; Leon Dorsey	Michael Talbert; Robert Adair; Mikkel Jordan	Jeffrey Hill; Matthew McCauley; Jeffrey Soule	Arthur Kell; David Seckinger; Daniel Savage
flute and piccolo	Celeste Johnson	Leonard Garrison	Betsy Adler	Virginia Elliott
alto flute	Joel Karr	Wendy Tarnoff	Adam Kuenzel	Carol Goodwillow
clarinet	Michael Zakim	David Hostetler	Bela Schwartz	James Colbert
clarinet and E♭clarinet	John Guest	Marty Rossip	David Bell	Marta Schworm
bass clarinet	Mark Gallagher	Cynthia Douglass	David Ballon	Carol Robinson
oboe	Pamela Hill	Carolyn Hove	James Hois	Michael Harrison
English horn	Cameron McClusky	Giselle Lautenbach	Bernard Gabis	Claudia Patton
bassoon	Allen Smith	Ann Kosanovic	Deanna Kory	Mark Gross
trumpet	John Bourque; David Driesen	Alan Campbell; Thomas Gotwals	Dave Rinaldi; Chris Kerrebrock	James Kirchenbauer; William Camp
trombone	Robert Asmussen; Richard Ruotolo; Mark Kaiser	David Fogg; Ann Mondragon; David Stocklosa	Bradley Cornell; Kadie Nichols; Mark Adams	Brian Campbell; Eileen Jones; Erik Johnson
tuba	Barry Jenson	Brian Bailey	Steven Box	John Lomonaco
harp	Cynthia Mowery	Naomi Markus	Nancy Lendrim	Susan Kelly
percussion	John Gardner; Andrew Collier; Stephen Pascher	David Wiles; John Kennedy; Philip Seeman	Galen Work; Gregg Linde; Victor Thomas	Andre Whatley; Charles Wood; Derek Davidson
