= Marc Demuth =

Luxembourgish jazz musician

Marc Demuth (born 1978) is a Luxembourgish jazz musician who has founded different jazz bands. He is also a composer and he plays double bass and electric bass.

== Education ==
Born in Luxembourg City in 1978, holds diplomas in electric bass and Jazz double bass of the “Conservatoire Royal de Bruxelles”, as well as a bachelor and a master's degree of the Royal Conservatory of The Hague, the Netherlands.

== Biography ==
In 1996, at the young age of 18, he won a scholarship for studying electric bass at the famous Berklee College of Music, while participating at their annual workshop in Perugia, Italy. In December 2000 he accompanied the World Youth Choir on their tour through Benelux, Germany and France, which ended with the recording of a CD. In 2004 he was selected to be part of the European Jazz Orchestra on their tour through Europe and Brazil, under the conduction of the Portuguese leader and composer Pedro Moreira.
From 2003 to 2010 he was working with the Portuguese singer Sofia Ribeiro in different projects, having released his first CD, “Dança da Solidão” in 2006, in duo with the singer. At the same time Marc was leading his own quartet with the vibraphone player Pascal Schumacher, the clarinet player Joachim Badenhorst and the drummer Yves Peeters. In 2008 he releases the CD “ORIK” with the Marc Demuth 4tet featuring Sofia Ribeiro.

He shared the stage with musicians like Michael Brecker, Kenny Werner, Slide Hampton, Erwin Van, Hein van de Geyn, Florian Weber, Jef Neve, John Ruocco, Guy Cabay, Jacques Pirroton, Phil Abraham and Felix Simtaine, amongst others.

He has been playing in many different festivals like: Montreux Jazz Festival (Switzerland), Brussels Jazz Marathon (Belgium), North Sea Jazz Festival (Netherlands), European Jazz Festival (Greece), Festival JAZZ AND SOUND (Belgium), Francophonie New York (E.U.A.), FIMU (France), Jazzfest Eurocore Trier (Germany), Jazz ‘In Tondela (Portugal), Douro Jazz (Portugal), Jazz-Rallye Luxembourg City (Luxembourg), Jazz UTSAV Festival (New Delhi), Dose Dupla (CCB, Lisbon), Gaume Jazz Festival (Belgium), Jazz au Chellah (Morocco), Jazz à Ouaga (Burkina Faso), Silesian Jazz Festival (Poland), Völklinger Hüttenjazz Festival (Germany), Nargen Jazz Festival (Estonia).

Since 2011 he is part of the Reis Demuth Wiltgen trio with pianist Michel Reis and drummer Paul Wiltgen. They formed the REIS DEMUTH WILTGEN Trio in 1998 while still in high school and performed on a regular basis in and around Luxembourg for a couple of years. The trio reunited in 2011 eager to share their experiences and new music. Their self-titled first album was released on Laborie Jazz to widespread critical acclaim. Since the release, the band has toured extensively throughout the world and has appeared at major international jazz festivals. The band's sophomore album "Places In Between" was recorded in New York City and released on Double Moon Records in 2016. The trio is now signed to the Italian label CAM JAZZ for whom they have recorded two albums: “Once In A Blue Moon” (2018) and their latest release "SLY".

In 2016, the trio started collaborating with world-renowned saxophonist Joshua Redman. Redman says that he fell in love with their music from the moment he heard them when his own quartet was playing a double bill with REIS DEMUTH WILTGEN at a festival in France. He has been playing several of the trio's compositions with his own bands. In March 2018, the trio toured in Europe with Joshua Redman as a featured guest. This tour included a performance at the Philharmonie Luxembourg featuring the music of REIS DEMUTH WILTGEN arranged for the Orchestre Philharmonique du Luxembourg by multiple Grammy Award winning composer and conductor Vince Mendoza. The trio recorded this repertoire in 2022 with Redman and Mendoza at the Luxembourg Philharmonic. The album will be released on CAM Jazz in 2024.

In November 2022, commissioned by Esch22 European Capital Of Culture, REIS DEMUTH WILTGEN premiered their project Synaesthesia during a sold out 10-show run in Luxembourg. In collaboration with multimedia artist and filmmaker Emile V. Schlesser, the trio created a walk-in installation featuring holographic 360-degree video projection surrounding the audience; an audiovisual experience, where music is translated into color, shape and movement in a fully immersive environment.

"SLY" is REIS DEMUTH WILTGEN's fourth release. Sticking with the known acoustic piano trio format, the album features new works exclusively and captures the trio's current musical identity and the strong voice it has developed among piano trios in recent years

Marc Demuth is based in Luxembourg, and he is leading the jazz-department of the Music School of Echternach where he also teaches electric bass, double bass and jazz ensemble.

== Awards and honors ==
- Best Soloist - Rotary Jazz Competition, Belgium (2001)
- Together with the Pascal Schumacher Quartet, First Prize and Public Prize, Tremplin Jazz Avignon (2004)
- Together with the Portuguese singer Sofia Ribeiro in duo, First Prize at the Crest Vocal Jazz Competition (2010)
- 2013: Export Artist of the Year award with Reis Demuth Wiltgen Trio by the Luxembourgish export office music:LX

== Discography ==
- Dança da Solidão with Sofia Ribeiro (2006)
- ORIK feat. Sofia Ribeiro (2008)
- Reis Demuth Wiltgen (Laborie Jazz, 2013)
- Places in Between (Double Moon, 2015)
- Once in a Blue Moon (Cam Jazz, 2018)
- Sly (Cam Jazz, 2021)
