= Luca Gianquitto =

- Born: 29 September 1978 (age 47); Naples
- Origin: Italy
- Genres: Jazz
- Occupations: Musician, composer, music educator
- Instrument: Guitar
- Website: www.lgguitaracademy.com

Luca Gianquitto (Italian pronunciation: [ˈluːka dʒaŋˈkwitto]; born 29 September 1978 in Naples, Italy) is an Italian guitarist and music composer living in Amstelveen, Netherlands.

== Biography ==
Gianquitto's mediterranean style is mainly influenced by jazz, blues and rock. In 2005 he was recognised among the “New Italian Jazz talents” by Chicco Bettinardi commission and in the same year he signed off a contract with Wide Sound releasing the instrumental album My Big Room. A track of the CD, “Floriana” was represented in Italian Jazz, Vol.3 (2010), a compilation featuring some of the most influential Italian jazz musicians of the year. In 2016 Luca released a second instrumental album Nibiru (LG Music). The CD was presented with a sold-out concert at The Royal Concertgebouw of Amsterdam.

During his career he travels and plays as professional musician on venues and events such as Montreal Jazz Festival, Eurojazz in Mexico City, Istanbul Jazz Festival. Besides the live performances Luca's guitar has recorded music for movies, big bands, rock projects, and other countless collaborations with jazz and pop artists. Luca has a master's degree in Jazz Music at the Conservatory of Naples, specializing in Big Band arrangement and Jazz Improvisation. In 2014 he published the treaty of harmony “Le scale napoletane nel jazz” (JazzItalia), academically considered a valuable contribution to musicological research.

In 2013 Luca founded LG Guitar School – Amstelveen (NL), a music institute that today (2017) counts a team of 8 music teachers and about 150 guitar and piano students.

== Discography ==
- 2005: My Big Room (Wide Sound)
- 2016: Nibiru (LG Music)
