= USNK =

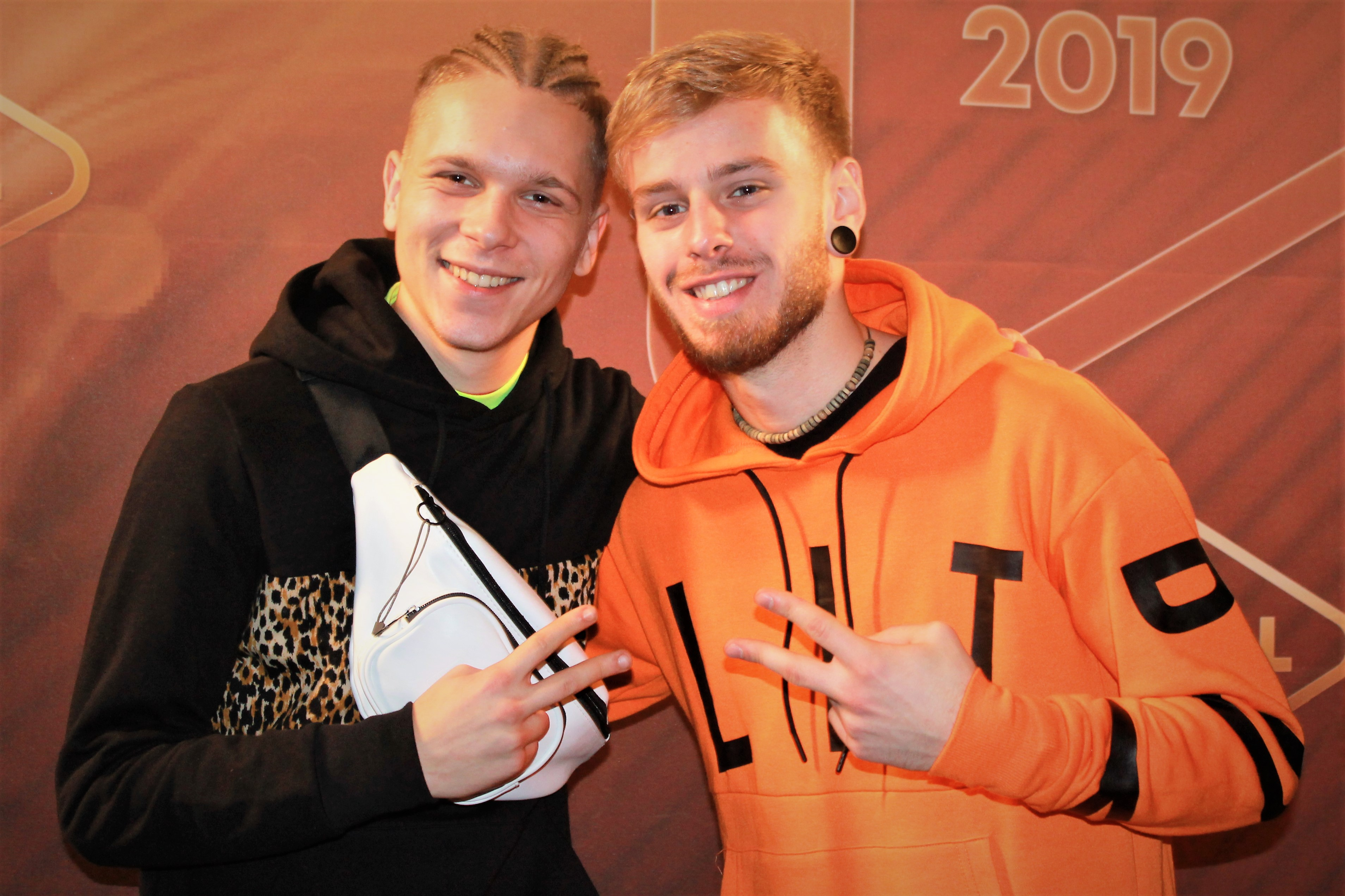

Background information
- Origin: Cluj-Napoca, Romania
- Genres: Pop; rap
- Years active: 2015–present
- Members: Kund Filep; Nimród Laskay

USNK is a Hungarian music duo from Romania consisting of Kund Filep and Nimród Laskay. Together they won the eighth season of the Hungarian version of the X Factor. They competed in A Dal 2019, the 2019 edition of the Hungarian national selection for the Eurovision Song Contest, with the song "Posztolj!". They reached the semi-finals before being eliminated.
