= Birth and Rebirth =

1978 album by Max Roach & Anthony Braxton

Studio album by Max Roach & Anthony Braxton
- Released: 1978
- Recorded: September 7, 1978
- Studio: Ricordi (Milan)
- Genres: Avant-garde jazz; free jazz
- Length: 43:24
- Label: Black Saint
- Producer: Giacomo Pellicciotti

Max Roach chronology
Confirmation (1978)	Birth and Rebirth (1978)	M'Boom (1979)

Anthony Braxton chronology
For Four Orchestras (1978)	Birth and Rebirth (1979)	Alto Saxophone Improvisations 1979 (1979)

Birth and Rebirth is an album by the American jazz musicians Max Roach and Anthony Braxton. It was recorded in a single session in Milan on September 7, 1978, and released later that year on the Italian Black Saint label.

== Reception ==
The AllMusic review by Scott Yanow stated: "Braxton (who performs on alto, soprano, sopranino and clarinet) and Roach continually inspire each other, which is probably why they would record a second set the following year. Stimulating avant-garde music."

DownBeat gave the album 5 stars. Reviewer Michael Zipkin wrote, "If ever there was a jazz marriage made in heaven, this is the one. In an absolutely dynamic and feet-on-the-ground, head-in-the-clouds tour de force of intuitive improvisation..."

Professional ratings
Review scores
Source	Rating
AllMusic	4.5/5 stars
The Penguin Guide to Jazz Recordings	4/4 stars
The Rolling Stone Jazz Record Guide	3/5 stars
DownBeat	5/5 stars

== Track listing ==
All compositions by Max Roach and Anthony Braxton

1. "Birth" - 9:40
2. "Magic and Music" - 6:36
3. "Tropical Forest" - 5:05
4. "Dance Griot" - 5:06
5. "Spirit Possession" - 6:44
6. "Soft Shoe" - 2:57
7. "Rebirth" - 7:16

== Personnel ==
- Anthony Braxton - alto saxophone, soprano saxophone, sopranino saxophone, clarinet
- Max Roach - drums
