= Kekko Fornarelli =

Italian jazz pianist and composer

- Genres: Crossover Jazz, Soundtracks
- Occupations: Musician, composer, pianist
- Instruments: piano, keyboards, samples
- Years active: 2005-present
- Labels: Eskape, Abeat Records, Auand Records, Wide Sound
- Website: www.kekkofornarellimusic.com

Kekko Fornarelli, pseudonym of Francesco Fornarelli (born 10 January 1978 in Bari, Italy) is an Italian jazz pianist and composer of crossover jazz music and soundtracks.

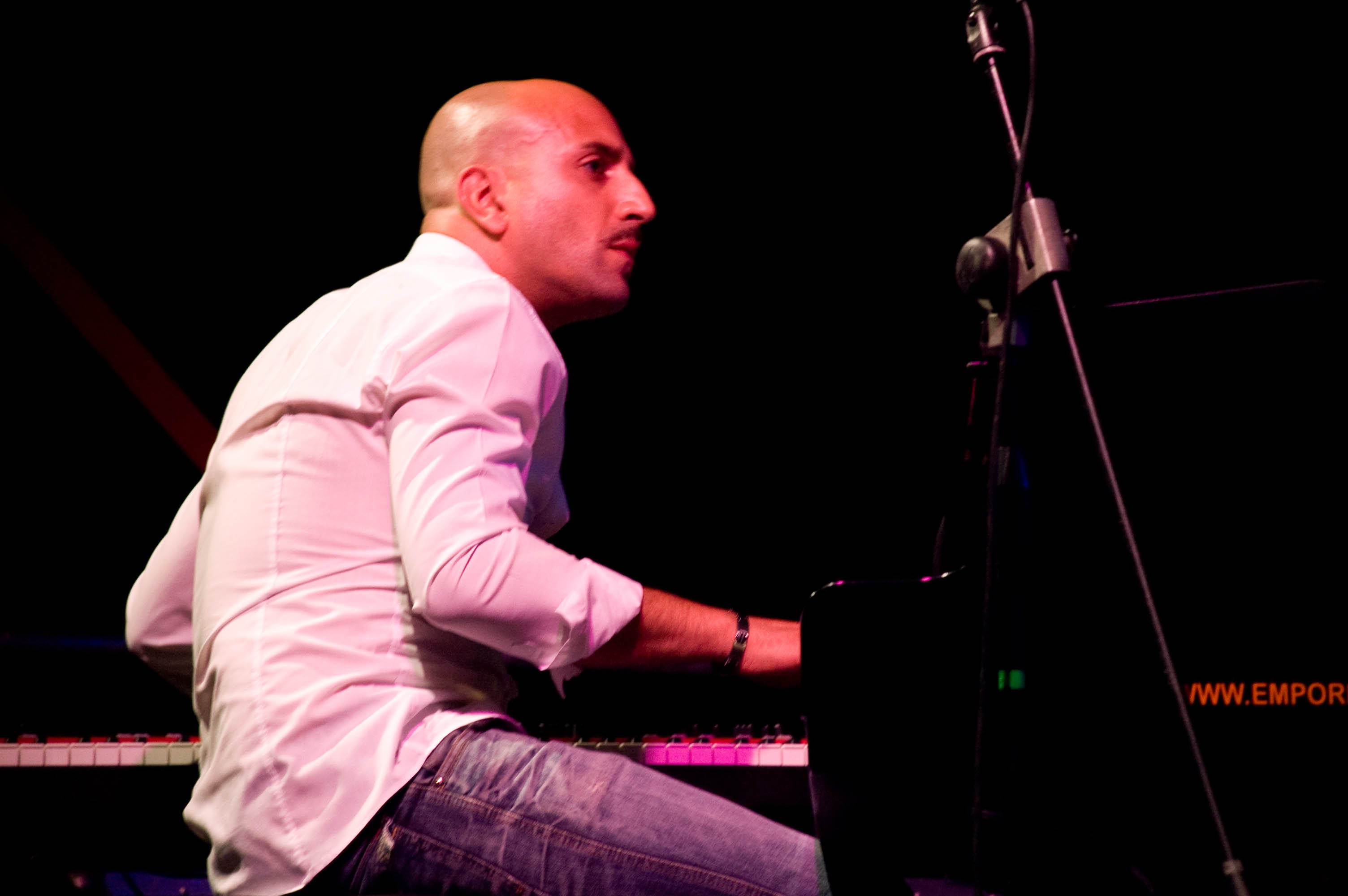

== Biography ==
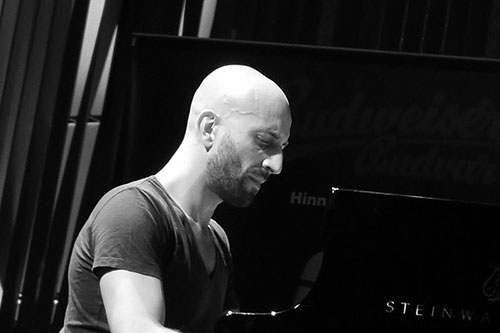
Kekko Fornarelli At Reykjavik Jazz Festival 2015

Kekko Fornarelli began playing the piano at just three years old.

He has recorded eight albums as leader, Circular Thought in 2005, A French Man in New York (2008), inspired by French pianist Michel Petrucciani in the three years he spent in France, Room of Mirrors (2011), Outrush (2014), Abaton (2018), Anthropocene (2021), and Naked (2023).

He also recorded 3 albums as co-author, Mar Endins (2013, with Catalan singer-songwriter Ruso Sala), Matter of Time (2018, with Roberto Cherillo and their band Shine), L'Ospite - The Original Soundtrack (2022, with Giuseppe Bassi).

Kekko Fornarelli has performed in numerous international jazz festivals and clubs, playing in more than 60 countries.

In addition to his work as a musician, Kekko Fornarelli is also a composer of film soundtracks.

=== Other notes: ===
Room of mirrors was released in 2011 by Auand Records. Alison Bentley writes "I can't stop listening to the CD: a fusion of Romantic classical music, modern jazz and 21st century dance rhythms, played with Italian brio from the heart." His last work, "Outrush" was released in 2014.

"Fornarelli is a skilful instrumentalist with classical roots and a subtle improviser's mind". Alison Gunn of the Financial Times writes "A near-perfect balance of tension and freedom. Fornarelli's music has a pared-down yet catchy style that draws on his classical roots, with influences from pop to trip-hop to gospel"

== Discography ==
as leader

- 2023 Naked (Eskape)
- 2021 Anthropocene (Eskape)
- 2018 Abaton (Eskape)
- 2014 Outrush (Abeat Records)
- 2011 Room of Mirrors (Auand Records)
- 2008 A French Man in New York (Wide Sounds)
- 2005 Circular Thought (Wide Sounds)

as co-author

- 2022 L’Ospite, The Original Soundtrack // Kekko Fornarelli and Giuseppe Bassi (Eskape)
- 2018 Matter of Time // Shine (Eskape)
- 2013 Mar Endins // Rusò Sala & Kekko Fornarelli Trio (Fresh Sound)

== Film Soundtracks ==
Awards

- 2024 - Premio Rota (Italia), for the original soundtrack of the film Gli Agnelli Possono Pascolare in Pace, by Beppe Cino

Original Soundtracks

- 2024 - Gli Agnelli Possono Pascolare in Pace, film by Beppe Cino (Draka Production)
- 2024 - Pattini e Acciaio, documentary film by Rossella De Venuto (Interlinea Film)
- 2022 - L’Ospite, documentary film by Domenico Magno (Pharos Film Company)

Participation to other soundtracks

- 2022 - Padre Pio, film by Abel Ferrara (Maze Pictures, Rimsky Productions, Interlinea Film, Carte Blanche Film)
