= Lee Blair (musician) =

American jazz musician

Lee L. Blair (October 10, 1903, Savannah, Georgia – October 15, 1966, New York City) was an American jazz banjoist and guitarist.

Blair was a left-handed autodidact on banjo, aside from a few lessons taken from Mike Pingitore, the banjoist for Paul Whiteman. He played and recorded in NYC with Thomas Morris's Seven Hot Babies in 1926, played with Charlie Skeete in 1926-28, then played and recorded with Jelly Roll Morton's Red Hot Peppers in 1928-30. He played with Billy Kato in 1930-31, then played and recorded with Luis Russell (1934–35) and Louis Armstrong (1935-40). He worked part-time in music through the 1940s, then joined Wilbur De Paris's New New Orleans Jazz Band in the 1950s at Jimmy Ryan's Club on West 52nd Street in New York City. In the summer of 1957 he toured in Africa with the DeParis band for the State Department. In the 1960s he played less, concentrating on raising chickens on his farm in Belmore, Long Island, but appeared at the 1964 World's Fair in a trio with Danny Barker and Eddie Gibbs and freelanced around New York with Hank Duncan and others until he died. He never recorded as a leader, but appears on record with Morris, Morton, Russell, Armstrong, and De Paris, as well as with Dick Cary, Pee Wee Erwin, and Leonard Gaskin among others. He is honored in the jazz section of the Georgia Music Hall of Fame in Macon, GA.
