= Rozina Pátkai =

Hungarian singer (born 1978)

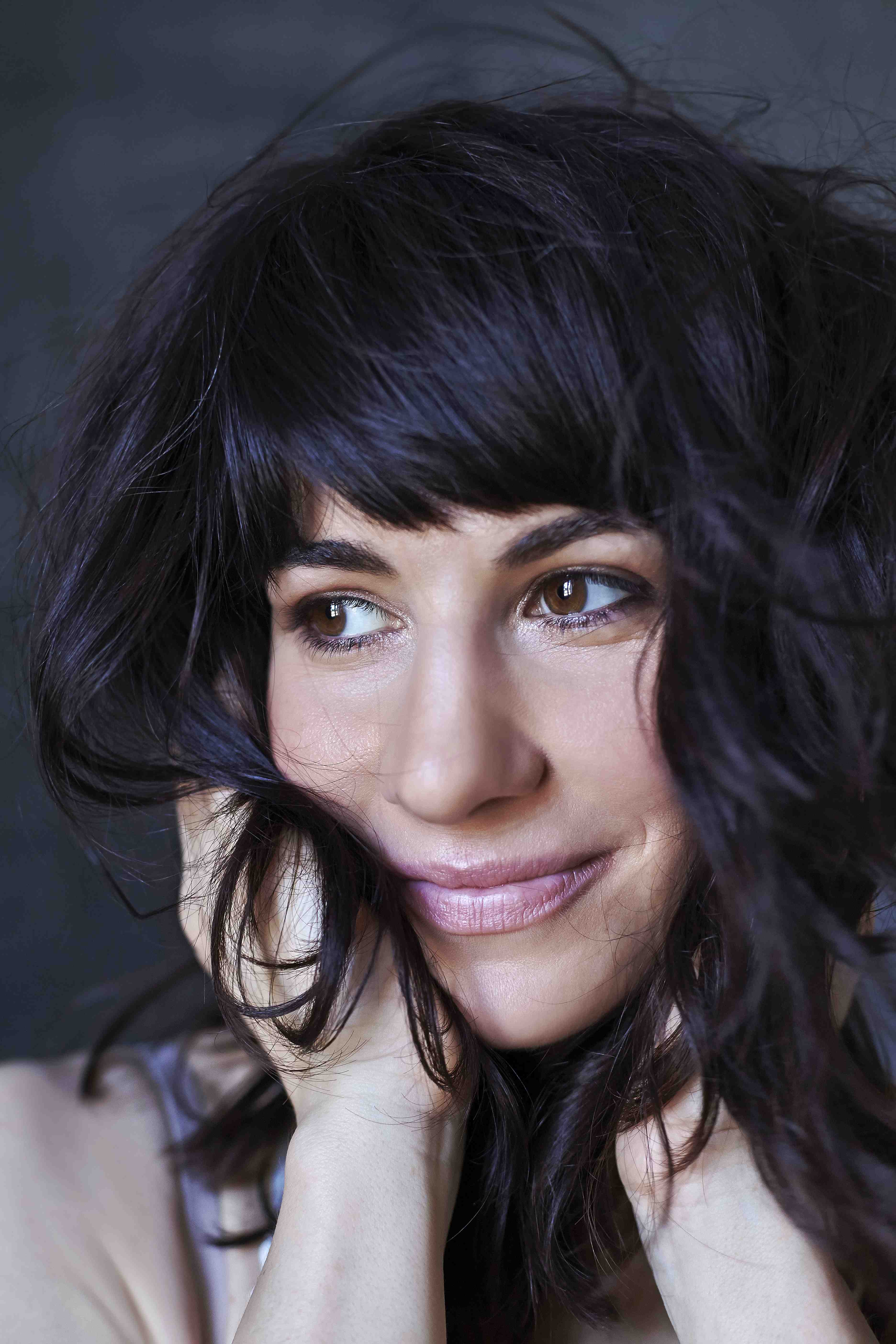
- photo by Norbert Zsólyomi

Background information
- Born: Eszter Rozina Pátkai; 1 November 1978 (age 47); Budapest, Hungary
- Genres: Jazz, bossa nova, electronic music, experimental music, poetry
- Occupations: interdisciplinary artist, singer, composer, performer, sound artist, activist, intermedia artist, educator
- Website: www.rozinapatkai.com

Rozina Pátkai (born 1 November 1978, Budapest) is a Hungarian singer, songwriter and visual artist. She is a vocal artist who has Italian roots and has come to fore with her band playing bossa nova. They have succeeded in many Hungarian and international competitions. She launched her ’Minka’ projects in 2016, with which the all-round artist turns to fine art and to the meeting point of electronic music and poetry. Her husband is Márton Fenyvesi guitarist, composer and producer and has three children: Kamilla, Panna and Rudolf.

== Career ==
After graduating as teacher of Hungarian and English languages in 2009 she enrolled in the jazz singing degree course of Etűd Music School and Conservatory and further on she has taught prosody there. Besides teaching she was on the go as a journalist. She started her career with classical singing. Rozina Pátkai and her band have been playing in different formations in Hungary since 2010. She has been leading her own jazz band since 2011, with which she earned several international awards and national professional credits. Rozina has been working exclusively as a freelancer performer and composer since 2012. She and the band got the chance to introduce themselves in 2013, at the Jazz Showcase held at the Palace of Arts.

== Selected Exhibitions ==
"The quintet mostly plays bossa nova, focusing on Brazilian melodies, vocal and trumpet harmonies, improvisation, and modern musical elements."

The first album of the band received attention even in the United States; first, they received the People's Voice Award for their title track at the Independent Music Awards, and in 2014, they received the jury award.

She launched her music project ’Minka’ in 2016. In ‘Minka songs’, she plants the classical and contemporary poems set to music by her into electronic musical environment.

Pátkai started her fine arts studies under her first mentor, the sculptor Dezső Mészáros's inspiration, in Théba Art School in 1997. Her first exhibition was held in Budapest in 2001, she documented her trips to London in the pictures. In recent years she makes photos, drawings and artwork, presented under the name ’Minka’. ’Minka drawings’ were displayed in Budapest Jazz Club in 2016, the exhibition was opened by the writer Zsófia Bán. In 2017, her further works were displayed in Debrecen, Noszvaj, Makó and at Night of Artefacts in Art Collectors’ House. She is a student of Intermedia Art programme at Hungarian University of Fine Arts.

== Discography ==
- 2011: "Bossa Novas" (Pátkai Rozina - Tóth Mátyás duo)
- 2013: "Vocé e Eu"
- 2015: "Samba Chuva" EP
- 2016: "Paraíso na Terra"
- 2018: "Taladim"
- 2019: "EM90 - Erdély Miklós: Rossz szórend" (Poems by Miklós Erdély)
- 2021: "Minka" (Poems by the poets of Nyugat)
- 2021: "Tilos csillagon - Pilinszky János versei" (Poems by János Pilinszky)
- 2023: "Jelen idő - Petőfi Sándor versei" (Poems by Sándor Petőfi)
- 2023: "{23} - Egy pont között a legrövidebb út" (Poems by Dezső Tandori)

== Soundtracks and Film Appearances ==
- 2020: "Quanto Mais" featured in the Hungarian romantic comedy *HAB* (Cream), directed by Nóra Lakos.
- 2022: "Partokon" featured in an action sequence of the CBS series *FBI* on April 26, 2022.
- 2023: "Hát így" featured in the Hungarian short film *Sárkánykor* (Age of the Dragon), directed by Marcell Farkas, premiered at the Friss Hús XII. Budapest International Short Film Festival.
- 2023: Radioplay "Györgyi," addressing Holocaust and personal history issues, premiered on Klubrádió in Hungary.

== Awards and honors ==
- 2011 Budapest Festival Fringe, Jury's Award, Hungary
- 2011: Edinburgh Festival Fringe, Sell-out Show Laurel
- 2012: Jazz Voices, Klaipeda, Lithuania
- 2012: EuropaFest Jazz Combo Competition finalist, Bucharest, Romania
- 2012: Veszprém Music Festival, Public Prize, Hungary
- 2013: Jazz Showcase, Palace of Arts, Budapest, Hungary
- 2013: Independent Music Awards, People's Voice Award in Jazz Song Category, U.S.
- 2014 Made in New York Jazz Competition, Solo Vocal Top 5 (U.S.)
- 2014 Winner, Best Vocal Jazz Song, Independent Music Awards (U.S.)
- 2014: Independent Music Awards, Best Vocal Jazz Song, U.S.
- 2014: Independent Music Awards nominee in Jazz Song, Latin Album, Jazz with Vocals categories, U.S.
- 2015: Independent Music Awards, Best Latin Song, U.S.
- 2016: Glamour Woman of the Year Nomination, Best Singer
- 2018 Independent Music Awards (U.S.), Best Jazz Album with Vocals
- 2018: Fonogram nominee for Best Jazz Album or Recording in Hungary for "Paraíso na Terra"
- 2019: Independent Music Awards, Best Album Concept for "Taladim," U.S.
- 2022: Crossover Awards Nominee at Music Hungary Szövetség
- 2024: Innovation Awards Nominee at Music Hungary Szövetség

== Workshops and Teaching ==
Rozina Pátkai has conducted a variety of workshops and lectures focusing on songwriting, audiovisuals, and creative re-enactment at several esteemed institutions. Notable sessions include:

- "How to See Sound?" Re-enactment workshop co-facilitated with Negin Rezaie.

MUMOK, Museum of Modern Art, Vienna, 2024.

- "Poetry and Music: Poems in a New Voice" Masterclass exploring the process of setting poetry to music, covering versification, text interpretation, musical adaptation, and production, DEX Songwriting Expo, Budapest, Hungary, 2024
- "Music That I See" Guest lecture on visualizing music, MDW – University of Music and Performing Arts, Vienna, 2023.
- "Collective Resistance Memories: Exploring the Unarchivable Through Multisensory Dialogues" Re-enactment workshop co-facilitated with Negin Rezaie. Angewandte, University of Applied Arts, Vienna, 2024.
- "Lyric Crafting: Enhancing Creativity with Songwriting Techniques" Workshop designed to empower participants to become songwriters by providing accessible tools and creative insights, Poets of Today Voices of Tomorrow, Bratislava, Slovakia, 2023.
- "Poetry and Songwriting – Queer Democracy" Workshop featuring songs from Dezső Tandori's poetry, Budapest Spring Festival, 2023.
- MediaLab Songwriting and Vocal Training Workshops Series of workshops in English and Hungarian organized by KultPult, Loffice, Vienna.

== Other works and coproductions ==
- PECA band, guest vocalist
- Bin-Jip (band), guest vocalist & songwriter

== Rozina Pátkai on the internet ==
- Official site
- Jazz lexicon
- Rozina Pátkai's channel on YouTube
