= Antal Pusztai =

Hungarian guitarist (born 1978)

Tony Pusztai
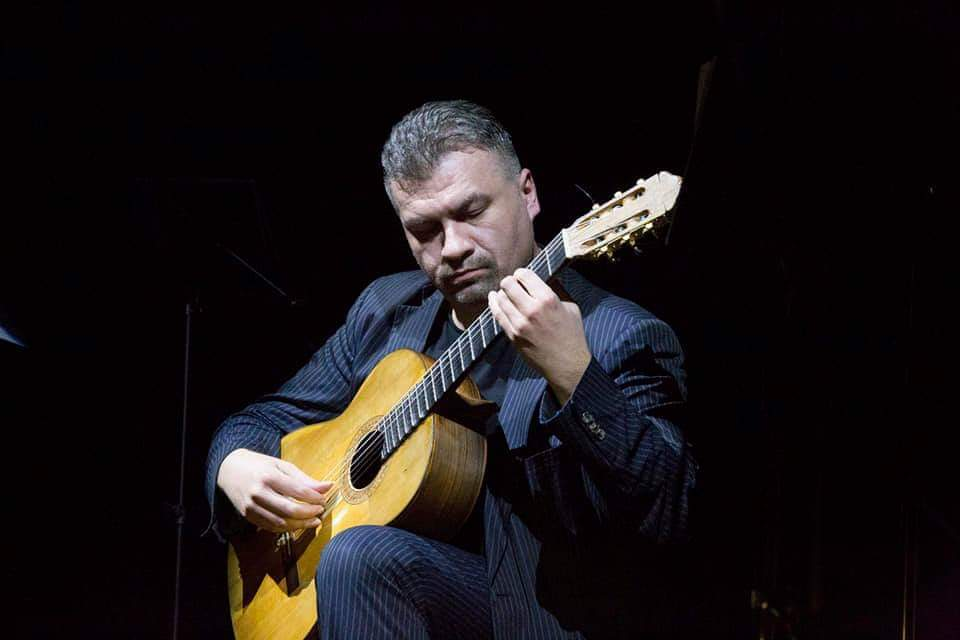
- Pusztai holding a guitar

Background information
- Born: 7 May 1978 (age 47); Győr, Hungary
- Genres: Classical guitar, jazz fusion, jazz, Latin
- Occupation: Guitarist
- Instruments: Guitar, electric guitar
- Years active: 1998–present

Antal "Tony" Pusztai (born 7 May 1978) is a classical guitarist known for producing jazz music.

== Biography ==
Pusztai was born in Győr, Hungary on 7 May 1978. He learned to play guitar from his father when he was seven and later studied under Professor Ede Roth at the Győr conservatorium. From 2005 to 2009, he was taught by Professor Álvaro Pierri at the University of Music and Performing Arts in Vienna.

Between 1998 and 2014, Pusztai won 15 guitar competitions across Europe and the United States. These include the Herbert von Karajan Music Competition in Vienna, the Montreux Jazz Guitar Competition in 2004, the European Guitar Award in Dresden in 2006, and the Lee Ritenour Six String Theory Competition in Los Angeles in 2014. He performed with many well-known soloists and orchestras such as Erwin Schrott, Dalibor Karvay, Ralph Towner, Rosenberg Trio, Al di Meola, Pat Metheny, Lee Ritenour, and the Jánoska Ensemble.

Pusztai recorded his first solo album, Beyond My Dreams, in Hungary in 2000 followed by Wonderland in 2007 under Wildner Records. In 2015, he was featured on the Grammy-nominated album A Twist of Rit by Lee Ritenour. From 2017 to 2021, he was the guitarist of the band Fortissimo. In September 2021, Pusztai established a quintet bearing his name with members from Fortissimo.

== Discography ==
- Beyond My Dreams (2000)
- Wonderland (Wildner, 2007)

== Awards ==
- 1998: International Guitar Competition in Kutna Hora, Czech Republic: 1st place
- 1999: Yamaha International Guitar Competition, Vienna – Austria: 1st place
- 2000: 'Attila Zoller' International Guitar Competition, Budapest – Hungary: 1st place
- 2001: Radio Music Awards – Hungary
- 2002: Baross Gábor Award – Hungary
- 2003: Herbert von Karajan Scholarship – Austria
- 2004: Montreux Jazz Guitar Competition – Switzerland: 1st place
- 2005: International Guitar Competition, Weikersheim – Germany: 1st place
- 2006: European Guitar Competition, Dresden – Germany: 1st place
- 2014: Lee Ritenour's Six String Theory Competition – Grand Price Winner
