= John Ouwerx =

Belgian pianist, conductor and composer

John Ouwerx (8 March 1903 – 13 January 1983) was a Belgian jazz pianist and composer who in 1927 played the first European performance of George Gershwin's Rhapsody in Blue.

Classically trained at the Royal Conservatory of Ghent, he travelled to New York in 1923, establishing himself as a jazz musician on his return.
