= Coppieters =

Coppieters is a surname. Notable people with the surname include:

- Bernice Coppieters (born 1970), Belgian ballet dancer
- Émile Coppieters (1849–1922), Belgian politician
- Fernand Coppieters (1905–1981), Belgian jazz and light music keyboardist
- Francis Coppieters (1930–1990), Belgian jazz pianist
- Honoré Jozef Coppieters (1874–1947), Belgian prelate
- Luiza Coppieters (born 1979), Brazilian politician, LGBTQ+ activist, and educator
- Maurits Coppieters (1920–2005), Flemish politician, after whom the Coppieters Foundation is named
- Pierre Coppieters (1907–date of death unknown), Belgian swimmer
