= Gus Clark =

Belgian jazz pianist

Gustave De Clercq, better known as Gus Clark (October 21, 1913, Antwerp - April 10, 1979, Antwerp) was a Belgian jazz pianist.

Clark led local dance bands while still in his teens, and also played in the groups of musicians such as Harry Pohl, Maurice Pinto, and Jack Hoedemaeker. In the 1930s he played with his own group in Belgium, including at the Brussels club Le Boeuf sur le Toit; Coleman Hawkins performed with this ensemble. He later set up a new ensemble of all-black musicians in Belgium, which included Lauderic Caton as a sideman. Clark performed with Jean Omer, Jean Robert, and Gus Deloof as a sideman, and continued recording as a leader in the 1940s and 1950s.
