= Dulcy =

Dulcy may refer to:

- A short form of Dulcinea
- Dulcy (play) by George S. Kaufman and Marc Connelly, upon which the subsequent films were based.
- Dulcy (1923 film)
- Dulcy (1940 film)
- Dulcy the Dragon, a dragon in Sonic the Hedgehog
