= Dulcy (play) =

1920 play by George S. Kaufman and Marc Connelly

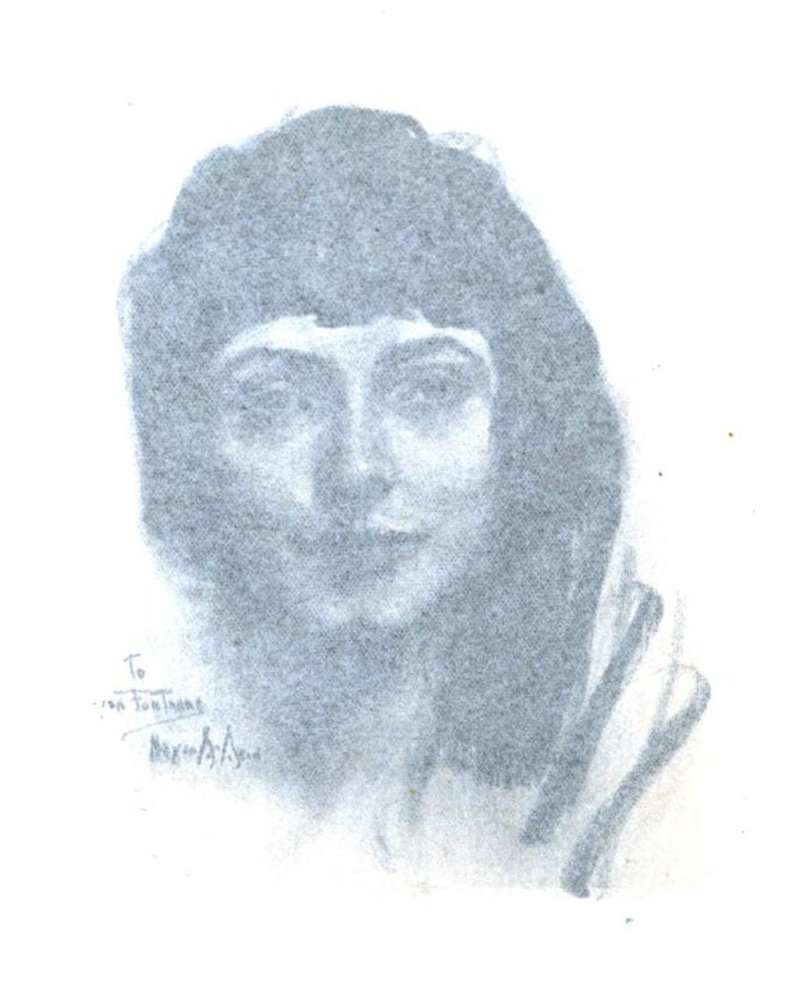
- Lynn Fontanne as Dulcy; By Neysa McMein
- Original language: English
- Written by: George S. Kaufman and Marc Connelly
- Based on: Character created by Franklin P. Adams
- Subject: Charming chatterbox leaves mayhem in her wake
- Genre: Comedy
- Setting: Dulcy's living room, Westchester County, New York.

Premiere
- Date: August 13, 1921
- Place: Frazee Theatre
- Directed by: Howard Lindsay

Dulcy is a 1920 play by George S. Kaufman and Marc Connelly. It is a fast-paced three-act comedy with one setting and eleven characters. The story concerns a warm-hearted and wrong-headed woman who is a compulsive meddler and bromide; she cheerfully arranges other people's lives to their dismay. The action takes place within the living room of a house in Westchester County, New York, from Friday afternoon to Saturday morning. The authors based the play on the character Dulcinea, created by Franklin P. Adams for his newspaper column The Conning Tower.

The play was first produced by George C. Tyler and H. H. Frazee, staged by Howard Lindsay, and starred Lynn Fontanne with Gregory Kelly, John Westley, and Wallis Clark in support. After a tryout in Indianapolis and an opening engagement in Chicago during February 1921, the play made its Broadway premiere in August 1921, and ran through March 1922, for 246 performances.

The play was never revived on Broadway, but did give rise to a 1923 silent film, and a 1940 movie.

== Characters ==
Characters are listed in order of appearance within their scope.

Lead

- Dulcy Parker Smith is a chatterbox who knows what's best for everyone, newly married to Gordon.
- Gordon Smith is Dulcy's husband, owner of a small costume pearl manufacturing concern.
- C. Rogers Forbes, called "Charlie" by his wife, is 53, owner of a large costume jewelry firm, father to Angela.

Supporting

- William Parker, called Bill, is Dulcy's stock broker brother, whom she calls "Willie". (Note: This is a topical reference to actor Gregory Kelly, who created the role. He had earlier starred as William Baxter in Seventeen, in which his character also had a sister that called him "Willie".)
- Angela Forbes is about 20, Forbes daughter, using Sterrett and Leach to pique someone else she has in mind.

Featured

- Henry is the Smith's new butler, a check forger whom Dulcy has persuaded a judge to release to her custody.
- Tom Sterrett is an advertising executive, whose main client is the Forbes business.
- Vincent Leach is a motion picture scenarist, suave and immodest, who fastens on to Angela with Dulcy's encouragement.
- Schuyler Van Dyck is a tycoon in multiple industries, a tall, modest fellow who also plays piano.
- Mrs. Forbes is thirtyish, an amateur scenario writer, the newly married second wife to Forbes.
- Blair Patterson is an attorney with distressing news about one of the Smiths' guests.

== Synopsis ==
The humor of the play is lost in the summary, for it consists of Dulcy speaking in bromides while her brother Bill offers dry counterpoint. Gordon Smith is contemplating joining a combine Forbes is proposing, yielding his factory in exchange for 16% of the shares in the new firm. Smith has invited Forbes to spend the weekend to discuss business, while Bill Parker has invited himself to his sister's house.

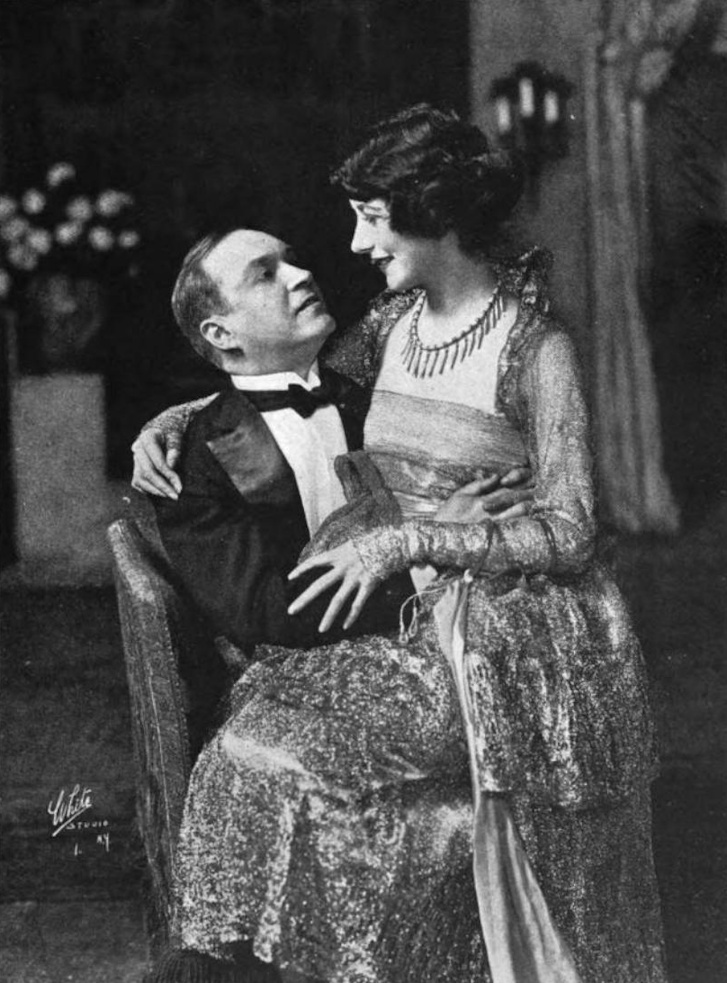

Act I (The Smith's living room, in Westchester County, New York. Friday afternoon.) Bill Parker is there when Gordon Smith comes in from his commute. Henry informs them Dulcy is at a social event. They warily discuss Dulcy's new reform project: Henry. Tom Sterrett has arrived to see Mr. Forbes, while Van Dyck and Leach join the living room party, each having been invited by Dulcy. Sterrett and Leach are both interested in Angela Forbes, with Mr. Forbes taking Sterrett's part and Dulcy in favor of Leach. Angela disdains Sterrett for his preoccupation with business. Dulcy traps Forbes into agreeing to play golf with Van Dyck the next morning, and into riding horseback in the afternoon. She also tells Forbes that her husband has many business interests to manage, hoping to get him to increase his offer of 16%. However, Forbes reacts by telling Gordon his offer was predicated on a full-time commitment to the combine, and so may be lowered. Gordon tries to remonstrate with Dulcy about mixing in his business affairs, but as she sits in his lap can only admit how much he adores her. Dulcy then encouarges Leach to take Angela around the garden, while setting Van Dyck at Mrs. Forbes, since she writes scenarios and he owns film interests. She traps Forbes, Gordon, and Sterrett into playing bridge with her, after displaying an inadequate knowledge of the game. (Curtain)

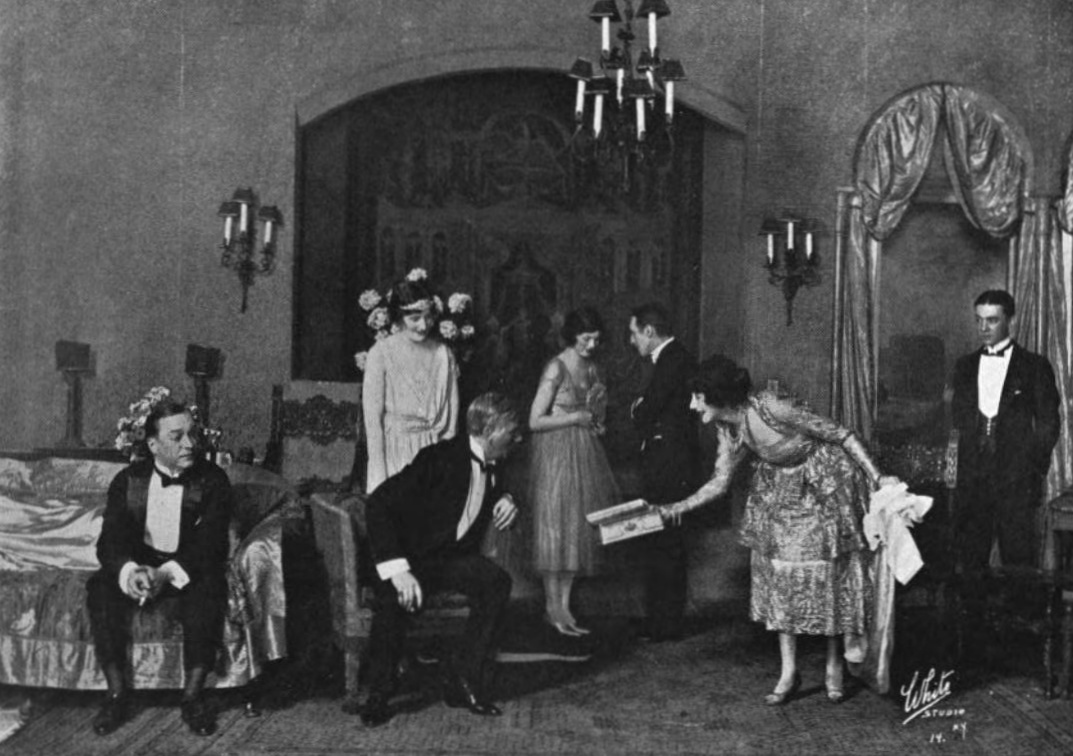

Act II (Same, Friday evening, after dinner.) Forbes is delighted when Dulcy suggests he play billiards with Gordon, only to find she has misplaced the balls. Forbes is increasingly uncomfortable about Van Dyck and Mrs. Forbes, while Sterrett has given up on getting Angela alone. Bill plays the piano in a desultory manner, until Dulcy shoos him away in favor of Van Dyck. She then encourages Leach to talk about his latest work. Leach begins to recite his scenario for Sin, accompanied by Van Dyck on piano. (Three second curtain, to signal passage of thirty minutes.) Leach finishes his scenario recitation as Forbes fumes over his pursuit of Angela. Van Dyck suggests to Gordon that he provide financing to save and expand Gordon's business. Thus encouraged, Gordon tells Forbes he'll reject the combine offer. Dulcy encourages Leach and Angela to elope, and recruits Mrs. Forbes to bring Angela's luggage to the car. Bill offers to drive the couple to a minister, confounding Leach who was hoping to avoid formalities, while Angela is amused. Blair Patterson is brought in by Henry. Patterson informs an aghast Gordon that Van Dyck is really his cousin Hoarce Patterson, who has a mild eccentricity for impersonating the millionaire Van Dyck. (Curtain)

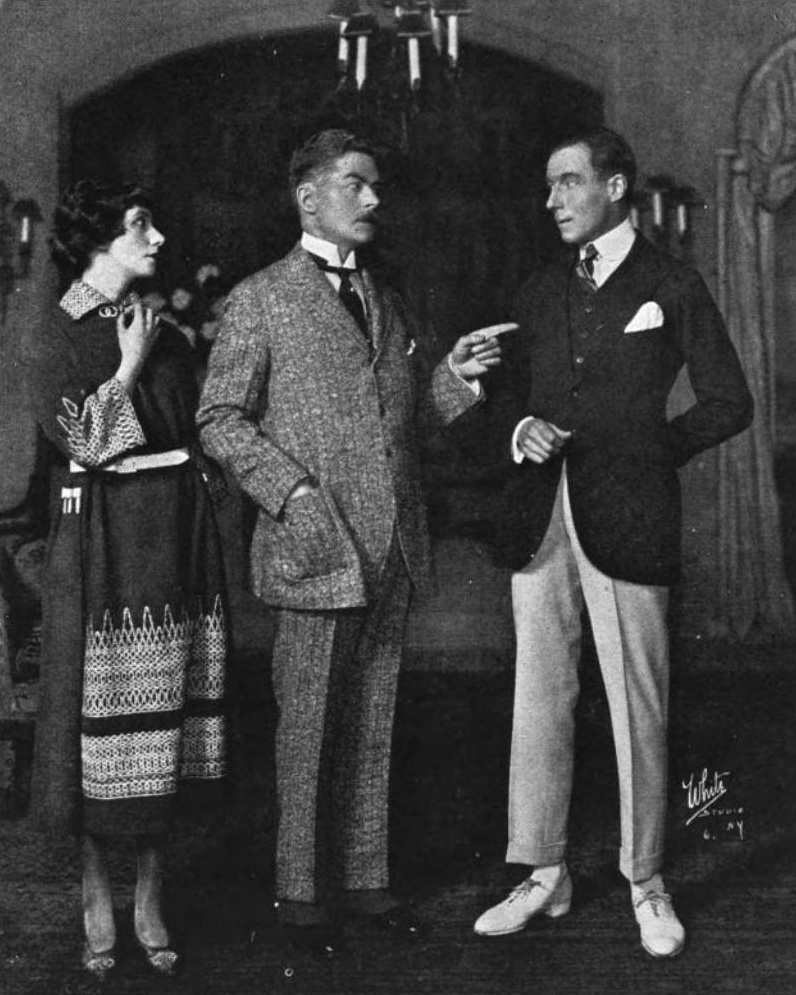

Act III (Same, Saturday morning.) Dulcy is subdued, as Gordon gently scolds her for interfering with business. She tearfully promises to try harder but immediately jumps in to offer Forbes a car so he can leave. Dulcy accidentally implicates Mrs. Forbes in the elopement, souring Mr. Forbes, who dreads having a "celluoid son-in-law". Gordon is surprised that Forbes still believes in the Van Dyck offer. Forbes knows Blair Patterson represents the Van Dyck interests, but does not realize Hoarce Patterson is not Van Dyck. Patterson tries to hustle Hoarce away, but is unable to stop him offering to finance Sterrett in his own ad agency. Overhearing this, Forbes is more convinced than ever of the genuine nature of Van Dyck's proposition to Gordon. Meanwhile, Angela and Bill come in; they are now married, Leech having been decoyed out of the car and abandoned on the road just after they left last night. Forbes is so relieved, he offers Gordon 25% of the new combine shares to turn down Van Dyck. Gordon and Dulcy are reconciled. (Curtain)

== Original production ==
=== Background ===
Dulcinea was a fictional bromide, created by newspaper columnist Franklin P. Adams for use in his column The Conning Tower, which ran in the New-York Tribune. His contribution was acknowledged in programs and on the title page of the published play, and more substantially with 10% of the author royalties.

Producer George C. Tyler had given drama critic George S. Kaufman his start in playwriting, with an assignment to add a part for Lynn Fontanne in the play called Someone in the House, by Larry Evans and Walter Percival. Kaufman, who had been Adams' protege, gave Fontanne's character a personality based on Dulcinea. The play had a short run, but Tyler was impressed by Kaufman's work. He asked Kaufman to write an entire play for Fontanne. Kaufman was willing, but wanted Marc Connelly as collaborator. Tyler agreed, but when the play was ready, he was unable to find a bookable theater in New York or Chicago. H. H. Frazee was persuaded to stage it at his Cort Theatre in Chicago and Frazee Theatre in New York, for 50% of Tyler's interest in the play.

Tyler and Frazee announced the play on January 10, 1921, with an initial presentation scheduled for Chicago during February; New York performances would be in the following season. By January 19, 1921, casting was completed and rehearsals scheduled to begin January 24, 1921.

=== Cast ===
Principal cast during the tryout, opening engagement, and the Broadway run. The production was on hiatus from May 8 to August 12, 1921.
Role	Actor	Dates	Notes and sources
Dulcy Smith	Lynn Fontanne	Feb 14, 1921 - Mar 11, 1922	
Gordon Smith	John Westley	Feb 14, 1921 - Oct 29, 1921	Westley left to direct and play the male lead in The Straw by Eugene O'Neill.
Gordon Smith	Reginald Mason	Oct 31, 1921 - Nov 19, 1922	
Gordon Smith	John Westley	Nov 21, 1921 - Mar 11, 1922	Westley returned to his former role. (Note: Westley, who had staged The Straw and was to play the male lead, abruptly resigned from the cast, causing its opening to be delayed. Otto Kruger took his place. Both Dulcy and The Straw were produced by George C. Tyler. The latter play closed after just two weeks, on November 26, 1921.)
C. Rogers Forbes	Wallis Clark	Feb 14, 1921 - Mar 11, 1922	
William Parker	Gregory Kelly	Feb 14, 1921 - Mar 31, 1921	Kelly left to run his own summer stock company in Indianapolis.
William Parker	TBD	Apr 01, 1921 - May 7, 1921	
William Parker	Gregory Kelly	Aug 13, 1921 - Mar 11, 1922	
Angela Forbes	Norma Lee	Feb 14, 1921 - Mar 11, 1922	
Henry	Harry Lillford	Feb 14, 1921 - Mar 11, 1922	
Tom Sterrett	Elliott Nugent	Feb 14, 1921 - Mar 11, 1922	
Vincent Leach	Howard Lindsay	Feb 14, 1921 - Mar 11, 1922	Besides his own performance, Lindsay also staged the play for the producers.
Schuyler Van Dyck	Gilbert Douglas	Feb 14, 1921 - Mar 11, 1922	
Mrs. Forbes	Constance Pelissier	Feb 14, 1921 - Mar 11, 1922	
Blair Patterson	George Alison	Feb 14, 1921 - Mar 11, 1922	

=== Tryout and opening engagement ===
The play had a week-long tryout in Indianapolis at English's Opera House, starting February 14, 1921. Immensely popular in Indianapolis because of Seventeen, Gregory Kelly was forced to make many curtain calls at the opening, which the theatre manager had designated "Gregory Kelly Night". It was a trying situation for Lynn Fontanne, who was the star.

The production opened at the Cort Theatre in Chicago on February 20, 1921. Percy Hammond at the Chicago Tribune wrote "Lynn Fontanne is an impish beauty with the gift of disguising the broadest of fun in a veil of subtlety". He was also impressed with Howard Lindsay as the scenario writer Leach, calling his recitation of the scenario for Sin "one of the funniest of the season's episodes". The performances of John Westley, Gregory Kelly, Wallis Clark, and Elliott Nugent all received commendation.

So nervous were the authors at the opening night in a big city sans the tryout, that they paced the lobby and the outside street. Tyler said he could see it was a success after the second act, "but Kaufman and Connelly, poor innocents, suffered right on-- lord, how they did suffer!" Tyler later had Kaufman write up a description of their agony, which he did in the character of Connelly. (Note: The humor in Kaufman's article is far more accessible to the modern reader than that of the play.) Tyler sent it to Percy Hammond as a Sunday story, but Hammond "pinched it outright and ran it under his own name", as "The Pessimistic Playwrights".

The play had a three months run in Chicago, closing on May 7, 1921.

=== Broadway premiere and reception ===
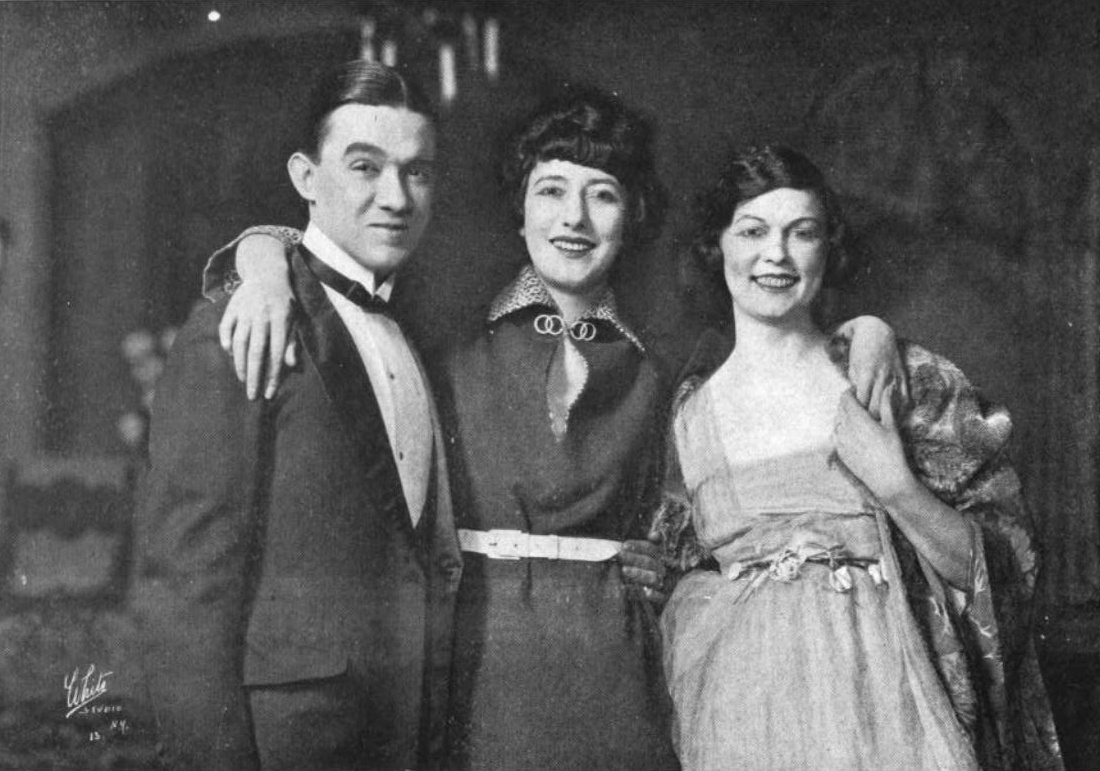

Dulcy had its Broadway premiere at the Frazee Theatre on August 13, 1921. Fontanne "reduces the impersonation of Dulcinea to a consummate art", while Kelly delivers the most commonplace lines in subtle ways, according to McElliott in the Daily News. Arthur Pollock in The Brooklyn Daily Eagle disagreed, saying Kelly was "ineffective by virtue of trying to be too effective", and that Kelly and Fontanne "have quite terrible voices". The critic for The New York Herald thought the play "proved fresh and diverting" and showed "a promising talent for stage-writing". They identified Lynn Fontanne's performance as the source of the play's success: "she had all the indispensable nervousness and fidgets, the unending volubility and air of complete confidence" to portray the bromide.

Bide Dudley in The Evening World confidently predicted "Dulcy will positively prove one of the biggest hits of the new season". He reported there were dozens of curtain calls at the premiere, and "genuine applause born of sheer delight." Two months after the premiere, Elliott Nugent, who played Tom Sterrett, and Norma Lee, who played Angela Forbes, were married in the Notre Dame chapel. They had met at the first rehearsal for Dulcy, which was the first Broadway performance for either of them. Dulcy reached its 100th performance on Broadway on November 8, 1921. In December, Lynn Fontanne announced her engagement to Alfred Lunt, who was then playing opposite Billie Burke in The Intimate Strangers.

=== Broadway closing ===
Dulcy closed on Broadway at the Frazee Theater on March 11, 1922, after 246 performances, then crossed the East River to start touring in Brooklyn.

== Adaptations ==
=== Film ===
- Dulcy (1923 film)
- Dulcy (1940 film)

== Bibliography ==
- George S. Kaufman and Marc Connelly. Dulcy: A Comedy in Three Acts. G. P. Putnam's Sons, The Knickerbocker Press, 1921.
- George C. Tyler and J. C. Furnas. Whatever Goes Up. Bobbs Merrill, 1934.
- Ruth Gorden. My Side: The Autobiography of Ruth Gordon. Harper & Row, 1976. ISBN 0-06-011618-8.
