= Fud Candrix =

Belgian musician and bandleader (1908–1974)

Alfons "Fud" Candrix (July 17, 1908, Tongeren – April 11, 1974, Brussels) was a Belgian jazz saxophonist and violinist.

Candrix got his start in his brother Jeff Candrix's orchestra, which toured western Europe and Morocco. He founded his own group, the Carolina Stomp Chasers, in 1929, which played in France and Italy, and soon after worked with Bernard Etté, Robert De Kers, Jean Omer, and Chas Remue. He also played and composed with Gus Deloof. He continued playing throughout Belgium in the 1930s with his own ensemble and recorded under his own name into the 1950s, in addition to playing as a sideman with Aimé Barelli, Django Reinhardt, and Hubert Rostaing.
