= Fernand Coppieters =

Fernand Coppieters (March 3, 1905, Brussels – September 9, 1981, Brussels) was a Belgian jazz and light music keyboardist. Primarily known as a pianist and organist, he also occasionally played accordion, saxophone, and violin. He was the father of Francis Coppieters.

Coppieters's first professional work was with the ensemble Bistrouille ADO (1920-1921). Following this, he played in the Red Mills Ragtime Band and the Rhythmic Novelty Dance Orchestra, then left Belgium to play in Fud Candrix's ensemble in France and Holland. Returning to Brussels in 1929, he played in a trio with René Compère and again with Candrix. Soon after this, he joined the 16 Baker Boys, led by Robert de Kers and, later, Oscar Aleman. In the early 1930s, he accompanied Josephine Baker on tours of Europe, then worked with Roland Dorsay, Candrix once again, and Willie Lewis. In the 1940s and 1950s, he recorded as a leader and worked as a house pianist for Radio Schaerbeek, an independent Belgian radio station. In the late 1950s and 1960s, he recorded several albums on the Hammond organ, for Fontana Records and Philips Records.

His wife was Berthe Coppi, who recorded as a singer in the 1920s.
