= Rudy Bruder =

Belgian jazz pianist (born 1914)

René "Rudy" Bruder (born 15 June 1914, date of death unknown) was a Belgian jazz pianist. He was born in Brussels.

Bruder's father was a bandleader in his own right, and Rudy played in his father's group in the mid-1930s. He then joined Jean Omer's group, accompanying visiting American musicians such as Benny Carter, Bill Coleman, Coleman Hawkins, and Bobby Martin; he worked with Omer through the early 1940s. He also recorded several times with Jean Robert and Gus Deloof. He led his own band, which recorded in the early 1940s and again in 1946.
