= Not So Dumb =

1930 film by King Vidor

- Directed by: King Vidor
- Written by: Wanda Tuchock; Edwin Justus Mayer; Lucille Newmark
- Based on: Dulcy; 1921 play by George S. Kaufman; Marc Connelly
- Produced by: Marion Davies; King Vidor
- Starring: Marion Davies; Elliott Nugent; Raymond Hackett
- Cinematography: Oliver T. Marsh
- Edited by: Blanche Sewell
- Production companies: Metro-Goldwyn-Mayer; Cosmopolitan Productions
- Distributed by: Metro-Goldwyn-Mayer
- Release date: January 17, 1930
- Running time: 76 minutes
- Country: United States
- Language: English

Not So Dumb is a 1930 American pre-Code comedy film directed by King Vidor, starring Marion Davies, and produced by Cosmopolitan Productions for Metro-Goldwyn-Mayer, who released it on January 17, 1930.

It is based on the stage play Dulcy by George S. Kaufman and Marc Connelly that starred Lynn Fontanne. The film resulted in a financial loss for the studio of $39,000.

The play was previously adapted into a silent film in 1923 and would be adapted again in 1940.

== Plot ==
Not So Dumb (1930)

Dulcinea Parker goes to the train station to meet the Forbes: mother Eleanor, father Charles, and daughter Angela, whom she has invited to spend the weekend. We are also introduced to her new butler Perkins, who is an ex-convict on parole.

Dulcinea, ever the "dumb blonde", has a habit of doing the wrong thing. She misquotes common expressions and butchers the King's English. She and her brother Bill, whom she calls Willie, who's in love with Angela, host the Forbes and several other guests for the weekend. Dulcinea is scheming to get Mr. Forbes to invest in her fiance' Gordon's costume jewelry business.

She plays matchmaker to Angela by pairing her with the flamboyant "scenario writer" Vincent Leach, who enthusiastically tells his latest story for over two hours. Dulcinea's matchmaking efforts are fruitful, and Angela plans to elope with Vincent. Willie, still carrying a torch for Angela, offers to drive the clandestine couple to their wedding. Later, only Angela & Willie return, married.

Dulcinea also entertains a golf enthusiast, Schuyler Van Dyke, who offers to fund Gordon's enterprise (and shamelessly flirts with Mrs. Forbes). Emboldened, Gordon tells off Mr. Forbes. All is well until a man named Patterson arrives; the brother of "Van Dyke", who apparently has delusions of grandeur. Realizing that Gordon's funding is a fantasy, panic ensues. But, since Mr. Forbes recognizes Mr. Patterson as the real Schuyler Van Dyke's attorney, he doesn't believe Van Dyke's a fake. So, fortunately for all, Mr. Forbes outbids Van Dyke's investment, thus making Dulcinea an accidental hero and a not-so-dumb blonde.

== Cast ==
- Marion Davies as Dulcinea Parker
- Elliott Nugent as Gordon Smith
- Raymond Hackett as Willie Parker
- Franklin Pangborn as Vincent Leach
- Julia Faye as Eleanor Forbes
- William Holden as Charles Roger Forbes
- Donald Ogden Stewart as Skylar Van Dyke/Horace Patterson
- Sally Starr as Angela Forbes
- George Davis as Perkins
- Ruby Lafayette as Grandma (uncredited)
