= Ernst van 't Hoff =

Dutch jazz and entertainment musician

Ernst van 't Hoff (13 July 1908 – 17 May 1955) was a Dutch jazz pianist and bandleader.

Ernst Van 't Hoff was born on 13 July 1908 in Zandvoort, Netherlands.

He played with his own orchestra in the late 1920s, and in 1934 joined Robert De Kers's orchestra. In 1936 he worked with Jean Omer, then played in the dance orchestra of the Algemene Vereniging Radio Omroep under Hans Mossel.

In 1940, after the Netherlands became Nazi-occupied territory, van 't Hoff was ordered to start a big band to play state-approved dance music, but he played some jazz anyway, recording songs such as "Pennsylvania 6-5000" and "In the Mood". He recorded for Deutsche Grammophon and played at the Delphi Palast in Berlin, but in 1942 he was chastened by the Sicherheitsdienst for playing degenerate music. He was repeatedly taken into custody by the Gestapo and eventually, in April 1944, was dismissed from his post and moved back to Belgium.

Once Allied troops had retaken western Europe, he began playing for American servicemen. He disbanded his group in 1946, but formed a new group in 1951, which played in Rotterdam, and another in 1953 which played at the Ancienne Belgique.

He died of a sudden heart attack on 17 May 1955 in Brussels, Belgium.
