= Gus Deloof =

Belgian jazz trumpeter, composer, and arranger

Auguste "Gus" Deloof (September 26, 1909 in Brussels – May 8, 1974 in Brussels) was a Belgian jazz trumpeter, composer, and arranger..

== Career ==
Deloof began playing professionally in 1926 and was a member of the group The Michigans in 1927. He worked in Monte Carlo in 1928–1929 with some of Chas Remue's sidemen, then joined Fud Candrix's Carolina Stomp Chasers. In 1931 he recorded under his own name, with Jean Robert and Jean Omer as sidemen. He also performed with Spike Hughes, Bernard Ette, and Willie Lewis. In 1934, he moved to France to join Ray Ventura's group, where he remained until 1939. He did recording sessions in the late 1930s with Philippe Brun and Quintette du Hot Club de France. Deloof also led his own bands, including extensively on record during World War II and in the early 1950s; his sidemen included David Bee and Rudy Bruder.
