= Ernst Fischer (composer) =

German composer (1900–1975)

Ernst Fischer (10 April 1900 – 10 July 1975) was a German composer of operettas, film music, orchestral suites, songs, and piano works, and is best known for his large scale light music compositions.

Fischer was born in Magdeburg, Germany. From 1916 to 1922, Fischer was a student at the Hoch Conservatory in Frankfurt and the Stern Conservatory in Berlin. In 1926, he became a Berlin silent film organist and author of cinema music. He composed a number of piano solos in the then-popular idiom of novelty piano. He also was an arranger for the works of others, such as Carl Robrecht.

In the 1930s, Fischer became a popular radio composer, whose concert pieces were played by many light orchestras. He became well known to radio listeners from the 1930s to 1960s. Although he wrote numerous piano pieces, perhaps his most famous work is the orchestral suite Südlich der Alpen (South of the Alps). He was also well known as the performer on the Grand Odeon organ; he performed under the name of Marcel Palotti between 1930 and 1937. He died in Locarno, Switzerland, and was buried at Ronco sopra Ascona.
