= René Compère =

René Compère (December 28, 1906 in Brussels – April 24, 1969 in Brussels) was a Belgian jazz trumpeter.

== Career ==
Compère played with Billy Smith's Brussels-based band in 1923 before founding his own ensemble, the New Royal Dance Orchestra. As a member of Smith's group, he met Charles Remue, with whom he worked for several years; Jean Omer also played in Compère's orchestra. He recorded with Fernand Coppieters in 1929, then joined Josephine Baker's backing band for several European tours in the first half of the 1930s. He was hired to play aboard the ship SS Normandie for transatlantic voyages. In 1937 he played at the Paris Exposition with Django Reinhardt, then worked in France with Joe Bouillon and in Belgium with Joe Heyne. During World War II he recorded with Eddie Tower.
