= Pete Chilver =

British jazz guitarist and hotelier (1924–2008)

Peter William Chilver (19 October 1924 – 16 March 2008) was a British jazz guitarist and hotelier. Chilver is credited with having helped establish the electric guitar in Britain, encouraged by Trinidadian guitarist Lauderic Caton.

== Biography ==
Born in Windsor, Berkshire, England, Chilver learned to play the piano as a schoolboy before taking up the guitar. He left school at 16 to work as a draughtsman, but he formed a band to play on weekends at Skindles Hotel near Maidenhead Bridge. He became known as a performer during the Second World War, at first in Maidenhead and Slough, but then also in London with bands including those of Johnny Claes, Teddy Foster, and Jimmy Mesene. During this time Chilver also played with visiting American musicians serving in the military, such as John Lewis, Kenny Clarke, and Art Pepper.

In 1946, Chilver joined Ray Ellington, then Tito Burns, and during 1947 worked with Jack Jackson, George Shearing, and Stéphane Grappelli. By then, Chilver was one of the most prominent British bebop musicians. He played with Ted Heath and Ambrose and as a guest with the Skyrockets accompanied Benny Goodman. In 1949, he was with Ronnie Scott and Johnny Dankworth in Alan Dean's Beboppers.

In 1950, Chilver married Norma Domenico, the sister of Lydia MacDonald (a singer for Ted Heath), and ceased playing professionally. He moved to Scotland in that year and managed a hotel in North Berwick and also a jazz venue and restaurant in Edinburgh. He died in Edinburgh in 2008 at the age of 83.
