= His Bridal Night =

1916 play by Lawrence Rising and Margaret Mayo

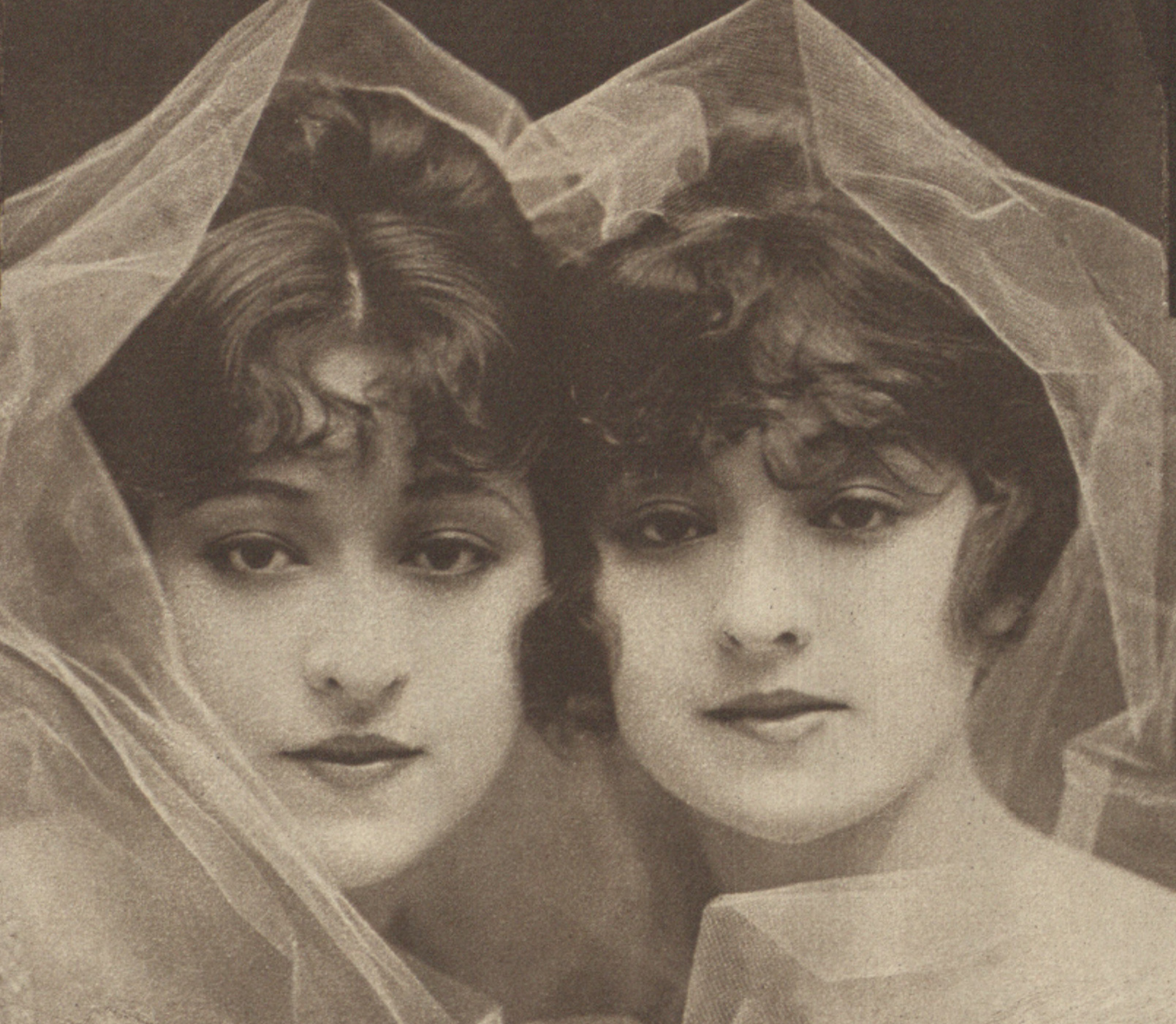
- The Dolly Sisters in His Bridal Night
- Written by: Lawrence Rising and Margaret Mayo
- Original language: English
- Genre: Farce

Premiere
- Date premiered: August 16, 1916
- Place premiered: Theatre Republic

His Bridal Night is a three-act play originally written by Lawrence Rising and significantly revised by Margaret Mayo. Producer A. H. Woods staged it on Broadway in 1916. The play is a farce about a newlywed who is unsure which of two identical twins he has married. The roles of the twins were originally played by the Dolly Sisters, who were popular vaudeville performers, and the play was crafted to make use of their skill as dancers.

== History ==
Rózsika Deutsch (later known as Rose or Rosie) and Janka Deutsch (later known as Yancsi or Jenny) were identical twin sisters born in Hungary in 1892. In 1905 their mother brought them to the United States, where they trained as dancers and began performing in vaudeville shows on the Orpheum Circuit. One of the traveling shows they performed in was an ensemble called The Strolling Players, which was developed by producer A. H. Woods. In 1908 they left Orpheum and moved to the Keith Vaudeville Circuit, which had venues primarily in the eastern US, including New York City. In 1910 producer Lew Fields and theatre owners the Shubert brothers recruited the pair to join the already-successful Broadway show The Midnight Sons. In the following years the sisters continued to be popular on tour and on Broadway, where they appeared in revues such as the Ziegfeld Follies and more traditional musicals such as A Winsome Widow.

In 1915, Woods approached the Dolly Sisters with a proposal for them to star in a production designed specifically for them, where they would have leading roles as actors in addition to performing dance numbers. They were initially reluctant to accept, because while they had danced in many shows, they were not actors and had almost never spoken on stage. Once they agreed, the sisters were coached to minimize their Hungarian accents, and writer Margaret Mayo – a former actress – revised lines that they had difficulty delivering.

After previews at the Apollo Theatre in Atlantic City, the Belasco Theatre in Washington, D.C., and at the Forrest Theatre in Philadelphia, the play premiered at the Theatre Republic on August 16, 1916. It ran for 77 performances and closed on October 21, then went on tour across the United States. For touring companies that did not include the Dolly Sisters, the production was modified to replace their dance routines with musical comedy songs. Frederick V. Bowers, who also acted in one of the companies, wrote the music. Edward Madden and Arthur J. Lamb provided lyrics.

== Cast and characters ==
The characters and cast from the Broadway production are given below:

Opening night cast
Character	Broadway cast
Joe Damorel	John Westley
Lent Trevett	Pedro De Cordoba
Vi (Mrs. Damorel)	Rozsika Dolly
Tiny (Vi's sister)	Yansci Dolly
Julie	Lucile Watson
Sloan (a maid)	Jessie Ralph
Algernon (a butler)	Harry Lillford
Chauffeur	J. Archer Curtis

== Reception ==
Reviews for The New York Clipper and The Washington Post both said the play made an effective vehicle for showcasing the Dolly Sisters' dancing skills.

Based on its premise and title, some reviewers expected the play to be bawdy, but found it less transgressive than other bedroom farces of the era. In Munsey's Magazine, Matthew White Jr. said the play was not particularly risqué, aside from a few lines "which could easily be omitted". In Theatre Magazine, Arthur Hornblow said the play was "calculated at times to bore as much as shock". The Washington Post said the script managed to "glide with ... perfect assurance over dangerously thin ice". The New York Times reviewer, in contrast, thought His Bridal Night went even further onto the "thin ice" than other plays and was therefore "no play for the fastidious".

Several reviewers commented about the story's central conceit of mistaken identity involving identical twins. Drama critic George Jean Nathan challenged several common criticisms of mistaken identity plots, saying they were no more unlikely, unbelievable, or old-fashioned than many other comedic plots, but he criticized the play as an indifferent presentation of the trope.

== Adaptations ==
On July 14, 1919, Select Pictures released a five-reel silent film adaptation, also titled His Bridal Night. Kenneth Webb directed; Alice Brady starred as both twins.
