= Dolly Sisters =

American actresses popular in the early 1920s

Rosie Dolly
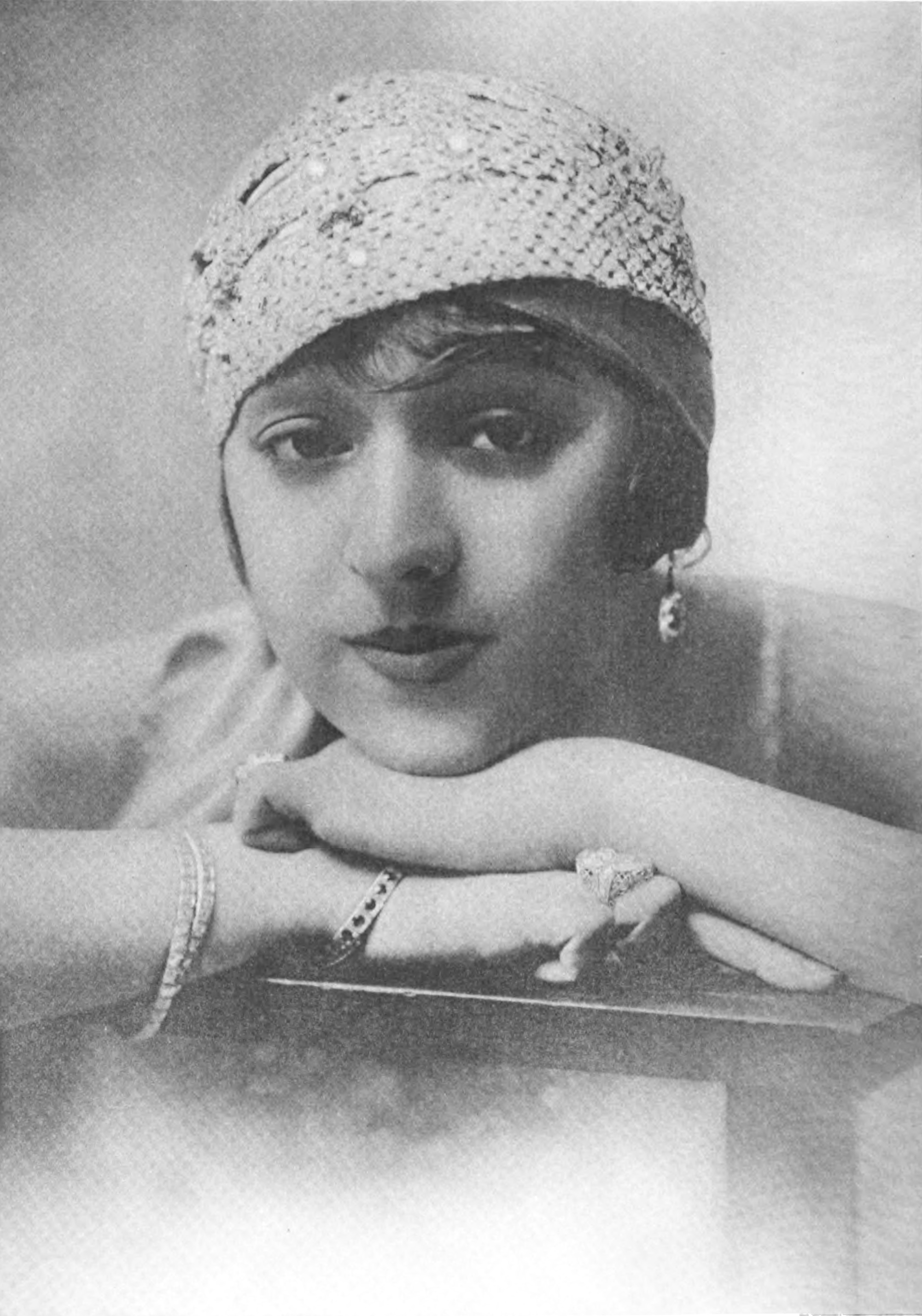
- Rosie in 1915
- Born: Rózsika Deutsch; October 24, 1892; Balassagyarmat, Hungary
- Died: February 1, 1970 (aged 77); New York City, U.S.
- Resting place: Forest Lawn Memorial Park, Glendale
- Occupations: Dancer; actress
- Years active: 1907–1929
- Spouses: Jean Schwartz; (1913–1921); Mortimer Davis, Jr.; (1927–1931); Irving Netcher; (1932–1953; his death)

Jenny Dolly
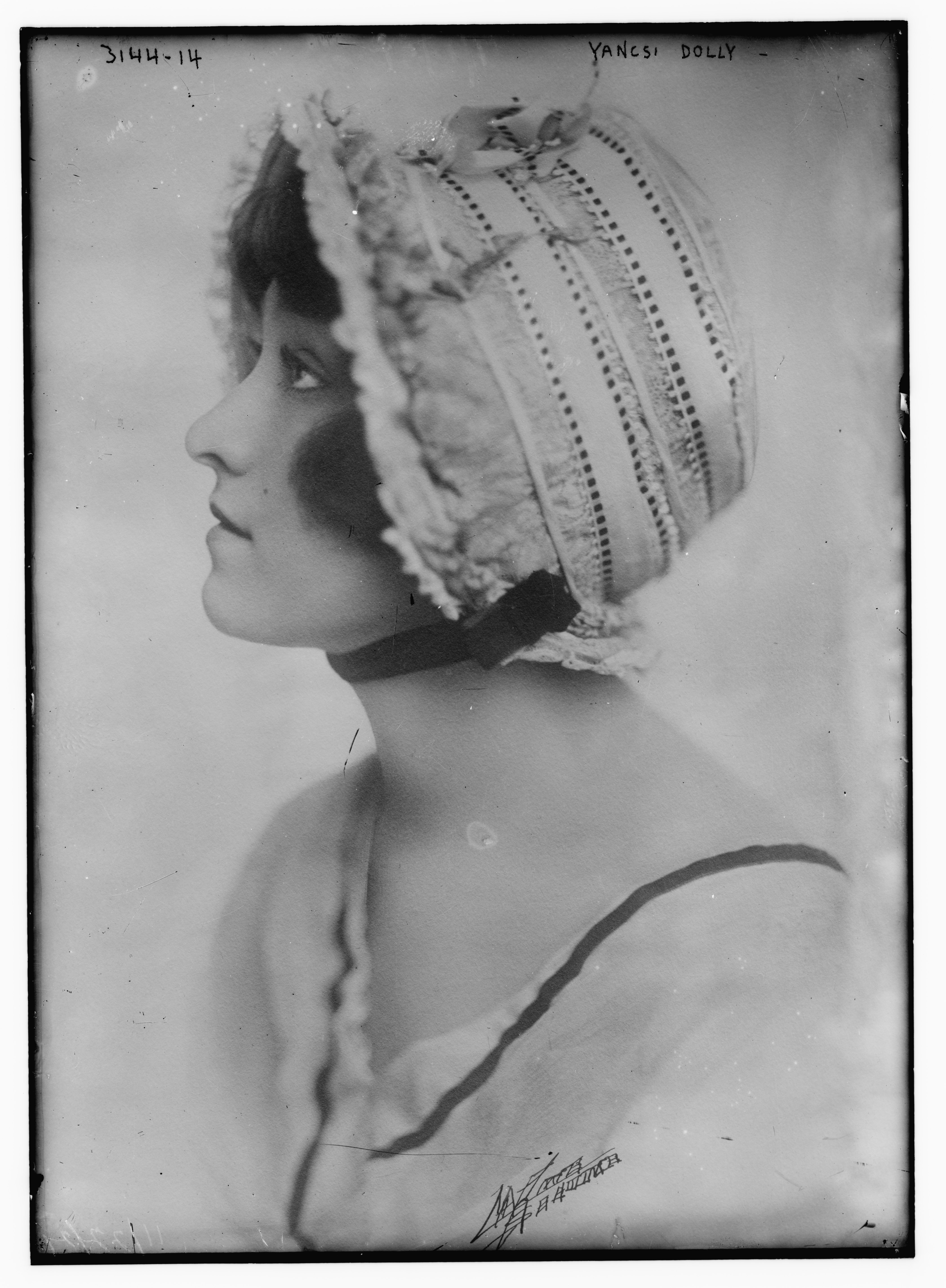
- Jenny, c. 1914
- Born: Janka Deutsch; October 24, 1892; Balassagyarmat, Hungary
- Died: June 1, 1941 (aged 48); Hollywood, California, U.S.
- Cause of death: Suicide by hanging
- Resting place: Forest Lawn Memorial Park, Glendale
- Other names: Jennie Dolly; Yansci Dolly
- Occupations: Dancer; actress
- Years active: 1907–1929
- Spouses: Harry Fox; (1912–1921); Bernard Vinissky; (1935–1941; her death)
- Children: 2

Rosie Dolly (October 24, 1892 – February 1, 1970) and Jenny Dolly (October 24, 1892 – June 1, 1941), known professionally as The Dolly Sisters, were Hungarian-American identical twin dancers, singers and actresses, popular in vaudeville and theatre during the 1910s and '20s. Both sisters also appeared in two silent films.

== Early lives and careers ==
The sisters, Rózsika Deutsch (later known as Rose or Rosie) and Janka Deutsch (later known as Yancsi or Jenny), were born in Balassagyarmat, Hungary. Their parents were Julius (born Gyula Deutsch, c. 1865) and Margaret Deutsch (born Margit Weisz, c. 1874). Julius and son Istvan (later known as Edward, born March 31, 1898) emigrated to the United States in October 1904; the twins and their mother arrived May 1905. As children, the sisters trained as dancers and began earning money in beer halls as early as 1907. Barred for being under age by the New York City stage, they toured the Orpheum Circuit until 1909 when they debuted on the Keith Vaudeville Circuit.

The following year, they appeared in the stage production of The Echo. In 1911, Florenz Ziegfeld, Jr. signed them to appear in his Ziegfeld Follies for two seasons. Their act was a hit with audiences who enjoyed their glamorous personas.

In 1913, the sisters decided to try to forge separate careers. Rosie appeared in The Whirl of the World on stage while Jenny teamed up with dancer Harry Fox (whom she married in 1912) in Honeymoon Express. Jenny and Fox also toured the vaudeville circuit as a dance duo. In 1916, the sisters reunited to act on stage in speaking roles for the first time in the successful Broadway farce His Bridal Night.

Both sisters made their film debuts in 1915: Jenny starred in The Call of the Dance and Rose appeared opposite Lillian Gish in Lily and the Rose (later reissued as The Tiger Lady). The sisters re-teamed in 1916 to appear in Ziegfeld's Midnight Frolic and returned to vaudeville where they commanded $2,000 a week. In 1918, they appeared in their only film together, the semi-autobiographical The Million Dollar Dollies.

After World War I ended, the sisters moved to France where they bought a chateau. They toured the theaters and dance halls of Europe and were courted by numerous wealthy men and royalty including Carol II of Romania, Christian X of Denmark, and Alfonso XIII of Spain. On several occasions, the sisters would team up with male dance partners and sell tickets to the performances on the same night to create rivalry that would boost ticket sales.

As their success continued throughout the early 1920s, they were able to command high salaries. During one engagement at the Moulin Rouge in Paris, the sisters were paid $1,200 a night.

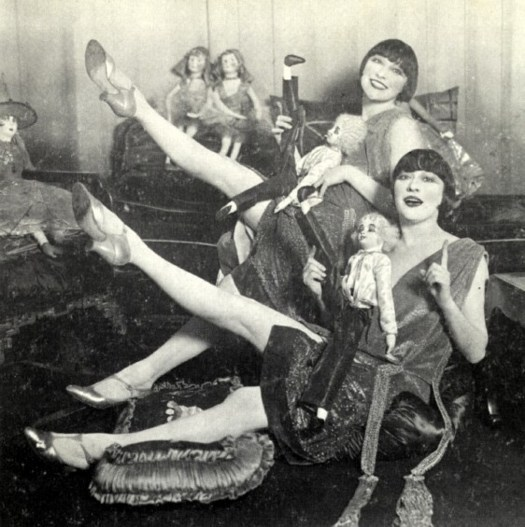

While in Europe, the sisters became well known for gambling excursions at casinos and horse tracks which were usually financed by wealthy admirers. They won $850,000 in one season at Deauville. Of the two, Jenny Dolly became legendary for her winnings. She won 4 million francs one evening in Cannes, which she converted to a collection of jewellery; she then went on to win another $11 million. On other occasions, she won $100,000 at the horse track, $500,000 at baccarat and $200,000 at roulette. With her winnings, Jenny Dolly indulged in her passion – buying expensive jewellery. Jenny's collection of jewellery, which she acquired through her winnings and from numerous suitors, became legendary.

While Jenny was gambling in Cannes one evening, the Viscountess Furness saw her and remarked, "I have never seen so many jewels on any one person in my life. Her bracelets reached almost to her elbows. The necklace she wore must have cost a king's ransom, and the ring on her right hand was the size of an ice cube."

In 1926, the sisters staged a gala benefit concert for the nation of France at the Champs-Élysées theater. Participating artists included Josephine Baker, Harry Pilcer, and bandleader Billy Arnold.

By early 1927, the Dolly Sisters' popularity began to decline. Their highly publicized Paris show A vol d'oiseau, closed after eight weeks. The sisters spent more time gambling than performing and eventually retired by 1929.

== Personal lives ==
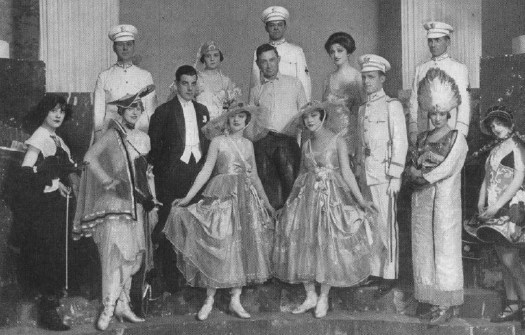
Onstage (center) at the Ziegfeld Follies. Their friend Olive Thomas can be seen just above the leftmost Dolly Sister

The Dolly Sisters' private lives were as melodramatic as their public life was stellar. Rose Dolly was married three times while Jenny Dolly was married twice and had a string of highly publicized affairs with wealthy men. Their reputation for dating wealthy men earned them the nickname "The Million Dollar Dollies".

In 1913, Rosie married songwriter Jean Schwartz. They divorced in 1921. Her second marriage was to Mortimer Davis, Jr., whom she married in 1927. Davis was the son of Mortimer Davis, the president of the Imperial Tobacco Company of Canada Limited. The senior Davis disapproved of the marriage and cut off Davis, Jr. Rosie and Davis divorced in 1931. Rosie's final marriage was to merchant Irving Netcher in 1932. They remained married until Netcher's death in 1953.

Jenny's first marriage was to her dancing partner Harry Fox in 1912. They too divorced in 1921. In 1925, the sisters met retail magnate Harry Gordon Selfridge while they were performing in London. Jenny began an affair with Selfridge (Rosie also reportedly had an affair with him). Selfridge lavished Jenny with expensive gifts and funded both sisters' gambling habit. The Dolly Sisters reportedly gambled approximately $4 million of Selfridge's money away. While she was still involved with Selfridge, Jenny Dolly began seeing French pilot Max Constant. In 1933, Selfridge offered Jenny $10 million to marry him.

=== Accident ===
Before she gave Selfridge an answer, she decided to go on one last holiday with Constant. While the two were returning to Paris, Constant crashed the sports car in which they were traveling near Bordeaux. Jenny sustained serious injuries (her stomach had been displaced into her lung chamber) that required dozens of operations and plastic surgeries to reconstruct her face.

To pay her medical expenses, Jenny sold off a portion of her jewellery collection. After the majority of Jenny's financial earnings were wiped out, Selfridge paid for Jenny's medical treatments although the two never married.

== Later years and deaths ==
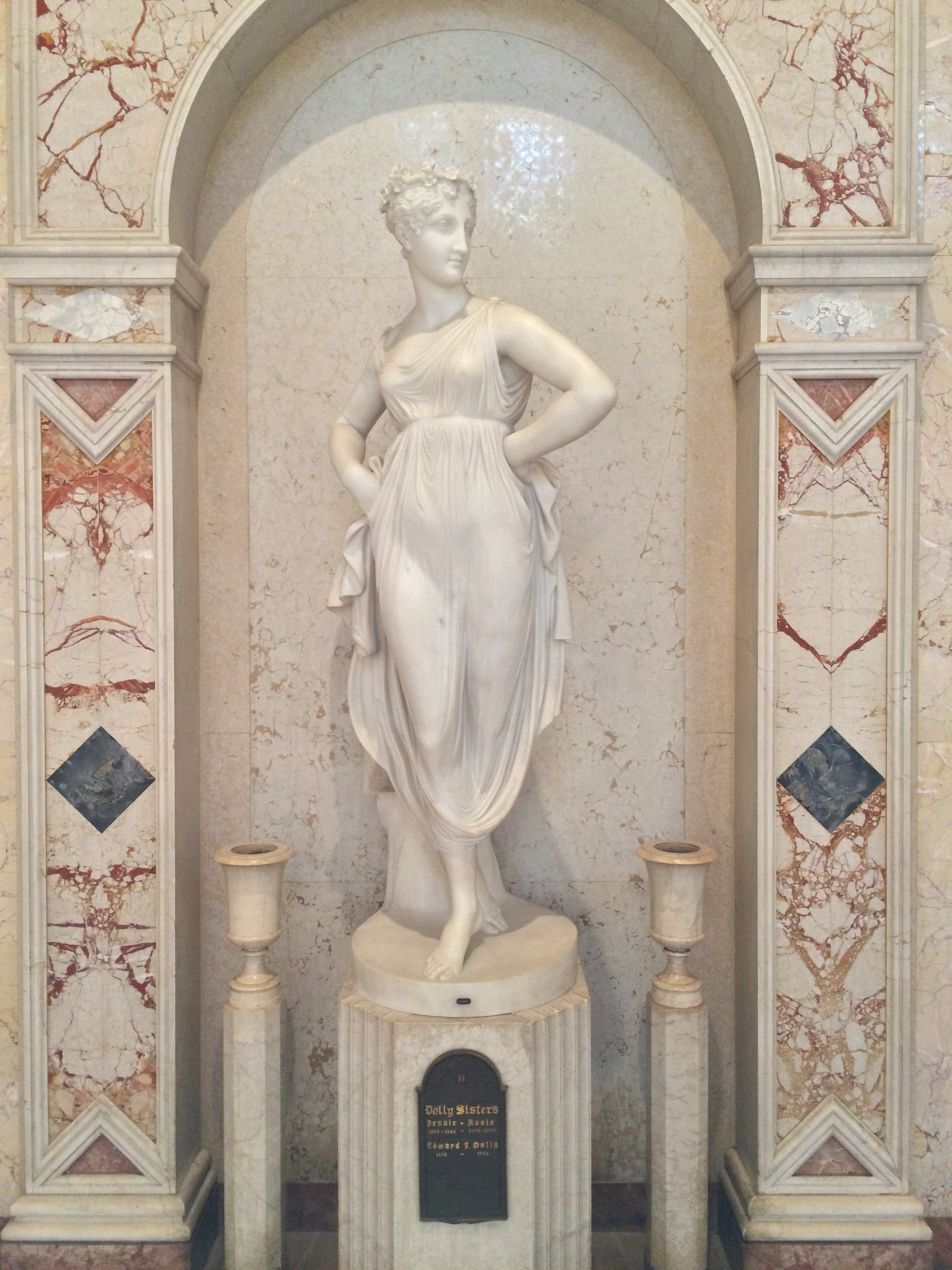
Grave of Jenny and Rosie, "The Dolly Sisters", in the Great Mausoleum at Forest Lawn Memorial Park, Glendale, California.

After the car accident, Jenny Dolly developed depression. Her depression increased when she was forced to sell the remainder of her jewellery at auction in 1936. After living abroad for nine years, Jenny returned to the United States when her sister invited Jenny to live with her and her husband, Irving Netcher, in Chicago. There, Jenny met Bernard Vinissky, a wealthy lawyer; the two were married on June 29, 1935.

Vinissky later adopted the two Hungarian orphans, Klári (1924–2013) and Manczi (1925–1985), whom Jenny had adopted in 1929. The marriage did little to alleviate Jenny's depression, however, and the couple separated. Jenny took an apartment in Hollywood with her two daughters. On June 1, 1941, she hanged herself from a curtain rod in their apartment.

In the years following their retirement and her sister's death, Rosie Dolly retreated from public life. With no children of her own, she spent her remaining years doing charitable work for children in her native Hungary. In 1962, Rosie, too, attempted suicide. On February 1, 1970, she died of a heart attack in New York City at the age of 77.

The bodies of both sisters are interred in the Great Mausoleum at Forest Lawn Memorial Park, Glendale, California.

== Dolly Sisters filmography ==
Year	Title	Role	Notes
1914	Our Mutual Girl	Themselves	episode 28
1914	Our Mutual Girl, No. 28	Themselves	Short film
1916	Hearst-International News Pictorial, No. 67	Themselves (as The Dolly Sisters)	Short film
1916	Hearst-International News Pictorial, No. 70	Themselves (as Rozsika Dolly and Tansci Dolly)	Short film
1918	The Million Dollar Dollies	Themselves (as Rozsika Dolly and Tansci Dolly)	Short film

== Rosie Dolly filmography ==
=== Film ===
Year	Title	Role	Note
1915	The Lily and the Rose	Rose (as Rozsika Dolly)	Short film
1915	Dance Creations	Self (as Rozsika Dolly)	Short film

=== Television ===
Year	Title	Role	Notes
1958	Person to Person	Herself	episode #6.5

== Jenny Dolly filmography ==
Year	Title	Role	Notes
1915	The Call of the Dance	Natalie Hall - a Child of the Slums (as Yancsi Dolly)	Short film

== Cultural references ==
In 1945, 20th Century Fox released the sanitized biographical film The Dolly Sisters. June Haver portrayed Rosie, and Betty Grable portrayed Jenny.

The exploits of the Dolly sisters and their respective relationships with Harry Selfridge are chronicled on the TV series Mr Selfridge. It was indicated the expression 'dolly birds' arose from this period.
