= Peter Packay =

Belgian jazz composer and trumpet player

Pierre Paquet, better known as Peter Packay (August 8, 1904, Brussels - December 26, 1965, Westende) was a Belgian jazz trumpeter, arranger, and composer.

== Life and career ==
Packay lived with his family in China for part of his childhood, but returned to Belgium in 1912. As a teenager, he was crippled in one arm by an accident, but decided to learn to play trumpet anyway at age 20, joining the Varsity Ramblers. He cofounded a band called Red Beans with David Bee and served as its principal composer of originals; Bee left the group and was replaced by Robert De Kers, and Packay remained its leader until its dissolution in 1929. In the 1930s he formed another group, Packay's Swing Academy, which played with Coleman Hawkins among others. He also did arrangements for bandleader Billy Arnold.

As a composer, Packay's works included "Alabama Mamma", "The Blue Duke", "Dixie Melody", and "Lullaby for a Mexican Alligator". Following World War II he gave up performance to concentrate on composition and arrangement: among others "Jazz in the Rain", "One Day" and "Grey Skys".
