= Lauderic Caton =

Trinidadian guitarist (1910–1999)

- Also known as: Lawrence Rix
- Born: Lauderic Rex Caton; 31 August 1910; Arima, Trinidad and Tobago
- Died: 19 February 1999 (aged 88) London, England
- Genres: Jazz
- Occupation: Musician
- Instrument: Guitar

Lauderic Caton (31 August 1910 – 19 February 1999) was a Trinidadian guitarist who settled in Britain in 1940. He was an early proponent of the use of electric guitar in Britain, particularly in jazz music. According to Val Wilmer, "he exercised a significant influence on Pete Chilver and Dave Goldberg, the two jazz guitarists more generally credited as British pioneers of the amplified instrument, while his students, official and unofficial, ranged from jazz exponents to the Nigerian highlife specialist Ambrose Campbell and Hank Marvin of the Shadows."

== Biography ==
Born on 31 August 1910, in Arima, Trinidad and Tobago, Lauderic Rex Caton was the fourth son and last among the eight children of Robert Caton, who was of Saint Lucia descent, and Margaret Caton.

Caton was an autodidact on guitar, which he played professionally from the age of 17. He was also proficient on saxophone, double bass, and banjo. After spending time in Guadeloupe and Martinique, he moved to Europe in 1938, playing in Paris, with guitarist Oscar Alemán and then in Brussels with Ram Ramirez, Jean Omer, Harry Pohl, and Jamaican Joe Smith. While in Antwerp, Caton played with Gus Clark and Tommy Brookins.

Influenced by Lonnie Johnson and Charlie Christian, Caton first began using an amplifier in May 1940. He played in England with Don Marino Barreto (in whose band he met and befriended saxophonist Louis Stephenson, a frequent collaborator) and led a house band at Jig's Club. He worked with Cyril Blake, Johnny Claes, Bertie King, Harry Parry, Dick Katz, and Coleridge Goode. Late in the 1940s, Caton played with Ray Ellington and Ray Nance, using the pseudonym "Lawrence Rix" for legal reasons. Later in his life, he also taught and built custom amplifiers.

He left music at the end of the 1950s. Caton was the musical arranger for the film Walking on Air.

Lauderic Caton died in London on 19 February 1999, at the age of 88, and was buried in Port of Spain, Trinidad.
