= John Westley (actor) =

American actor

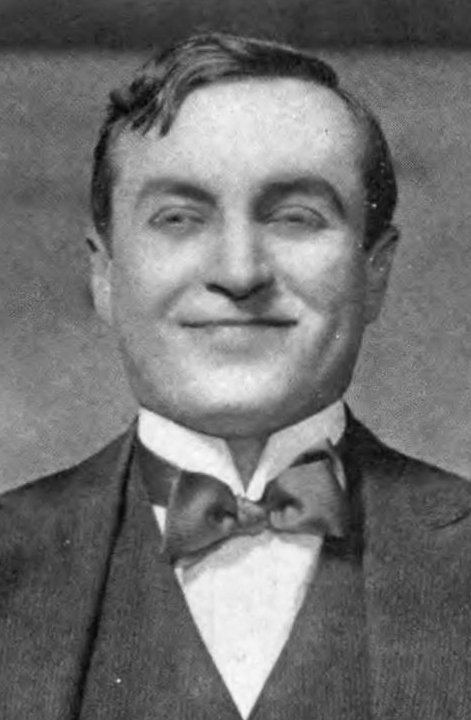
John Westley in 1916

John Westley (November 17, 1878 - December 26, 1948) was an American stage actor. His plays included Dulcy (opposite Lynn Fontanne), 50 Miles From Boston, 45 Minutes From Broadway, Fallen Leaves, His Bridal Night, Twin Beds, and Three of Us. He also did some small movie roles.

Westley was born John Westley Conroy, but later changed his name to John Conroy Westley.

Westley was married to actress Helen Westley. They separated in 1912 and were later divorced. He later married Dorothy Preston King (1890-1952), sister-in-law of Charles Waldron the actor.

Wesley died of a stroke in Hollywood on December 26, 1948, survived by his second wife.
