= Ernest de Regge =

Belgian composer (1901–1958)

- Born: 15 January 1901; Overmere, East Flanders, Belgium
- Died: 15 January 1958 (age 68); Carmody's Hotel, Ennis, County Clare, Ireland
- Occupations: Organist and choir master composer
- Spouse: Hélène Coppieters
- Children: 6
- Parent: Karel De Regge

Ernest de Regge (15 January 1901 – 15 January 1958) was a Flemish musician who made a career in Ennis, Ireland as a cathedral organist and choir master, later also establishing himself as a composer.

He was killed in mid career when an upper floor collapsed at the local hotel where he was attending a furniture auction.

== Life ==
=== Provenance and early years ===
Ernest de Regge was born in Overmere, a small village in the intensively settled countryside between Ghent and Antwerp. His father, Karel De Regge, who was the sacristan-organist at the local church, supported himself as a teacher. The child's musical talent was identified while he was still at primary school, when he and his brother received organ lessons from Jules De Groote, brother to Emile De Groote, the organist at Ghent. Later de Regge received private organ lessons from Emile De Groote himself. In the meantime, he received a conventional secondary schooling in Sint-Niklaas. He then attended the Lemmens Institute in Mechelen, which involved a daily 5-mile (8 km) commute by bicycle to the station at Dendermonde before completing the journey on the train. At the Institute he studied composition, organ and, importantly, Gregorian plainsong, emerging in 1922 with a degree. His marks in the final exams were second only to those of his contemporary Flor Peeters, who also won the organ prize that year. Ernest De Regge won the prize for composition, however.

=== Postwar emigration ===
Great Britain had entered the First World War ostensibly to defend the territorial integrity of Belgium, and across the British isles there had been much sympathy for the Belgian refugees who had arrived between 1914 and 1918. During a period of elevated nationalism across Europe, in the emerging Irish Free State there was also a sense of fellow feeling with Belgium as a victim of a militarily powerful and intrusive neighbour. For a newly qualified professional musician, Ireland shone out as a country with an abundance of well-maintained church and cathedral organs and a shortage of professional musicians, where a Belgian might expect a warm welcome. Accordingly, following his graduation at Mechelen, Ernest de Regge emigrated to Ennis in County Clare. His prospects were enhanced by the excellent reputation of the Lemmens Institute internationally. The bishop gave him a job as a music teacher at St. Flannan's College, a prestigious school with close connections to the seminary. Bishop Michael Fogarty, who according to one source "ruled the diocese of Killaloe from 1904 until his death ... in 1955", would play an important role in de Regge's career and life more generally. With effect from 1923 de Regge was appointed organist and choir master at the cathedral. His appointment should be seen in the context of Bishop Fogarty's determination, in compliance with the 1903 papal initiative "Tra le sollecitudini", to restore the primacy of Gregorian chant in worship.

During the 1920s and 1930s De Regge made frequent returns to Belgium, and he took the opportunity to receive further private tuition in harmony and orchestration with Paul Gilson and Lodewijk Mortelmans. It may be that Gilson provided advice on the piano concerto that De Regge was working on, but Gilson died in 1942 and the work was never completed.

=== Reputational achievements ===
The Ennis cathedral choir had originally been set up in 1859 by another Belgian, Charles Louis Nono. Under De Regge the choir's profile and reputation flourished. At a time when there was only one radio station in the country, the Ennis choir under Ernest de Regge featured in nationally broadcast concerts or masses in 1930, 1933, 1935, 1946, 1947 en 1953. According to one source the first Holy Mass to be broadcast by Raidió Éireann, transmitted on the Feast of the Epiphany as late as 1940, came from Ennis Cathedral. The same source quotes an (unidentified) press review: "...the brilliant success achieved is a tribute to the excellent training provided to the cathedral choir by organist E De Regge".

=== The author ===
In connection with his teaching work, De Regge produced a text book entitled "Theory of Music" which was used in many Irish and English schools. He also published a book entitled "Uraiceacht Ceoil" ("Rudiments of Music", 1953), though it is not immediately clear whether this was the same book in a different language or a different book.

=== The composer ===
Ernest De Regge's most enduring contribution was as a composer. He wrote roughly 300 works, mostly for the organ, piano, chamber ensemble or for mixed choirs. There were songs based on English and Gaelic texts and several settings of the Mass. With the political establishment of the recently launched Irish Free State keen to build national identity, De Regge received commissions from the Ministry of Education and Culture for nationalist-romantic compositions. He spent a number of years adapting old folk songs, complete with Gaelic language commentaries, for use in schools, a project on which he worked in collaboration with the schools inspector and musician Mícheál Ó Siochfhradha, Sister Mary Albeus and fellow teacher Joseph Rogers who taught Irish and later became bishop. He also received a commission from the Irish National Army to compose them a "Corps Song". Many of his best compositions and arrangements have been taken up by "Nan Mulligan's Choir" and broadcast on national radio. Enniscorthy Choral Society and Valda Choir, conducted by Donagh Wylde, have also made recordings of his music.

One high point came in 1950 when De Regge's "Ave Maria" was performed in Rome by the Vatican choir for the Marian Year in 1950. As the reputation of his compositions grew they featured and won prizes at various music festivals and competitions.

=== Money ===
De Regge was appointed to his college and cathedral posts in 1923 for an annual salary of £300. He was still on the same salary in the 1950s which was one of several causes of tension with the bishop. He will have received some additional amounts for giving private music lessons, and in connection with his composition, but his eldest daughter later recalled growing up in a family that was usually short of money. De Regge supplemented his income with various entrepreneurial activities. At different stages he tried chicken breeding, importing cars, managing a jewellery shop in Ennis or a music shop in Limerick. He also traded in antiques, including old pianos which he acquired with the intention of restoring them and selling them on at a profit.

=== Death at Carmody's Hotel ===
Carmody's Hotel in Ennis had a formidable history. It was said that it was here that Charles Stewart Parnell had met Kitty O'Shea for the first time. During the twentieth century Taoiseach de Valera had appeared on the balcony to greet crowds of supporters. But by 1958, with its best days behind it, the time had come to sell off the contents of Carmody's Hotel. An auction lasting for three days was scheduled to take place in the Sarsfield Room on the hotel's second floor (first floor according to British English usage), starting on Wednesday 15 January 1958. It was not an opportunity to miss and Ernest de Regge was one of many who attended the auction hoping for bargains. At 14.35 on the first day of the auction, after the auctioneer had announced the next lot – the hotel linen – but before anyone had the chance to make a bid for it, the floor collapsed, and those who had been in the Sarsfield Room were dropped down fourteen feet into the Commercial Room below it. Emergency services were quickly on the scene, which a contemporary report described as "a seething mass of humanity and debris". Ernest De Regge was one of the eight or nine people killed.

=== Funeral ===
His funeral mass was a grand event at Ennis Cathedral. Despite sometimes frosty relations between De Regge and the bishop, proceedings were conducted by Bishop Joseph Rodgers, the former co-adjutor bishop who had taken charge after the death of Michael Fogarty in October 1955. Among those in the congregation was the Taoiseach, Éamon de Valera. After the mass, the residual solemnity of the occasion faced a challenged when the hearse carrying the coffin from the cathedral to the grave yard on the edge of town broke down and could not be persuaded to start. While larger mourners attempted a "push start" (and failed), the rumour began to spread among mourners at the back of the large procession that the hold-up was somehow linked to the propensity of De Regge's own ancient car to "need a push" at inopportune moments: there was talk of some sort of practical joke in exceptionally poor taste. In the end several of the more robust choir members extracted the coffin from the hearse and Ernest De Regge's poor body completed the final few hundred metres to the burial ground at Drumcliff not in the smooth comfort of an ancient hearse but on the shoulders of his choir.

The family stayed in Ennis for long enough to enable the children to complete their school exams for the year, but by the end of 1958 they had relocated to Belgium.

== Personal ==
It was only on 25 August 1939, during his 37th year, that Ernest de Regge married. His bride was Hélène Coppieters whom he had got to know in the course of his trips back to Belgium. Hélène's family had close connections with the church, and the marriage ceremony was conducted by her uncle, who was the Bishop of Ghent. There was also a celebrity organist in the person of the bridegroom's friend from their student days, Flor Peeters. The marriage was a happy one and resulted in six recorded children.

Bishop Fogarty moved to a new palace around this time and Ernest De Regge was able to live for some years with his bride and rapidly growing family at the bishop's old house. The underlying financial arrangements are not clear, but in 1948 the De Regge family were evicted by the bishop. The family spent several months living in a hotel, and then a small apartment, before finding a more permanent home at 1 Bindon Street. Many years later, De Regge's eldest daughter recalled that the incident had left her parents disillusioned and confused. They had considered moving back to Belgium, but in the end the family remained in Ennis, with Ernest employed by Bishop Fogarty till the old bishop died in October 1955. In her autobiographical memoir of her childhood in Ennis, Ghislaine de Regge provides a carefully calibrated evaluation of Bishop Fogarty: "His tender side the bishop showed to his elegant Irish Wolf Hounds".
