= Jean Robert =

Belgian jazz saxophonist (1908–1981)

- Born: Brussels, Belgium
- Died: February 28, 1981 (aged 72); Hilversum, Netherlands
- Occupation: Musician
- Instrument(s): Piano, tenor saxophone

Jean Robert (June 25, 1908, Brussels - February 28, 1981, Hilversum) was a Belgian jazz saxophonist.

Robert started out on piano before switching to tenor saxophone, and played early in his career with Peter Packay, Gus Deloof, Chas Remue, and Albert Sykes. By 1933 he was leading his own band at a Brussels club called the Atlanta, and also worked with Freddie Beerman and Robert De Kers around the same time. Later in the decade he played in the Netherlands with Freddy Johnson and Jascha Trabsky, and during World War II worked in Jean Omer's band and with Lutz Templin. After the war, he played with Omer into the 1960s. He spent the latter years of his life in Hilversum, in the Netherlands, having retired from active performance; however, he continued to do arrangement and composition work.
