= Jean Omer =

- Born: Nivelles, Belgium
- Died: September 9, 1994 (aged 82); Brussels, Belgium
- Occupation: Musician
- Instrument(s): Clarinet, saxophone

Jean Omer (September 9, 1912, Nivelles – May 30, 1994, Brussels) was a Belgian jazz reedist and bandleader.

Omer played violin before switching to clarinet and saxophone, playing with local groups in Strassburg and Brussels. He worked in France in the band of Billy Smith, then played with the Golden Stars and in René Compère's band. Omer participated in a recording session with Gus Deloof in 1931. Following a tour with Fud Candrix's Carolina Stomp Chasers, he founded his own group, which included at times Lauderic Caton and Jean Robert. He and Robert De Kers accompanied Josephine Baker in the mid-1930s, and played in a group with Ernst van 't Hoff late in the decade. In 1941, he recorded with Rudy Bruder. He settled in Brussels and led a band into the 1960s which played at the club Le Boeuf sur le Toit.
