= The Straw (play) =

The Straw is a three act play written by American playwright Eugene O'Neill in 1919. The play follows lead characters Eileen Carmody and Stephen Murray during their time at Hill Farm Sanatorium. This was the first of many multi-act plays that O'Neill produced and can be considered semi-biographical.

== Summary ==
The Straw is a play about a young lower-class woman named Eileen Carmody who is diagnosed with tuberculosis. She is sent to Hill Farm Sanatorium for treatment and while there meets a patient named Stephen Murray. Stephen Murray is a writer and Eileen helps him pursue his career. While doing so, Eileen falls in love with Stephen Murray and ends her engagement to Fred Nicholls, a man she has known since childhood. Eileen's case of TB gets worse while Murray's case of TB gets better and he is able to leave Hill Farm. Eileen confesses her love and the love is not returned. Months later Murray returns to Hill Farm to find Eileen in worse condition than when he had left. In attempt to make her well, he pretends to love her and wants to marry her. In doing so, he has an epiphany and realizes that he truly does love Eileen.

== Plot ==
=== Act 1 ===
==== Scene 1 ====
It is evening in the Carmody home. The scene opens with Bill Carmody, the father, telling his daughter Mary, that if she doesn't get her head out of the books she will end up sick like Eileen. The doctor, Gaynor, comes downstairs from his session with Eileen and tells Carmody that Eileen has TB, or consumption. Carmody does not believe him and fusses about the cost of a Sanatorium, but ultimately agrees to send Eileen for treatment. Fred Nicholls stops by to see Eileen. After Fred has a conversation with the Gaynor, Eileen comes downstairs. Carmody leaves to get a drink. Eileen and Fred talk about her going to the Sanatorium. The scene ends with Eileen trying to kiss Fred but him turning his head away from her.

==== Scene 2 ====
A week has passed. Now the location is the reception room at Hill Farm Sanatorium. Miss Howard is talking to Murray about how he kids a lot like all newspaper reporters. Murray does not want to talk about his job and says he would rather forget about it. Miss Howard tells Murray about the new patient that is supposed to arrive that day.

The scene switches to Eileen. Eileen introduces herself to Miss Gilpin and then Miss Gilpin shows her to her room. Meanwhile, Carmody makes a scene in the reception room regarding Murray and how books are what gave most people consumption. Carmody then proceeds to try and drink which leads to an argument between him and Fred. Carmody asks Murray to keep an eye on Eileen. Eileen then returns and Carmody introduces her to Murray. Eileen and Fred get into an argument because he believes that she already has an eye for Murray. Fred apologized and tries to kiss her but she turns her head. He storms out of the sanatorium. Eileen starts crying and Murray comforts her. He tells her to stay calm and they chat about TB, babies, and his job. Miss Gilpin interrupts their conversation to remind Eileen to cover her mouth when she coughs. Eileen goes out into the hall. Miss Howard comes in and gives Murray his milk. He jokes about how it is love at first sight with Eileen and proceeds to recite a parody poem about milk.

=== Act 2 ===
==== Scene 1 ====
Four months have passed. The scene opens in the assembly room of the main building at Hill Farm Sanatorium. Doctor Stanton is showing Mr. Sloan and Doctor Simms around the sanatorium. Stanton tells them that a patient can stay at Hill Farm six months and if no improvement they must be sent away to one of the state farms. Stanton continues to show them around when Eileen enters the room. Murray finds her to inform her of him selling one of his stories. Murray kisses Eileen in thanks for her typing his stories for him. Murray informs Eileen that if he gains weight he will be released. We find out that Eileen has been losing weight for 3 consistent weeks. Murray blames Carmody and Fred for Eileen's decline in health. All of the patients line up to be weighed. One by one the patients go up to get weighed. Murray gains weight and Eileen loses weight.

==== Scene 2 ====
It is now midnight of the same day. Eileen and Murray meet at a crossroads near Hill Farm. Eileen tells Murray that she has ended her engagement to Fred Nicholls. Eileen then confesses her love to Murray. The two share multiple kisses. Eileen admits that she knows Murray does not share the same feelings toward her. They depart from the crossroads separately and the next day Murray is released from Hill Farm.

=== Act 3 ===
This act begins four months later in an isolated room and porch at Hill Farm. Eileen's condition has gotten significantly worse. Carmody, Mrs. Brennan (Carmody's new wife), and Mary come to visit her. We learn that Eileen is being taken out of Hill Farm because of her declining health. An argument arises during the visit and they all leave. Mrs. Howard comes in to inform Eileen that Murray is there to visit. Miss Gilpin tells Murray that maybe, if the tells Eileen that he loves her she will improve. Murray does just that and asks Eileen to marry him. She agrees to do so when she is well. While talking about the future Murray realizes that he truly loves Eileen. The play ends with Eileen telling Murray how she must take care of him.

== Analysis ==
In several of Eugene O’Neill's plays, the underlying moral and motivators have been questioned. These theories and ideas often represent what these characters are dealing with inside and out. Dealing with The Straw specifically, there are arguments created in "The Straw as an Unexpressionist Play" on page 77 that say, "Characters O’Neill introduces are intensely penetrated sufferers who are ensnared between two forces: inner self and outside force. To O’Neill this ‘self’ is the end result of the unrelenting ascendancy of both nature and society. Hence, there could be an aura of determinism imminent in his works which ushers his characters to their doom." As readers we can control our preliminary thoughts onto what the outcome for our characters will be, but referring back to "The Straw as an Unexpressionist Play" the ultimate fate is already to be determined by underlying factors. In The Straw, our characters are said to rely on each other because during this time they are all they have, but on page 77 of "The Straw as an Unexpressionist Play," the author adds, "This is not just a veracious in his drama. Indeed, O’Neill's own agitated life assisted him to act as a responsive and tender-hearted companion to traverse with his creations to the heart of the abyss to come up against the demon and stand against it."

== Context ==
Eugene O'Neill is infamous for his novelistic dramas and the difficulty of recreating his stage directions. The directions given throughout his collection of plays have been considered hard to recreate. These stage directions also made it quite difficult for O'Neill to find common ground with the producers who wanted to buy the play. Looking closer at The Straw, O'Neill's objections can be documented in a letter to George C. Tyler, who had begun the process to buy the play. The argument started because of Tyler's commentary about the coughs throughout the play. These details, however, were crucial to O'Neill. O'Neill was actually diagnosed with tuberculosis, the disease that is dealt with heavily in the play, so these seemingly irrelevant details were what really created the reality of the play for O’Neill. O'Neill tells Tyler, "It is a play of the significance of human hope and the T.B. background of the action is as important as the action itself in bringing out my meaning. Secondly: There are only about three coughs in the whole play and not one spit. A careful reading of the script will show you this statement Is true. Thirdly: As I took great care to impress upon Mr. Westley, I regard weighing the scene as one of the very best, technically and artistically, that I have ever written and, outside of a few cuts in the dialogue which may prove necessary, I will not consent to change it." He goes on to tell Tyler that he believes he is not thinking of his play when directing it, but some other play he has created. O'Neill's ends his letter to Tyler with, "I have no hope that it would be produced elsewhere in any immediate future; but I do know that I can get it published in book form, and I would rather have it judged that way than have my whole meaning misinterpreted……..You sincerely think one way about this play. I just as sincerely believe another, and that you are absolutely wrong, root and branch." It is clear that Mr. O'Neill feels passionately about his plays and wants to make sure that they are depicted precisely how he feels they should be, but there have been few to explore this idea. Although the resources dealing with The Straw are scarce, in Eugene O'Neill: A Life in Four Acts by Dowling, it is revealed that Eileen Carmody, the female lead in The Straw, was based on a fellow Irish American patient that O’Neill met during his own time spent in the sanatorium, Catherine Mackay. On page 99 in Eugene O'Neill: A Life in Four Acts, it says, "O’Neill's portrayal of Eileen in his stage directions faithfully describes the actual Mackay: "Her wavy mass of dark hair is parted in the middle and combed low on her forehead, covering her ears, to a knot at the back of her head. The oval of her face is spoiled by a long, rather heavy, Irish jaw contrasting with the delicacy of her other features," and her shape is "slight and undeveloped" (CPI, 729 as cited in Dowling, 2014, p. 99) This can lead us readers to assume that The Straw was constructed in a biographical type of way, thus helping understand O'Neill's desires to maintain his stage directions. Just like Stephen Murray in The Straw, O'Neill also spent a brief time in the sanatorium while suffering from tuberculosis and went through many of the same symptoms as Murray. It can also be noted that O'Neill, before his professional playwriting career, wrote for the newspaper, just like Murray. To solidify the idea that O'Neill was in some ways creating a biographical context, I would like to draw attention to the closing that O'Neill used in a letter to one of his doctors from a sanatorium. Throughout the letter he shares health updates about himself and closes with, "If, as they say, it is sweet to visit the place one was born in, then it will be doubly sweet for me to visit the place I was reborn in – for my second birth was the only one which had my full approval".
