= David Bee =

Belgian jazz composer and jazz player

David Bee, also known as Ernest Craps, Ernie Sparks, and Manuel Travo (October 17, 1903, Brussels - 1992) was a Belgian jazz musician, arranger, and composer.

Bee was a multi-instrumentalist, adept on clarinet, harp, piano, and alto and tenor saxophone. He played with the group Bistrouille ADO during 1924–1925 before co-founding an ensemble with Peter Packay called Red Beans, a group which toured widely throughout Western Europe. After returning to Belgium, he joined Robert De Kers's band, and also played in Paris with musicians such as Benny Carter and Willie Lewis. He recorded with Gus Deloof in 1940-1941 and played with Robert Bosmans and Chas Dolne later in the decade. He continued recording into the late 1950s.

As a composer, Bee was known for the tunes "High Tension" (recorded by Luis Russell) and "Obsession" (recorded by Ted Heath and Reg Owen).
