= Bernard Etté =

German conductor and musician (1898–1973)

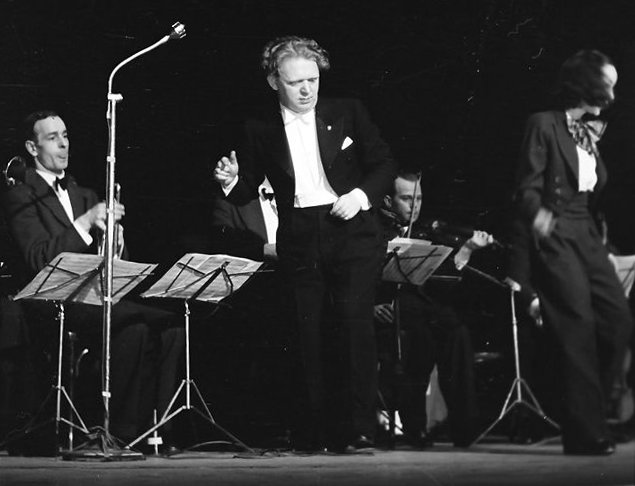
Bernhard Etté (middle) in 1938.

Bernard Etté (September 13, 1898, in Kassel – September 26, 1973, in Mühldorf) was a German jazz and light music violinist and conductor.

== Background ==
Etté was the son of a hairdresser and studied music formally at the Louis Spohr Conservatory in Kassel. He initially worked with Carl Robrecht as an instrumentalist, playing piano and banjo in addition to violin. In the early 1920s he assembled his own ensemble, which took up a residency in Berlin and performed on radio in the early 1920s. The group also recorded in the 1920s, often with traveling American musicians.

According to Grammophon - Platten.de, likely members of his group Bernard Etté und sein Orchester (Kristall) / Bernard Etté et son Orchestre (Cristal) / L'Orchestre Bernard Etté were, Johnny Dixon or Johnny Winter (tp), Peter Rasmussen (tb), Kai Ewans, Chas. Remue (as,cl) Anker Sköldborg (ts,cl), Matty Rajula (as,bar,cl), Maxl Schmidt, Frank Buchow (vln), Bernard Etté (vln,ldr), Heinz Schmidt, Jean Yatove (p) Albert Deveydt, Louis Deveydt (accor), Tony Morello (bj,g), André Schuster (b,sousa), Luggi Stampfl (d), Oskar Karlweis, Otto Fassel (vcl) and Marcel De Ridder (arr).

== Career ==
During the 1930s, as the Nazi party rose to power, Etté shifted away from jazz to light music, leading a large orchestra; during World War II he played for wounded soldiers on behalf of the Nationalsozialistische Volkswohlfahrt in 1940 and for prison overseers at Auschwitz in 1944. After the war, he moved to the United States and attempted a new career, but was unsuccessful in adapting to new stylistic trends. He returned to Germany, leading bands for luxury retreats in the East Frisian Islands and schlager and operetta backing bands in central Germany. By the end of the 1950s he had quit actively playing music, and lived out his last years in an old folk's home.
