= Billy Arnold (bandleader) =

American born bandleader in France

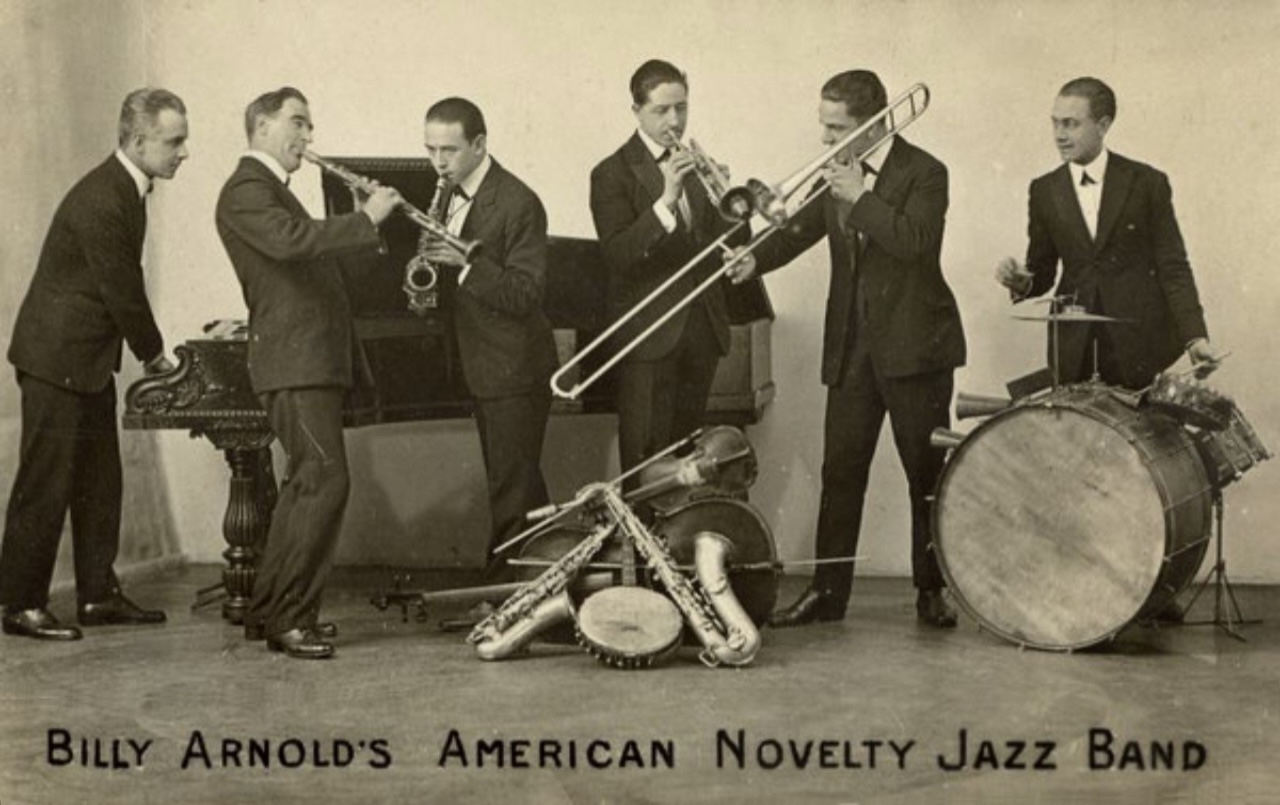
- Billy Arnold's band, probably in England around 1920

Background information
- Born: Arnold William Guldeman; January 23, 1894; Paterson, New Jersey, U.S.
- Died: January 8, 1962 (aged 67) Paterson, New Jersey, U.S.
- Genre: Jazz
- Occupations: Bandleader, piano player
- Instrument: Piano
- Years active: 1917–1962
- Formerly of: Jack Hylton, Dolly Sisters, Original Dixieland Jazz Band, Darius Milhaud

Billy Arnold (January 23, 1894 – January 8, 1962) led an early jazz band in first London and then Paris in the 1920. He was one of the first people to bring American jazz style to Europe. His band had a strong impact on classical composer Darius Milhaud and initially on Django Reinhardt.

== Early life ==
Newspaper clippings suggest he worked in Manhattan playing music for silent films.

== Career abroad ==
Under the professional name "Billy Arnold" he went to London 1919, apparently with other musicians he knew from New York. He made some records in London as Billy Arnold's Novelty band, which included his brother Henry, who had been living in London. Recordings of the band, show the strong influence of the Original Dixieland Jazz Band. While in London, in 1919, The Arnold Band played at a victory ball for General John Pershing.

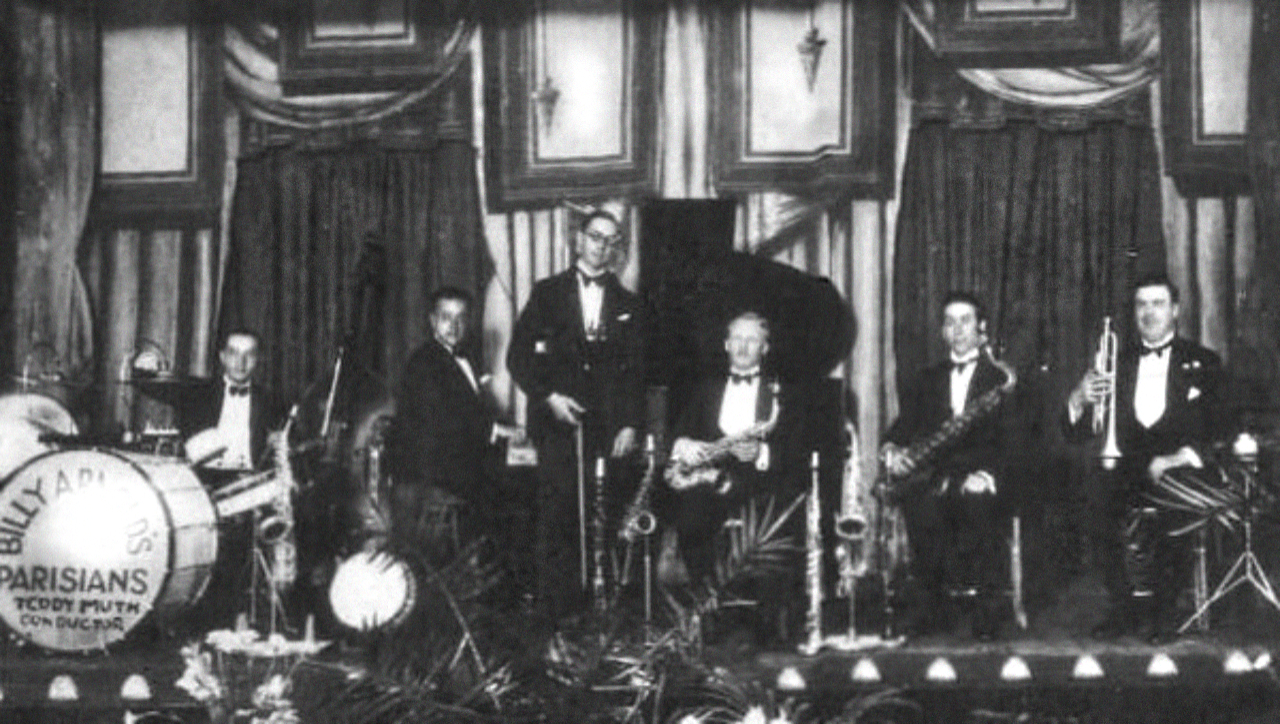
Billy Arnold and his Parisians, mid 1920s

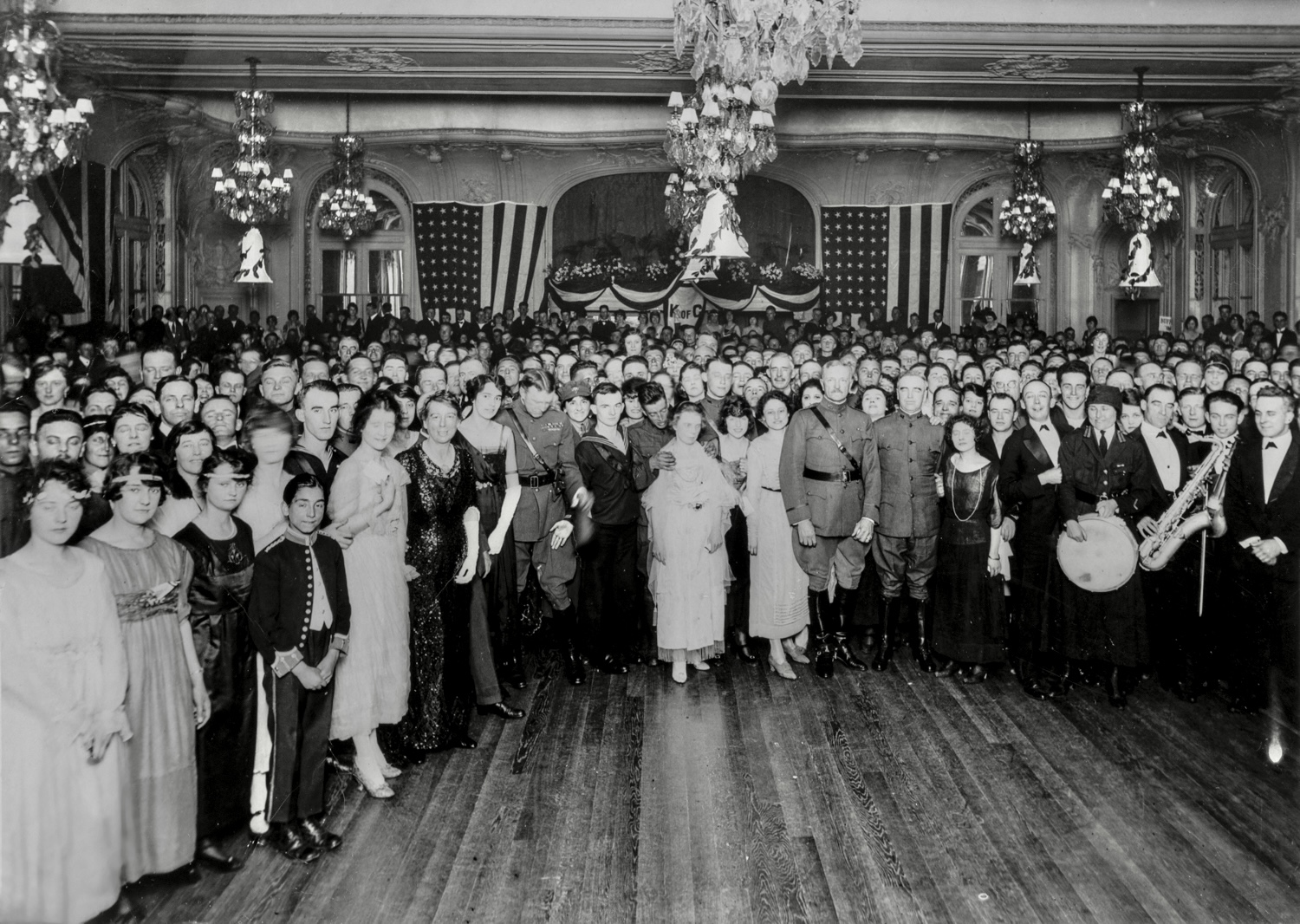
Billy Arnold and band, far right, at 1919 ball in Honor of Pershing

The composer Darius Milhaud heard the band in London, and encouraged Arnold to go to Paris, where he introduced him in avant garde music circles. The French pianist and composer Jean Wiener gave a concert in which he paired Arnold band with a mechanical piano playing Stravinsky's "Rite of Spring." Milhaud mentioned him in a 1924 article, "the Jazz Band and Negro Music," in the Living Age. Milhaud wrote:

"It is necessary to hear a serious jazz band such as Billy Arnold's or Paul Whiteman's. There nothing is left to chance, everything is balance and proportion, revealing the touch of the true musician, perfect master of all the possibilities of every instrument. One must hear a soiree by the Billy Arnold band in the Casino at Cannes or Deauville. Sometimes four saxophones are leading, sometimes the violin, the clarinet, the trumpet, or the trombone. Or again one may hear an infinite variety of instrumental combinations, uniting one after another with the piano and the percussion instruments, each with its own meaning, its own logic, its own timbre — each with an expression peculiar to itself."

Arnold's band worked steadily in Paris and in the resort towns of Cannes and Deauville, but he was deported in 1924 by French government, probably at the urging of the French musician's union. He went back to Paris again shortly after. Arnold later operated a booking agency, "Billy Arnold's Trans-Variety Theatrical Agency," in Paris, specializing in presenting American acts.

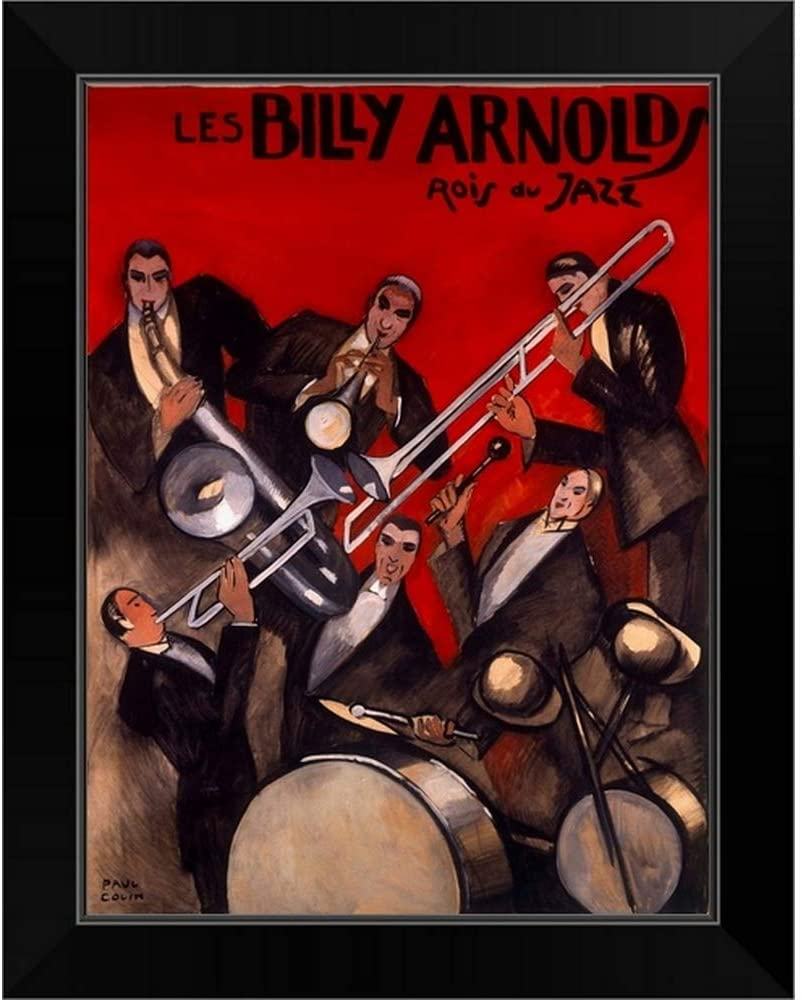

The young Django Reinhardt was much taken with the Arnold band, probably the first jazz he had ever heard. A poster painted by Paul Colin announced the Arnold band as the "Kings of Jazz." While in Paris he married Minnie Isabella Shanks, an English-born dancer.

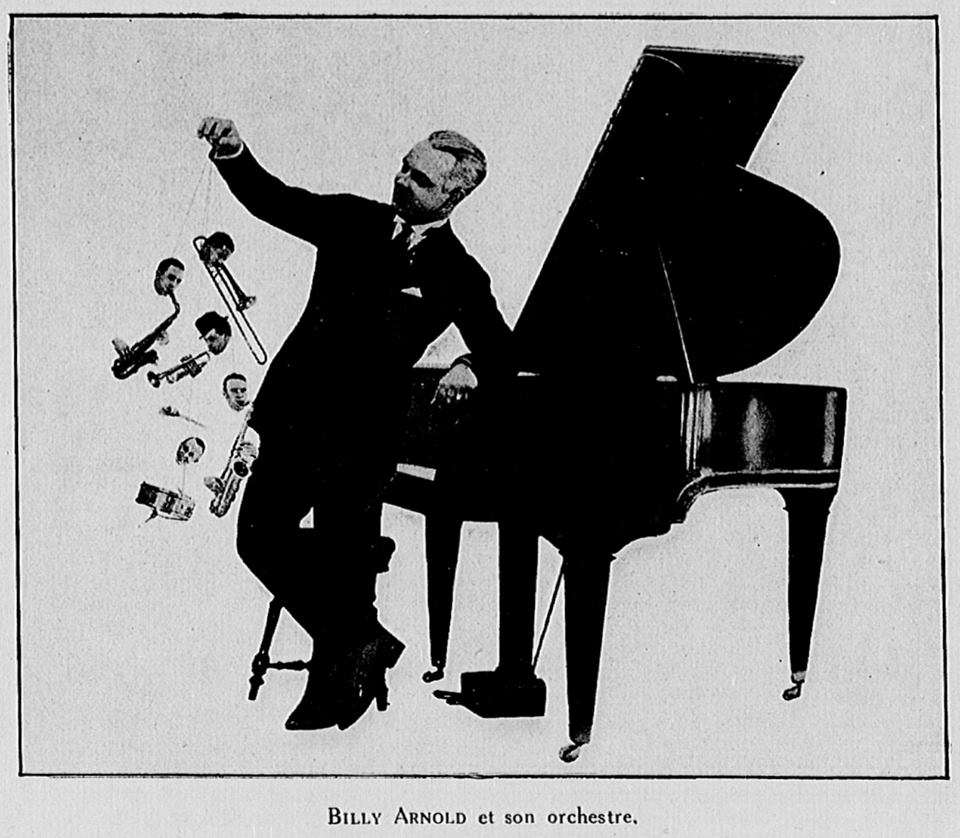
Billy Arnold, From The French magazine La Rampe, March 1st 1926

Arnold's band performed with the Dolly Sisters, who were then internationally famous and were courted by King of Denmark among others. They traveled in elite circles: The Dolly Sisters in 1926 organized a gala fund raising concert and chose Arnold to organize the music. Performers included Josephine Baker and Broadway star Harry Pilcer. In 1932 the Billy Arnold band was playing at the Casino in Cannes when a lion, part of an act at the Casino, "broke out of her cage and went for a stroll near the tea tables." Guests, including Lord and Lady Mountbatten and Lady Oxford and Asquith, began to panic. "Billy Arnold...sent his musicians into action again. They played frantically and the blaring strains of "Happy Days" rose above the shouts of the crowd....the lion's roars sounded above the wild playing of the orchestra and brought its trainer on the run." The trainer and his assistant managed to recapture the lion.

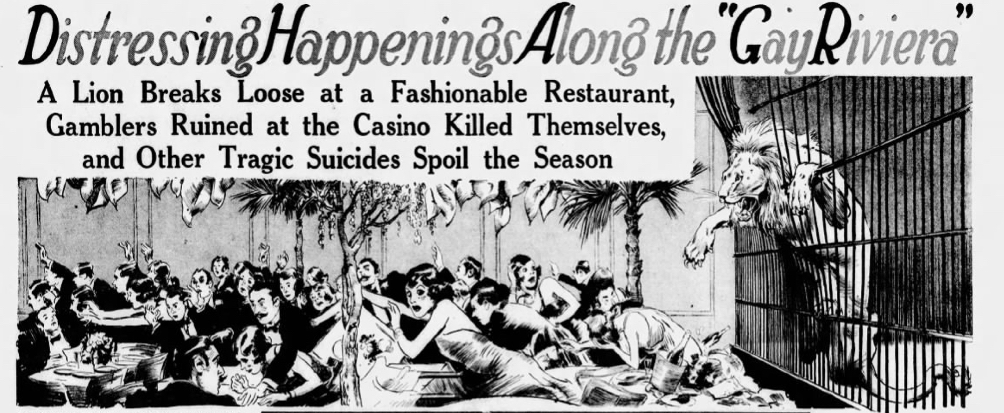
Account of the escaped lion which confronted the Arnold band in Cannes

American jazz bands were popular but met with resentment. In addition to the earlier deportation of Arnold and other American musicians, in 1933 Arnold's wife, Minnie Shanks, was arrested on the beach in Nice for indecent exposure, despite wearing a relatively modest bathing suit. "American jazz musicians are hated by their rivals because the visiting public insists on them instead of natives." wrote the San Francisco Examiner. "The government has passed laws strictly limiting the number of foreigners who may play in any one band or orchestra, and various local tricks and devices have been added to handicap the American player. In spite of everything, the Americans still get the best jobs. So the practical-minded chief of police reasoned that it would be a good idea if his "horrible examples" [of indecent exposure] were Americans, and what better choice than the wife of "Billy" Arnold, jazz-band director of the Hollywood Night Club, one of the few places that is making money in spite of the depression? It might make him so angry that he would leave France and his job would perhaps fall to some deserving Frenchman."

== Return to the United States ==
Arnold and his wife and their daughter Bobbie Zene Guldeman returned to the US for good in 1934. He ran a tavern in Glenns Falls, NJ before WWII, then in 1944 opened "Billy Arnold's Rendezvous" on rt. 4 near Paramus NJ, which he ran until his death in 1962.
