= Luiza Coppieters =

Brazilian activist (born 1979)

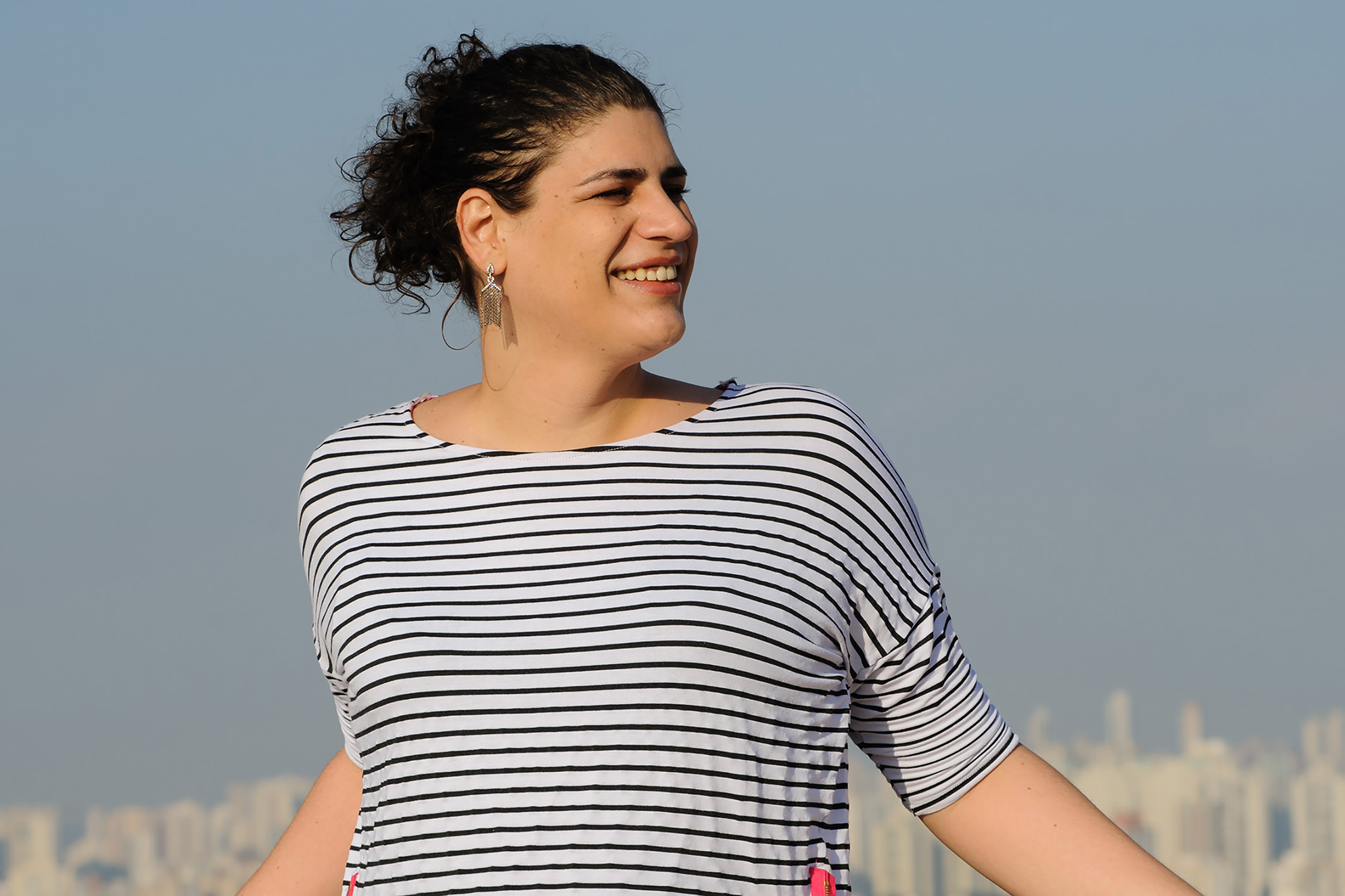
- Born: 6 July 1979 (age 47); São Paulo, Brazil
- Education: University of São Paulo
- Occupations: Professor of philosophy, municipal politician, LGBTQ+ activist, feminist
- Political party: Socialism and Liberty Party

Luiza Coppieters (born 6 July 1979) is a Brazilian professor of philosophy, municipal politician, LGBTQ+ activist, and feminist. She is affiliated with the Socialism and Liberty Party (Portuguese: Partido Socialismo e Liberdade), for which she ran for city councilor in São Paulo in 2016, and she became an alternate councilor. She is a trans woman, and was considered one of the ten most influential LGBTQ+ personalities in São Paulo in 2016. She was one of 84 trans candidates who ran for office in the 2016 municipal elections.

She holds a 2004 degree in philosophy from the University of São Paulo.

Coppieters was fired from the private school where she taught in June 2015, a few months after publicly coming out as transgender in November 2014. Coppieters was a member of the municipal council for LGBT policies in the city of São Paulo.
