= Honoré Jozef Coppieters =

Belgian prelate

His Excellency Honoré Jozef Coppieters
- Bishop of Ghent
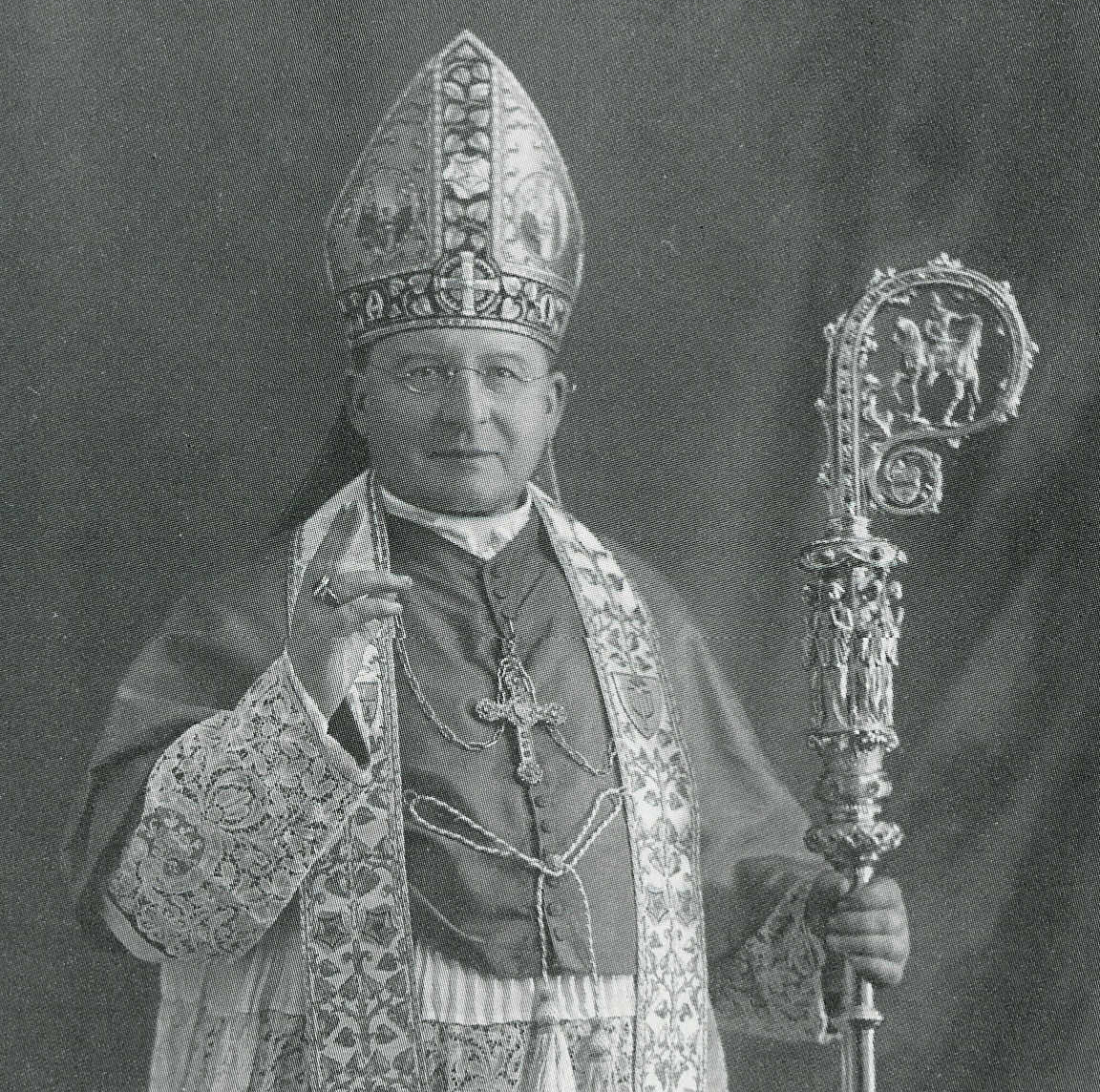
- Diocese: Ghent
- See: St Bavo's
- In office: 1927-1947
- Predecessor: Emilius Seghers
- Successor: Karel Justinus Calewaert
- Previous post: dean of Lokeren

Orders
- Consecration: 15 May 1927 by Cardinal van Roey

Personal details
- Born: 30 March 1874 Overmere
- Died: 20 December 1947 (aged 73)
- Buried: Gent
- Parents: Benedictus Coppieters
- Education: Catholic University of Leuven; St. Joseph Minor Seminary
- Motto: Fide et Caritate
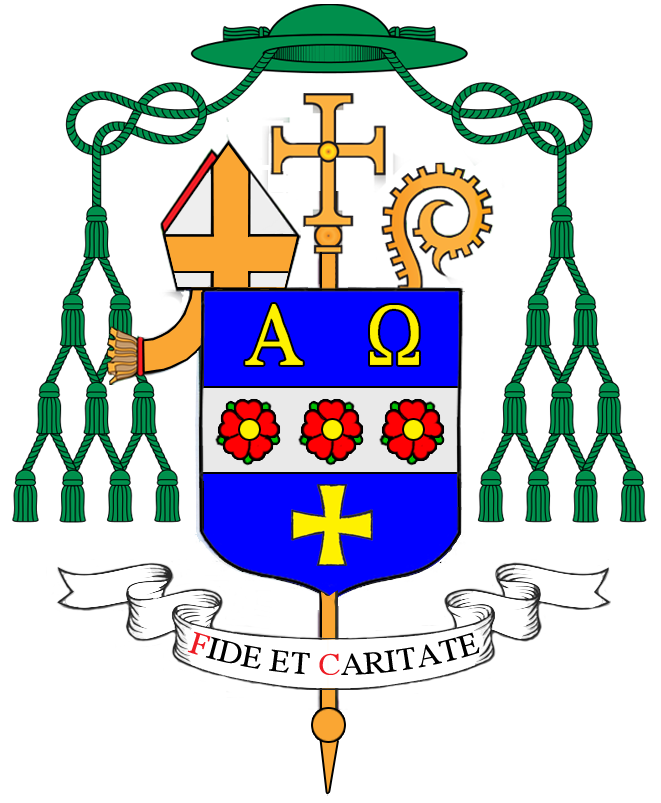
- Coat of arms: Honoré Jozef Coppieters's coat of arms

Honoré Jozef Coppieters (30 March 1874 – 20 December 1947) was a Belgian prelate who became, in 1927, the Bishop of Ghent.

== Life ==
Honoré Jozef Coppieters was born at Overmere in East Flanders, the eldest son of Benedictus Coppieters and Maria Sidonia Verstraeten. His father was a farmer.

He studied successively at St. Vincent's Catholic college in Eeklo, St. Joseph Minor Seminary in Sint-Niklaas and at the Episcopal Seminary in Ghent. He was ordained into the priesthood on 19 December 1896. After that he attended the Catholic University of Leuven, emerging in 1902 with a doctorate and a Master of Theology qualification.

From 1900 till 1920 Coppieters taught Biblical Exegesis and Hebrew at Leuven's Faculty of Theology where he also involved himself in student activism, becoming provost/moderator of the Amicitia radical catholic student fraternity established at Leuven in 1911.

On 29 December 1919 he was appointed dean of Lokeren. On 8 August 1924 he transferred as dean of Aalst.

== Episcopate ==
He was appointed coadjutor bishop to Emilius Seghers, the Bishop of Ghent, on 27 January 1927, becoming at the same time the Titular bishop of Helenopolis in Bithnia. Seghers died a few months later, and on the same day, 17 May 1927 Coppieters formally took over the Diocese of Ghent. He had been consecrated as bishop two days earlier by Cardinal van Roey. He took as his episcopal motto "Fide et Caritate" ("By faith and charity").

In 1935, ahead of the Brussels International Exposition, he purchased an organ constructed by "Johannes Klais Orgelbau" of Bonn in order to complement the organ already in the cathedral.

=== Ghent Altarpiece ===
It was also at this time that two panels were stolen from the cathedral's famous van Eyck Altarpiece. Coppieters received a ransom note, addressed to him personally on 30 April 1934, apparently sent by the thieves, in which they demanded a million Belgian francs for the safe return of the two stolen panels. Coppieters was prevented by the Belgian prosecuting authorities from paying the ransom on behalf of the church and the civil authorities took over negotiations with the art thieves, insisting that the stolen items were not merely church property but national treasures. Coppieters himself subsequently offered 25,000 Belgian francs for the safe return of the panels which some interpreted as evidencing a lack of commitment to the stolen artwork. In any event, only one of the panels had been returned by 2015, although a copy of the missing one, produced by the restorer Jef Van der Veken, has been substituted in the cathedral.

== Death ==
Honoré Jozef Coppieters died on 20 December 1947, aged 73. His body was buried with those of predecessors in the "Episcopal gallery" in the Burial Ground of St Mary's Church, but on 24 March 1959 he was one of five dead bishops whose physical remains were removed from St.Mary's and placed in the crypt of St Bavo's Cathedral, Ghent.

== Family connections ==
The wife of the Flemish composer and choir director Ernest de Regge, Helène Coppieters, was a niece of Honoré Jozef Coppieters.
