= Charles Remue =

Belgian jazz musician (1903–1971)

- Died: February 5, 1971 (aged 67)
- Genre: Jazz
- Occupation: Musician
- Instruments: Clarinet, alto saxophone, bandleader

Charles Remue (15 October 1903 – 5 February 1971) was a Belgian clarinetist, alto saxophone player and bandleader of early jazz, who, while leading a band called Chas. Remue & His New Stompers, recorded what are widely considered to be the first jazz discs (in 1927) by a Belgian band.

== Early life ==
Born in Brussels, Remue began studying music early in life and was admitted to the Royal Conservatory of Brussels in 1915. He finished in 1922, winning three Grand Prizes before doing so. His first foray into playing syncopated music was in the same year, with a small band in a Brussels dance hall. It was this experience that changed his direction from that as a classical-trained musician.

== Career ==
Remue joined the Red Mill's Jazz in 1924, the Bing Boys later that year and within the next year joined The White Diamonds, which was directed by the English drummer Billy Smith. From this group came an important friendship with René Compère. This partnership, documented by jazz historian/writer Robert Goffin in his 1932 book "Aux Fontieres du Jazz", led to the formation of His New Stompers. When music publisher/promoter Felix Faecq brought the group to London to record their first sides, five of the fourteen recordings made were written by David Bee and Peter Packay – two of the first Belgian jazz composers. London had been chosen over Brussels because of its superior recording facilities.

Remue had also played in the Bernard Etté und sein Orchester during the late 1920s.

== Later career ==
After His New Stompers, Remue joined the Savoy Orpheans and toured Europe. Upon his return to Brussels, he organized and recorded with his first big band. With the advent of the 1930s, he played with the Bernard Ette Band in Germany, then briefly had another big band, and afterwards played with various other groups until 1936, when he joined the Brussels Radio Orchestra, which was led by his old pianist Stan Brenders. Remue continued playing and recording into his later years.

== Discography ==
=== Chas. Remue & His New Stompers ===
- Alphone Cox (tp), Henri Leonard (trb), Charles Remue (cl, as, ldr), Gaston Frederic (ts, cl), Stan Brenders (p), Remy Glorieux (ssp), Harry Belien (dr)
- Edison Bell Electron Records – EBE 0153, 0154, 0160, 0161, 0162, 0163 & 0164 – 1927.

=== Other recordings ===
- Euroswing 1936–1948 Various Artists Sax (Alto), Clarinet – 1999
