= Francis Coppieters =

Belgian jazz pianist

Francis Coppieters (September 7, 1930 in Brussels – 1990) was a Belgian jazz pianist. He was the son of Fernand Coppieters.

Coppieter's first professional experience was as a teenager, playing with Toots Thielemans in 1947-1948. He also played in Hazy Osterwald's band soon after. Following a move to Paris, he played with Jacques Pelzer, Buck Clayton, René Thomas, Bobby Jaspar and then became a member of Aime Barelli's ensemble after Francy Boland's departure. He relocated to Germany in 1957, where he played with Kurt Edelhagen for several years and taught at the Cologne Conservatory. Later he worked with musicians such as Charly Antolini, Taps Miller, Klaus Weiss, Slide Hampton, Lucky Thompson, Wilton Gaynair, and Jiggs Whigham.
