= Dulcy (1923 film) =

1923 film by Sidney Franklin, Jack Wagner

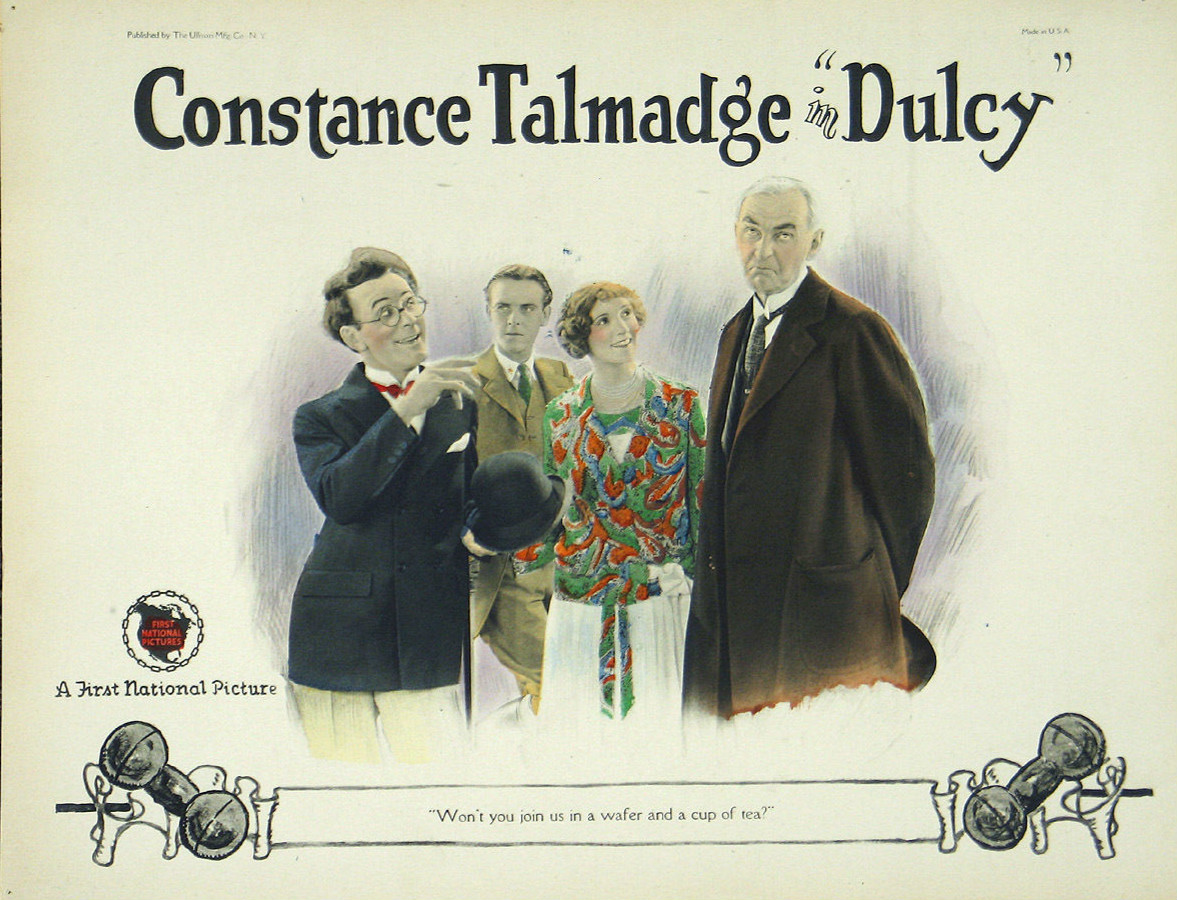
- Lobby card
- Directed by: Sidney A. Franklin
- Written by: John Emerson; Anita Loos; C. Gardner Sullivan
- Based on: Dulcy; 1921 play by Marc Connelly; George S. Kaufman
- Starring: Constance Talmadge; John Harron
- Cinematography: Norbert Brodine
- Edited by: C. Gardner Sullivan
- Production company: Constance Talmadge Film Company
- Distributed by: Associated First National Pictures
- Release date: August 23, 1923 (United States)
- Running time: 70 minutes
- Country: United States
- Language: Silent (English intertitles)

Dulcy is a 1923 American silent comedy film directed by Sidney A. Franklin and starring Constance Talmadge. The film was adapted from the Broadway production of the same name written by George S. Kaufman and Marc Connelly. The play opened in New York in August 1921 and ran for 241 performances.

== Cast ==
- Constance Talmadge as Dulcy
- Claude Gillingwater as Mr. Forbes
- Jack Mulhall as Gordon Smith
- John Harron as Bilsly Parker
- Anne Cornwall as Angela Forbes
- George Beranger as Vincent Leach
- Fred Esmelton as Blair Patterson
- Milla Davenport as Matty

== Production ==
Exteriors for Dulcy were reportedly shot on location at Yosemite Valley, Big Bear Lake, San Francisco, San Diego and Barstow.

== Remake ==
A sound, pre-code version called Not So Dumb was made in 1930 starring Marion Davies, directed by King Vidor, and produced for Cosmopolitan Productions for Metro-Goldwyn-Mayer.

Another version of Dulcy was made in 1940 by Metro-Goldwyn-Mayer. It stars Ann Sothern in the title role, and was directed by S. Sylvan Simon.

== Preservation ==
With no prints of Dulcy located in any film archives, it is a lost film.
