= Carl Robrecht =

German musician, conductor and composer (1888–1961)

Carl Robrecht (25 June 1888 – 22 September 1961) was a German musician, conductor and composer, specializing in light music, foxtrots and other dances throughout the 1920s and 1930s. Carl Robrecht also used the pseudonym "Robert Brecht" for some works.

== Musical career ==
Robrecht started learning piano in his home town of Immenhausen.
In 1907 he started his studies at the Conservatory in Leipzig. There he was taught by Gottfried Merkel, Carl Heinrich Heynsen and Max Wünsche. He graduated in June 1909.
He was a theatre conductor in Vienna and Stettin before coming to Berlin in 1923, where he died in 1961.

== Recorded works ==
Some of Carl Robrecht's works are recorded on early LP's, including:

- Samum, a symphonic foxtrot (1935)
- Fata Morgana
- Niagara
- Spitzentanz
- Kinderlieder-Potpourri (foxtrot)
