= Robert De Kers =

Belgian jazz trumpeter and bandleader (1906-1987)

Robert De Keersmaeker, better known as Robert De Kers (August 10, 1906, Antwerp - January 16, 1987, Brussels) was a Belgian jazz trumpeter and bandleader.

== Life and career ==
Kers learned to play piano as a child, and began playing jazz with local musicians while in his teens. He was the pianist for the Bing Boys in 1924-1925, then picked up trumpet. As a trumpeter, he toured Italy with the band of Jeff Candrix, brother of Fud Candrix, and played there with Carlo Benzi and David Bee's Red Beans. Later in the 1920s he was associated with Harry Flemming and Josephine Baker. In the 1930s he worked with Jean Robert and Jean Omer in addition to leading his own ensemble, the Cabaret Kings, which toured Europe. He continued recording into the 1950s, also working as an arranger and composer; he led bands in US-occupied Germany following World War II and was later head of the Wurlitzer Company's Belgian operations.

== Compositions ==
Robert De Kers published four piano 'novelty' solos at International Music Company in 1930 under the name 'R. De Kers':

- Absurdity (New Rhythm Style Piano Solo)
- Triviality
- Peculiarity
- Singularity
