= Dulcy (1940 film) =

1940 film by S. Sylvan Simon

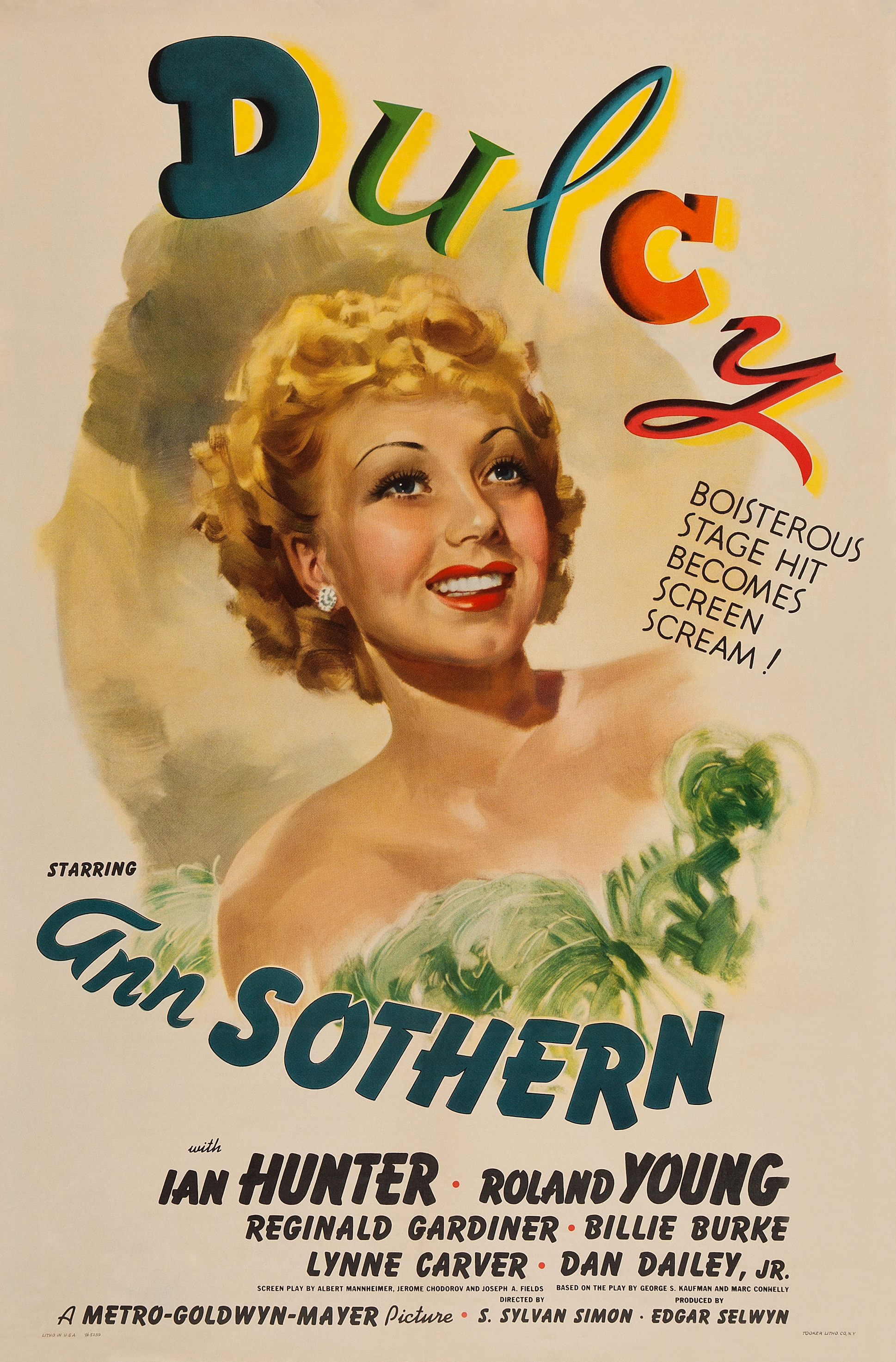
- Theatrical release poster
- Directed by: S. Sylvan Simon
- Screenplay by: Albert Mannheimer; Jerome Chodorov; Joseph A. Fields
- Based on: Dulcy; 1921 play by George S. Kaufman and Marc Connelly
- Produced by: Edgar Selwyn
- Starring: Ann Sothern; Ian Hunter; Roland Young
- Cinematography: Charles Lawton Jr.
- Edited by: Frank E. Hull
- Music by: Bronislau Kaper
- Production company: Metro-Goldwyn-Mayer
- Distributed by: Loew's Inc.
- Release date: October 4, 1940
- Running time: 73 minutes
- Country: United States
- Language: English

Dulcy is a 1940 American comedy film, based upon the 1921 play written by directed by George S. Kaufman and Marc Connelly. It was directed by S. Sylvan Simon for Metro-Goldwyn-Mayer and stars Ann Sothern, Ian Hunter, and Roland Young.

== Plot ==
Bill Ward wants to marry wealthy Angela Forbes and goes to the pier to meet her parents' cruise ship when it arrives. Bill's sister Dulcy goes along, but rather than greet the Forbeses, she becomes distracted by arriving passenger Gordon Daly.

Dulcy has a habit of doing the wrong thing. When she learns that Gordon has invented a new airplane motor and needs to raise capital, she invites him to meet Roger Forbes, father of her brother's fiancée. Then she makes a mistake during Gordon's presentation that causes the motor to spit oil in Mr. Forbes's face. He leaves in a huff.

Bill and Angela decide to elope. Dulcy introduces them to a man she's just met, Schuyler Van Dyke, who offers to fund Gordon's enterprise. All is well until Dulcy learns that Van Dyke is actually a man named Patterson who has delusions of grandeur. Luckily for all, Roger Forbes returns and outbids Van Dyke for the invention, making Dulcy an accidental hero.

== Cast ==
- Ann Sothern as Dulcy Ward
- Ian Hunter as Gordon Daly
- Roland Young as Roger Forbes
- Reginald Gardiner as Schuyler Van Dyke
- Billie Burke as Eleanor Forbes
- Lynne Carver as Angela Forbes
- Dan Dailey as Bill Ward
