= Reduta Jazz Club =

Music club in Prague, Czechia

- Reduta Jazz Club
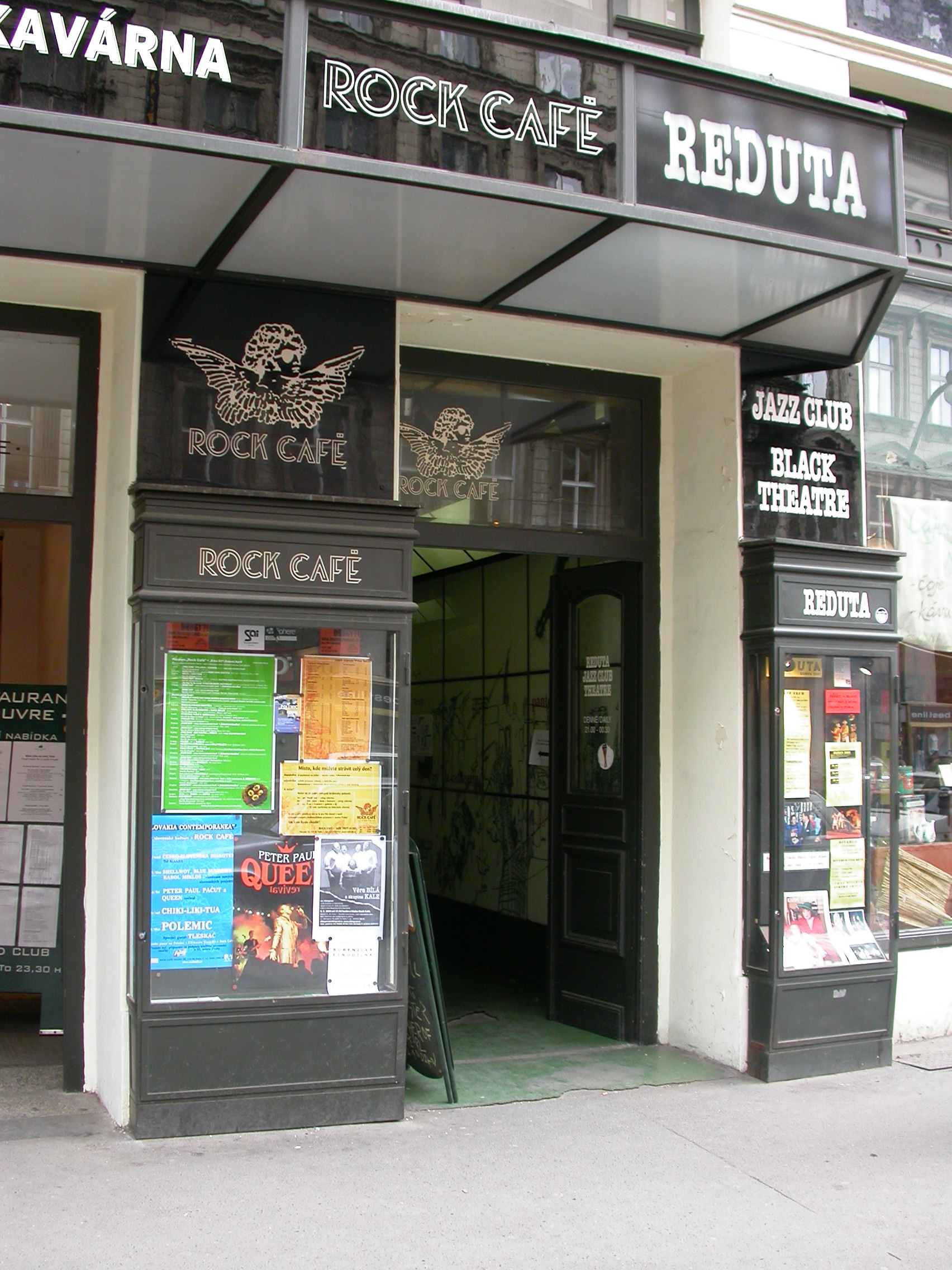
- Reduta Jazz Club in Prague
- Interactive map of Reduta Jazz Club
- Address: Národní 116; Prague 1 Czech Republic
- Coordinates: 50°4′55.31″N 14°25′6.20″E

Construction
- Opened: 1957

Website
- Official website

Reduta Jazz Club is a music club and theatre scene in Prague, Czech Republic. It is situated on Národní street in the centre of the city, close to the National Theatre. The club is particularly famous for having hosted an impromptu saxophone performance by American president Bill Clinton in 1994. Reduta is the oldest jazz club in Prague.

== History ==
The club was established in 1957 by the bassist Jan Arnet and took its name from a term for centres of fun and music, Reduta. Its early existence was associated with the activities of the Accord Club, an institute which played an important role in formation of "small stage theatres", influencing the development of theatre and music in the country in this era. At that time (early 1960s), Reduta supported small theatre ensembles such as Jára Cimrman Theatre and Lyra Pragensis. The club also attempted to promote jazz from the very beginning in the 1950s, at the time when this genre was condemned by the ruling Communist regime. The premiere concert of the renowned jazz ensemble Studio 5 took place in Reduta on 2 June 1958; the line up included important exponents of the Czech jazz, such as Karel Velebný and Luděk Hulan.

Artists performing at Reduta include jazz performers from around the world. Names like Wynton Marsalis, Dave Brubeck and Chick Corea performed at the club. Czech artists such as Vlasta Průchová, Karel Krautgartner, Miroslav Vitouš, Jiří Jelínek and Jiří Stivín regularly played in the club as well. The club also actively participated in organizing of the Prague International Jazz Festival, since 1964.

At the end of the 1980s, Reduta Jazz Club became one of the centres of the Velvet Revolution. It managed to retain its appeal after the end of the Communist regime. American president Bill Clinton played the saxophone—a gift from the Czech president Václav Havel—in a traditional jam session at Reduta in 1994, during his presidential term.

Nowadays Reduta focuses on fusing jazz with modern progressive styles. Their programmes throughout the year include swing, Dixieland, mainstream and modern jazz, also big band compositions, blues, funky, bossa nova and jazz pop. Reduta includes a black light theatre, mime theatre and new performances of young theatre groups from Prague.

On Sunday November 3rd 2024, Bill Clinton revisited the Reduta club, while attending a security conference in Prague as part of the celebrations of the 25th anniversary of the Czech Republic joining NATO.
