= Freddie Brocksieper =

Fritz "Freddie" Brocksieper (August 24, 1912 in Constantinople, Ottoman Empire – January 17, 1990) was a German jazz-musician, drummer, and bandleader.

== Early life ==
Brocksieper was born in Constantinople. At a young age in 1917, he observed military parades and developed an attraction to Turkish cymbals that led him to pursue music later in life. His family migrated to Munich in 1918, and he eventually took up drumming to the detriment of his engineering education.

== Career ==
He was playing professionally in Germany by 1930, working in Nuremberg and Berlin in the 1930s. During World War II he played with the Goldene Sieben (Golden Seven, 1939), Benny De Weille (1940), Willy Berking (1940–1941), and the radio orchestra of Lutz Templin, just as in the National-Socialist propaganda band Charlie and His Orchestra. His playing style on the drums was influenced above all by Gene Krupa. He recorded with his own ensembles, both large and small, in the later 1940s; he performed for American GIs in Stuttgart, Munich, and Berlin.

The son of a Greek-speaking Jewish woman and a German engineer, he was able to get through National-Socialism as an essential swing musician. Freddie Brocksieper was considered a leading figure of early European big-band jazz. After the Second World War he led various bands in Stuttgart, Munich, and Berlin, and played also in American officers' clubs. With his bands he made it to the front page of Stars and Stripes. Beginning in 1957 Bavarian radio regularly broadcast live concerts from his studio in Munich.

Brocksieper continued performing in the 1960s and 1970s, and was awarded a Deutscher Schallplattenpreis in 1980. From 1964 he played mainly in trios, and often with American soloists in Europe.
