= Eva Olmerová =

Czech pop and jazz singer

Background information
- Born: 21 January 1934
- Origin: Prague, Czechoslovakia
- Died: 10 August 1993 (aged 59)
- Genres: Jazz; Pop music
- Occupation: Singer

Eva Olmerová (21 January 1934 – 10 August 1993) was a Czech pop and jazz singer. She is regarded as one of the greatest Czech jazz singers of all time.

== Biography ==
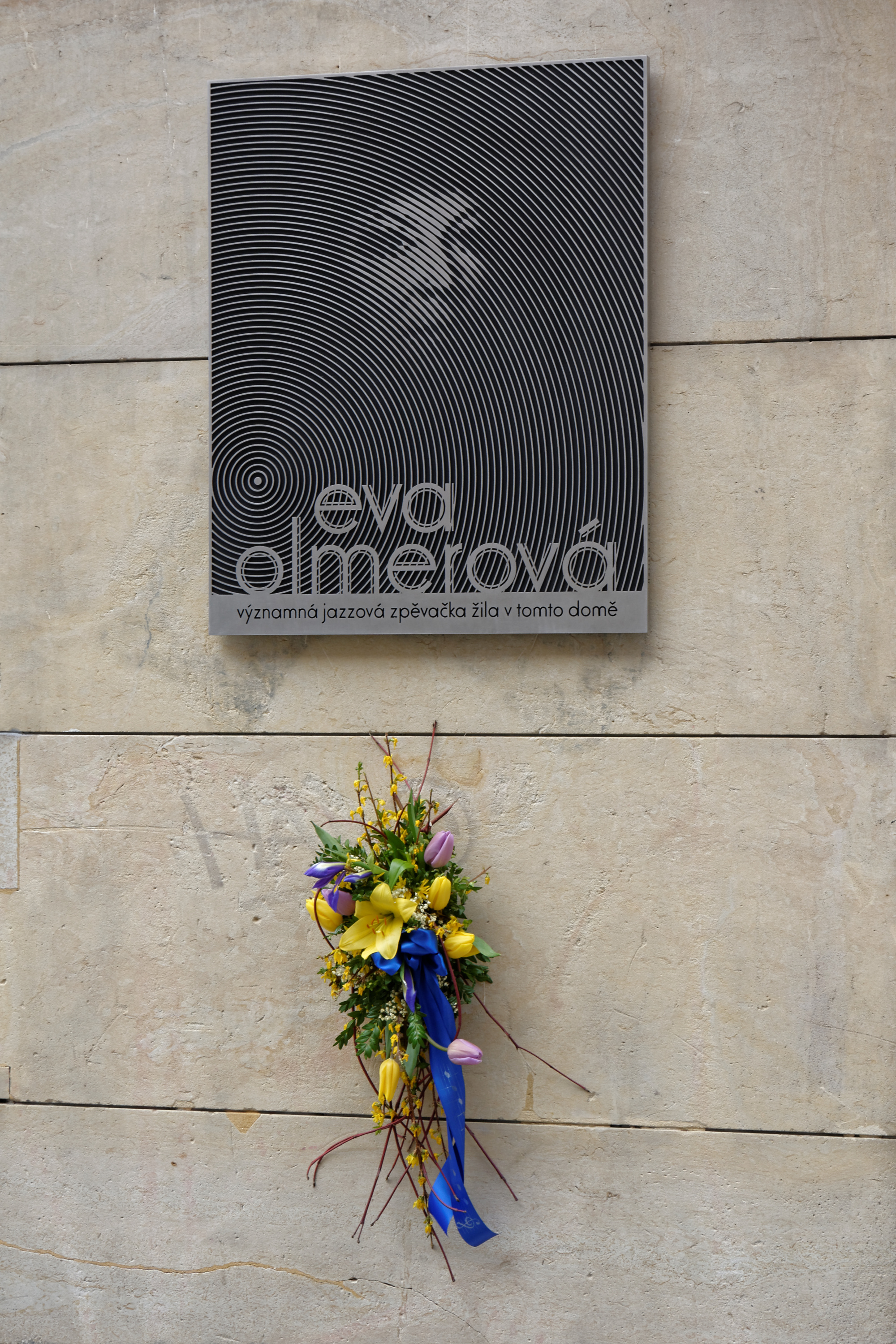
Eva Olmerová memorial plaque on the house in Eliášova Street 21 in Prague 6 – Bubenec where the singer lived.

Eva Olmerová was born in Prague in 1934. She started piano lessons at the age of 6, as a pupil of Aurelie Káanová-Bubnová. After World War II her grandparents returned from London, where her grandfather had worked with Edvard Beneš, president of the exiled Czechoslovak government. Her parents divorced in 1948, when she was fourteen.

She remained with her father, at his cottage in the village of Třebsín near Štěchovice. While there, she had first-hand experience of the tramping movement and began to sing folk songs with guitar accompaniment. In the early 1950s she became involved in Prague's jazz scene and performed with the Arnošt Kavka Band. In 1951, aged seventeen, she was arrested by the Czechoslovak state security service, in connection with her grandfather's political activities and her uncle Otmar Kučera's wartime service as Commander of 313 Squadron RAF. At the police station she experienced degrading treatment: she was forced to undress, then interrogated. Later, in 1958, she attacked and slapped a policeman and was jailed for fourteen months.

In 1952, she married for the first time but was soon divorced. For a while she earned a living as a professional singer in the bars of Prague. In 1962, the composer Karel Mareš offered her an engagement with the Semafor Theatre. Olmerová agreed, but this promising start was sabotaged when her "criminal past" was revealed in anonymous letters. Her performance of the Mareš song Jsi jako dlouhý most ("You're Like A Bridge So Long") won her the Czechoslovak song competition Hledáme písničku pro všední den ("In search of a song for the weekday"). She was otherwise banned from public performance in Prague.

Towards the end of 1963 the official restrictions imposed on Olmerová's career were eased. She began a collaboration with the Traditional Jazz Studio, worked occasionally with other music ensembles and was also allowed to perform regularly in the Theatre on the Balustrade, where she met and formed a friendship with Václav Havel, the later Czechoslovak and Czech president. In 1965 she married again. This marriage ended with her husband's emigration after less than a year. Olmerová began to use phenmetrazine in combination with alcohol – she sought psychiatric help but her use of alcohol and drugs would continue to dog her career.

In the 1960s she performed in several films and in 1967 returned to the Semafor Theatre. In 1969, she released her first studio album – The Jazz Feeling – with S+HQ and Karel Velebný. It gained wide critical acclaim and Olmerová was invited to perform in Western Europe but the Czechoslovak music agency Pragokoncert, closely tied with the communist authorities, refused her the necessary travel permit due to her "unreliability". In 1969 Olmerová may have met the American jazz singer Ella Fitzgerald after Fitzgerald's Prague concert. In this version of events, Ella Fitzgerald was impressed by Olmerová's voice and invited her to join the rest of Fitzgerald's European tour. (Some eyewitnesses question the story.) Olmerová is known to have remained in Prague during Fitzgerald's tour. In 1969 she reunited with Pavel Smetáček and his Traditional Jazz Studio.

In 1972 Olmerová married for the third time. This marriage also quickly ended in divorce and in the same year she drunkenly crashed a Wartburg car borrowed from jazz bassist Luděk Hulan. She was arrested and sentenced to ten months in jail. In 1974, she recorded her second album: Eva Olmerová & The Traditional Jazz Studio. Live performances were increasingly problematic, due to her alcoholism. In 1978 she started working with the Prague Big Band and Milan Svoboda. She recorded her next album, Zahraj i pro mne ("Play Also for Me") with the Jazz Orchestra of the Czechoslovak Radio at the age of 48. It was her first to be sung with Czech lyrics. In 1984, she received the Luděk Hulan Award.

In the 1980s Olmerová performed with the Metropolitan Jazz Band, the Steamboat Stompers and with the Senior Dixieland, and occasionally sang with folk and country musicians (Wabi Ryvola among others). In 1986 she recorded the album Dvojčata ("The Twins") with Jitka Vrbová and Hot Jazz Prague. Her health was rapidly deteriorating, due her alcoholism and associated lifestyle. She lived in poor domestic conditions on a low rate of invalidity pension, but continued singing. From 1989 she performed with what was to be her last regular ensemble, the S-band.

Eva Olmerová welcomed the fall of the communist régime in 1989 and visited Václav Havel at Prague Castle, but her health was ruined. Drahomíra Vihanová made a short documentary film about her in 1991 – Proměny přítelkyně Evy ("Changes of Friend Eva"). It generated some harsh critical responses as "naturalistic" and "coarse". Olmerová wanted to take Vihanová to court, but the Czech director Ivan Vyskočil discouraged her.

In her last years, Olmerová performed with the pianist Emil Viklický. During studio rehearsals for her final album, Svíčka a stín ("The Candle and the Shadow") she collapsed, but as soon as she had been treated at hospital she returned to the studio.

Eva Olmerová made her last recording on 26 May 1993, and died on 10 August 1993, in the hospital in Prague-Bubeneč. The primary cause of her death was cirrhosis of the liver. She died childless.

In 2006, the Prague municipal government approved naming a street (situated in Prague 15 district) in her honor.

== Inspiration and style ==
Olmerová was an entirely self-taught singer. She claimed to be free of the influences of other singers but admitted to an admiration for Mahalia Jackson and the styles of Frank Sinatra, Dean Martin and Bing Crosby. She referred to Karel Gott, the most popular singer in Czechoslovakia, as having "...a homosexual feeble voice with falsetto". On the Czech jazz scene she was often compared to Bessie Smith and Billie Holiday, both for her voice and her turbulent lifestyle. Czech music critic Jiří Černý compared her to Janis Joplin in one of his reviews. According to Černý, Olmerová's potential for world fame was never realised because of her oppression by two regimes – the Czechoslovak communist regime which banned her performances abroad, and her own "life regime". Vlasta Průchová, another significant singer of her generation, stated that Olmerová "...has everything, what a good jazz singer should have – the feeling, colourful voice and original expression." Her rare feeling for jazz was probably the most valued feature of her style. Her merits as a singer were also appreciated by folk and country bands and aficionados. The somewhat sentimental mood of most contemporary folk and country songs were revitalised under her lively swing and blues singing style.

== Discography ==
- Jazz Feeling', Supraphon (1969, 2001)
- Eva Olmerová & The Traditional Jazz Studio, Supraphon (1974)
- Zahraj i pro mne, Panton (1980)
- Vítr rváč, Panton (1983), Supraphon (2005)
- Dvojčata, Supraphon (1987)
- Svíčka a stín, Panton (1992)
- Legenda – Eva Olmerová, Sony (2008)
