= Vlasta Průchová =

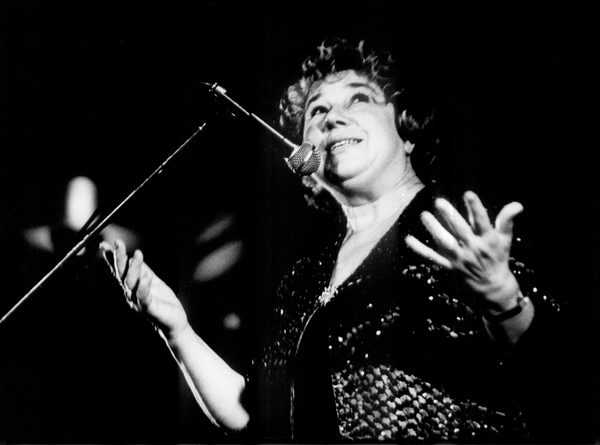

Background information
- Born: Vlasta Průchová; July 12, 1926; Ružomberok, Czechoslovakia
- Died: June 16, 2006 (aged 79) Prague, Czech Republic
- Genres: swing, vocal jazz
- Occupation: Vocalist
- Years active: 1947–2006
- Labels: Supraphon, Panton

Vlasta Průchová (12 July 1926, Ružomberok – 16 June 2006, Prague) was a Czech jazz singer. From the second half of the 1940s, she gradually built up her leading position in the Czech jazz scene. Průchová was the mother of the renowned Czech-American pianist and composer Jan Hammer.

== Biography ==
Průchová was born to Czech parents who worked in Ružomberok, Slovakia at that time. She was baptised by the Slovak priest Andrej Hlinka. At the end of 1938, the family was forced to leave Slovakia, and they resided in Prague.

Following the Second World War, Průchová had her first experience with jazz music. At the Filmové žně (Film Harvest Festival) in Zlín she attended the performance of the "ensemble of swing stars" Elit Club. Among the members of the band was also her future husband, Jan Hammer Sr. She later saw their performances in the Prague palace Metro, where the band played in the "swing pub" Akvarium. From her youth, she showed a musical talent in singing and Jan Hammer Sr. finally persuaded her to join the band. In 1947, she began to perform in the first Prague jazz club, Pygmalion. The band was renamed Rytmus 47. In the same year she married Hammer. Pygmalion was closed in 1949 and following that Průchová sang in the legendary Prague dance-hall Lucerna Palace. At the same time she also collaborated with significant Czech jazz instrumentalists Luděk Hulan, Ferdinand Havlík and others.

In the 1950s, Průchová — as a member of the Karel Krautgartner Orchestra — became one of the most successful participants of the Czechoslovak song competition Hledáme písničku pro všední den (In Search of a Song for the Weekday). In 1952, she was voted the best Czech jazz woman singer in the poll of the samizdat Boptime.

At the beginning of the 1960s, Průchová continued her concert career together with her husband, the cardiologist and musician Jan Hammer Sr. Their children, Jan and Andrea, occasionally joined them on piano and drums. Their flat became a place of regular jam sessions with fellow musicians. On one of these occasions, in 1965, she invited the American jazz singer and trumpeter Louis Armstrong for dinner, and they jammed together.

In 1968, during the dramatic events of the Warsaw Pact invasion of Czechoslovakia, the whole family moved to the United States. Jan Hammer Sr. received a one-year research fellowship in Washington, D.C., and Jan Hammer Jr. began to study at the Berklee College of Music in Boston. Their stay in the USA was entirely legal but the return to the Czechoslovakia brought them considerable problems. Jan Hammer Jr. remained in the United States, but his father's career in medicine was stopped. Andrea was not admitted to study at the Prague Conservatory. The one-year stay in a Western country was too suspicious for Czechoslovak communist regime.

Průchová was affected by communist state too. Although she was allowed to perform in the Prague clubs, she was prevented from making new recordings for more than twenty years. She was forced to find a new band for her performances at clubs and regional jazz festivals. Thus began her co-operation with young exponents of the Czech jazz scene, Emil Viklický, and later with the pianist Zdeněk Zdeněk.

Jan Hammer Sr. died on 2 May 1989, a few months before the Czechoslovak Velvet Revolution. Průchová appeared on the stage afterwards, in the 1990s and in the early years of the new millennium. She died on 16 June 2006 in Prague.

== Style ==
Průchová was one of the pioneers of the Czech jazz singing. Her musical style encompasses various genres from jazz standards and swing to bebop. In the 1950s and 1960s she also influenced the style of the Czech pop music with her specific phrasing and diction. She represents a part of the continuity of the Czech jazz in the second half of the 20th century. In her later years Průchová rarely changed her repertoire, she is considered an exponent of the "classical jazz singing". The Czech musicologist Lubomír Dorůžka called her "a key person of the Czech jazz singing" in one of his specialised jazz publications.

Antonín Matzner and Igor Wasserberger compared her to the American jazz singer Ella Fitzgerald in their book Jazzové profily (Jazz Profiles). Průchová even adopted a part of Fitzgerald's standard repertoire and also appeared in films. In 1951, she played a singer in the crime film V trestném území (In the Penalty Area). In 2001, she appeared in the documentary Milý společník aneb Blues pro Luďka Hulana (lit. 'A pleasant Companion or Blues for Luděk Hulan').

== Discography ==
- Všechno je prosté (1961) - music: Jan Hammer Sr., orchestral accompaniment: Dance Orchestra of the Czechoslovak Radio.
- The Man I Love (1965) - music: George Gershwin, with Junior Trio.
- Tonight (Arta, 1991) (Ar F 1 0027-2) - first recordings after 27-year pause.
- Docela všední, obyčejný den [CD] (Bonton Music, 1997) (B 71 0567-2) - re-edition of her recordings from 1958 to 1964.
- Vlasta Průchová - na počátku bylo blues [CD] (Supraphon, 2006) (SU 5708-2) - recordings from 1950 to 1977.
