= Kamil Běhounek =

Czech-German accordionist and composer

Kamil Běhounek (29 March 1916 – 22 November 1983) was a Czech-German accordionist and composer. He played jazz and popular music. He also worked as a bandleader, arranger and film scorer. He also occasionally played tenor saxophone.

== Biography ==
Běhounek was born on 29 March 1916 in Blatná, Bohemia, Austria-Hungary. He was an autodidact on accordion, having learned to play by imitating recordings and BBC broadcasts. He studied law in Prague and began performing in clubs; his first recordings on solo accordion date from 1936. In the late 1930s, he worked with the Blue Music Orchestra, Rudolf Antonín Dvorský, Jiří Traxler, and Karel Vlach.

In 1943, he was forcibly compelled by the Nazis to go to Berlin and make arrangements for the bands of Lutz Templin and Ernst van't Hoff. Upon his return to Czechoslovakia in 1945, he used some of these arrangements for his own band, then returned to Germany the following year, where he continued arranging for bandleaders such as Adalbert Luczkowski, Willy Berking, Heinz Schönberger, and Werner Müller. He also played with his own ensemble, including in Bonn and, after 1948, in West Germany for American soldiers' clubs. Between 1968 and 1977 he recorded several albums of folk music, but continued to play swing with his own groups. He died on 22 November 1983 in Bonn.

He wrote an autobiography, Má láska je jazz ("Jazz is my love"), which was published posthumously in 1986.
