= Louis Freichel =

German jazz pianist and guitarist

- Born: December 21, 1921; Frankfurt, Germany
- Died: November 22, 1997 (aged 75)
- Genres: Jazz
- Occupations: Pianist, guitarist, composer, arranger
- Years active: 1943–1983

Louis Freichel (December 21, 1921 – November 22, 1997) was a German jazz pianist and guitarist.

Freichel was born in Frankfurt and received formal training in music there from 1938 to 1941. From 1943 to 1945 he played with the Hotclub Combo (de), then after the end of World War II worked with Benny De Weille (1945-1948). Starting in 1949 he played with Willy Berking's radio band, working with him through 1956, and also recorded with Two Beat Stompers and with Dusko Goykovich and Albert Mangelsdorff in the 1950s. From 1956 to 1983 he played piano, composed, and arranged for Hessischer Rundfunk's broadcast jazz band. In 1976–1980 he also worked with Heinz Schönberger's (de) Main Stream Power Band [sic]. He also composed for Vico Torriani, Anita Lindblom, Peter Orloff (de), Peggy Noire, and Ulla Norden (de).
