= Eva tropí hlouposti =

1939 film by Martin Frič

Eva Fools Around
- Theatrical release poster
- Directed by: Martin Frič
- Written by: Vladimír Peroutka
- Based on: Patsy tropí hlouposti by Fan Vavřincová
- Produced by: Jan Sinnreich
- Starring: Zdeňka Baldová
- Cinematography: Václav Hanuš
- Edited by: Jan Kohout
- Music by: Kamil Běhounek; Jiří Traxler
- Production company: Lucernafilm
- Distributed by: Lucernafilm
- Release date: 10 November 1939
- Running time: 85 minutes
- Country: Protectorate of Bohemia and Moravia
- Language: Czech

Eva Fools Around (Czech: Eva tropí hlouposti) is a Czech comedy film directed by Martin Frič. It was released in 1939.

== Plot ==
Eva Norová goes to visit her aunt Pa for her 60th birthday. Pa's wish is to learn how to grow the kind of roses that her neighbour, factory owner Záhorský has cultivated. However, aunt Pa is not on friendly terms with her neighbour. Eva applies for a job as a secretary in order to steal the instructions for growing the roses. Meanwhile, Eva's brother Michal, who has fallen in love with Záhorský's daughter Eliška, also makes his way to the Záhorský residence. Eva in turn falls in love with the Záhorskýs' secretary, Jiří Kučera, who has nestled his way into the family in order to win back his stolen family jewels. When Eva brings the instructions for growing the roses to her aunt, she finds out that she already got them a week earlier from Záhorský's daughter Eliška, and Eva returns the instructions. In the end everything turns out well, the Záhorskýs become friends with aunt Pa and offer her the rose growing instructions themselves, Jiří's family jewels are returned, Michal is engaged to Eliška and Eva gets together with Jiří.

== Cast ==
- Nataša Gollová as Eva Norová
- Oldřich Nový as Michal Nor
- Zdeňka Baldová as Aunt Pa
- Gustav Hilmar as Factory owner Tomáš Záhorský
- Marta Májová as Mrs. Emilie Záhorská
- Jiřina Sedláčková as Eliška Záhorská
- Josef Gruss as Zdeněk Kolář
- Raoul Schránil as Jiří Kučera
- Ella Nollová as Housekeeper Klotylda
- Bolek Prchal as Butler Jan
