= Jiří Traxler =

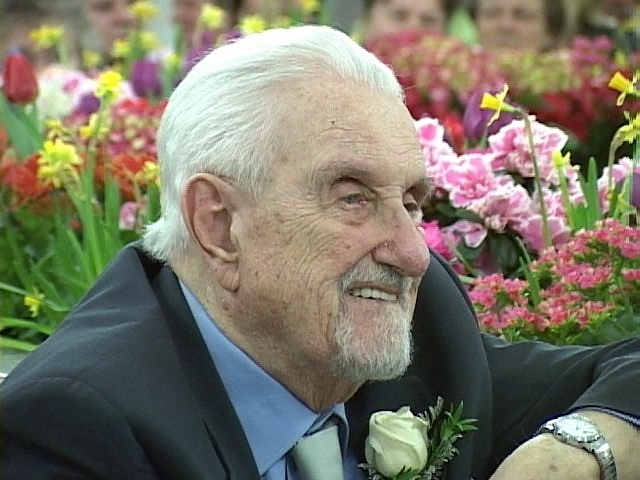
- Jiří Traxler celebrates 95th birthday, Edmonton, Canada, 10 March 2007.

Background information
- Born: Jiří Traxler; March 12, 1912; Tábor, Austria-Hungary
- Died: 7 August 2011 (aged 99) Edmonton, Alberta, Canada
- Genres: Jazz; Swing
- Occupations: Composer; Arranger
- Instrument: Piano

Jiří "George" Traxler (12 March 1912 – 7 August 2011) was a Czech Canadian jazz and swing pianist, composer, lyricist and arranger, and was considered a founder and co-creator of the swing music era in Czechoslovakia. He was the last surviving collaborator of the renowned Czech pre-war composer Jaroslav Ježek. In 1951 he emigrated to Canada, and lived with his wife, Jarmila, in Edmonton until his death in the summer of 2011.

== Biography ==
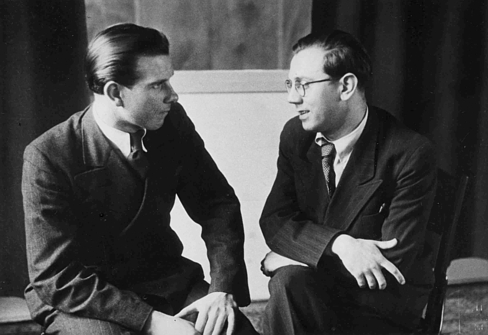
Jiří Traxler (left) and Jaroslav Ježek in Studio Ultraphon on 21 April 1938.

Traxler was born in Tábor, Bohemia, then a part of Austria-Hungary. He began his musical training at an early age at the Music Institute in Tábor. In high school, he joined his brother's dance orchestra, The Red Ace Players. After his graduation at local gymnasium, he began studying law; but from 1935 on, devoted himself solely to music.

From 1935 to 1937, he performed and recorded as a member of the Gramoklub Orchestra in Prague. Two of his compositions—"Feelin´ Low" and "Short Story"—were included in a series of 1936 recordings made for the popular Czechoslovak label Ultraphon. His foxtrot, "A Little Rhythm", became the orchestra's theme song. In 1937, he became a member of the Society for the Protection of the Rights of Music Authors and Publishers (in Czech: Ochranný svaz autorský [OSA]).

Traxler's brief collaboration with Jaroslav Ježek and his Swing Band began in 1938. Traxler wrote four promising jazz compositions for the band—two of which, "Full Moon´s Music" and "Noisy Serenade", were recorded for Ultraphon. The band performed Traxler's other compositions, "Roaring in F" and "Blues", on Prague Radio in 1938. The songs's scores have been lost. The collaboration was interrupted in January 1939, as Ježek was forced to emigrate to the United States following the Nazi invasion of Czechoslovakia.

Traxler worked with the ensembles Blue Music (1938–1939) and Elit Club (1942). He was also engaged as a composer of modern dance music at the Prague publishing house Mojmír Urbánek. In 1939 he signed a five-year contract with a prominent publishing house led by singer and bandleader R. A. Dvorský. As a member of the R. A. Dvorský Orchestra, he performed on the major stages of Bohemia and Moravia. He also took up the post of arranger, lyricist, translator and host of the orchestra's concert and radio performances. In 1948 he returned to Urbánek; however, his new five-year contract ended prematurely because of nationalization of private property by the Czechoslovak communist régime in 1948. At this time, he joined the Karel Vlach Orchestra.

In 1949, a year after the communist coup d'état, Traxler composed music for the comedy play "Moje žena Penelopa" ("My Wife Penelope"). After its premiere, the government immediately banned the play as "politically undesirable". That year, Traxler decided to flee the country.

After a short stay in West Germany, Traxler went to Canada in 1950. Adapting to his new home's culture, he found some work as a composer and arranger. He settled in Montreal and worked as a drafter for Canadair Ltd. In 1982, his memoir, "Já nic, já muzikant" ("Don't Blame Me, I'm Just a Musician") was published by the Czech Canadian exile publishing house Sixty-Eight Publishers, led by Josef Škvorecký.

In 2008, the Edmonton chapter of the Czechoslovak Society of Arts and Sciences (SVU) arranged for publication of Traxler's second book, "Já nic, já muzikant na penzi" (subtitled "Literary Etudes of the Jazz Mohican"). containing witty writing, verse, song texts, aphorisms, and short stories that characterized Traxler's inextinguishable creativity until the last years of his life. In 2009, Czech musician Ondřej Havelka made a documentary film about Traxler, "Poslední Mohykán" ("The Last of the Mohicans"). Traxler died in Edmonton on 7 August 2011, at the age of 99.

== Works ==
During his career in Czechoslovakia, Traxler recorded (on vinyl records) and published printed versions of about 120 of his compositions, and wrote around 200 during his lifetime.

=== Film music ===
- Eva tropí hlouposti (1938) - the first Czech "crazy comedy", music together with Kamil Běhounek.
- Za tichých nocí (In the Quiet Nights, 1941) - jazz arrangements for three compositions by Rudolf Friml.
- Sobota (Saturday, 1944) - music and lyrics, together with J. Stelibský.

=== Stage music ===
- Hledá se zlato - student work, music a lyrics.
- Tak jako v nebi (1947) - musical, together with Petr Kareš.
- Moje žena Penelopa (1949) - Polish comedy, the successful performance was subsequently banned by communists.

=== Songs ===
- Hádej, hádej
- Jedu nocí
- Soumrak
- Padají hvězdy z nebe
- Bloudění v rytmu
- Nám to nevadí
- Bílé mraky

=== Recordings ===
- Hold Jiřímu Traxlerovi, CD (FR0167-2)
- Kamil Běhounek, Jiří Traxler - Swing Time, CD

== Awards ==
- Masaryk Prize (2006) - awarded by Czech and Slovak Association of Canada (České a slovenské sdružení v Kanadě) to the notable personalities of Czech origin living abroad.
- 2009 - Award for the "Contribution to the Czech music" by the Society for the Protection of the Rights of Music Authors and Publishers (Ochranný svaz autorský (OSA))

== Literature ==
- Dorůžka, Lubomír; Poledňák, Ivan (1967). Československý jazz - minulost a přítomnost (in Czech). Prague/Bratislava: Editio Supraphon.
- Traxler, Jiří (2008). Já nic, já muzikant... na penzi - Literární etudy jazzového mohykána (in Czech). IFP Publishing. ISBN 978-80-903997-4-7.
- Traxler, Jiří (2012). Život v rytmu swingu (1. vyd. ed.). Praha: BVD. ISBN 978-80-87090-55-8.
