= Karl Schwedler =

Karl Emil Heinrich Schwedler, also known as Charlie Schwedler (August 13, 1902 – June 20, 1970) was a singer and leader of the Nazi propaganda jazz band Charlie and His Orchestra during World War II. He was born in Duisburg, Germany.

== Life ==
Little is known of Schwedler's early life, except that his father, Wilhelm, was a plumber, and that Karl lived in Cologne in the 1920s, moving to Düsseldorf in 1930. By November 1939, he was employed by the U.S. section of the Nazi Foreign Ministry's broadcasting department (Kultur-R).

Described by British-born Nazi collaborator Norman Baillie-Stewart as a "crooner" and a "playboy" who spoke excellent English, Schwedler was held in high regard for his propaganda work by Foreign Minister Joachim von Ribbentrop himself. Sometime in 1939, Karl Schwedler — now called "Charlie" —formed a Nazi swing band, Charlie and His Orchestra, which made a series of "cabaret" recordings: parodies of popular English-language songs with Nazi-favourable lyrics. Winston Churchill was alleged to be a fan, apparently finding the new lyrics hilarious. Charlie and His Orchestra recorded thirty-seven tunes that were monitored by the BBC; later, discs of the songs were found by music historian Horst Bergmeier, who authored (with Rainier Lotz) Hitler's Airwaves, a reference to Nazi swing music.

According to music critic Will Friedwald, "The surviving recordings of Charlie and His Orchestra (many of which are included in a four-CD boxed set titled "Swing Tanzen Verboten!: Swing Music and Nazi Propaganda," released by the British Proper label in 2003) are equal parts pathetic and disturbing..."

According to Bergmeier, Schwedler remained in Berlin after most of the rest of his orchestra (including Lutz Templin, who remained a respected musician after the war) were evacuated to Stuttgart in 1943. Saxophone player Teddy Kleindin recalled Schwedler working as a croupier in Berlin after the Nazi defeat in 1945. After briefly settling in Bavaria and Düsseldorf, Schwedler (along with wife and two children, Bernd and Scarlet) emigrated to the United States in August 1960, after which he passed into obscurity. According to an article in Der Spiegel, Schwedler became a successful businessman and retired to Tegernsee, Bavaria, where he died in 1973.

== Other sources ==
- Morley, Nathan. Radio Hitler: Nazi Airwaves in the Second World War. Amberley, 2021. ISBN 1398104469
- Hitler's Airwaves, Horst J. P. Bergmeier and Rainier E. Lotz (Yale University Press, 1997)
- Kater, Michael H. Different Drummers: Jazz in the Culture of Nazi Germany. New York: Oxford University Press, 1992.
