= Gery Scott =

British singer (1923–2005)

Gery Scott (5 October 1923 – 14 December 2005) was a jazz and cabaret entertainer and teacher, whose performing career spanned 26 countries and over 60 years. She was noted for her powerful stage persona and engaging delivery, with material ranging from the songbooks of Cole Porter, George Gershwin, Irving Berlin, Harold Arlen, Lorenz Hart, Cy Coleman and all the "standards" as well as Noël Coward and some pop material. Whilst she was well known to British audiences during the later part of the Second World War, she achieved most of her fame outside the UK.

== Early life ==
Born Diana Geraldine Whitburn in Bombay, British India, in 1923 – a child of the 'Raj' – she made her first recording in Calcutta for Indian Columbia in 1942 singing "Stormy Weather" accompanied by Teddy Weatherford and his band.

She then went on to work with various BBC bands in London including Harry Gold and His Pieces of Eight and The Vic Lewis Big Band. Scott also spent the war years with the American Red Cross entertaining the American Armed Forces in Burma and India.

She was married three times: to the late World War II RAF pilot Pat Lofting (later personal pilot to the Raja of Bengal), to musical director and pianist Igo Fischer (now living in Germany) and finally, to oil magnate Tony Diamond, who was murdered in England in 1986.

== Fame in the Eastern Bloc ==
From 1950 to 1957, she toured Europe performing with such artists as Woody Herman, Bud Shank, Chet Baker and Gerry Mulligan. This tour led to a recording contract with Czech-based Supraphon, during that time she recorded from 1957 to 1960 eighty titles, released as either albums or singles, accompanied by orchestras under the direction of Gustav Brom, Karel Vlach and Dalibor Brazda, with some arrangements written by her musical director and pianist, Igo Fischer.

Scott was the first Western jazz singer to tour the then Soviet Union, selling over three million records there in 1961 and was invited to sing "How High the Moon" during her concert at the Kiev Opera House, to coincide with the launch in 1961 of the Sputnik flight that would see cosmonaut Yuri Gagarin as the first human in space. Scott married her musical director, Igo Fischer at the British Embassy in Moscow that same year. Her Russian activities created headlines in Britain and saw her included in the BBC Panorama episode on Moscow.

== Parlophone ==
In 1962, Beatles manager George Martin signed her to Parlophone, with hits including "This is Life", "The Dum de de Dum Song", "Summer Love" and "Stay With Me" (allegedly a plagiarized version of a Georgian song "Tbiliso". Music written by Revaz Lagidze in 1958). Later that year she moved to Hong Kong and opened her own recording company, Orbit Records. That same year, she was appointed entertainment director for the Hilton Hotel Far East Chain and from 1966 to 1970 managed the Cats Eye and The Eye nightclubs in Bangkok and Singapore.

== Australia ==
Scott moved to Australia in 1980 and continued to perform to jazz and cabaret audiences in Canberra, Sydney and Melbourne. She appeared as "Alice" in the Australian television soap opera Prisoner in 1983. She was twice the recipient of the coveted Canberra Critics Circle Award, firstly in 1992 for her production of the CD Together by The Vocal Group and for her outstanding performances in Gery Scott Sings Mostly Coward and Particularly Porter at Queanbeyan's School of Arts Café, and then again in 2005 for services to entertainment and to teaching. 2002 marked her 60th anniversary in show business.

Scott attained a Masters in Music from the Canberra Institute of the Arts in 1998, where she had been head of the Vocal Jazz Department since 1985. She retired from that position at the end of 2002. One of her greatest achievements at the institute was the formation of the Vocal Jazz Ensemble, as well as the training of hundreds of students in singing and performance technique, many of whom are now well established in the Australian and international jazz scene.

== Final performances ==
Her final performances included the 2003 Sydney Cabaret Convention where she received two standing ovations for her performances of the jazz anthem "Something Cool" and Stephen Sondheim's "Send in the Clowns". Dr David Schwartz, writing for Cabaret Hotline Online said in his review, "It is hard to describe her to you without sounding as if I were a little bit insane. Her performance provided me with one of those life-changing and totally defining cabaret experiences that was instantly committed to memory, along with my first exposure to Mabel Mercer, Julie Wilson, Sarah Vaughan, Sylvia Syms and a host of other greats. Gery Scott's set represented that rare moment in cabaret when the singer and her song are indistinguishable. This sort of alchemy comes only after many years; to witness it is to be blessed". She was also special guest in a 2003 Sondheim review, and two fund raising concerts for fellow performers in 2004.

Her last major expose was in the form of a biographical essay in The New Yorker magazine, 18 & 25 August 2003 entitled "The Jazz Singer", by Larissa MacFarquhar.

At the age of 82 and in a wheelchair, Scott gave her very last performance on 9 October 2005 at the Hyatt Hotel Canberra, accompanied by her longtime pianist in Australia, Tony Magee, where her wish to do 'just one more gig' was ably delivered with a sparkling opener of Got A lot Of Livin' to Do, and later in the concert, with pianist Wayne Kelly, a moving version of Body And Soul.

== Death ==
Gery Scott was diagnosed with lung cancer in September 2005. She died at Clare Holland House Hospice, Canberra, Australia, on 14 December 2005.

== The music continues ==
In September 2006, Czech recording label Producentské centrum Františka Rychtaříka released the CD Gery Scott & Gustav Brom, a reissue of selections recorded by Supraphon in Prague in 1957.

In 2011, Supraphon released two Gery Scott albums on iTunes: Gery Scott – Old Devil Moon and Anglicky zpiva Gery Scott (Gery Scott sings in English).

== Discography ==
78 rpm discs

- "Stormy Weather" 1942

LP records

- Anglicky Zpívá Gery Scott – 1959 (export releases under titles: Hit Parade (Listening To Gery Scott) and Let Us Dance)
- Modern Jazz Studio No 1 1964 (as guest)
- Modern Jazz Studio No 1/2 1986 (as guest)

EP / 45 rpm

- "Sings Cole Porter" 1950s
- "Sings..." 1950s
- "And Gustav Brom Vol 1" 1950s
- "Supraphon Plays" 1958
- "And Gustav Brom Vol 2" 1950s
- "Your Charleston" 1950s
- "Dixie and Charleston" 1950s
- "Sings with Karel Vlach Orchestra" 1957
- "Sings New Songs with Karel Vlach Orchestra" 1957
- "This is Life" / "The Dum de Dum Song" 1961
- "Summer Love" / "Stay With Me" 1961
- "Sings Hong Kong" / "What Kind of Fool Am I" 1962
- "Hit Parade Dance Songs" 1960s
- "Listening to Gery Scott II" 1960s
- "With Gustav Brom Orchestra" 1960s
- "Jeepers Creepers" 1960s
- "Ain't Misbehavin'" 1960s
- "Come Dance With Me" 1960s
- "Sings Charleston" 1960s
- "Gery Scott Sings" 1960s
- "Sings Songs You like" 1960s

CD's

- A Lot of Livin' 1998
- Gery Scott & Gustav Brom 2006

iTunes releases

- Anglicky zpiva Gery Scott 2011
- Gery Scott – Old Devil Moon 2011
