= Templin (disambiguation) =

Templin is a small town in Germany.

Templin may refer to:

- Templin Hall, a residence hall at the University of Kansas
- Templin, Queensland, a locality that features a historical museum in Queensland, Australia
- Templin Highway, a two-lane road in the United States
- Treaty of Templin, a treaty signed in 1317 ending a war between the Margraviate of Brandenburg and Denmark

== People named Templin ==
- Jean Templin (born 1928), former French football player
- Lutz Templin (1901–1973), German jazz bandleader
- Templin Potts (1855–1927), 11th Naval Governor of Guam
- Wolfgang Templin (born 1948), former politician of the democratic opposition in East Germany
