= Gustav Brom =

Slovak musician and composer (1921–1995)

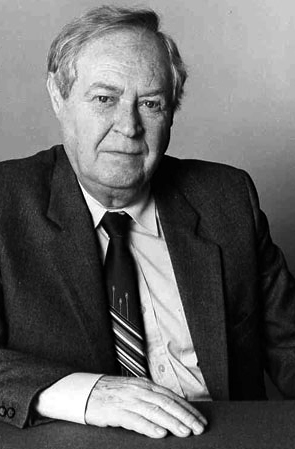
Gustav Brom

Gustav Brom (22 May 1921 – 25 September 1995) was a Slovak-Czech big band leader, arranger, clarinetist and composer.

He achieved fame in Europe and abroad from the 1940s right through to his death in 1995. He worked prolifically and was noted for remaining true to the jazz big band idiom, beginning with Dixieland and swing and later, with contributions from his musicians, moving into the West Coast jazz sound.

== Biography ==
Born Gustav Frkal on 22 May 1921 in Veľké Leváre, in the Bratislava Region of Czechoslovakia. his and the band's first professional engagement was in June 1940 in the Radhošť Hotel in Rožnov pod Radhoštěm Shortly after World War II, Brom's band performed in Brno and Bratislava and also for several months in 1947 in Switzerland. Other top big band leaders in Prague at this time included Karel Vlach and Kamil Běhounek. Brom triumphed in 1955 at the Leipzig Fair, in the former East Germany, winning accolades for his outstanding arrangements.

The 1950s saw Brom signed with Supraphon in Prague, recording and arranging prolifically with many guest artists including British singer Gery Scott, Czech singers Karel Gott, Helena Vondráčková and Hana and Petr Ulrych (aka Ulrychovi) and Greek sisters Tena and Martha Elefteriadu.

He died in Brno on 25 September 1995.

== International recognition ==
In the 1960s Brom's band was rated one of the top ten big-bands in the world by the American jazz polls. Maynard Ferguson, Dizzy Gillespie, Diana Ross & the Supremes, Ray Conniff, Ben Cramer, Bill Ramsey and others joined the Gustav Brom Big Band in many concerts and performances and the band's name became well known and respected among professional performers as well as the discerning public.

Brom was honoured in 1993 with the Luděk Hulan Jazz Award, presented yearly by the Czech Jazz Society, Prague.

== Legacy ==
With Brom's death in 1995, the band started a new phase under a slightly changed name, conducted by Vladimír Valovič from the Slovakian capital, Bratislava. Valovič was appointed by Brom himself as successor. New members have joined from the Czech cities of Prague, Brno, Olomouc and Ostrava, and also from Bratislava.

Since June 1940, Gustav Brom's big-band's name has appeared on over 570 music records, of both Czech and foreign origin, and the post-war recordings are becoming of interest to record collectors and music lovers worldwide. In September 2006, Czech recording label Producentské centrum Františka Rychtaříka released the CD Gery Scott & Gustav Brom, a reissue of selections recorded by Supraphon in Prague in 1957.

== Discography ==
- 1961: Jazz in der Tschechoslovakei (Supraphon SUC 15388)
- 1962: Jazz Souvenirs (Supraphon, SUK 35545) single B-side only, A-side consists of music by János Kőrössy & Studio 5
- 1966: Československý jazz 1965 (Supraphon DV 1023) various artists (including Jan Hammer, Karel Velebný and others)
- 1967: Jazzovy Concert (Supraphon 150478)
- 1967: Swinging The Jazz (MPS Records)
- 1969: Missa Jazz (MPS Records)
- 1969: Maynard + Gustav (Supraphon, 1 15 0716, Los Grandes del JAZZ Sarpe 85), Maynard Ferguson and Gustav Brom Orchestra
- 1976: Polymelomodus (Supraphon)
- 1976: Mini Jazz Klub vol.3 in memoriam Josef Blaha (Panton, 330388)
- 1976: Plays for you pop, jazz and swing (Opus 91150447)
