= Together Again (Emil Viklický and George Mraz album) =

2014 studio album by Emil Viklický and George Mraz

Studio album by Emil Viklický and George Mraz
- Released: 28 February 2014
- Recorded: 16 and 17 January 2013
- Genre: Jazz
- Label: ACT Music
- Producer: Siggi Loch

Emil Viklický and George Mraz chronology
Moravian Gems (2007)	Together Again (2014)

Professional ratings
Review scores
Source	Rating
The Guardian	4/5 stars
All About Jazz	4/5 stars

Together Again is a collaborative album by pianist Emil Viklický and bassist George Mraz. Both these musicians are from the Czech Republic, but Mraz has lived in the US since the 1960s. Recorded at Realistic Sound Studio, it was produced by Siggi Loch and mixed by Klaus Scheuermann.

== Track listing ==
1. "Dear Lover"
2. "Poem"
3. "Theme From 5th Part of Sinfonietta"
4. "A Bird Flew By"
5. "U Dunaja u Prešpurka"
6. "Austerlitz"
7. "Moon, Sleeping in a Cradle"
8. "Thank You, Laca"
9. "Up on a Fir Tree"
10. "I Saw Grey Pidgeon"
11. "In Holomóc Town"

== Personnel ==
- Emil Viklický: piano
- George Mraz: acoustic bass
