= Emil Viklický =

Czech jazz pianist and composer (born 1948)

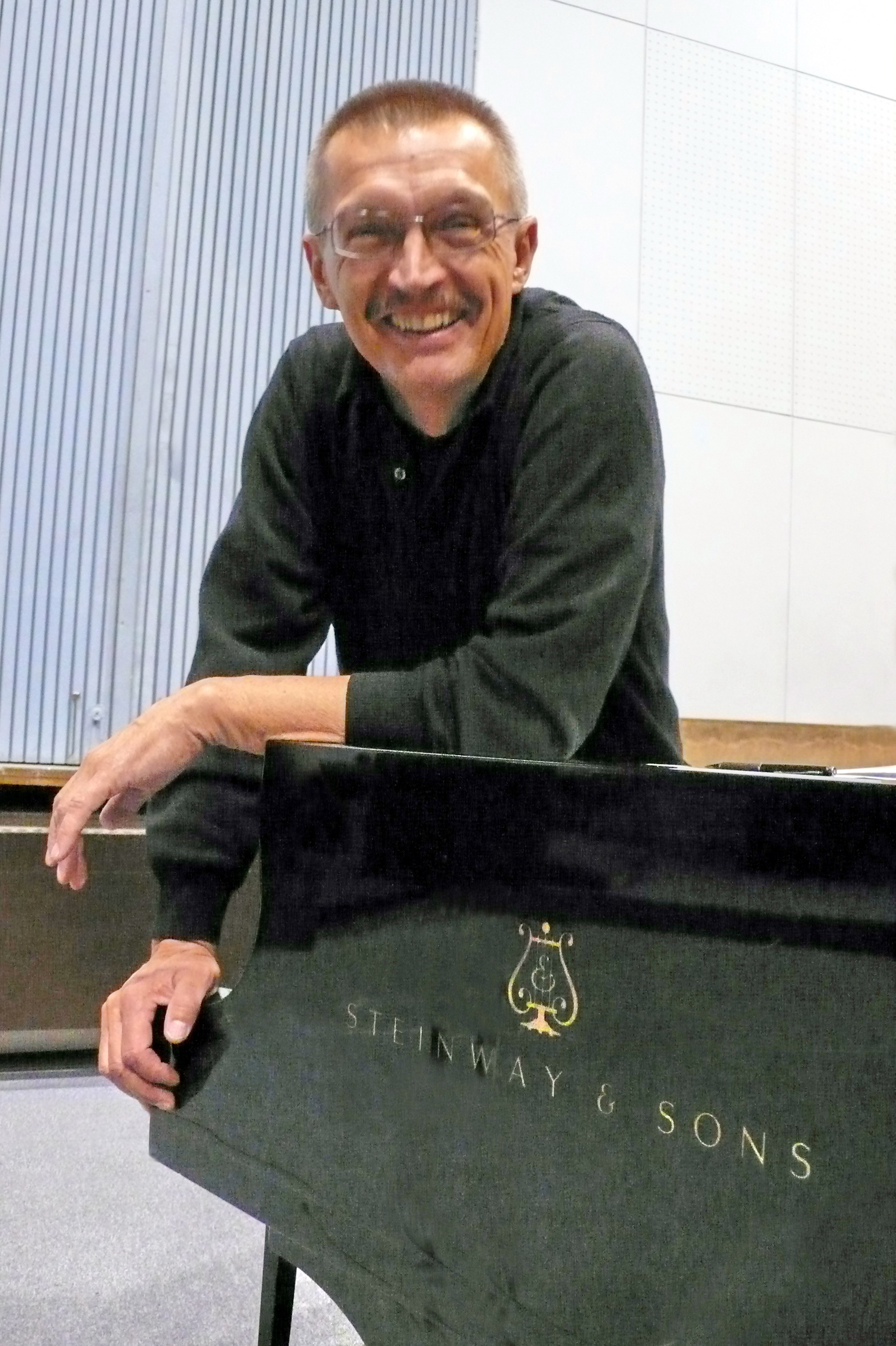
- Viklický in 2007

Background information
- Born: 23 November 1948 (age 77); Olomouc, Czechoslovakia
- Genres: Jazz
- Occupations: Musician; composer
- Instrument: Piano
- Website: viklicky.com

Emil Viklický (born 23 November 1948) is a Czech jazz pianist and composer.

== Career ==
Viklický was born in Olomouc. He graduated from Palacký University in 1971 with a degree in mathematics. As a student, he devoted a lot of time to playing jazz piano, and in 1974, he was awarded the prize for best soloist at the Czechoslovak Amateur Jazz Festival. The same year, he joined Karel Velebný's SHQ ensemble. In 1976, he was a prizewinner at a jazz improvisation competition in Lyon, and his composition "Green Satin" (Czech: Zelený satén) won first prize in a music conservatory competition in Monaco. In 1985, his composition "Cacharel" won second prize in the same competition.

In 1977, he was awarded a year's scholarship to study composition and arrangement with Herb Pomeroy at Berklee College of Music in Boston. He then continued his composition studies with Jarmo Sermila, George Crumb, and Václav Kučera. Since returning to Prague, he has led his own ensembles (primarily quartets and quintets), composed and arranged, and—after the death of Karel Velebný—worked as director of the Summer Jazz Workshops in Frýdlant. He has lectured at a similar workshop event in Glamorgan, Wales. Between 1991 and 1995, Viklický was President of the Czech Jazz Society, and since 1994, he has worked with the Ad lib Moravia ensemble, whose performances combine elements of Moravian folk music, modern jazz, and contemporary serious music. In 1996, the ensemble went on a concert tour of Mexico and the United States.

=== As a pianist ===
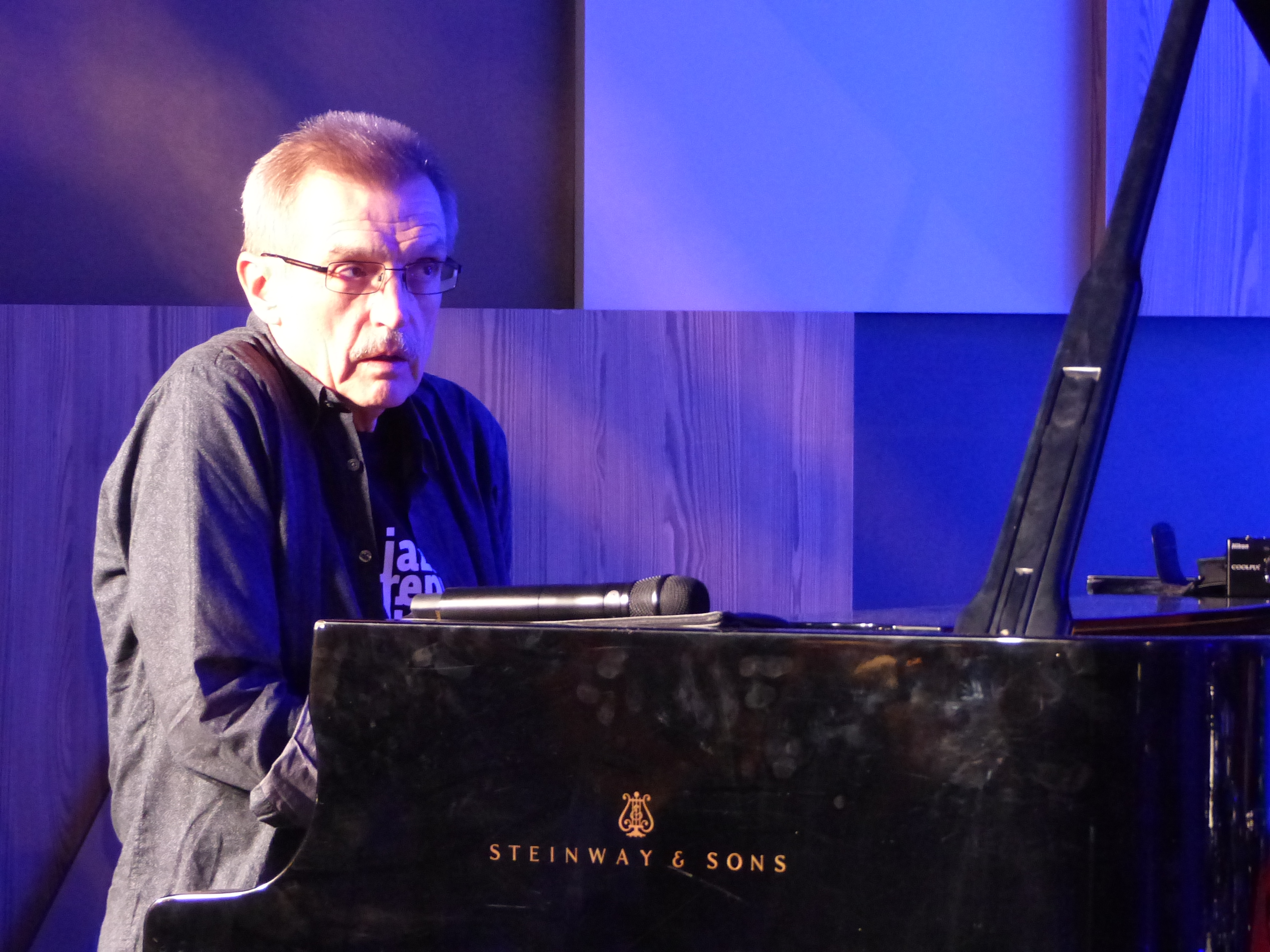
Emil Viklický in Budapest, 2018

As a pianist, Viklický has performed in numerous international ensembles alongside musicians from the U.S. and other European countries, including the Lou Blackburn International Quartet, the Benny Bailey Quintet, and multi-instrumentalist Scott Robinson. He has made frequent appearances in Finland (with the Finnczech Quartet and in particular with Jarmo Sermila) and Norway (with the Czech-Norwegian Big Band and Harald Gundhus), and has performed in the USA, Japan, Mexico, Israel, Germany, Luxembourg, the Netherlands (at the North Sea Festival), and elsewhere. He has also worked with fellow Czech, saxophonist Jaroslav Jakubovič, and often accompanied Czech jazz singer Eva Olmerová, during the last years of her career.

=== As a composer ===
As a composer, Viklický has attracted attention abroad primarily for having created a synthesis of the expressive elements of modern jazz with the melodicism and tonalities of Moravian folk song that is distinctly individual in contemporary jazz. Besides this, however, he also composes "straight-ahead" modern jazz as well as chamber and orchestral works that utilize certain elements of New Music, and at times his music requires a combination of classical and jazz performers. He also composes incidental and film music and has produced scores for several full-length feature films, such as the German horror comedy Killer Condom, and television series. Throughout the 1990s, he devoted an increasing amount of time to the composition of contemporary classical music for a great variety of instrumental combinations, ranging from small chamber ensembles and electronic instruments to symphony orchestras and choruses.

== Awards ==
Viklický's work has gained him a number of awards. These include second prize in the 1985 Monaco jazz composition competition (for "Cacharel"), the 1991 Film and Television Association prize for music for animated film, second prize at the 1994 Marimolin contemporary music competition in Boston (for "Tristana"), a 1996 Prague award for electroacoustic music (for "Paradise Park"), a 1996 Czech Music Fund prize for use of folk music in art music, and first prize in a 2000 international composition competition in Prague (for the opera Phaedra).

== Selected discography ==
- Okno (Supraphon 1980; reissued on Bonton 1997)
- Together (Supraphon 1981; reissued 1996)
- Confluence (Jasemusiikki Finland 1983; reissued 1995)
- Dveře = Door (Supraphon 1985; reissued as Okno & Dveře / Door & Window on Bonton 1997)
- Homage to Joan Miró (Supraphon 1988; reissued 1989)
- Beyond the Mountains (Supraphon 1990)
- Tauromaquia (Bonton 1990)
- 'Round Midnight (Arta 1991)
- Last Connection from Niirasaki (Monitor/EMI 1995)
- Food of Love (Melantrich 1995; reissued Lotos 1998)
- Homage to Josip Plecnik (Lotos 1996; reissued 2004)
- Bohemia After Dark (PJ Music 1997)
- UV Drive (Arta 1997)
- Neuro (Gallup Music 1998)
- Duets (Lotos 1998)
- Docela všední obyčejný den (Lotos 1998)
- Live in Rudolfinum (PJ Music 2001)
- Morava (Fantasy/Milestone 2001)
- Trio '01 (Arta 2002)
- What's New (Cube-Métier 2003)
- Summertime (Cube-Métier 2004)
- Cookin' in Bonn (Dekkor 2006)
- Moravian Gems (Cube-Métier 2007)
- Jazz Night at the Museum (DMcP 2007)
- Jazz at Prague Castle (Multisonic 2007)
- Ballads and More (Arta 2008)
- Sinfonietta – The Janáček of Jazz (Venus 2009)
- The Funky Way of Emil Viklicky (Vampi Soul 2009)
- Emil Viklicky 60 (Multisonic 2009)
- Vítáme Vás (DMcP 2009)
- Live in Vienna (Cube-Métier, 2010)
- Kafka on the Shore: Tribute to Haruki Murakami (Venus, 2011)
- Together Again with George Mraz (ACT Music, 2014)
- Moravian Romance: Live at JazzFest Brno 2018 (Venus, 2018) with Miroslav Vitous

== Gallery ==
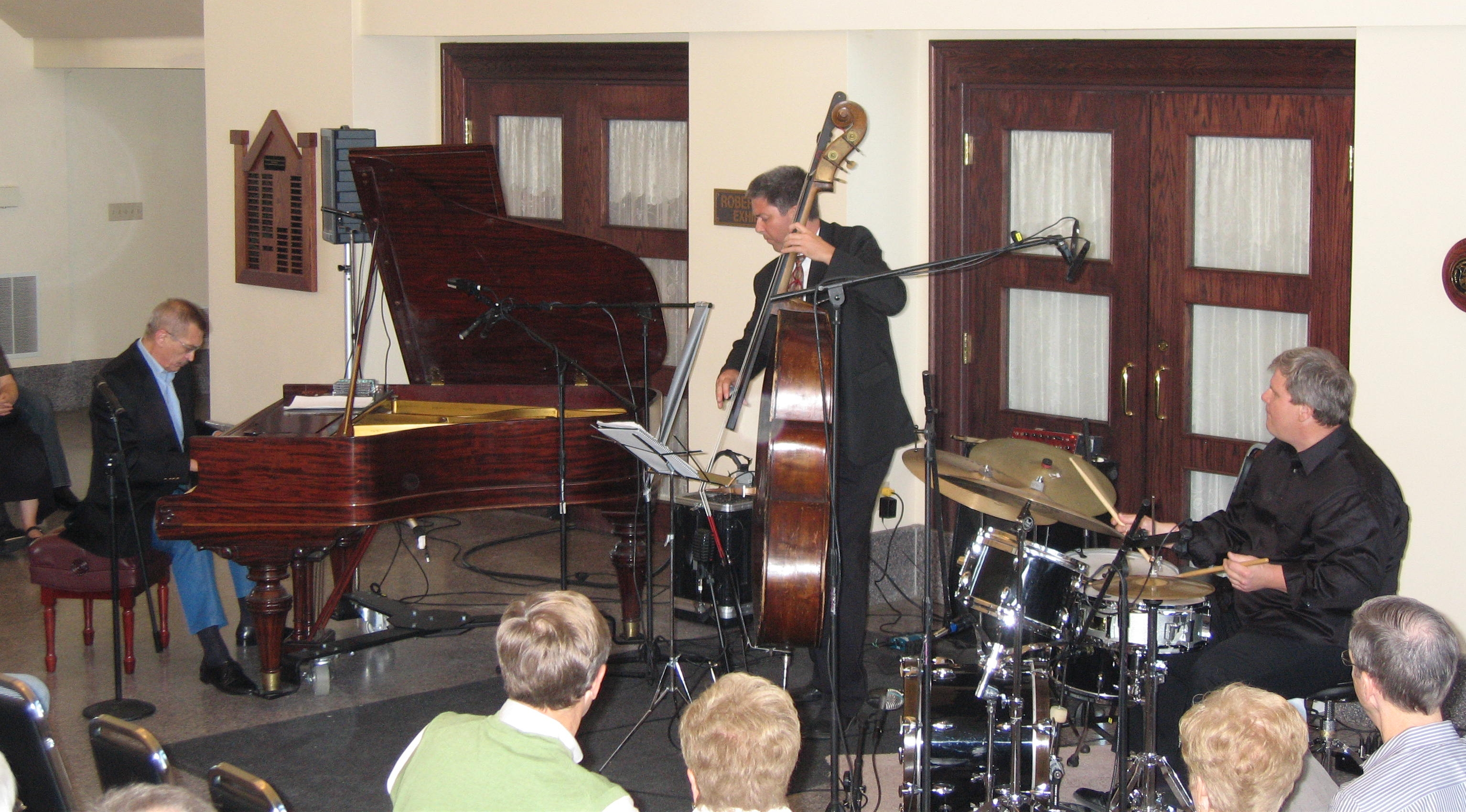
Viklicky at the National Czech and Slovak Museum, Cedar Rapids, Iowa, August 2006

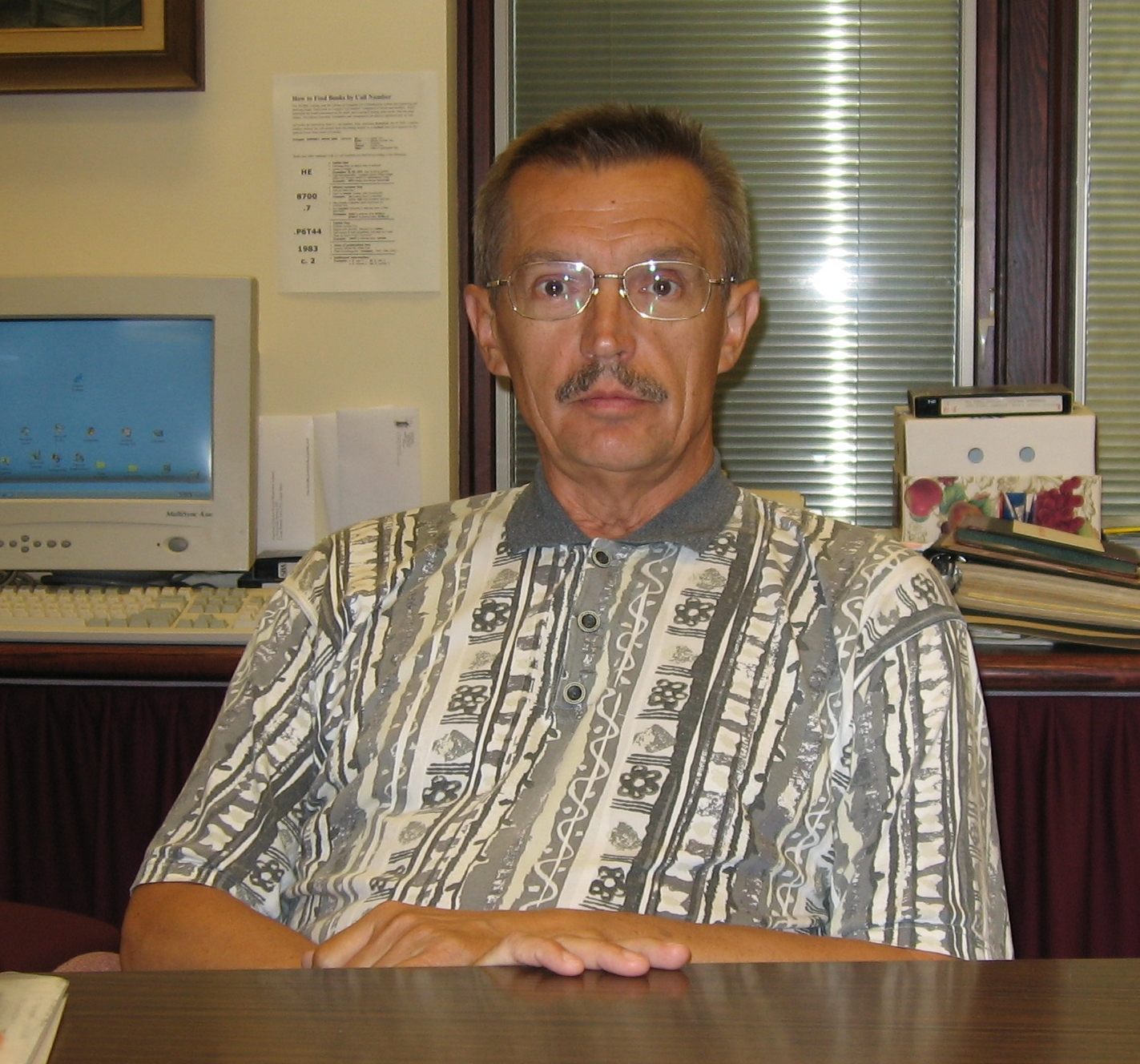
Viklicky at the National Czech and Slovak Museum, August 2006

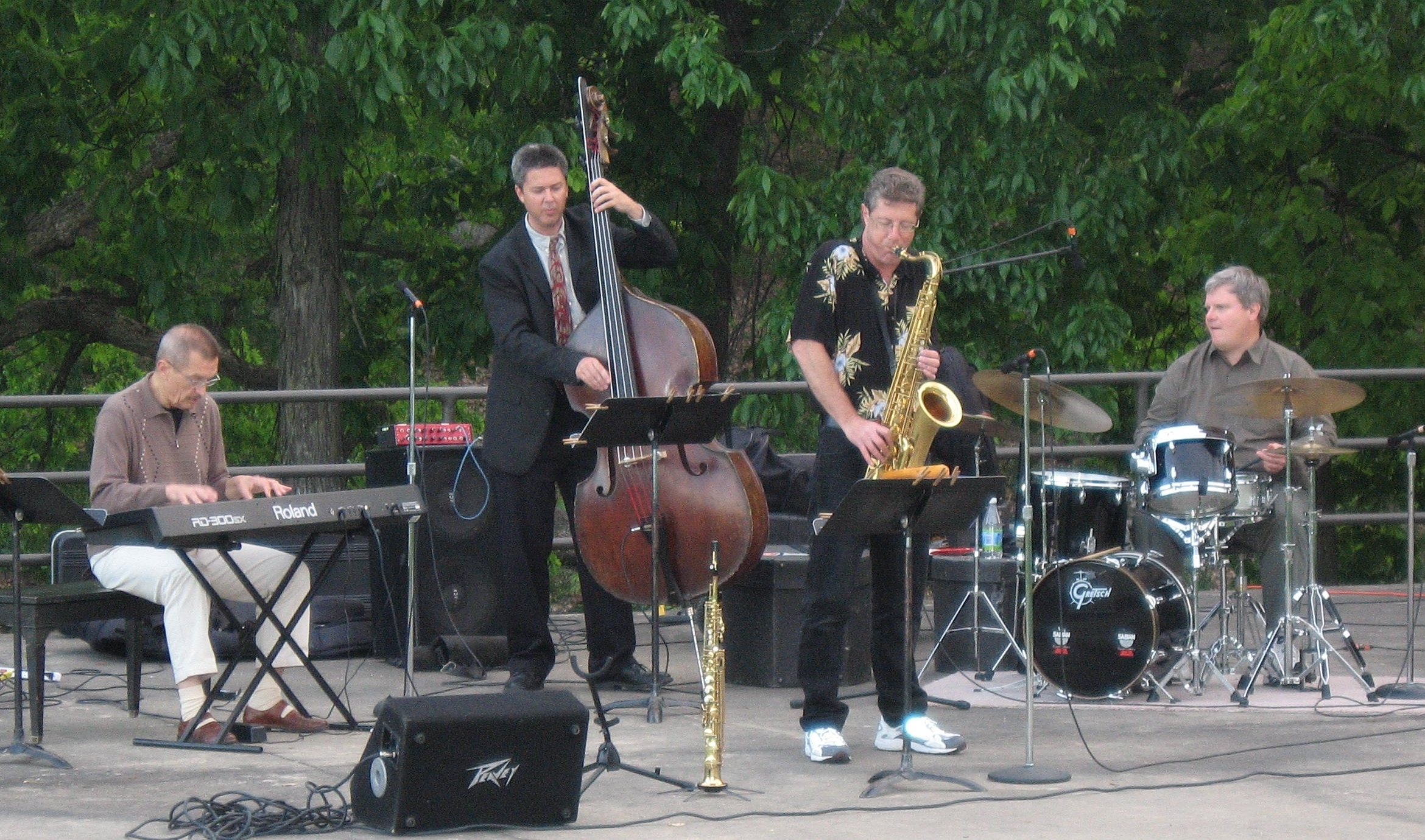
Viklicky at the Indian Hills Community College, Ottumwa, Iowa, 5/28/2008

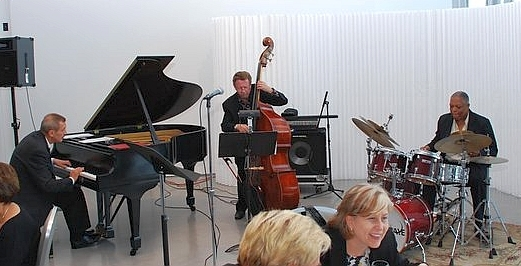
Viklicky with George Mraz and Billy Hart at the Spertus Museum, Chicago, September 2008

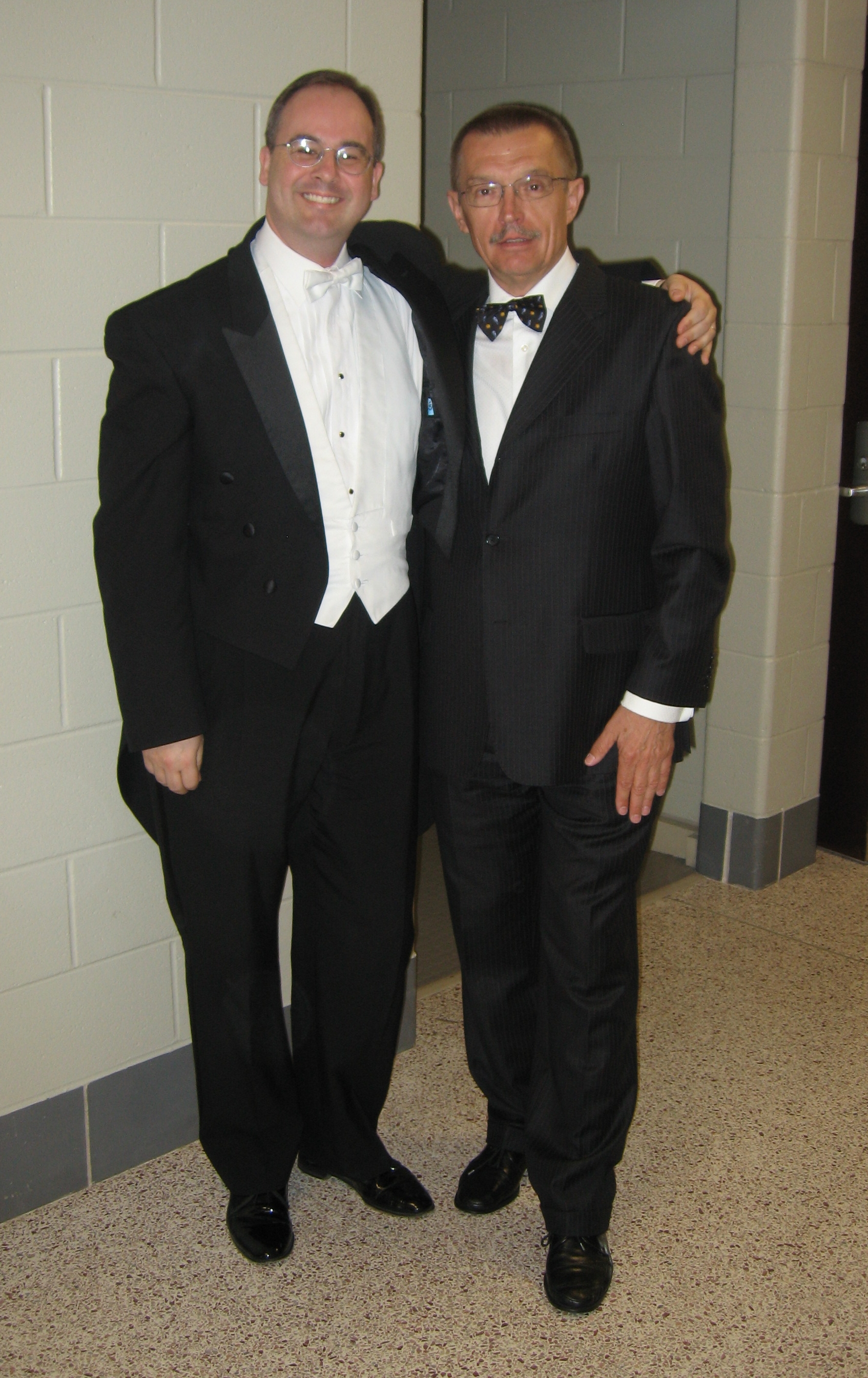
Tim Hankewich and Viklicky in Iowa City, Iowa, May 2009

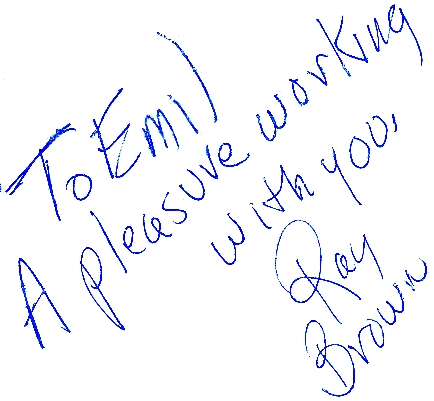
Inscription from Ray Brown to Emil Viklicky
