= Karel Krautgartner =

- Czech clarinetist and saxophonist Karel Krautgartner

Background information
- Born: Karel Krautgartner; July 20, 1922; Mikulov, Czechoslovakia
- Died: September 20, 1982 (aged 60) Cologne, West Germany
- Genres: Jazz; Classical music
- Occupations: Clarinetist; Composer; Bandleader
- Instruments: Clarinet, Saxophone

Karel Krautgartner (July 20, 1922 – September 20, 1982) was a Czech jazz and classical clarinetist, saxophonist, arranger, composer, conductor and teacher.

== Life ==
=== Musical education ===
He was born in Mikulov, Moravia, in the family of a postmaster. His family were of Moravian German ethnic which have assimilated into Czech people. In 1930 he began to play the piano. In 1935, after moving to Brno, he found interest mainly in the radio broadcasting and specially in jazz. He began to study clarinet on private basis with Stanislav Krtička (a notable Czech clarinetist of the first half of 20th century, he performed the demanding part of the Concertino by Leoš Janáček at the composer's request at the festival of contemporary music in Frankfurt am Main in 1926).

=== Work as a lecturer in Germany ===
Krautgartner acquired the necessary skills of clarinet playing, and also inherited a "fanatic passion" for clarinet construction and components (reeds, mouthpieces, barrels). He later used his knowledge of wind instruments as a lecturer at German universities in Cologne and Düsseldorf. In 1936, Krautgartner founded the student orchestra Quick band. In 1942, he signed his first professional contract as a saxophonist in the Gustav Brom orchestra in the hotel Passage in Brno.

=== Dixie Club ===
In 1943 he gradually created Dixie Club and started to arrange in the Benny Goodman and Glenn Miller styles. During 1945 - 1955, the core of the Dixie Club moved gradually to Prague and became a part of Karel Vlach orchestra. Krautgartner achieved a privileged position as the leader of saxophone section and started to contribute with his own compositions.

=== Leader of a quintet ===
In 1956, he founded Karel Krautgartner Quintet, along with Karel Velebný. The group played in various line-ups modern jazz, swing, dixieland and accompanied popular singers. From 1958 to 1960 he performed with the All star band, an orchestra playing in west-coast style, and with Studio 5, (dixieland band, won the 1st place in the category of small orchestras at 7ht Youth Festival in Vienna, 1959).

=== Orchestra head and emigration ===
Between 1960 and 1968 he became the head of the Taneční orchestr Československého rozhlasu (Dance Orchestra of Czechoslovakia Radio). In 1967 the orchestra was renamed to Karel Krautgartner Orchestra. In 1968, after the Soviet invasion of Czechoslovakia, he emigrated to Vienna, Austria and became the chief conductor of the 0RF Bigband.

In 1970, he moved to Cologne, West Germany where in 1971 he founded the seminar for popular music at the Rhenish Music School, received his doctorate and, as a professor at the music academy, prepared the establishment of the jazz course. Meanwhile in Czechoslovakia, efforts were being made to remove all traces of his work, and the recordings of his works in the radio archives there were erased. He died in Cologne in 1982.

== Recordings ==
Jazz

- Případ ještě nekončí CD. Prague, RADIOSERVIS. FR 0131-2http://www.radioservis-as.cz/katalog/zbozi.php?detail=954
- Karel Krautgartner a Jazzový orchestr Čs. rozhlasu CD. Prague, RADIOSERVIS. FR 0132-2
- Docela všední, obyčejný den CD. Prague, RADIOSERVIS. FR 0179-2
- Jazz kolem Karla Krautgartnera LP. (Supraphon 1965)

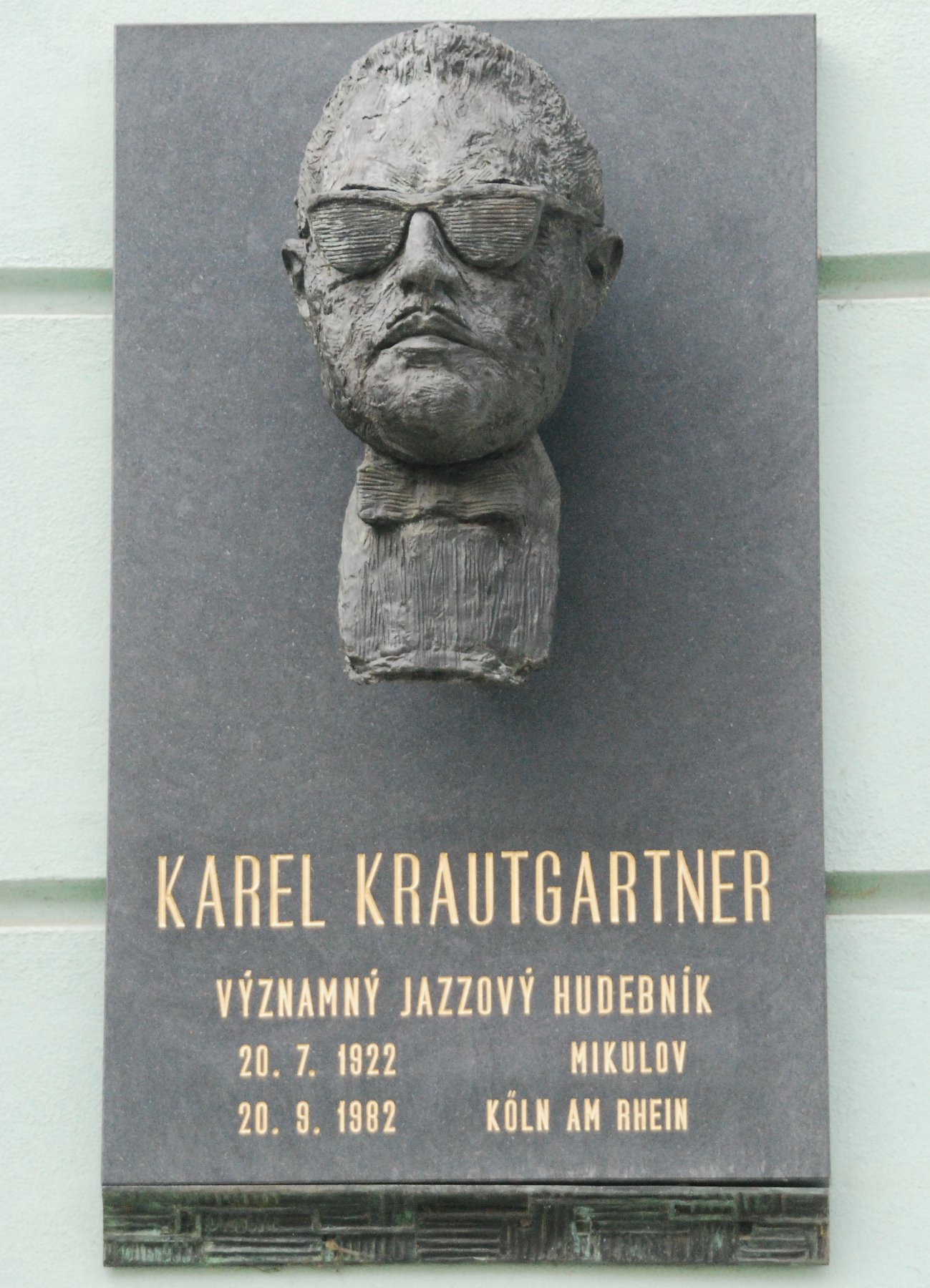
Karel Krautgartner, memorial plaque in Mikulov.

Classical

- Stravinsky: L' Histoire du Soldat, Octet for Winds, Symphony for Winds, Ebony Concerto... CD. Supraphon SU 3168-2 911, 1999.
- Glazunov: Saxophone Concerto. CD. Supraphon Archive SU 3968-2, 2009.
