= Prague International Jazz Festival =

Annual jazz festival in Prague, Czech Republic

Prague International Jazz Festival (Czech: Mezinárodní jazzový festival Praha) is a traditional jazz festival held annually in Reduta Jazz Club, in Prague, Czech Republic established in 1964.

== History ==
Prague International Jazz Festival is the oldest music festival in the Czech Republic and also one of the oldest and most traditional ones in Europe. It became an autumn tradition as an equivalent to the Prague Spring International Music Festival of classical music, which is held in the beginning of the year.

Musicians who have performed at the festival include Mr. Acker Bilk & his Bristol Paramount Jazz Band (1964 & 1982), Rahsaan Roland Kirk (1967), Duke Ellington Orchestra (1968), Count Basie Orchestra & Oscar Peterson & Big Joe Turner (1974), Benny Goodman (1976), Didier Lockwood (1984), Stéphane Grappelli (1988), B.B. King (1990), Chick Corea Elektric Band (1991), Dave Brubeck Quartet (1996), Tony Bennett & Ralph Sharon Trio (1997), New York Voices (1998), Mal Waldron and Albert Mangelsdorff (2001), Rhoda Scott (2006), Boris Kozlov (2013).

== See also ==
- Designblok
