= Karel Velebný =

Czech jazz musician (1931–1989)

Background information
- Born: March 17, 1931; Prague, Czechoslovakia
- Died: March 7, 1989 (aged 57)
- Genres: Jazz
- Occupation: Musician
- Instruments: Vibraphone, piano, saxophone

Karel Velebný (17 March 1931 – 7 March 1989, Prague) was a Czech jazz musician, composer, arranger, actor, writer and music pedagogue. Velebný was one of the founders of modern Czech jazz in the second half of the 20th century.

== Biography ==
At 7 years old, Velebný played piano and at 15—already a modern jazz enthusiast—taught himself to play alto saxophone. He graduated from gymnasium then studied drumming at the Prague Conservatory. He made his first public performance as a student, and became a full-time professional as soon as he graduated. From 1955 to 1958 he played with Czech jazzman Karel Krautgartner's orchestra, then joined contrabassist Luděk Hulan to co-found Studio 5, which became the key ensemble of modern Czech jazz. He continued to work with Krautgartner until the latter emigrated in 1968.

In 1960, the Studio 5 ensemble was absorbed by the Taneční orchestr Československého rozhlasu (Dance Orchestra of Czechoslovakia Radio), but Velebný and the original Studio 5 members soon quit. In 1961, Velebný and flautist Jan Konopásek co-founded SHQ, initially part of the Spejbl and Hurvínek Theatre (thus Spejbl and Huvínek Quintet), but later extending into independent performances. It became one of the most important bands in Czech jazz history. Velebný was its leader, composer, arranger, played as a multi-instrumentalist and taught the younger band members. SHQ's instrumental line-up and membership changed frequently. Later, Velebný was diagnosed with a serious heart disease and was forced to quit as a saxophonist and vibraphonist. In his later years, his instrumental role was mainly restricted to piano.

Karel Velebný played with various Czech jazz ensembles, including Kamil Hála's orchestra, the Linha Singers ensemble and occasionally with Gustav Brom's Big Band. Jiří Stivín, Luděk Hulan, František Uhlíř, Rudolf Dašek, Josef Vejvoda, and Jan Konopásek were among his regular collaborators. Velebný and S+HQ also accompanied Eva Olmerová on her first studio album The Jazz Feeling.

As a composer, Velebný concentrated solely on jazz, in compositional styles and arrangements reminiscent of Gerry Mulligan, Chick Corea, Gary Burton and Benny Golson. He wrote mainly for his own ensembles (notably Studio 5 and SHQ) but also for the Kamil Hála Orchestra, the Karel Vlach Orchestra and others. His oeuvre comprises over 200 compositions, which include his prolific contributions to film music.

Velebný was also a founder and leader of specialised Czech jazz pedagogy in the 1970s. In 1978 he was invited to the Berklee College of Music, where he studied jazz teaching and the different approaches of European and American jazz. He organized and led the Summer Jazz Workshop in Frýdlant until his death in 1989. As a teacher, Velebný emphasised knowledge of techniques which could be broadly applied on jazz standards. He also wrote the specialist jazz textbook Jazzová praktika (The Jazz Practical).

Velebný contributed significantly to Czech theatre. He co-founded the Jára Cimrman Theatre, under the pseudonym dr. Evžen Hedvábný (actually, Karel Velebný has invented Jára Cimrman as a polyhistor and a Greatest Czech of all centuries), and made occasional onstage appearances - as an actor - during its early days.

== Discography ==
- untitled LP (DV 10 164, SH Quintet, Supraphon).
- Poezie a jazz II (Supraphon 1965). (Poetry and Jazz II)
- SHQ a přátelé (Supraphon 1965). (SHQ and Friends)
- SHQ (Supraphon 1966).
- Jak hrál SHQ (Supraphon 1966). (How SHQ played)
- Československý jazz 1966 (Supraphon 1967). (Czechoslovak Jazz)
- Karel Velebný Nonet, SHQ & Woodwinds (SABA 1968).
- SHQ Karel Velebný (ESP 1969).
- Motus (Supraphon 1971).
- Týnom tánom (Supraphon 1971).
- Jazzové nebajky (Panton 1973).
- Parnas – Karel Velebný & SHQ s hosty (Supraphon 1981). (Parnas - Karel Velebný and SHQ with Guests)
- Jazzman Cimrman (Panton 1985).
- S+HQ Karel Velebný & Company (Radioservis CR0398-2)
