= Charlie and his Orchestra =

German propaganda swing band

Charlie and his Orchestra (also referred to as the "Templin band" and "Bruno and His Swinging Tigers") were a Nazi-sponsored German propaganda swing band. Jazz music styles were seen by Nazi authorities as rebellious but, ironically, propaganda minister Joseph Goebbels conceived of using the style in shortwave radio broadcasts aimed initially at the United Kingdom, and later the United States, after the German declaration of war on 11 December 1941.

British listeners heard the band every Wednesday and Saturday at about 9 pm. The importance of the band in the propaganda war was underscored by a BBC survey released after World War II, which indicated that 26.5 percent of all British listeners had at some point heard programs from Germany. The German Propaganda Ministry also distributed their music on 78 rpm records to POW camps and occupied countries.

== History ==
During the 1930s, there was a great demand in Germany for jazz music, especially swing (which included elements of the big band sound). However, such American influences which consisted of African American and some Jewish elements, were viewed as counter to goals of German racial purity; by 1935 they were outlawed, and the Nazis informally labeled it as Negermusik. An underground jazz scene, however, persisted in Berlin. Here, bandleader Lutz Templin and drummer Fritz Brocksieper brought together key swing figures of the late 1930s, including singer Karl Schwedler ("Charlie"), clarinetist Kurt Abraham, and trombone player Willy Berking. They escaped notice by pasting pro-German lyrics over sheet music and using instruments like harpsichords for boogie-woogie rhythms.

During this period, Alfred Rosenberg, the head of the NSDAP Office of Foreign Affairs, and Propaganda Minister Joseph Goebbels proffered conflicting attitudes on jazz. Rosenberg argued that jazz, a foreign musical form with African American origins, contradicted the racial ideology of the Nazi party and so should be banned, imposing this proscription on Gauleiters to carry out. Rosenberg's injunction resulted in local prohibitions of jazz across Germany. Conversely, in April 1940, Goebbels, realizing the role Jazz music could play in the Reich's propaganda machine in wartime, sought to bring Berlin's best jazz musicians into the music-propaganda program, where Charlie and his Orchestra was born. Alongside bringing in jazz musicians from across Germany, Templin had to recruit musicians from German-occupied countries, as many of the German jazz musicians of the interwar period were of Jewish origin and had emigrated or been deported to concentration camps as a result of the regime's virulent anti-Semitism.

As an official Reichsministerium band, the group made over 90 recordings between March 1941 and February 1943. Arrangements were by Templin, Willy Berking and Franz Mück, with lyrics written by the Propagandaministerium. Schwedler was permitted to travel to neutral and occupied countries to collect jazz and dance music, which helped the band and propaganda ministry to produce more recordings. Outside their "official" duties, many band members supplemented their income by playing in underground venues.

During World War II, the German youth retained an interest in swing music despite its prohibition. These youth would take a stance against the militarization of German society and create groups known as schlurfs. Created across Germany, these groups would repurpose propaganda efforts by the Nazi government and listen to propaganda bands like Charlie and his Orchestra due to the ease of access to swing music.

By 1943, Allied aerial bombardment took a toll on German broadcast operations in Berlin; the studio, employees, and musicians were evacuated to southern Germany to perform on the Reichssender Stuttgart radio station. During this transition, they were forced to move to a smaller broadcast studio and slow their operations as Allied bombing raids on Stuttgart escalated. Even when the city finally came under attack by Allied ground forces, the band played jazz hits live on international shortwave radio, as German domestic stations played the "cuckoo" air-raid warning.

Once Stuttgart was captured by the Americans in April 1945, the American-occupation authorities were impressed with their musical talent and commissioned some of the band to play for them. After the war, the musicians reorganized under Fritz Brocksieper with the name Freddie Brocksieper, but were still recognized as "Goebbels' band". They played at US Armed Forces clubs in Stuttgart and Ludwigsburg. Conductor Lutz Templin became one of the founders of the ARD broadcast network. Schwedler (in varying accounts) either emigrated to the US in 1960 or became a businessman who retired at Tegernsee.

== Style ==
The purposes of the band were to encourage German sympathies, draw attention to World War II Allied losses, weaken British and American resolve, belittle Winston Churchill and Franklin D. Roosevelt, convince listeners those leaders are pawns of Jewish interests, demean Black and Jewish people, and convey German dictator Adolf Hitler's messages in an entertaining form. The songs stressed how badly the war was going for the target audience, and how it would be only a matter of time until they would be defeated.

American swing and popular British songs were initially performed true to the originals until the second or third stanza when pro-German lyrics and monologues would be introduced. For example, in the Walter Donaldson hit "You're Driving Me Crazy" Schwedler croons about the confusion of new love; in the third stanza, he continues: "Here is Winston Churchill's latest tear-jerker: Yes, the Germans are driving me crazy / I thought I had brains / But they shot down my planes...". Later, the entire lyric would be modified (clearly based on the original). The band also recorded (unaltered) cover versions of popular songs.

While some of their music was modified or covered by popular songs during the 1940s, they also recorded songs of their own. One of these songs is “Little Sir Echo,” which attacked Winston Churchill while promoting the dominance of the Kriegsmarine’s Submarines. This track also further exemplifies how Charlie and His Orchestra attempted to convince the British people to stop fighting in the war.

Anecdotal accounts indicate that British Prime Minister Winston Churchill enjoyed the broadcasts. There are also anecdotal accounts that the British people found these songs to be comedic, or would listen to a different radio station like the BBC.

Many of the members of Charlie and his Orchestra went on to successful careers in music after the war.

== Lyrical Analysis ==
Cornelius Ryan's nonfiction book about D-Day, The Longest Day, includes a snippet from Schwedler's cover of Louis Armstrong's 1930s hit "I Double Dare You":

I double dare you to venture a raid.
I double dare you to try and invade.
And if your loud propaganda means half of what it says,
I double dare you to come over here.

“Little Sir Echo”

Poor Mr. Churchill, how do you do?
Hello, Hello,
Your famous convoy are not coming through
Hello
German U-boats are making you sore…
You’re always licked, not a victory came through,
Hello…
You’re nice little fellow, but by now you should know
That you never can win this war.

“Makin’ Whoopee”

Another war, another profit, another Jewish Business Trick,
Another season, another reason for makin’ whoopee.
Washington is our ghetto, Roosevelt is our king.
Democracy is our motto. Think of what a war can bring.
We throw our German names away. We are the kikes of USA.
You are the goys, folks.
We are the boys, folks.
We’re making whoopee.

“Blackout Blues” - Based on St. Louis Blues

A Negro from the London docks,
Sings the blackout blues.
I hate to see the evening sun go down.
‘Cause the German, he done bombed the town.
Feeling tomorrow like I feel today.
Feeling tomorrow like I feel today.
I’ll pack my trunk, make my getaway.
That Churchill bad man with his wars
And the things that pulls folks around by his apron strings.
One for Churchill and his bloody war.
I wouldn’t feel as so doggone sore.
Got the Blackout Blues.
Yeah.
Blue as I can be.
That man got a heart like a rock cast in the sea.
He just won’t let folks live as they want to be.
Doggone it.

== Discography ==
Singles & EPs

- “Who’ll Buy My Bublitchky” / “I’ve Got A Pocketful Of Dreams” (Shellac, 10”, 78 RPM) Date Unknown
- “I’ve Got A Feelin’ You’re Foolin’” / “Washing On The Siegfried Line” (Shellic, 10”, 78 RPM) Date Unknown
- “The Continental”(Shellac, 10”, 78 RPM, Mono) Date Unknown

Compilations

- Propaganda Swing Vol. 1 (LP, Comp, Mono) Released 1975
- Propaganda Swing Vol. 2 (LP, Comp, Mono) Released 1975
- Volume 1: German Propaganda Swing 1940 - 1941, Released 1987
- Charlie & His Orchestra Vol. 3: German Propaganda Swing, 1939-1944 (LP, Comp) Released 1988
- Volume 2: German Propaganda Swing 1940-1943 (LP, Comp, Mono) Released 1988
- Vol. 2 - I Got Rhythm - German Propaganda Swing, 1941-1944 (CD, Comp) Released 1991
- Let’s Go Bombing (CD, Comp) Released 2004

== See also ==
- Lord Haw Haw
- Tokyo Rose
- Degenerate art
- Degenerate music
- Ghetto Swingers – Jewish swing band in the Theresienstadt concentration camp
- Swing Kids
- Thanks for the Memory
