= Willy Berking =

German composer and conductor (1910–1979)

- Born: 22 June 1910; Düsseldorf, German Empire
- Died: 21 May 1979 (aged 68); Munich, West Germany
- Occupations: conductor, composer
- Years active: 1937–1979

Willy Berking (22 June 1910 – 21 May 1979) was a German orchestra conductor, trombonist, and composer.

== Career ==
Berking studied music (piano and composition) in Düsseldorf and then in Berlin, where he formed his first big band at the age of 18 in 1928, writing jazz arrangements for the ensemble. In the 1930s he played trombone with various dance and entertainment orchestras including the Goldene Sieben and the Telefunken Swing Orchestra under Heinz Wehner, with whom he went to Berlin in 1934. Towards the end of 1943 he became director of the studio orchestra for Imperial records, known as the "Berking-top series," which were excellent, swinging sides, despite the Nazi party ban on swing music. At the same time he directed the propaganda big band, "Charlie and His Orchestra".

After the end of World War II continued leading bands, which included Benny de Weille and Louis Freichel as sidemen. Berking was musical director for the Eurovision Song Contest 1957 held in Frankfurt am Main, West Germany. As well as conducting the German ensemble, he also conducted the Flemish, Luxembourg and Swiss orchestras. Berking conducted the German ensemble for the Eurovision Song Contest four times 1957, 1963, 1964 and 1966.

Berking died of cancer in 1979.

Cultural offices
Preceded by (Switzerland) Fernando Paggi	Eurovision Song Contest conductor 1957	Succeeded by (Netherlands) Dolf van der Linden
