= Dalibor Brázda =

Czech conductor and composer (1921–2005)

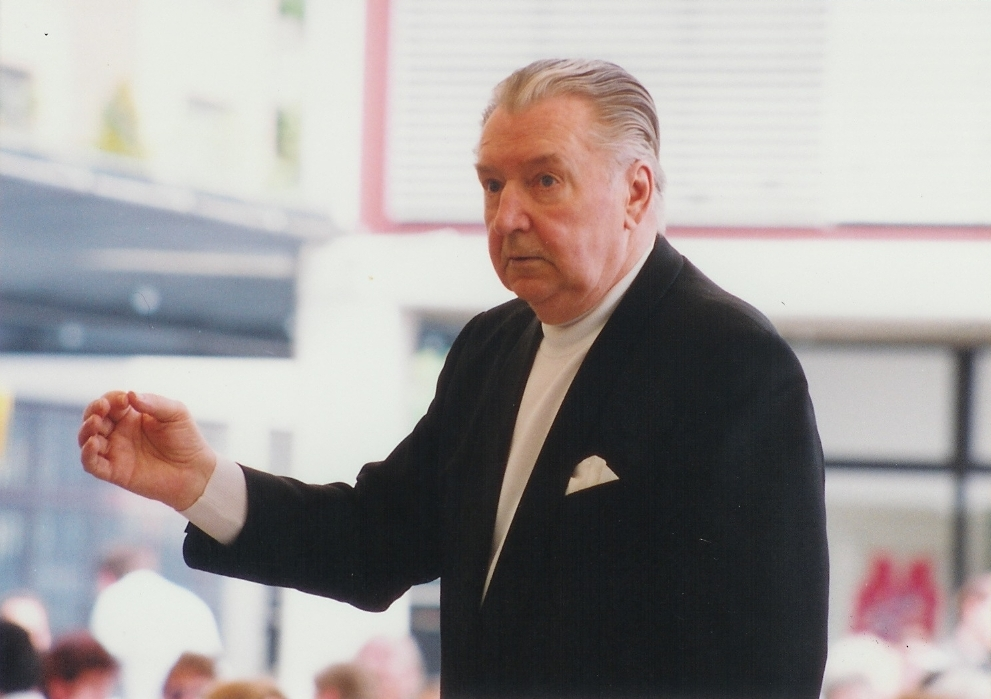
Portrait of Dalibor Brázda

Dalibor Brázda (9 September 1921, Fryšták – 17 August 2005, Dietikon) was a Czech-Swiss music composer, arranger, and conductor.
