= Benny de Weille =

Benny de Weille (March 6, 1915, Lübeck - December 17, 1977, Westerland) was a German swing jazz clarinetist and bandleader.

De Weille studied clarinet under Hans Helmke and was heavily influenced by Benny Goodman, whom he often emulated in his own ensembles. He made recordings with Teddy Stauffer, Hans Rehmstedt, and Willy Berking in the 1930s and 1940s, and from 1940 led his own "Bar Trio". Following the war he worked at Radio Frankfurt and conducted the Nordwestdeutscher Rundfunk orchestra. His last recordings were in a Dixieland style in 1951.
