= Karel Vlach =

Czech conductor (1911–1986)

Karel Vlach (8 October 1911 in Prague – 26 February 1986 in Prague) was a Czech dance orchestra conductor and arranger.

He founded his first orchestra in 1938. Many important composers, instrumentalists and arrangers of the Czech jazz scene gradually went through his band.

In 1947-48 Vlach's orchestra cooperated with the V+W Theatre (former Osvobozené divadlo). He recorded prolifically with Supraphon and his output includes both light classical and orchestral as well as jazz and pop arrangements for big band with strings.

He also arranged and conducted many Czech film scores from 1940 to 1980. He launched the singing careers of Czech artists Yvetta Simonová (whom he married) and Milan Chladil in 1958. He and his musical colleagues Dalibor Brázda and Gustav Brom also arranged and recorded many titles for British singer Gery Scott in the late 1950s, mostly from what is now termed the American Songbook series. Many of these titles are now collector's items.
