= Luděk Hulan =

Czech musician and songwriter

- Czech double-bassist Luděk Hulan

Background information
- Birth name: Luděk Hulan
- Born: October 11, 1929
- Origin: Prague, Czechoslovakia
- Died: February 22, 1979 (aged 49); Prague, Czechoslovakia
- Genres: Jazz
- Occupation: Double-bassist
- Instrument: Double-bass

Luděk Hulan (11 October 1929, in Prague – 22 February 1979, in Prague) was a Czech jazz double-bassist and musical organiser. He was an important exponent of Czech jazz in the second half of the 20th century.

== Biography ==
Hulan started his career as a founder-member of the amateur Hootie Club ensemble in 1948. In the early 1950s he performed in various professional jazz ensembles and helped organise jam sessions in Prague. From 1953 to 1957, he moved to Brno and played double bass with the Gustav Brom Orchestra, and on his return to Prague he co-founded Studio 5, which later became a part of the Taneční orchestr Československého rozhlasu (TOČR) (The Dance Orchestra of the Czechoslovak Radio). Studio 5, one of the most important modern jazz ensembles in Czechoslovakia, disbanded in 1961, and Hulan founded another band - Jazzové studio (The Jazz Studio). The Jazz Studio often performed Hulan's own short compositions, which had poetic titles connected with the "flow of modern life". In the late 1960s he still collaborated with TOČR (later renamed the Jazz Orchestra of the Czechoslovak Radio - JOČR) and actively participated in Czech musical life. He was one of the pioneers of the "Jazz a poezie" (Jazz and Poetry) movement, which focused on cross-connections between various spheres of the Arts. In his Jazz studio Hulan collaborated with many important jazz instrumentalists, among them tenor saxophonist Milan Ulrich and trumpeter Richard Kubernát.

In 1968, following the Soviet invasion of Czechoslovakia he emigrated to Switzerland, but could find no work connected with music and soon returned. His wife and daughter remained abroad. As a returned emigrant he was listed as "politically undesirable", a considerable obstacle in finding new music engagements. Despite this, he organised night-time jam sessions in the "poetic wine bar" Viola, founded a new band, Jazz Sanatorium with former colleagues from Jazz Studio, and helped its younger members in their careers. He also found work - occasional at first - with the Linha Singers ensemble. In 1972 the Traditional Jazz Studio invited him to record with the New Orleans clarinetist Albert Nicholas. He also performed with the American clarinetist Tony Scott, and prepared a TV series, Jazzový herbář (The Jazz Herbarium) with the director M. Peer. Hulan organised the "Jazz-film-forum" and "Jazz quiz" as part of his Jazz Sanatorium, using American films, recordings and literature. This was a rare event: in the "deep normalisation" of Czechoslovakia, any propagation of American culture was officially undesirable. However, the Communist authorities had already confiscated his passport, so Hulan could visit the American embassy in Prague and borrow the materials for these readings and shows "without fear".

Luděk Hulan died under unhappy circumstances. He broke a rib in a stairway fall. The rib had pierced a lung, but Hulan was unaware of the nature or extent of his injury. He went to bed as usual, and died there.

The Czech Jazz Society presents an annual Luděk Hulan Award at the Slaný Jazz Days. In 1984, the prize was awarded to Eva Olmerová, Hulan's regular collaborator.

== Works ==
- Černý proud (The Black Stream)
- Duše jazzového hudebníka (The Soul of the Jazz Musician)
- Moderní žena (A Modern Woman)
- Valčík pro Charlieho Chaplina (Valse for Charlie Chaplin)

== Discography ==
- Jazz In My Soul (Supraphon 1965) [LP]
- Jazz kolem Karla Krautgartnera (Supraphon 1965) [LP]
- Poezie a jazz I. (Poetry and Jazz I) (1965) [LP]
- Poezie a jazz II. (Poetry and Jazz II) (1967) [LP]
- Albert's Blues - together with Traditional Jazz Studio and Albert Nicholas, (Supraphon 1 15 1420) (1972) [LP]
- Jazz Sanatorium (Mini jazz klub) (P 33 0480) (1976) [EP]
- Milá společnost (S 1 15 2309) (1977) [LP]
- Bumerang - together with Traditional Jazz Studio and Tony Scott, (1978) [LP]
- Luděk Hulan: Blues for You (Mlt MCD 005) (1994) [CD]
