= Lutz Templin =

Ludwig "Lutz" Templin (June 18, 1901 - March 7, 1973) was a German jazz bandleader.

Born in Düsseldorf, Templin played violin and saxophone, and studied composition, before finding work playing and arranging in dance ensembles. From 1941 to 1949, he led a big band in Germany, which recorded extensively and was broadcast on German radio. This ensemble also recorded as Charlie and his Orchestra, performing arrangements of American jazz hits with propagandistic lyrics inserted; these were broadcast on Nazi radio stations.

Templin's ensemble operated out of Berlin until 1943, when Allied bombing resulted in their relocation to Stuttgart. Templin remained in Stuttgart after the war, and continued performing there for most of the rest of his life. He died in Stuttgart, West Germany in 1973, aged 71.
