= Mark Janicello =

American entertainer (born 1962)

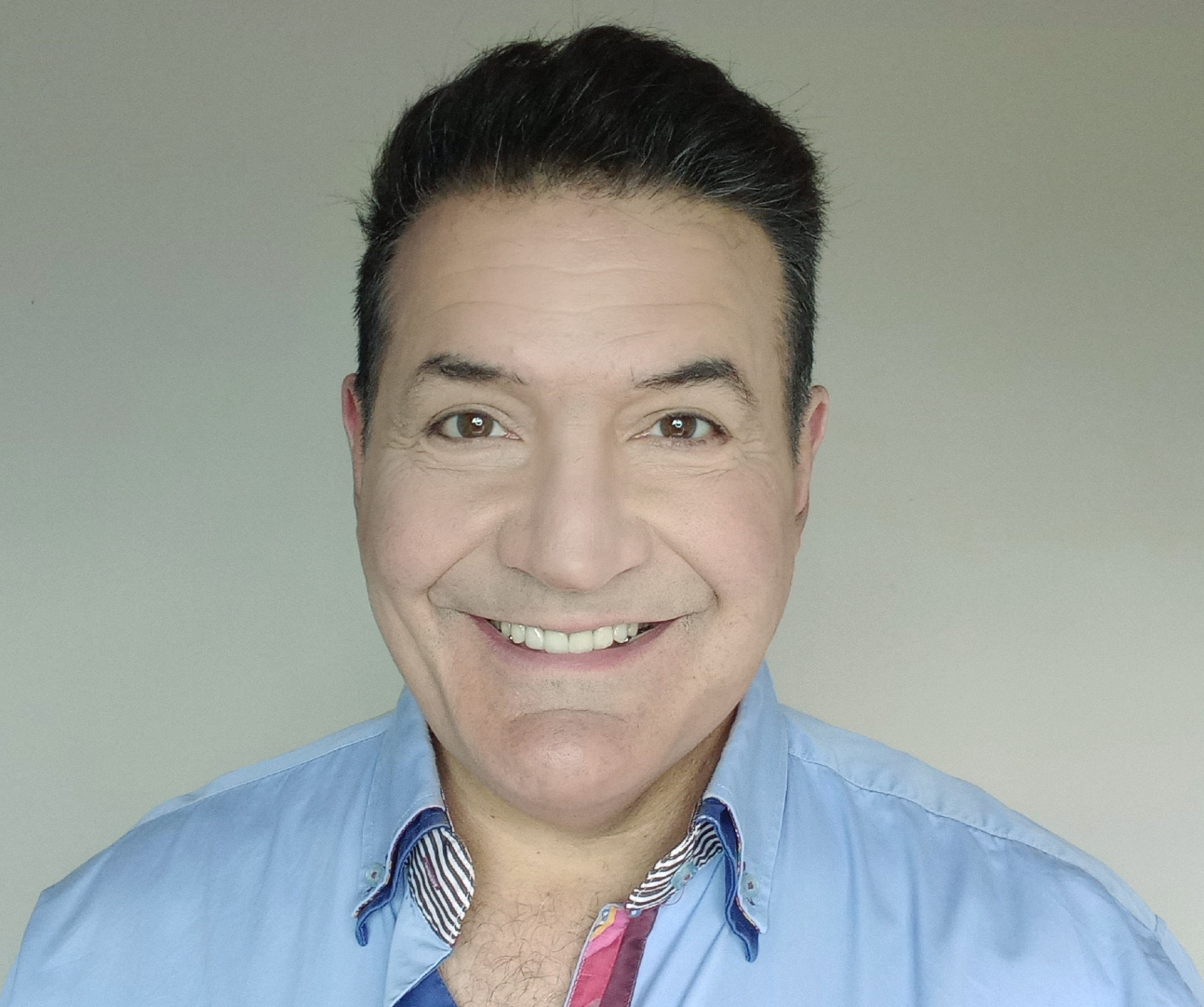
- Janicello in October 2023
- Born: November 3, 1962 (age 63); Brooklyn, New York
- Education: University of North Carolina at Greensboro
- Years active: 1984–present
- Notable work: The Finellis Movie
- Spouse: Danielle Bayer (married 1989–2000)
- Children: 2

YouTube information
- Channel: MarkJanicello
- Years active: 2006–present
- Genre: Entertainment
- Subscribers: 22 thousand
- Views: 12 million
- Last updated: January 26, 2026
- Website: markjanicello.com; markjanicello.org; thefinellis.com

Mark Janicello (born November 3, 1962) is an American singer, actor, writer, producer and author. He is known for playing Elvis Presley in two musicals that toured Europe, after gaining attention by winning a musical competition sponsored by Kentucky Fried Chicken. He also created, wrote, and acted in The Finellis Movie which he then adapted into a musical.

== Early life ==
Mark Janicello was born on November 3, 1962, in Brooklyn, New York. He attended the University of North Carolina at Greensboro, earning a Bachelor's degree in 1984.

== Career ==
Janicello began his career by singing in the subways of New York City in the mid-1980s as part of the MTA's Music Under New York program. In 1988, Janicello made his west coast debut playing Raoul de Gardefeu in the Opera at the Academy's co-production (with Long Beach Opera) of La Vie parisienne directed by Christopher Alden. In the late 1980s, Janicello began performing with the charitable foundation Music for All Seasons, singing in children's hospitals, prisons and old age homes.

In 1990, conductor Eve Queler heard Janicello and subsequently engaged him to perform in Donizetti's Roberto Devereux, with which he made his Carnegie Hall debut. Janicello also performed for two seasons with the comedic opera troupe La Gran Scena Opera. In 1996 Janicello sang the world-premiere of the opera Nuit des Hommes by Per Nørgård.

Janicello's first performance in an operetta was as Camille, Count de Rossillon in the Paper Mill Playhouse production of Lehár's Die lustige Witwe. He returned to Die lustige Witwe two more times in 2010 in Vienna, this time playing Count Danilo Danilovitsch with the Wiener Operettensommer. Other operetta roles have included among others, Orpheus in Orpheus in der Unterwelt and Alfred in Die Fledermaus. In October 2012, he co-starred in the musical Loving the Silent Tears, directed by Vincent Paterson. He also appears on the musical's cast album. The Musical is based on the poetry of Supreme Master Ching Hai. In 2021, Janicello provided the German narration for the documentary film Eating Our Way to Extinction, replacing Kate Winslet's English narration for German-speaking Europe.

=== The Elvis Presley decade ===
In 1992, Janicello was approached by the Music Under New York program to enter the KFC Musical Feast competition representing New York City. The competition was a nationwide search sponsored by Kentucky Fried Chicken. Janicello created a performance where he first sang "Recondita armonia" from Tosca, dressed as a rock singer, and then aided by a quick costume change would switch back and forth between the songs "It's Now or Never" and "O Sole Mio" (which share the same melody) while switching vocal and performance styles between "Elvis and Luciano Pavarotti". He won the competition and was awarded the $15,000.00 first prize by head judge Bo Diddley. Janicello appeared with Bo Diddley on NBC's Today show. Janicello was invited to join the International Opera Studio (IOS) of the Zurich Opera in 1994. Peter Reichenbach, Artistic Director of Cinemusic Festival in Gstaad, Switzerland asked him to perform as Elvis Presley with composer Ben Weisman at the first annual Cinemusic Festival in 1995. After performing with him in Gstaad, Weisman gave Janicello the unreleased Elvis song "Will You Still Be There." Janicello, together with Weisman recorded, released, and promoted the song in 1996 and 1997.

On the back of the release of "Will You Still Be There", Stadttheater Klagenfurt hired Janicello to play Elvis Presley in their 1997 production, Elvis: A Musical Biography. The musical moved from Klagenfurt to Wiener Metropol. In 2002, Janicello wrote a new musical about Presley's life, Elvis: Die Show, sein Leben which combined newly-composed songs with songs from Elvis' catalogue of hits which celebrated its world premiere at Theater Akzent in Vienna and an extended run of performances at the Deutsches Theater in Munich. The musical featured both "Will You Still Be There" and "Great Big Mama."

=== The Finellis Movie and musical ===
In 2016, Janicello began work as author, executive producer, co-director, lyricist and leading actor on the award-winning comedy The Finellis. Originally planned to be a television series, a proof-of-concept episode of The Finellis was a featured presentation at the 2016 Berlin Serienale. In January 2019, The Finellis went into production in Berlin with some new cast members, rewritten scripts. The Finellis Movie, was released internationally on January 18, 2022. In late 2022, Janicello and composer Ulf Weidmann began turning The Finellis Movie into a stage musical which had its world-premiere production at Wonderville in London from June 3 through June 16, 2024.

=== Writings ===
Janicello's first work as Musical Author was The Chamelon Concert which celebrated its world premiere in September 1998 in Vienna's Theater AKzent. In 1999, Janicello wrote the script for Be My Love: The Mario Lanza Musical which celebrated its world premiere in Theater AKzent on October 7, 1999 the 40th anniversary of Lanza's death. Be My Love was a jukebox musical whose score contained popular Italian Folk Songs, well-known operatic arias and a number of Lanza's hit songs. In 2001, Janicello authored the book and worked as co-lyricist with Rolf Rettburg on his first completely original musical, Charlie: A New Musical. Charlie's music was composed by Béla Fischer. Charlie had its world premiere in a German-language version in Vienna's Cabaret Stadnikow in March 2001. In 2004, an English-language version of Charlie was produced in Amsterdam, with additional songs by Kai Peterson.

In 2012, Janicello was engaged to write 6 articles about the marketing of art and artists for Hoop Doop Magazine. Since 2018, Janicello has worked as critic-at-large for BroadwayWorld.com reviewing stage productions in Berlin, northern Germany and London.

In Spring 2022, Janicello was commissioned to write a new play Take the Bins Out, a 75-minute monologue for a visually-impaired actor. The play tells the story of Finley Whitmore, whose diagnosis of Retinitis pigmentosa, a congenital eye disorder, is wreaking havoc on his professional and personal life. Take the Bins Out celebrated its world premiere on August 4, 2023 at the Edinburgh Fringe Festival. The Edinburgh production stars Milo Mooney, a visually-impaired actor/comedian as Finley and was directed by Janicello. The Finellis Musical with music by Ulf Weidmann and book and lyrics by Janicello premiered at Wonderville in London in June 2024.

In 2026, Janicello became a contributing columnist for Creative Business News.

== Personal life ==
Janicello has been vegan since 2004 and advocates publicly for a plant-based lifestyle. He joined Scientology in 1994 before leaving in 2003. He published a book about his experiences in Scientology, Naked in the Spotlight: My Life with Sex, Singing and Scientology which was published in German in 2011 and in English in 2016

== Acting credits ==
=== Film ===
Year	Title	Role	Notes
1987	84 Charing Cross Road	Best Man	
1987	Deadly Illusion	Partygoer	
1988	Shakedown	Drug Addict	
1988	Married to the Mob	Bartender	
1988	Spike of Bensonhurst	Tony	
1989	Rooftops	Drug Dealer	
1989	Mozzarella	Mario	Short film
1989	Fear, Anxiety & Depression	Copyshop Employee	
1990	Blue Steel	Police Cadett	
1991	The Hard Way	Partygoer	
2011	The Conversation	Cowboy	Short film
2012	All My Love	Bob	Short film
2013	Sternstunde ihres Lebens	General Miller	TV film
2014	Ein Tag wie jeder andere	Herr Weissner	Short film
2015	Der Primus	Lt. Ernst Hauser	TV film
2016	Die 69 Götter des Höllenfeuers	Vincent Woodruf	Short film
2021	Eating Our Way to Extinction	Narrator	Documentary
2022	The Finellis Movie	Tony Finelli	
2022	Binny and Baba	Drama School President	
2024	Trauma	Geoffrey Moore	Feature
2025	3 Days	Godfather	Short film
2025	Speech	Lounge Singer	Short film
2025	The Age of Love	Detective Picchione	Feature
2026	Morphé	German Officer	Short Film
2026	Sugo	Salvatore Andrea	Short film
2026	Christmas in Wales	Sam	TV Film

=== Television ===
Year	Title	Role	Notes
1987	Showtime at the Apollo	Guest Star	1 episode
1998-1999	Hello Vienna, Hello Austria	Host	24 episodes
2012	Der Mediator	Frank Delay	Pilot episode
2012	Freddy	Ralph	TV miniseries (1 episode)
2013	Frühstücksfernsehen	Agent W. Smith	1 episode
2013	Verstehen sie Spaß?	Johann	1 episode
2013	Volle Kanne	Guest Star	1 episode
2013	Auf Streife	Gernot Peters	1 episode
2013	Verstehen sie Spaß?	British Businessman	1 episode
2014	Schneller als die Polizei erlaubt	Ludger Trinkhaus	1 episode
2014	Achtung, Kontrolle	Giovanni Bellini	1 episode
2014	Stand by Me	Guest Start	Pilot episode
2014	Verstehen sie Spaß?	Martin Dams	1 episode
2015	Libido Love	Marc Caccamo	Pilot episode
2015	Die Celiks	Chaniqua LeStrange	1 episode
2015	The Immigrant Experience	The American	1 episode
2015	Mein dunkles Geheimnis	Detlef Brahms	1 episode
2015	Hilf Mir!	Dr. Guido Rehbein	1 episode
2015	In Gefahr	Fabrizio Montani	1 episode
2015	Die Celiks	Singing Teacher	1 episode
2015	Hirschausens Quiz des Menschens	Marc Thalhäuser	1 episode
2015	Betrugsfälle	Sascha Pantic	1 episode
2015	Hilf Mir!	Gerry Walker	1 episode
2015	Schneller als die Polizei erlaubt	Manuel Weiler	1 episode
2015	Das Aschenputtel Experiment	Guest Star	1 episode
2016	The Finellis Sitcom	Tony Finelli	Pilot episode
2016	Hilf Mir!	Bruce Heinberg	1 episode
2016	Akte 20.16	Wilfried W.	1 episode
2018	Berlin Tag & Nacht	Robert Hardy	6 episodes
2018	Gin & It	Adrian the Master	Pilot episode
2018	Die Wahrheit über...	Michael	Documentary
2018	Late Night Berlin	Calaf	1 episode
2022	The Diplomat	National Security Chief	1 episode

=== Theatre ===
Year	Title	Character	Director	Company
1982	The Boy Friend	Tony		Paramount Theatre
1983	Grease	Teen Angel	William Wendt	Aycock Auditorium
1983	Hatfields and McCoys	Spirit Hatfield	John Arnold	Theater West Virginia
1983	Honey in the Rock	Rex Covington	John Arnold	Theater West Virginia
1983	Cabaret	Aryan Soldat	William Wendt	The Studio at UNC-G
1983	Comic Books Tonight	Superman	Juan Fernandez	Alfredo's
1984	Camelot	Sir Sagramore	Terrence Mann	Raleigh Memorial Auditorium
1984	Hatfields and McCoys	Spirit Hatfield	John Arnold	Theater West Virginia
1984	West Side Story	Tony	William Wendt	Aycock Auditorium
1985	Star-Crossed Lovers	Romeo	Richard Haase	Dramatist's Guild
1985	Sweet Adeline	Ensemble	Peter Howard	The Town Hall
1985	Fiddler on the Roof	Motel Kamzoil	John Arnold	Theater West Virginia
1986	Angelina (reading)	Narrator	Barry Kleinbort	Dramatist's Guild
1987	The Three Sisters	Fedotik		Ensemble Studio Theatre
1987	As You Like It	Amiens	Scott Noflet	Judith Anderson Theatre
1992	Kismet	Caliph	Don Westwood	Opera Northeast Tour
1992	Jesus Christ Superstar	Annas	Robert Johansen	Papermill Playhouse
1992	Lend Me a Tenor	Tito Mirelli	John Going	Olney Theater
1996	Winterzirkus	Canio	Joachim Lang	Platzl's Theaterie
1997	Elvis: A Musical Biography	Elvis Presley	Anna Vaughn	Stadttheater Klagenfurt
1998	Elivs: A Musical Biography	Elvis Presley	Anna Vaughn	Metropol Vienna
1998	The Chamaleon Concert	Self	Self	Theater Akzent
1998	City of Angels	Jimmy Powers	Heinz Ehrenfreund	Musicalsommer Amstetten
1999	Be My Love: Das Mario Lanza Musical	Mario Lanza	Self	Theater AKzent
2001	Victor/Victoria	King Marchand	Pavel Fieber	Landestheater Salzburg
2001	Charlie: A New Musical	Charlie	Self	Kabarett Stadnikow
2003	Elvis: The Musical	Elvis Presley	Self	Deutsches Theater Munich
2005	Charlie: A New Musical	Charlie	Self	Het Werkteater
2012	Loving the Silent Tears	The Italian Tenor	Vincent Paterson	Shrine Auditiorium
2023	The Finellis Musical (Producer's Presentation)	Tony Finelli	Self	Phoenix Arts Club
2023	Take the Bins Out	Writer/Director	Self	Edinburgh Fringe Festival
2024	The Finellis Musical	Tony Finelli	Self	Wonderville London

=== Opera and operetta ===
Year	Title	Character	Director or conductor	Company
1980	Pagliacci	Ensemble	Arvid Knudsen	Aycock Auditorium
1983	Così fan tutte	Ferrando	Arvid Knudsen	Aycock Auditorium
1985	La fille du régiment	Ensemble		New York City Opera
1985	Attilla	Ensemble	Frank Cosaro	New York City Opera
1985	Turandot	Ensemble	Lotfi Mansouri	New York City Opera
1986	The Student Prince	The Prince	Prescott Griffith	Carousel Dinner Theatre
1986	Little Red Riding Hood	The Woodcutter	John Turner	Dramatists' Guild
1986	La Giaconda	Ensemble	Alfredo Silipigni	New Jersey Opera
1986	Introduction to Opera	The Tenor	various	Metropolitan Opera Guild
1987	Otello	Cassio		Regina Opera
1988	Madama Butterfly	Pinkerton	Don Westwood	Opera Northeast Tour
1988	Lucia di Lammermoor	Arturo		Long Island Opera
1988	La Vie parisienne	Raoul de Gardefeu	Christopher Alden	Opera at the Academy
1989	Babes in Toyland	Alan	Dino Anagnost	World Financial Center
1990	Die Fledermaus	Alfredo	Ron Peluso	Schubert Theater
1990	La gazza ladra	Ensemble	Timothy Lindberg	The Town Hall
1991	The Merry Widow	Camillie	Jim Coleman	Paper Mill Playhouse
1991	Roberto Devereux	Roberto	Eve Queler	Carnegie Hall
1992	Elisabetta, regina d'Inghilterra	Leicester	Don Westwood	Opera Northeast Tour
1992	Tosca	Cavardossi	Ted Taylor	Augusta Opera
1992	Tosca	Cavadossi	Peter Mark	Virginia Opera
1992	La traviata	Alfredo	Robert Butts	Opera at Florham
1992	La Gran Scena Opera	Mario Costaplenti	Ira Siff	European Tour
1993	La Gran Scena Opera	Mario Costaplenti	Ira Siff	The Town Hall
1994	Linda di Chamounix	Intendente	Ádám Fischer	Zurich Opera
1994	Die Frau ohne Schatten	Der Jungling	Christoph von Dohnányi	Zurich Opera
1995	Dido and Aeneas	First Sailor	David Zinman	Tonhalle, Zurich
1995	Trouble in Tahiti	Jazz Trio	Reto Nickler	Tonhalle, Zurich
1995	Roméo et Juliette	Benvolio	Serge Baudo	Zurich Opera
1995	Der Kaiser von Atlantis	Harlekin/Soldat	Marc Belfort	Zurich Opera
1995	Hin und zurück	Robert	Marc Belfort	Zurich Opera
1995	Le pauvre matelot	le Matelot	Marc Belfort	Zurich Opera
1995	Crossing Brooklyn Ferry	The Traveler	Graham Todd	Arundel Cathedral
1995	Die göttliche Kirmes	Doufi	Reto Nickler	St. Gallen Opera
1995	Die göttliche Kirmes	Doufi	Reto Nickler	Aarhus Opera
1996	The Man Who Mistook His Wife for a Hat	Dr. S.	Wolfgang Gratschmaier	Amadeus Festival Vienna
1996	Der Mann, der seine Frau mit einem Hut verwechselte	Dr. S.	Bertram Dippel	Opera Erlangen
1996	Nuit des Hommes	Wilhelm	Jakkob Schokking	World Music Festival
1999	Die Fledermaus	Alfredo	Heinz Ehrenfreund	Landestheater Salzburg
2000	Orpheus in der Unterwelt	Orpheus	Sylvia Dönsch	Badener Operetten Theater Japan Tour
2005	Die lustige Witwe	Danilo	Annette Wolf	Stichting Int'l Opera Producties BeNeLux Tour
2006	Die Csárdásfürstin	Edwin	Annette Wolf	Stichting Int'l Opera Producties BeNeLux Tour
2007	Orpheus in der Unterwelt	Orpheus	Benjamin Sahler	Opernfestspiel Nürtingen
2007	La traviata	Alfredo	Niels Muus	Musikfestival Steyr
2008	Der Zarewitsch	Zarewitch	Wolfgang Dosch	Bergtheater Thale
2008	Die verkaufte Braut	Edwin	Kay Metzger	Bergtheater Thale
2010	Die lustige Witwe	Danilo	Patricia Nessy	Wiener Operettensommer
2011	Giovanna d'Arco	Carlo VII	Marc Pantus	Rotterdam Opera
2014	Hänsel und Gretel	Die Knusperhexe	Inga Hilsberg	Kammeroper Köln

=== Music videos ===
Year	Title	Artist	Role
2002	Great Big Mama	Mark Janicello	Self
2010	Great Big Mama XXL	Mark Janicello	Self
2011	Push It Now	Mark Janicello	Self
2014	I Am a Man	Mark Janicello	Self
2021	19th Floor	Joy Crookes	Music Executive
2021	Late Night	Luciano	Police Officer
2022	White Wine	French the Kid	Oliver Jennings
2025	We Gotta Dance	Mark Janicello	Self
2026	My B.F.F. Jack Daniels	Mark Janicello	Self

=== Web projects ===
Year	Title	Role	Notes
2002	Fate by Numbers	General Walters	Computer game
2015	Trips	Bill Wendt	Webseries (3 episodes)
2021	Bronte	Detective Lloyd	Podcast
2022	Resurgence	Sheriff Hal Hardy	A.I. game
2022	Dog Sports Day	Host	Woof Woof TV

== Awards and nominations ==
In the 2019–2020 Awards Season, The Finellis in its sitcom iteration and Janicello's work on the project were nominated for, and won numerous prizes at international film and TV festivals.

Year	Association	Category	Performance	Result	Ref.
2021	London International Filmmaker Festival	Best TV/Web Series	The Finellis	Won	
2021	London International Filmmaker Festival	Best Director of a Short Film	Joris Hermans	Nominated	
2021	London International Filmmaker Festival	Best Actor in a Short Film	Mark Janicello	Nominated	
2021	London International Filmmaker Festival	Best Supporting Actor in a Short Film	George Pollock	Nominated	
2021	London International Filmmaker Festival	Best Editing of a Short Film	Joris Hermans & Mark Janicello	Nominated	
2021	Oz Indie Film Festival	Best TV Series Pilot	The Finellis	Won	
2020	Berlin International TV Festival	Best Comedy Series	The Finellis	Nominated	
2021	Prague Int'l Monthly Film Festival	Best Web/Television Series	The Finellis	Won	
2021	Prague Int'l Monthly Film Festival	Best Trailer	The Finellis	Nominated	
2020	Amsterdam World International Film Festival	Best Television Series	The Finellis	Won	
2020	Los Angeles Film Awards	Best Web/TV Series Pilot	The Finellis	Won	
2020	Los Angeles Film Awards	Best Comedy	The Finellis	Won	
2020	Portland Comedy Film Festival	Best Comedy TV Episode or Sitcom	The Finellis	Nominated	
2020	Cult Critic Movie Awards	Best Television/Pilot Program or Series	The Finellis	Won	
2020	Cult Critic Movie Awards	Jean-Luc Godard Award	The Finellis	Nominated	
2020	Vegas Movie Awards	Best Television Series Pilot	The Finellis	Won	
2020	Vegas Movie Awards	Best Song	"Here I Am Again" (M: Ulf Weidmann, L: Mark Janicello)	Won	
2020	Vegas Movie Awards	Best Director	Joris Hermans	Nominated	
2020	Vegas Movie Awards	Best Actor	Mark Janicello	Nominated	
2020	London International Motion Pictures Awards	Best Pilot Series	The Finellis	Nominated	
2020	London Independent Film Awards	Best Web/TV Series Pilot	The Finellis	Won	
2020	Rome Film Awards	Best Television Series	The Finellis	Won	
2020	Rome Film Awards	Best Song	"Here I Am Again" (M: Ulf Weidmann, L: Mark Janiello)	Nominated	
2020	The Int'l TV Broadcasters & Independent Producers Festival	Best Entertainment Series	The Finellis	Nominated	
2020	Euro Cinema Film Festival Geneva	Best Television Series	The Finellis	Nominated	
2020	Euro Cinema Film Festival Geneva	Best Song	The Finellis	Nominated	
2020	German United Film Festival	Best Television Series	"The Finellis"	Won	
2020	After Hour Film Festival	Best Television Series	"The Finellis"	Won	
2020	Assurdo Film Festival	Best Screenplay	The Finellis	Nominated	
2020	Assurdo Film Festival	Best Editing	The Finellis	Nominated	
2020	Assurdo Film Festival	Best Trailer	The Finellis	Nominated	
2020	Assurdo Film Festival	Best Poster	The Finellis	Nominated	
2020	Vesuvius Int'l Monthly Film Festival	Best Web/TV Series Pilot	The Finellis	Won	
2020	Vesuvius Int'l Monthly Film Festival	Best Actor	Mark Janicello	Nominated	
2020	Vesuvius Int'l Monthly Film Festival	Best Actress	Bianca Carsten	Nominated	
2020	Vesuvius Int'l Monthly Film Festival	Best Director	Joris Hermans	Nominated	
2020	Vesuvius Int'l Monthly Film Festival	Best Music	Ulf Weidmann	Nominated	
2020	VIP Film Festival	Best Web/TV Series	The Finellis	Nominated	
2020	DUMBO Film Festival	Best Short Form Narrative Film	The Finellis	Nominated	
2021	Gold Movie Awards London	Best Television Series	The Finellis	Nominated	
2021	Gold Movie Awards London	Best Animation	The Finellis	Nominated	
2021	Gold Movie Awards London	Best Director	Joris Hermans	Nominated	
2021	Gold Movie Awards London	Best Actor	Mark Janicello	Nominated	
2021	Gold Movie Awards London	Best Actress	Bianca Karsten	Nominated	
2021	Gold Movie Awards London	Best Screenplay	Mark Janicello	Nominated	
2020	Santa Monica Film Festival	Best Episodic Content		Mention	
2020	Peak City International Film Festival	Best Foreign (Non-U.S.) Television Series Pilot	The Finellis	Won	
2020	South Coast Film Festival	Best Comedy SitCom	The Finellis	Won	
2020	South Coast Film Festival	Best Comedy SitCom Script	The Finellis	Won	
2019	Mediterranean Film Festival in Cannes	Best Television Series	The Finellis	Mention	
2019	New York City TV Festival	Best Television Series	The Finellis	Won	
2019	New York City TV Festival	Best Director	The Finellis	Won	
2019	New York City TV Festival	Best Actor	Mark Janicello	Nominated	
2019	New York City TV Festival	Best Actress	Bianca Karsten	Nominated	
2016	Berlin Serienale	Out of competition Screening	Proof of Concept Episode	Screening	

- 1988 – Janicello was awarded a $4,000 scholarship by The Licia Albanese-Puccini Foundation. In addition to the cash prize, he was awarded singing lessons with operatic tenor Franco Corelli.
- 1992 – Janicello won the $15,000 Grand Prize in the KFC Musical Feast Competition and was named "The Best Street Performer" in America.
- 2016 – Janicello was awarded the Fips Fleischer Music Prize by the City of Leipzig, Germany for his many years of performances in that city He was awarded the prize by the Mayor of Leipzig Heiko Rosenthal.
- 2022 – Janicello was awarded the Honorary Title, "Best Gospel Elvis" at the Porthcawl Elvis Festival in Porthcawl, Wales, which is said to be the "largest Elvis Festival in the world".

== Bibliography ==
Janicello's autobiography Naked in the Spotlight: My Life with Sex, Singing and Scientology was published in a German translation (Nackt im Rampenlicht) in April 2011 by Ibera Publishers of Vienna. The English version of Naked in the Spotlight was published in 2016.
