= Siddhartha =

Siddhārtha is a common Indian male given name. It is also the given name of the founder of Buddhism, Gautama Buddha.

Siddhartha, Siddartha, or Siddharth may also refer to:

== Books ==
- Siddhartha (novel), about a fictional contemporary of the Buddha, by Hermann Hesse
- Siddhartha (play), a fictional account of Gautama Buddha's enlightenment, by Victor Segalen

== Film and TV ==
- Siddhartha (1972 film), a 1972 American film
- Sidhartha (1998 film), a 1998 Indian Malayalam film
- Siddharth: The Prisoner, a 2008 Indian Hindi film
- Siddharth (2013 film), a 2013 Indian-Canadian film
- Siddhartha (2015 film), a 2015 Indian Kannada film

== Music ==
- Siddharta (band), a Slovenian rock band
- Siddhartha (band), an American rock band
- Siddhartha (opera), opera by Per Nørgård
- Siddhartha (1976), orchestral suite by Claude Vivier (1948–1983)
- Siddhartha (musical), a 2007 original production by Chu Un Temple and BLIA Cebu
- "Siddhartha", a song by Jerry Cantrell on the album Degradation Trip Volumes 1 & 2
- "Siddhartha", a song by Art Farmer from Crawl Space

== People ==
=== Given name ===
==== Siddhartha ====
- Siddhartha of Kundagrama, father of Mahavira (24th Jain Tirthankara)
- Siddhartha (musician), Mexican musician
- Siddhartha Basu, Indian quiz show host
- Siddhartha Bhattacharya (born 1961), Indian politician
- Siddhartha Chatterjee, Indian actor
- Siddhartha Chib, econometrician and statistician, professor
- Siddhartha Chowdhury (born 1974), Indian novelist
- Siddhartha Deb (born 1970), Indian author
- Siddhartha Gigoo (born 1974), Indian author and filmmaker
- Siddhartha Lal (born 1973), Indian businessman
- Siddhartha Mukherjee (born 1970), Indian physician and author, winner of the 2011 Pulitzer Prize for General Nonfiction
- Siddhartha Nuni (born 1983), Indian cinematographer
- Siddhartha Sarma, Indian novelist
- Siddhartha Shankar Ray (1920–2010), Indian lawyer and politician
- Siddhartha Roy (born 1954), Indian structural biologist and biophysicist
- Siddhartha Paul Tiwari (born 1979), Indian academic, technologist and researcher

==== Siddharth ====
- Siddharth (actor) (born 1979), Indian actor
- Siddharth Anand (born 1978), Indian film director
- Siddharth Arora, Indian television actor
- Siddharth Balachandran (born 1976), Indian entrepreneur
- Siddharth Basrur (born 1981), Indian vocalist, composer, and playback singer
- Siddharth Chandekar (born 1991), Indian actor in Marathi cinema
- Siddharth Chandrakar (born 1993), Indian cricketer
- Siddharth Chatterjee, Indian United Nations coordinator
- Siddharth Chauhan, Indian screenwriter, director and producer
- Siddharth Chitnis (born 1987), Indian cricketer
- Siddharth Desai (born 2000), Indian cricketer
- Siddharth Garg, Indian cybersecurity researcher and associate professor
- Siddharth Gupta (born 1993), Indian actor
- Siddharth Haldipur, Indian singer and music director, part of the duo Sangeet-Siddharth
- Siddharth Jadhav (born 1981), Indian actor and comedian
- Siddharth Jagadeesh (born 2007), Singaporean chess grandmaster
- Siddharth Kak, Indian documentary maker, television producer and presenter
- Siddharth Kannan, Indian television and radio host
- Siddharth Kara, Indian author
- Siddharth Kharat, Indian politician
- Siddharth Koirala, Nepalese film actor
- Siddharth Lama (born 1985), Nepalese film actor
- Siddharth Mahadevan (born 1993), Indian playback singer and composer
- Siddharth Makkar, Indian actor
- Siddharth Menon (actor) (born 1989), Indian actor
- Siddharth Menon (singer) (born 1989), Indian playback singer
- Siddharth Mohan (born 1984), Indian singer
- Siddharth Mridul (born 1962), Indian judge
- Siddharth Nagarajan (born 1997), Indian drummer
- Siddharth Nigam (born 2000), Indian actor
- Siddharth P. Malhotra, Indian writer
- Siddharth Pandey (born 1987), Indian writer, literary scholar, and cultural historian
- Siddharth Patel, Indian politician
- Siddharth Randeria (born 1955), Indian actor
- Siddharth Ray (1963–2004), Indian film actor
- Siddharth Roy Kapur (born 1974), Indian film producer
- Siddharth Sagar (born 1993), Indian comedian and television actor
- Siddharth Sahib Singh (born 1980), Indian cricketer
- Siddharth Sanghvi (born 1977), Indian author
- Siddharth Saraf (born 1992), Indian cricketer
- Siddharth Saurav (born 1981), Indian politician
- Siddharth Shaw (born 1999), Indian actor
- Siddharth Shirole (born 1979), Indian politician
- Siddharth Singh (born 1993), Indian footballer
- Siddharth Sinha (born 1978), Indian film maker
- Siddharth Sirish Desai (born 5 1991), Indian kabaddi player
- Siddharth Sivakumar (born 1991), Indian curator, art critic, and writer
- Siddharth Suchde (born 1985), Indian squash player
- Siddharth Kumar Tewary (born 1978), Indian television producer and director
- Siddharth Tiwari, Indian politician
- Siddharth Trivedi (born 1982), Indian cricketer
- Siddharth Varadarajan (born 1965), Indian journalist
- Siddharth Venugopal (born 1985), Indian actor
- Siddharth Vipin (born 1985), Indian composer
- Siddharth Yadav, known as Elvish Yadav (born 1997), Indian YouTuber and streamer

==== Sidharth ====
- Sidharth (artist) (born 1956), Indian painter and sculptor
- Sidharth Bharathan (born 1983), Indian actor in Malayalam cinema
- Sidharth Bhardwaj (born 1987), Indian model and actor
- Sidharth Burman (1944/45–2015), Indian billionaire
- Sidharth Kuncalienker, Indian politician
- Sidharth Luthra (born 1966), Indian jurist
- Sidharth Malhotra (born 1985), Indian film actor
- Sidharth Sarmah (born 1998), Indian cricketer
- Sidharth Sharma (1994–2023), Indian cricketer
- Sidharth Sengupta, Indian television director and producer
- Sidharth Shukla (born 1980–2021), Indian film actor
- Sidharth Nath Singh (born 1963), Indian politician
- Sidharth Sriram (born 1990), Indian musician

==== Other spellings ====
- Siddartha Jatla, also known as Jatla Siddartha, Indian filmmaker
- Sidhartha Mallya (born 1987), American actor and model
- Sidhartha Siva (born 1985), Malayalam film actor, director and scenarist
- Sidharto Suryodipuro, Indonesian Ambassador to India since 2017

=== Surname ===
- Ashok Siddharth, Indian politician
- Bukkapatnam Siddharth (born 1990), Indian-born Omani cricketer
- Chandra Siddhartha (born 1696), Indian film director, screenwriter and producer
- Gita Siddharth (1950–2019), Indian actress and social worker
- Jatla Siddartha, Indian filmmaker
- Krishnamurthy Siddharth (born 1992), Indian cricketer
- Manimaran Siddharth (born 1998), Indian cricketer
- Nikhil Siddhartha (born 1985), actor in the Telugu film industry in India
- Rajeev Siddhartha (born 1986), Indian actor
- Sushil Siddharth (1958–2018), Indian prose and poetry writer
- Taradevi Siddhartha (born 1953), Indian politician
- V. G. Siddhartha (1958/59–2019), Indian businessman

== Fictional characters ==
- Hayden Siddhartha "Sidd" Finch, fictitious baseball player invented as an April Fools' hoax
- Siddharth aka Appu, main protagonist in Raajakumara, portrayed by Puneeth Rajkumar
- Siddhartha “Sid” Pakam, a character in the Netflix series Grand Army

== Other uses ==
- SIDDHARTA, an experiment at DAFNE electron–positron collider in Italy
- Siddharth University, state university in Uttar Pradesh, India

== See also ==
- Siddha (disambiguation)
- Arth (disambiguation)
- Sidhant
