= Symphony No. 3 (Nørgård) =

- Choral symphony by Per Nørgård
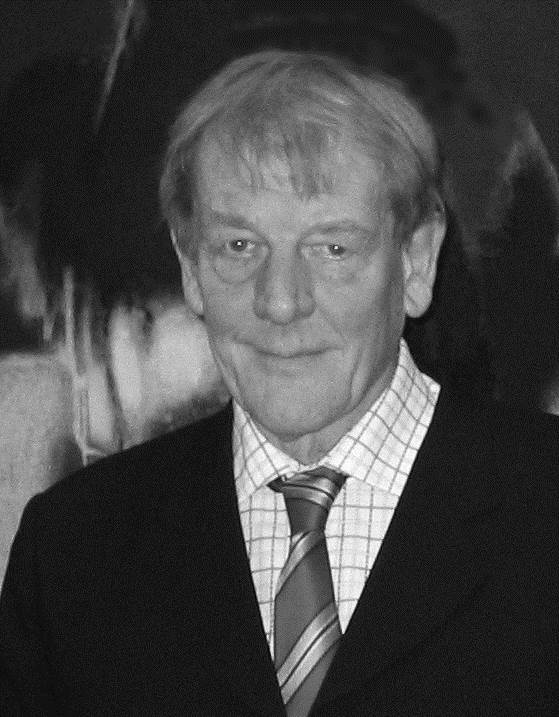
- Nørgård
- Text: Ave maris stella; Rilke: "Singe die Gärten"; Rückert: "Du bist die Ruh'"
- Language: Latin; German
- Composed: 1972–1975
- Duration: c. 50 minutes
- Movements: 2
- Scoring: Orchestra with SATB chorus and soloist

Premiere
- Date: 2 September 1976
- Location: Copenhagen
- Conductor: Herbert Blomstedt
- Performers: Danish National Symphony Orchestra and Choir

Per Nørgård's Symphony No. 3 is a choral symphony, composed between 1972 and 1975 for a vocal soloist, two choirs and a large orchestra. The symphony features the composer's infinity series. Texts used in the second and last movement are the medieval hymn Ave maris stella, Rilke's sonnet "Singe die Gärten" and Rückert's "Du bist die Ruh'" in Schubert's setting. The symphony is part of the Danish Culture Canon.

== History ==
Nørgård believed in symphonies when the form was becoming out of fashion. He was encouraged by Jean Sibelius, whose symphonies Nørgård regarded as "in touch with the timeless forces of existence, with nature in the broadest sense". In 1972, the Music Department of the Danish Radio commissioned Nørgård to create a large-scale symphonic work. The Third Symphony was composed over the next three years, during which Nørgård was given the opportunity to test fragments of his composition with both small ensembles and a full orchestra. Although Nørgård did not normally test his compositions on any instrument, he considered it necessary to determine the limits of perceptible polyphony.

The complete symphony was premiered in Copenhagen on 2 September 1976 by Herbert Blomstedt with the Danish National Symphony Orchestra. It is dedicated to Thomas Dausgaard, the Danish National Symphony Orchestra, Vocal Ensemble and Concert Choir. The symphony was included in the Danish Culture Canon in 2005.

The symphony was performed at the 2018 BBC Proms, in its UK premiere more than 40 years after its completion; Dausgaard conducted the BBC Scottish Symphony Orchestra, the London Voices and the National Youth Chamber Choir of Great Britain. Reviewer Tim Ashley from The Guardian noted that the performers "blended refinement with fierce intensity". Another reviewer called it "craggily uncompromising", sounding "massively organised".

== Music ==
=== Structure and description ===
The compositional process resulted in a number of works before the final form of the symphony was reached, including Lila, Libra, Turn, Spell, and Singe die Gärten.

The symphony has two movements:

1. Moderato
2. Allegretto

In the second movement, various texts are set to music:

- Ave maris stella
- Rilke: "Singe die Gärten" from Die Sonette an Orpheus
- Rückert/Schubert: "Du bist die Ruh'"

The music connects to Sibelius regarding an "organic unfolding" and a "sense of flow". It opens with brass players blowing through their instruments with only breath sounds emerging, mixed with "glacial woodwind and percussion", leading to an entry for the organ. The symphony, as the opera Gilgamesh that Nørgård had composed before, features the composer's infinity series, infinite melodies. The composer also included harmonic series and Fibonacci sequence into his algorithmic composition. Reviewer Colin Clarke found the organised polyphony making "little concession to ease of listening".

The choirs sing in the second movement, first integrated into the orchestra, then more prominently in an "almost jazzy" setting of the medieval Ave maris stella hymn. The choirs then perform a setting of Rilke's "Singe die Gärten, mein Herz, die du nicht kennst" (Sing the gardens, my soul, that you don't know) and the symphony comes to a serene close quoting Rückert's "Du bist die Ruh'" including Schubert's song setting of the text.

The symphony takes about 50 minutes to perform.

=== Instrumentation ===
The symphony is scored for three flutes (1st doubling alto flute, all doubling piccolo), two oboes and cor anglais, two clarinets (both doubling E♭ clarinet), two bassoons and contrabassoon, four horns, three trumpets (1st doubling trumpet in D, 3rd doubling bass trumpet), three trombones, tuba, timpani, at least five percussionists (2 pairs of crash cymbals, sleighbells, tubular bells, crotales, glockenspiel, vibraphone, xylophone, marimba), descant recorder, one or two harps, piano, celesta, organ, strings, and two choirs.

== Recordings ==
- Tamás Vetö with the Danish National Symphony Orchestra (Dacapo, 1989) OCLC 811254310
- Leif Segerstam with the Danish National Radio Choir and Symphony Orchestra (Chandos, 1996) OCLC 811243640
- Thomas Dausgaard with the Danish National Symphony Orchestra (Dacapo, 2008) OCLC 811451860
