= Atemlos (disambiguation) =

Atemlos is an album by Schiller.

Atemlos may also refer to:

- Atemlos Live, a live album by Schiller
- Atemlos, an album by Kai Peterson
- "Atemlos", a song by Nino de Angelo
- "Atemlos", a song by Claudia Jung

== See also ==
- "Atemlos durch die Nacht", a song by Helene Fischer
