= Lilian Looring =

Estonian ballet dancer (1899-1963)

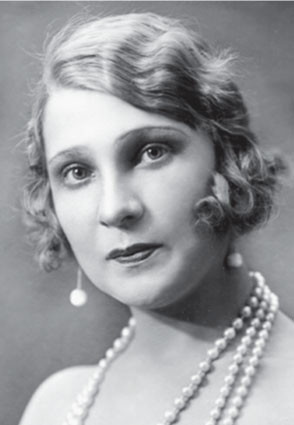
- Lilian Looring Around 1928
- Born: Luise-Liliane Looring; 15 September 1899; Tallinn, Estonia
- Died: 2 May 1963 (aged 63); Tallinn
- Resting place: Metsakalmistu, Tallinn
- Occupations: Ballet dancer, Choreographer

Lilian Looring (born Luise-Liliane Looring; 15 September 1899 – died 2 May 1963) was an Estonian ballet dancer and choreographer.

== Life and Dance ==
Lilian Looring was born in Tallinn. She took her first steps in ballet at the dance studio of Evgenia Litvinova.

In 1918, Looring, along with Amy Holz, Rahel Albury, Robert Rudd, and Cessi Smirnina-Son, was part of the first professional ballet company at the Estonian National Opera in Tallinn, the capital of Estonia. Looring was one of Estonia's first prima ballerinas. She danced in operas and operettas, as well as in dance performances at concerts and theatre productions. She danced alongside the famous Victoria Krieger in Leo Delibes's "Coppélia," the first ballet performed in Estonia on September 28, 1922.

From 1927, Looring worked part-time as a celebrated soloist with the Estonian Ballet. From 1927 to 1931, she performed in various cabarets and on smaller stages throughout Europe, including in Paris, at the Kristallpalast in Dresden, the Wintergarten in Nuremberg, and the Trocadero in Hamburg. In 1930, Looring danced in Switzerland (Locarno, Davos, Zurich). Also in 1930, she returned to Germany and danced at the Deutsches Theater in Munich. In 1932, affected by the Great Depression, she returned to Estonia. From 1932 to 1940, she ran her own ballet studio in Tallinn.

With the Soviet occupation of Estonia in 1941, Lilian Looring was exiled to Siberia. She survived the deportation and her time in Russia. Only after Stalin's death in 1955 was she able to return to her homeland.

== Death ==
Despite influential patrons, she was unable to re-establish herself in the Estonian ballet scene. Looring continued to work as a teacher. She died in 1963 in Tallinn. She was buried in Tallinn's Forest Cemetery.
