= Kalki 2898 AD (soundtrack) =

2024 soundtrack album by Santhosh Narayanan

- Soundtrack album cover

Soundtrack album by Santhosh Narayanan
- Released: 10 July 2024
- Recorded: 2022–2023
- Studios: Future Tense Studios, Chennai
- Genre: Feature film soundtrack
- Length: 13:18
- Language: Telugu
- Label: Saregama
- Producer: Santhosh Narayanan

Santhosh Narayanan chronology
| Anweshippin Kandethum (2024) | Kalki 2898 AD (2024) | Andhagan (2024) |
External audio
- Kalki 2898 AD – Original Sound Track on YouTube

Singles from Kalki 2898 AD
- 1. "Bhairava Anthem" Released: 16 June 2024; 2. "Theme of Kalki" Released: 23 June 2024; 3. "Ta Takkara (Complex Song)" Released: 29 June 2024; 4. "Hope of Shambala" Released: 4 July 2024

Kalki 2898 AD is the soundtrack album composed by Santhosh Narayanan to the 2024 Indian Telugu-language epic dystopian science fiction action film of the same name, directed by Nag Ashwin, starring Amitabh Bachchan, Kamal Haasan, Prabhas and Deepika Padukone. The lyrics are written by Ramajogayya Sastry, Chandrabose and Krishna Kanth in Telugu, Kumaar and Siddharth-Garima in Hindi, Vivek in Tamil, Shyam Muraleedharan in Malayalam and Varadaraj Chikkaballapura in Kannada.

Being Narayanan's 50th film as a composer in his career, the soundtrack album which consisted of six songs was released on 10 July 2024.

== Development and production ==
In mid-2020, the producer C. Aswini Dutt initially insisted on bringing veteran composer M. M. Keeravani to score music for the film, as well as A. R. Rahman also considered for the role; Neither of them did sign the film. In late January 2021, Ashwin recruited composer Mickey J. Meyer, whom he had previously worked with in Mahanati (2018), as a part of the technical crew. By November, speculations arose that Meyer opted out of the project and would be replaced by Santhosh Narayanan as the composer. It was officially confirmed in February 2023, when Dutt stated in an interview regarding Narayanan's inclusion. Narayanan stated that Ashwin had liked his compositions for Cuckoo (2014) which led to his involvement in the film. He spent a year to research the sounds that suited the film's theme and storyline.

When Narayanan was brought onboard for Kalki 2898 AD, almost eight months of the film's production had been completed. During the music discussion, Ashwin insisted the album to be epic, but also need to be soulful. His inspiration for developing the film's music was attributed to Rahman's Academy Award winning score for Slumdog Millionaire (2008), adding "The biggest takeaway was how he did what he does — his own original music — and the world lapped it up and loved it. He didn’t have to cater to a different audience but worked to his strengths. The entire music team surrendered to the vision of the production and the director. Only then we can create something raw and new."

The themes for the four different worlds—Kasi, Shambhala, the Lab and the Complex—he composed specific themes for that, and separately stored them in his system folder under the name "World Boxes". Narayanan personally intended to add the sounds of 1980s and 1990s, as he was a huge fan of Ilaiyaraaja, Rahman and M. S. Viswanathan; he cited the "Bhairava Anthem" as an ode to Ilaiyaraaja, "Veera Dheera" as an ode to Viswanathan, and the treatment of the Mother in lab as an ode to Rahman. The Mahabharata sequence was cited as an ode to S. S. Rajamouli and M. M. Keeravani's works in epic period films. The song "Ta Takkara" was essentially composed to match Prabhas' on-screen presence, but also wanted it to be quirky. This resulted the song being composed in a mix of various genres: dubstep, psychedelic trance, orchestral and Indian folk.

Since the film is set in the future where the remainder of the population are a mix of languages, cultures and communities, he wanted to implement the same in the film's music. Diljit Dosanjh who made his debut with the South Indian film music scene, performed the Punjabi rap in the song "Bhairava Anthem" with lyrics written by Kumaar; he added that the song lyrics will be the same in every language. Likewise, Amitabh Bachchan performed the song "Keshava Madhava" in Hindi, which was retained in other languages. The same goes for the oppari bit, which he originally composed in Tamil. Narayanan described the album as his "ode to the multicultural identity of India".

The songs and score were recorded at Narayanan's Future Tense Studios in Chennai. As Sumathi (SUM-80) being the film's central character, he composed few themes that revolve around her character and also designed three specific sounds for Bhairava as well. To experiment with the music, he travelled to South Africa for recording the percussive sounds using Kika drums and percussions. A glimpse of the film's main theme was performed by Narayanan at his Neeye Oli concert during February 2024.

== Release ==
In May 2024, it was announced that the record label Saregama acquired the marketing and distribution of the film's musical score and soundtrack. The label nearly spent ₹18 crore (US$1.9 million) for the film's music rights. The song "Bujji Theme" was released separately on 27 May 2024. The theme featured vocals performed by Switzerland-based singer Priya Ragu and lyrics written by Japhna Gold.

The first single titled "Bhairava Anthem" was released on 16 June 2024. The music video, which released the following day, featured Prabhas and Diljit Dosanjh in the latter's maiden collaboration. The theme song of the film, "Theme of Kalki", was released as the film's second single on the evening of 23 June 2024 in Lord Krishna's birthplace, Mathura, Uttar Pradesh, along the banks of the Yamuna river. The lyrics for the song were written by Chandrabose, who described the song is about the Dashavatara of Lord Vishnu. The vocals were performed by Kaala Bhairava, Ananthu and Gowtham Bharadwaj. The third single "Ta Takkara (Complex Song)" was released on 29 June 2024. The song featured vocals performed by Sanjith Hegde, Dhee and Santhosh Narayanan. The fourth single titled "Hope of Shambala" was released on 4 July 2024. The song featured vocals performed by Shobana, while Meenakshi Santhosh and Pavithra Chari did so for the dubbed versions.

In early-July 2024, Santhosh Narayanan in his X (formerly Twitter) account, announced that the film's album, which ties up the original songs and score will be released earlier. The soundtrack album was released on 10 July 2024. Along with the earlier released singles, the album also included a sixth song titled "Keshava Madhava" featured the voice of Narayanan (original version) and Amitabh Bachchan (Hindi version) and lyrics written by the duo of Siddharth–Garima in Hindi while Krishna Kanth wrote the Telugu lyrics for the song.

== Track listing ==
Telugu
| No. | Title | Lyrics | Singer(s) | Length |
|---|---|---|---|---|
| 1. | "Bhairava Anthem" | Ramajogayya Sastry, Kumaar | Diljit Dosanjh, Deepak Blue, Santhosh Narayanan | 2:42 |
| 2. | "Theme of Kalki" (Krishna Song) | Chandrabose | Kaala Bhairava, Ananthu, Gowtham Bharadwaj, Chorus | 3:10 |
| 3. | "Ta Takkara" (Complex Song) | Ramajogayya Sastry | Sanjith Hegde, Dhee | 3:28 |
| 4. | "Hope of Shambala" | Ramajogayya Sastry | Shobana | 1:42 |
| 5. | "Keshava Madhava" (Wait of Ashwatthama) | Krishna Kanth | Santhosh Narayanan | 1:30 |
| 6. | "Bujji Theme" | Japhna Gold | Priya Ragu | 0:46 |
| Total length: | | | | 13:18 |

Hindi
| No. | Title | Lyrics | Singer(s) | Length |
|---|---|---|---|---|
| 1. | "Bhairava Anthem" | Kumaar | Diljit Dosanjh,Vijaynarain, Santhosh Narayanan | 2:42 |
| 2. | "Theme of Kalki" | Kumaar | Gowtham Bharadwaj, Chorus | 3:10 |
| 3. | "Ta Takkara" (Complex Song) | Kumaar | Sanjith Hegde, Dhee | 3:28 |
| 4. | "Hope of Shambala" | Siddharth–Garima | Pavithra Chari | 1:42 |
| 5. | "Keshava Madhava" (Wait of Ashwatthama) | Siddharth–Garima | Amitabh Bachchan | 1:30 |
| 6. | "Bujji Theme" | Japhna Gold | Priya Ragu | 0:46 |
| Total length: | | | | 13:18 |

Tamil
| No. | Title | Lyrics | Singer(s) | Length |
|---|---|---|---|---|
| 1. | "Bhairava Anthem" | Vivek, Kumaar | Diljit Dosanjh, Santhosh Narayanan | 2:42 |
| 2. | "Theme of Kalki" | Vivek | Ananthu, Chorus | 3:10 |
| 3. | "Ta Takkara" (Complex Song) | Vivek | Sanjith Hegde, Dhee | 3:28 |
| 4. | "Hope of Shambala" | Vivek | Meenakshi Santhosh | 1:42 |
| 5. | "Keshava Madhava" (Wait of Ashwatthama) | Vivek | S. P. Charan | 1:30 |
| 6. | "Bujji Theme" | Japhna Gold | Priya Ragu | 0:46 |
| Total length: | | | | 13:18 |

Kannada
| No. | Title | Lyrics | Singer(s) | Length |
|---|---|---|---|---|
| 1. | "Bhairava Anthem" | Varadaraj Chikkaballapura, Kumaar | Vijaynarain | 2:42 |
| 2. | "Theme of Kalki" | Varadaraj Chikkaballapura | Gowtham Bharadwaj, Chorus | 3:10 |
| 3. | "Ta Takkara" (Complex Song) | Varadaraj Chikkaballapura | Sanjith Hegde, Dhee | 3:28 |
| 4. | "Hope of Shambala" | Varadaraj Chikkaballapura | Pavithra Chari | 1:42 |
| 5. | "Keshava Madhava" (Wait of Ashwatthama) | Varadaraj Chikkaballapura | S. P. Charan | 1:30 |
| 6. | "Bujji Theme" | Japhna Gold | Priya Ragu | 0:46 |
| Total length: | | | | 13:18 |

Malayalam
| No. | Title | Lyrics | Singer(s) | Length |
|---|---|---|---|---|
| 1. | "Bhairava Anthem" | Shyam Muraleedharan, Kumaar | Vijaynarain | 2:42 |
| 2. | "Theme of Kalki" | Shyam Muraleedharan | Gowtham Bharadwaj, Chorus | 3:10 |
| 3. | "Ta Takkara" (Complex Song) | Shyam Muraleedharan | Sanjith Hegde, Dhee | 3:28 |
| 4. | "Hope of Shambala" | Shyam Muraleedharan | Pavithra Chari | 1:42 |
| 5. | "Keshava Madhava" (Wait of Ashwatthama) | Shyam Muraleedharan | S. P. Charan | 1:30 |
| 6. | "Bujji Theme" | Japhna Gold | Priya Ragu | 0:46 |
| Total length: | | | | 13:18 |

== Background score ==
Kalki 2898 AD

Film score by Santhosh Narayanan
- Released: 11 July 2024
- Genre: Film score
- Length: 50:44
- Language: Telugu
- Label: Saregama
- Producer: Santhosh Narayanan

The film further featured thirty songs in the background score, that was released as a separate album on 11 July 2024 by Saregama.

| No. | Title | Length |
|---|---|---|
| 1. | "The Great War" | 1:08 |
| 2. | "Ashwa Curse" | 0:54 |
| 3. | "Keshava Madhava^{[a]}" | 1:30 |
| 4. | "Pursuit of Life" | 0:58 |
| 5. | "A World Of Treasures" | 2:38 |
| 6. | "Manas" | 1:10 |
| 7. | "Complex Tour" | 1:20 |
| 8. | "Puttinavaniki" | 1:32 |
| 9. | "SUM 80" | 1:17 |
| 10. | "Extraction" | 1:17 |
| 11. | "Yashkin" | 2:16 |
| 12. | "The Child Within" | 1:58 |
| 13. | "Hey Chintoo" | 0:52 |
| 14. | "Boy From Kasi" | 1:06 |
| 15. | "Where Is My Rent?" | 0:51 |
| 16. | "Ashwathama" | 2:24 |
| 17. | "The Escape" | 0:40 |
| 18. | "Kyra" | 2:18 |
| 19. | "Lullaby" | 1:07 |
| 20. | "Meeting Mother" | 1:18 |
| 21. | "Fist Fight" | 3:33 |
| 22. | "Bujji Theme^{[a]}" | 0:46 |
| 23. | "Never Lost a Fight" | 1:17 |
| 24. | "Shambala Rain" | 2:35 |
| 25. | "Shambala" | 2:21 |
| 26. | "Ashwa Vs Ashwa" | 1:06 |
| 27. | "Only Death Wins in War" | 2:18 |
| 28. | "Final Flight" | 2:16 |
| 29. | "Hero" | 1:40 |
| 30. | "Veera Dheera" | 4:05 |
| Total length: | | 50:44 |

Notes

- ^{^a} Tracks 3 and 22 from the original soundtrack, were released within the soundtrack album.

== Reception ==
Sangeetha Devi Dundoo of The Hindu stated "The music too is a bit hit-and-miss. Santhosh Narayanan pays rich homage to the Bhagavad Gita and old Telugu classics, and then stunningly transitions into a futuristic gaming zone realm. However, the songs take some getting used to." Ronak Kotecha of The Times of India wrote "Although the music score by Santhosh Narayanan is a letdown, the background score effectively complements the film's narrative, elevating key moments." Sowmya Rajendran of The News Minute wrote "Santhosh Narayanan’s background score allows the frames to breathe, and this is welcome in an era where the bgm is near-deafening and constant in tentpole films like this. But on the flip side, the score doesn’t do enough to amp up the excitement when it needs to."

A. Ganesh Nadar of Rediff.com wrote "Music by Santhosh Narayanan has no recall value. He does a better job with the background music." Janani K. of India Today wrote "Composer Santhosh Narayanan, with his background music, gave life to the music. The elevation scenes featuring Prabhas, Kamal Haasan, Deepika Padukone and Amitabh Bachchan turned out to be epic because of his score." Kaushik Rajaraman of DT Next wrote "Santhosh Narayanan’s music in the chase sequence and Shambala fight shows why he is still one of the most-preferred music directors in the south." Uday Bhatia of Mint wrote "Santhosh Narayanan’s score does a lot to flesh out these environments, from a chiming theme reminiscent of Dance of the Sugar Plum Fairy to Zimmer-ian strum und drang."

== Album credits ==
Credits adapted from Saregama.

- All music composed, produced, orchestrated, programmed, recorded, mixed and mastered by – Santhosh Narayanan
- Studio – Future Tense Studios, Chennai
- Electronic music production – 6091 (Note: Stage name for Gopikrishnan P. N.)
- Additional programming – OfRo, Aditya Ravindran, Pranav Muniraj, Karthik Manickavasakam, Rupender Venkatesh, 808krishna, (Note: Stage name for Thejas Krishna) Shivakumar Adabala
- Puttinavaniki Voice – Ghantasala
- Flutes and whistles – Santhosh Narayanan
- Irish whistle and woodwinds – Ashish Venkateswaran
- Guitars – Aditya Ravindran
- Kokkarai, udukkai, thambattam – Iniyan Manimaaran
- Percussions – Karthik Vamsi, Siddharth Nagarajan
- Indian percussions – Buddhar Kalaikuzhu
- Saxophone – Aniket Chaturvedi
- Violin – Manoj Kumar
- Kika drums and percussions – Kawanguzi Simon, Baryabireeba Alvin, Kabodha Peter, Tenywa Sosan, Mulindwa Emmanuel, Kikaire Livingston, Bwana Yusuf (coordinated by Kaddu Yusuf)
- Additional Vocals – Dhee, Mahalakshmi Rajagopalan, Ananthu, Meenakshi Elayaraja, Rohit Fernandes, Victor, Santhosh Hariharan, Sreekanth Hariharan, Sudharsan Hemaram, Manikandan Chembai, Mayank Kapri, Viva Rao, Sarthak Kalyani, Aditya Ravindran, Karthik Manickavasakam
- Choir – The Indian Choral Ensemble (conducted by Karthik Manickavasakam)
- Sopranos – Aparna Harikumar, Alisha Mathew Thayil, Sushmita Narasimhan, Nidhi Saraogi, Vani Nandhini, Rutuja Pande, Shwetha Sugathan, Yazhini, Samanvitha Sasidaran, Amritha Rajesh Chelat
- Altos – Nayansee Sharma, Geethu Nirmala, Fathima Henna, Megha Salila, Shruthi Parthasarathy, Shri Bhadra, Varsha R Mallya, Ananya A, Pavithra Chari, Kaaviya S
- Tenors – Akash V H, Sudarshan HemaRam, Keshav Vinod, Shivsundar R, Shridhar Ramesh, Manoj Krishna, Shibi Srinivas, Dhiyanathiru, Nikhilchandran D S, Arshith Kurian, Chirag Shetty, Manikandan Chembai, Joseph George, Ebenezer
- Basses – Regis Tony, Shyam Krishna, Prashanth Mohanasundaram, Cyril Solomon, Neeraj Selvaganapathy, Soloman Ravindar
- Additional orchestrations (strings, brass, woodwinds) – Karthik Manickavasakam
- Orchestra – FAME'S Skopje Studio Orchestra
- Orchestra conductor – Oleg Kondratenko
- Sound recordist – Arber Curri
- Pro-tools operator – Marina Lefkova
- Stage managers – Riste Trajkovski, Ilija Grkovski, Filip Popov
- Orchestra co-ordinator – Joshua Rodrigues at Bohemia Junction Limited
- Additional recording – Karthik Manickavasakam, Pranav Muniraj,
- Recording engineers – Rupendar Venkatesh, Joshua D. Fernandez
- Studio Assistance – Jabaraj
- Musicians Coordinator – Meenakshi Santhosh
