= Siddharth Menon =

Siddharth Menon may refer to:

- Siddharth Menon (singer), Malayalam singer and actor
- Siddharth Menon (actor), Marathi and Hindi film actor

== See also ==
- Siddhartha (disambiguation), for others with similar name
