= Siddhartha (Nørgård) =

Siddhartha is an opera-ballet by Per Nørgård to a libretto by Ole Sarvig. Written 1974–79, it was premiered at the Royal Opera in Stockholm in 1983.

The piece is based on a novella by Hermann Hesse and is set entirely in the garden of Kapilavastu palace. Influenced by the artist Adolf Wölfli, Nørgård made some changes to the score in 1984.

== Recording ==
- Edith Guillaume, Stig Fogh Andersen, Tina Kiberg, Aage Haugland, Erik Harbo, Kim Janken, Poul Elming, Christian Christiansen, Minna Nyhus, Birgitte Frieboe, Anne Frellesvig, Gert Mortensen, DR KoncertKoret, DR SymfoniOrkestret, Jan Latham-Koenig Dacapo OCLC 705275337
