= Kai Peterson =

Actor, voice talent, music producer, composer, lyricist, and singer (born 1962)

Kai Peterson (stage name), (born 1962 né Kai-Peter Sauer in Hannover, Lower Saxony, Germany) is an actor, voice talent, music producer, composer, lyricist and singer in the genres musical theater, Jazz, Soul and Funk. He took his stage name Kai Peterson in 1989, but since his marriage with Karen Henry his legal name is Kai-Peter Henry.

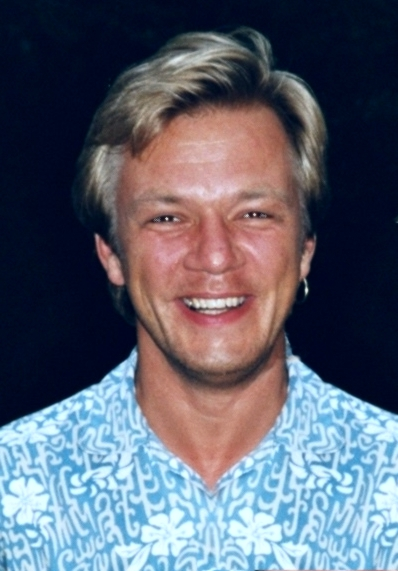
Kai Peterson – 2009

== personal life ==
Kai Peterson is the first of two children born to Peter Petrel und Hede-Birgit. He has two sisters. Since 1990 he is living in Vienna, Austria, with his wife and two sons.

== professional life ==
Kai Peterson is on the board of the austrian voice talent association VOICE, a board member of the austrian musicians guild and one of the artists works council at the VBW.

=== actor ===
Kai Peterson appeared on stage in the following theater productions, revues, events and concerts:

- 1979–80

THE FARMER AS MILLIONAIRE (Raimund) – "Wurzel" – FWS Hannover THE RHINOCEROSES (E.Unesco) – "Der Ältere Herr" – FWS Hannover

- 1982 – 86

Club & Tour with the bands... EXIT 55 COMMUNICATION JOY & PAIN FUN KEY B. BODY & SOUL

- 1987

FANTASTICO (R.A.I.) – "Corista" – THEATRO D. VICTORIE ROMA ARGENT DE POCHE (Jazz Band) – FONCLEA ROMA

- 1988

LOVE OR WAR (director: Lothar Höfgen) – State Opera Hannover

- 1989

QUASIMODO (dir.: Maria Caleita) – „Phöbus", Münchener Schauspielbühne /Tour Germany-Austria-Switzerland

- 1990–92

WEST SIDE STORY (dir.: Anna Vaughn) – „Diesel/Tony", County Theatre Innsbruck FREUDIANA (dir.: Peter Weck) – „ERIK / 9. Member", Theater an der Wien BEST OF MUSICALS (dir.: Kim Duddy) – member since 1990

- 1992

ROCKY HORROR SHOW (dir.: Alexander Goebel) – „Rocky", Summerstock Amstetten BEST OF MUSICALS (dir.: Kim Duddy) – member since 1990

- 1993

MUSICAL ? ‘OH MY GOD !’ (dir.: A. Goebel) – Musical Revue – Applaus Theater + Concert Hall Vienna TRAUMMANIA (dir.: Peter Lauscher) – „Tamino", County Theatre Mecklenburg / ORF / NDR 20th BIRTHDAY CELEBRATION ROCKY HORROR SHOW (d.:A.Goebel) – „Rocky", Raimund Theater Wien ELISABETH (dir.: Harry Kupfer) – „Count Schwarzenberg", Theater an der Wien BEST OF MUSICALS (dir.: Kim Duddy) – member since 1990

- 1994

ELISABETH (Reg./dir.: Harry Kupfer) – „Count Schwarzenberg", Theater an der Wien TRAUMMANIA (Reg./dir.: Peter Lauscher) – „Tamino", Landestheater/County Theatre Mecklenburg / ORF / NDR AN EVE. IN MAJOR AND MINOR (R./d.:Kai Peterson) – Personality Show with guests, Residenztheater Vienna WEST SIDE STORY (R./d.: Heinz Ehrenfreund) – „Tony", Summerstock Amstetten SCHNEWITTCHEN Kindermusical / SNOW WHITE kidsmusical (Peter Rapp) – „Prince Charming", Akzent Theater Wien BEST OF MUSICALS (Reg./dir.: Kim Duddy) – member since 1990 BLUE MOON EXPERIENCE „SLEEPWALKING" – Multi Media Show (for MERCEDES, IBM, McDONALDS, VW-SKODA a.o.)

- 1995

TRAUMMANIA (dir.: Peter Lauscher) – „Tamino", County Theatre Mecklenburg / ORF / NDR SNOW WHITE kidsmusical (Peter Rapp) – „Prince Charming", Akzent Theater Wien BEST OF MUSICALS (dir.: Kim Duddy) – member since 1990 BLUE MOON EXPERIENCE „SLEEPWALKING" – Multi Media Show (or MERCEDES, IBM, McDONALDS, VW-SKODA a.o.) CASINO X-MAS SHOW (dir.: Ruppert Henning) – Revue mit versch. Gästen/ revue with various guests, Casino Baden

- 1996 + 1997

BLUE MOON EXPERIENCE „SLEEPWALKING" – Multi Media Show (for MERCEDES, IBM, McDONALDS, VW-SKODA a.o..) BEST OF MUSICALS (dir.: Kim Duddy) – member since 1990 BLONDEL (dir.: Werner Sobotka) – „Richard the lionhearted", Summerstock Amstetten VIENNA MUSICAL PROJECT SOUTH AMERICAN TOUR (dir.: K. Peterson), MS Arkona BEST OF MUSICALS (Reg./dir.: Kim Duddy) – Mitglied/member seit/since 1990 DIE NACHT DER MUSICALS /BROADWAY MUSICAL NIGHT (A.+A. Diepold), musical revue tour production (Austria+Germany) BLUE MOON EXPERIENCE „SLEEPWALKING" – Multi Media Show (Für/for MERCEDES, IBM, McDONALDS, VW-SKODA u.v.a.) MAIN STREETs „KAMBÄCK TOUR" " – Club Tour AUSTRIA

- 1998 + 1999

VIENNA MUSICAL PROJECT MEDITERANIAN CRUISE (Reg./dir.: K. Peterson), MS AZUR MAIN STREETs „KAMBÄCK TOUR" " – Club Tour AUSTRIA BEST OF MUSICALS (Reg./dir.: Kim Duddy) – Mitglied/member seit/since 1990 "DIE DREI VON DER TANKSTELLE" (R.:/d.:N. Büchel) – „Willi", Musical-theater Production of a twenties Movie, METROPOL WIEN CARL ORFFs "BERNAUERIN" (R./d.: T. Langhoff) – „Announcer", VOLKSOPER WIEN BEST OF MUSICALS (Reg./dir.: Kim Duddy) – Mitglied/member seit/since 1990 MAIN STREETs „WÖDHIZ OHNE KAPÖN" – a cappella comedy -Club tour Germany/Austria

- 2000

MAIN STREETs „WÖDHITS. OHNE KAPÖN" – a cappella comedy -Club tour Germany/Austria THE HUNCHBACK OF NOTRE DAME (dir.:R. Diepold) – "Quasimodo"- EUROPEAN TOUR BEST OF MUSICALS (Reg./dir.: Kim Duddy) – Mitglied/member seit/since 1990 VIENNA MUSICAL COMPANY "Best of Andrew Lloyd Webber"(R.:/dir.: Dean Welterlen) – Finkenstein Ruin MONTEZUMA'S REVENGE "Double Density"(dir.: Felix DeRooy) – a cappella pop/multidea show – Tour, Netherlands-Germany

- 2001

MONTEZUMA'S REVENGE "Double Density"(dir.: Felix DeRooy) – a cappella pop/multidea show – Tour, Netherlands-Germany-Austria BEST OF MUSICALS (dir.: S. Ziegler) – Singer/Soloist – BURGARENA FINKENSTEIN THE CHRYSTAL CHRISTMAS SHOW (d.:Andrew Morris) – "Engelbert" – CASINO BADEN

- 2002

Cooking With Elvis by Lee Hall (dir. Harald Posch) – "Dad" – THEATER IN DER DRACHENGASSE WIEN CHRISTMAS WITH FRIENDS (d.:Andrew Morris) – "Kai" (the 4 Angels) – CASINO BADEN THE BEST OF MUSICALS (d.: Herwig Gratzer) – "Soloist" – STADTHEATER KLAGENFURT WAKE UP (d.: Phillippe Arlaud) – "2. Jeff/various" – RAIMUNDTHEATER WIEN

- 2003 + 2004

WAKE UP (d.: Phillippe Arlaud) – "2. Jeff/various" – RAIMUNDTHEATER WIEN A CHRISTMAS CAROL (d: Katja Thost-Hauser) – "Bob Crachit" – FORUM WIEN

- 2005

ROMEO & JULIA (d.: Rheda Benteifour) – "Prince Of Verona / Lord Capulet / Lorenzo" – RAIMUNDTHEATER WIEN THE 3 MUSKETEERS (d: Katja Thost-Hauser) – "Aramis" – SEELBACH BEST OF MUSICALS – Singer/Soloist – BURGARENA FINKENSTEIN A CHRISTMAS CAROL (d: Katja Thost-Hauser) – "Bob Crachit" – FORUM WIEN

- 2006

ROMEO & JULIA (d.: Rheda Benteifour) – " Lord Capulet alternate / Prince Of Verona / Lorenzo" – RAIMUNDTHEATER WIEN BEST OF MUSICALS – Singer/Soloist – BURGARENA FINKENSTEIN REBECCA (d.: Francesca Zambello) – " Judge Horridge/Jack Favell/Col. Julyan " – RAIMUNDTHEATER WIEN

- 2007

REBECCA (d.: Francesca Zambello) – " Judge Horridge/Jack Favell/Col. Julyan " – RAIMUNDTHEATER WIEN BEST OF MUSICALS (dir.: S. Ziegler) – Singer/Soloist – BURGARENA FINKENSTEIN

- 2008

DIE ZOOGESCHICHTE/THE ZOOSTORY (d.:Reinfried Schiessler) – " Peter" – SCHUBERTTHEATER WIEN REBECCA (d.: Francesca Zambello) – " Judge Horridge/Jack Favell/Col. Julyan " – RAIMUNDTHEATER WIEN

- 2009

RUDOPLH – AFFAIRE MAYERLING (d.: DAVID LEVAUX) – "Moritz Szepps/Edward POW" – RAIMUNDTHEATER WIEN

- 2010

RUDOPLH – AFFAIRE MAYERLING (dir.: DAVID LEVAUX) -"Moritz Szepps/Edward POW" – RAIMUNDTHEATER WIEN ICH WAR NOCH NIEMALS IN NEW YORK (d.: Carline Bouwer) – "Axel/Captain/Ensemble" – RAIMUNDTHEATER WIEN

- 2011 + 2012

ICH WAR NOCH NIEMALS IN NEW YORK (d.: Carline Bouwer) – "Axel/Captain/Ensemble" – RAIMUNDTHEATER WIEN ICH WAR NOCH NIEMALS IN NEW YORK (d.: Carline Bouwer) – "Axel/Captain" – APOLLO THEATER STUTTGART

== discography ==
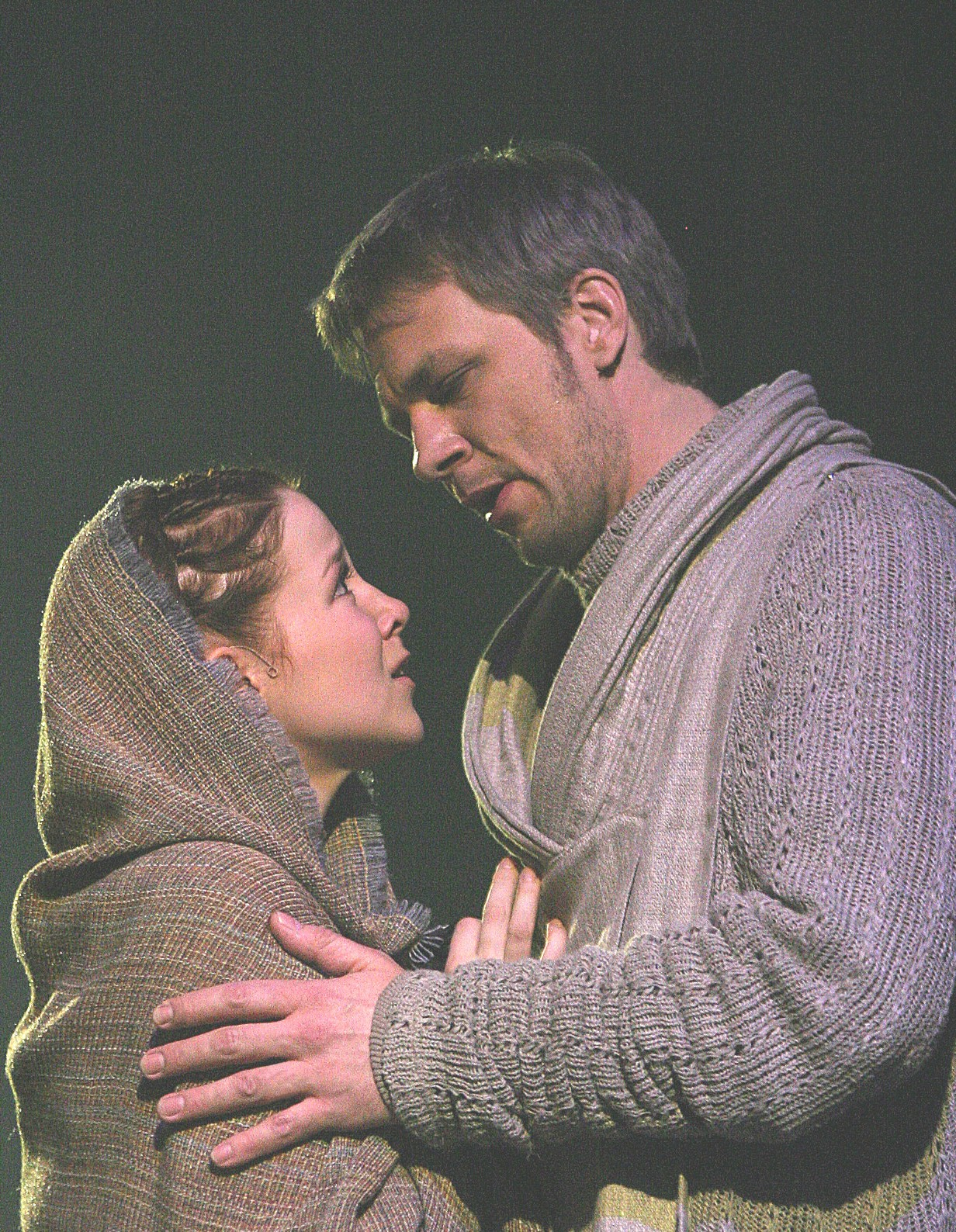
Kai Peterson in ROMEO & JULIA as Lorenzo – Raimundtheater, Vienna (Austria)

=== producer ===
(album – artist – label)

- Mix It Up (Kai Peterson) – Co-Producer DOUBLE YOU REC
- Go with the Flow Of Time (Kai Peterson) – Co-Producer DOUBLE YOU REC.
- Vienna BLUES Vol.1 (various) – Producer SOUL MADE PRODUCTIONS
- Slide (Cedric) – Producer SOUL MADE PRODUCTIONS
- Wödhits.Ohne Kapö'n (Main Street) – Producer SOUL MADE PRODUCTIONS
- A Cappella (Main Street) – Producer SOUL MADE PRODUCTIONS
- Double Density Live "Ambivalence" (Montezuma's Revenge) – Producer MULTIDISK
- Deep in Your Soul (Mark Janicello) – Producer MUSICA
- I glaub des kannst vagessn (Menschenfreund) – Producer SOUL MADE PRODUCTIONS
- Mehr als Jedes Wort (Thomas Borchert) Executive Producer SOUL MADE PRODUCTIONS
- Ruthless Lovesongs (Thomas Borchert) – Producer SOUL MADE PRODUCTIONS
- thomas' tierische themen (Thomas Borchert) – Producer SOUL MADE PRODUCTIONS
- Deep in Your Soul:::Sundance Music:::Crossover Jazz 2 (Peter Petrel) – Executive Producer SOUL MADE PRODUCTIONS
- Borchert DeLuxe (Thomas Borchert) – Producer (soul-made.com)
- I.V. (International Victim) – Executive Producer SOUL MADE PRODUCTIONS
- A Man Like Me (Alvin Le-Bass) – Producer SOUL MADE PRODUCTIONS
- Strictly Musical – live (Thomas Borchert) – Producer SOUL MADE PRODUCTIONS
- Mastermind (Kai Peterson) – Producer SOUL MADE PRODUCTIONS

=== singer ===
(album – artist – label)

- "Mastermind" – EXIT 55 – Exit 55
- "Man at the Bus Stop" – QUIET FORCE- Peppermint Park Records
- "Love Or War" – FUN KEY B. – Peppermint Park Rec.
- "FREUDIANA – DEUTSCHE ORIGINAL AUFNAHME" – EMI-ELECTROLA
- "Mix It Up" – KAI PETERSON – Double You Rec.
- "Stay With Me" – MAIN STREET – Thema Rec.
- "Go with the Flow Of Time" – KAI PETERSON- Double You Rec.
- "The Best Of Musicals" – VIENNA MUSICAL COMPANY – Double You Rec.
- "Highlights aus Film und Musicals" – BLUE MOON EXPERIENCE – PG Rec.
- "So They Say/Vienna BLUES Vol.1" – THOMAS BORCHERT & KAI PETERSON – SOUL MADE PRODUCTIONS
- "Theme Song/SANTA CLAUS X -mas Musical" mit/with SANDRA PIRES – Gabriel Rec.
- "A Cappella" – MAIN STREET – SOUL MADE PRODUCTIONS
- "DIE DREI VON DER TANKSTELLE" – Musical Original Aufnahme – BMG
- "Wödhits. Ohne Kapö'n" – MAIN STREET – SOUL MADE PRODUCTIONS
- "Double Density" – MONTEZUMA'S REVENGE – Double Density – Zuma Records
- "Here I Am" – SANDRA PIRES – BMG-AUSTRIA
- "Moment Of Glory" – SCORPIONS – Moment of Glory – EMI London-Classics
- "Atemlos" – ATEMLOS – EDEL
- "Diverse" V.S.O.P. – DINO
- "Diverse" – LEANDRO – EDEL
- "WAKE UP – Original Cast Recording" – BMG
- "Borchert DeLuxe" – THOMAS BORCHERT – SOUL MADE PRODUCTIONS
- "ROMEO & JULIA – Original German Cast Recording" – Hit Squad/BMG
- "REBECCA – Original Cast Recording" – Hit Squad/BMG
- "A Little Bit Of Hope" – KAI PETERSON & THE RENS NEWLAND MIXTET – jive music Austria
- "A Man Like Me" – ALVIN LE-BASS – SOUL MADE PRODUCTIONS
- "Mastermind" – KAI PETERSON and BIG BAND – SOUL MADE PRODUCTIONS
