= Der göttliche Tivoli =

Det guddomelige Tivoli (The Divine Circus) is a 1982 opera by Per Nørgård. The opera portrays the schizophrenic Swiss artist Adolf Wölfli (1864–1930) from his harsh upbringing in Switzerland to the asylum where Wölfli spent 30 years while producing his artworks. Originally composed in Danish the opera was recorded on disc for the first time in 2008 at a performance by Stadttheater Bern in German.

== Recording ==
- Der Göttliche Tivoli (sung in German) Bernd Gebhardt (bass-baritone), Fabienne Jost (soprano), Steffen Kubach (baritone), Jianeng Lu (tenor), Tadahiro Masujima (tenor), Sandra Rohrbach (mezzo-soprano), Simone Tschöke (contralto), Andrea Stadel (soprano), Daniel Szeili (tenor) & Hubert Wild (baritone) Dorian Keilhack SACD – 2 discs Dacapo OCLC 1239736216
