= Sidhant =

Sidhant is an Indian masculine given name. Notable people with the name include:

- Sidhant Dobal (born 1993), Indian cricketer
- Sidhant Gupta (born 1989), Indian actor
- Sidhant Mohapatra (born 1966), Indian actor
- Sidhant Singh (born 2000), Singaporean cricketer

== See also ==
- Siddhartha
