= Per Nørgård =

Danish composer (1932–2025)

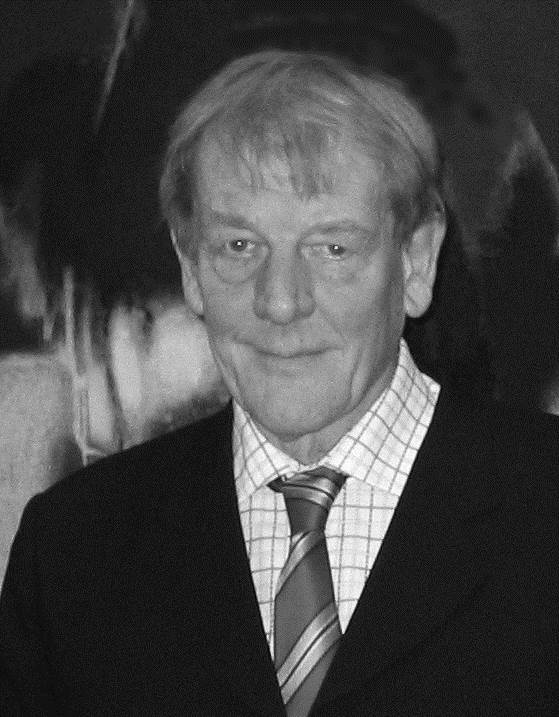
- Born: 13 July 1932; Gentofte, Denmark
- Died: 28 May 2025 (aged 92); Copenhagen, Denmark
- Education: Royal Danish Academy of Music
- Occupations: Composer; Music theorist
- Organizations: Royal Danish Conservatory of Music; Royal Academy of Music, Aarhus/Aalborg
- Awards: Ernst von Siemens Music Prize

Per Nørgård (pronounced [ˈpʰɛɐ̯ ˈnɶɐ̯ˌkɒˀ]; 13 July 1932 – 28 May 2025) was a Danish composer and music theorist. Though his style varied considerably throughout his career, his music often included repeatedly evolving melodies, in the vein of Jean Sibelius, and a perspicuous focus on lyricism. He based music on "infinity series" and other mathematical models. He composed large-scale works, eight symphonies including the choral Third, concertos and operas such as Gilgamesh. His chamber music includes ten string quartets and music for guitar. Some later works were inspired by the art of Adolf Wölfli.

The composer Julian Anderson called Nørgård's style "one of the most personal in contemporary music". Nørgård received several awards, including the 2016 Ernst von Siemens Music Prize.

== Life and career ==
Per Nørgård was born in Gentofte, a suburb of Copenhagen on 13 July 1932. His father was a tailor, and he grew up with an elder brother. He learned to play the piano as a boy.

He studied composition with Vagn Holmboe privately at age 17. Fascinated by the sound world of Jean Sibelius, he visited the composer in person, receiving encouragement. He then studied formally at Royal Danish Academy of Music in Copenhagen, with Holmboe, Finn Høffding, and Herman David Koppel. From 1956 to 1957, he studied in Paris with Nadia Boulanger.

Nørgård soon gained teaching positions, first at the Odense Conservatory in 1958, and then at the Royal Danish Conservatory of Music in 1960. His students at the latter included the composer Carl Davis. Between 1958 and 1962, Nørgård had a stint as a music critic for the newspaper Politiken. He left these positions in 1965 to teach composition at the Royal Academy of Music, Aarhus/Aalborg. There, he taught many composers who went on to have major careers, including Hans Abrahamsen, Hans Gefors, Karl Aage Rasmussen, and Bent Sørensen. Thomas Adès, Britta Byström, Wolfgang Rihm, Poul Ruders, Esa-Pekka Salonen, and Sven-David Sandström count him as an influence.

In his early compositions, Nørgård was strongly influenced by the Nordic styles of Sibelius, Carl Nielsen, and Vagn Holmboe. In the 1960s, he began exploring the modernist techniques of central Europe, eventually developing a serial compositional system based on the "infinity series", which he used in his Voyage into the Golden Screen, the Second and Third Symphonies, I Ching, and other works of the late 1960s and '70s. His Third Symphony, with a vocal soloist and choir, became popular, performed at the 2018 BBC Proms and included in the Danish Culture Canon. Later, Nørgård became interested in the Swiss artist Adolf Wölfli, who inspired many of Nørgård's works, including the Fourth Symphony, the opera Det Guddommelige Tivoli, Papalagi for solo guitar, and Wie ein Kind for choir.

Nørgård composed works in all major genres, including six operas, two ballets, eight symphonies and other pieces for orchestra, several concertos, choral and vocal works, many chamber works (among them ten string quartets), and several solo instrumental works. These include a number of works for guitar, mostly written for the Danish guitarist Erling Møldrup: In Memory Of... (1978), Papalagi (1981), a series of suites called Tales from a Hand (1985–2001), Early Morn (1997–98), and Rondino Amorino (1999). One of his most important works for percussion solo is I Ching (1982), written for the Danish percussionist Gert Mortensen. His piano work Many Returns to Bali was written for the Indonesian pianist Ananda Sukarlan to commemorate the 2002 Bali bombings. He also composed several film scores, including The Red Cloak (1966), Babette's Feast (1987), and Hamlet, Prince of Denmark (1993).

His Eighth Symphony was premiered on 19 September 2012 at the Helsinki Music Centre, Finland, by the Helsinki Philharmonic Orchestra conducted by John Storgårds. Heikki Valska of Finnish radio called the symphony "very bright and lyrical" and "approachable". It was well received by the audience at the premiere. It was later recorded by the Vienna Philharmonic Orchestra conducted by Sakari Oramo.

Nørgård was also a prolific writer who authored many articles about music from not only a technical but also a philosophical viewpoint.

== Personal life ==
Nørgård married Anelise Brix Thomson in 1956. They had two children together. He married his second wife Helle Rahbek in 1966. She died in 2022.

Nørgård died after a long illness at a senior citizens' home in Copenhagen, on 28 May 2025, at the age of 92. He was regarded as Denmark's most prominent composer since Nielsen.

== Infinity series ==
Tree of Nørgård's melodic infinity series

Nørgård's music often uses the infinity series (Danish Uendelighedsrækken) to serialize melody, harmony, and rhythm. The method takes its name from the endlessly self-similar nature of the resulting musical material, comparable to fractal geometry. Mathematically, the infinity series is an integer sequence. "Invented in an attempt to unify in a perfect way repetition and variation," the first few terms of its simplest form are 0, 1, −1, 2, 1, 0, −2, 3, −1, 2, 0, 1, 2, −1, −3, 4.

Uendelighedsrækken: diatonic infinity series (the first 16 terms), 0=G

Uendelighedsrækken: diatonic G major (the first 32 terms) with numbers=scale steps and 0=A

Uendelighedsrækken: chromatic pitches (the first 16 terms) centered around G

Tree of Nørgård's rhythmic infinity series (Fibonacci sequence)

Nørgård discovered the melodic infinity series in 1959 and it inspired many of his works in the 1960s. But only with Voyage into the Golden Screen for small ensemble (1968)—which has been called the first "properly instrumental piece of spectral composition"—and Symphony No. 2 (1970) did he begin structuring entire works with the series. The harmonic and rhythmic infinity series were developed in the early 1970s and the three series were first integrated in Nørgård's Symphony No. 3.

== Compositions ==
Nørgård's works include:

=== Operas ===
- Labyrinten (The Labyrinth) (1963)
- Gilgamesh (1972)
- Siddharta (1974–79)
- Der göttliche Tivoli (The Divine Circus) (1983)
- Orfeus: Den uendelige sang (Orpheus: The Endless Song) (1988)
- Nuit des Hommes (1996)

=== Orchestral ===
- Symphonies
  - Symphony No. 1 Sinfonia austera (1953–55)
  - Symphony No. 2 (1970)
  - Symphony No. 3 (1972–75), a choral symphony
  - Symphony No. 4 Indian Rose Garden and Chinese Witch's Lake (1981)
  - Symphony No. 5 (1987–90)
  - Symphony No. 6 At the End of the Day (1999)
  - Symphony No. 7 (2004–06)
  - Symphony No. 8 (2010–11)
- Metamorfosi (1954), for strings
- Constellations (1958), for strings
- Iris (1966)
- Luna (1967)
- Voyage into the Golden Screen (1968)
- Dream Play (1975)
- Twilight (1977)
- Burn (1984)
- Spaces of Time (1991), for orchestra with piano
- Night-Symphonies, Day Breaks (1992), for chamber orchestra
- Aspects of Leaving (1997)
- Terrains Vagues (2000–2001)
- Lysning (2006)

=== Concertante ===
- Piano
  - Rhapsody in D for Piano and Orchestra (1952)
  - Piano Concerto Concerto in due tempi (1994–95)
- Violin
  - Violin Concerto No. 1 Helle Nacht (1986–87)
  - Violin Concerto No. 2 Borderlines (2002)
- Cello
  - Cello Concerto No. 1 Between (1985)
  - Cello Concerto No. 2 Momentum (2009)
  - Cantica Concertante (2012), for cello and ensemble
- Harp
  - Harp Concerto No. 1 King, Queen and Ace (1988), for harp and 13 instruments
  - Harp Concerto No. 2 Gennem torne (Through Thorns) (2003), for harp, flute, clarinet and string quartet
- Percussion
  - Percussion Concerto No. 1 For a Change (1983)
  - Percussion Concerto No. 2 Bach to the Future (1997), for two percussionists and orchestra
- Accordion Concerto Recall (1968)
- Viola Concerto Remembering Child (1986)
- Three Nocturnal Movements (2019), for violin, cello and ensemble

=== Wind and brass ensemble ===
- Musaic (1969), for brass ensemble and electronic tape
- Modlys (Backlight) (1970), for wind ensemble
- Fanfara Nervosa (1999), for brass ensemble
- Massifs – Crystals – Cascades (2004), for 12 trombones

=== Chamber and instrumental ===
- String Quartets
  - String Quartet No. 1 Quartetto Breve (1952)
  - String Quartet No. 2 Quartetto Brioso (1958)
  - String Quartet No. 3 Three Miniatures (1959)
  - String Quartet No. 4 Quartet in 3 Spheres (1969), for string quartet with tape
  - String Quartet No. 5 Inscape (1969)
  - String Quartet No. 6 Tintinnabulary (1986)
  - String Quartet No. 7 (1994)
  - String Quartet No. 8 Night Descending like Smoke (1997)
  - String Quartet No. 9 Into the Source (2001)
  - String Quartet No. 10 Harvest Timeless (2005)
- Clarinet Trios (clarinet, cello, piano)
  - Clarinet Trio No. 1 (1955)
  - Clarinet Trio No. 2 Spell (1973)
  - Clarinet Trio No. 3 Lin (1986)
- Flute Quintet (1953), for flute, violin, viola, cello and piano
- Solo Intimo (1953), for cello
- Arcana (1970), for percussion, electric guitar and accordion
- Whirl's World (1970), for wind quintet
- Cantica (1977), for cello and piano
- Proteus (1980), for flute and percussion
- Sonora (1981), for flute and harp
- I Ching (1982), for solo percussion
- Syn (Vision) (1988), for brass quintet
- Strings (1992), for string trio
- Scintillation (1993), for septet of flute, clarinet, horn, violin, viola, cello and piano
- Roads to Ixtlan (1993), for 4 saxophones
- Wild Swans (1994), for 4 saxophones
- Dancers Around Jupiter (1995), for 4 saxophones
- Winter Music (1998), for flute, clarinet, percussion, organ, guitar and cello
- It's All His Fancy That (2003), for trumpet, trombone and piano
- Delta (2005), for saxophone, cello and piano
- Trio Breve (2012), for piano trio

=== Piano and keyboard ===
- Piano Sonata No. 1 (1953)
- Piano Sonata No. 2 (1957)
- Partita Concertante (1958), for organ
- Grooving (1968), for piano
- Canon (1971), for organ
- Turn (1973), for piano
- Trepartita (1988), for organ
- Remembering (1989), for piano
- Gemini Rising (1990), for harpsichord
- Many Returns to Bali (2003), for piano
- Waterways (2008), for piano

=== Vocal and choral ===
- The Dommen (Judgement), for vocalists, choir, children's choir and orchestra
- Libra (1973), for tenor, choir, guitar and two vibraphones
- Singe die Gärten (1974), for choir and 8 instruments
- Nova genitura (1975), for soprano and ensemble
- Fons Laetitiae (1975), for soprano and harp
- Winter Cantata (1976), for soprano, choir, organ and optional ensemble
- Now all the Earth is White with Snow (1976), for choir and brass
- Frostsalme (1976), for 16-part choir
- Cycle (1977), for 12-part choir
- Seadrift (1978), for soprano and ensemble
- Wie ein Kind (Like a Child), for choir (1979–80)
- And Time Shall Be No More, for choir (1994)
- Ut rosa (2000), for choir
- Mytisk Morgen (2000), for choir and bass clarinet
- Morgen-Meditation (2002), for choir and bass clarinet
- Lygtemændene tager til byen (The Will-o'-the-wisps go to Town) (2004), cantata for voices, choir and orchestra

== Writings ==
- Nørgård, Per (1973–1974). "Gilgamesh – en 5000-årig aktualitet" [Gilgamesh – A 5000-year-old Topicality]. Nutida Musik (in Danish). 17 (1): 5–7.
- —— (1975) [1974]. Inside a Symphony (PDF). Translated by L. K. Christensen. Numus-West 2, no. 2: 4–16
- —— (1982). Hansen, Ivan (ed.). Per Nørgård artikler 1962–1982 [Per Nørgård articles 1962–1982] (in Danish). Copenhagen: København. OCLC 465831476.
- —— (1985–1986). "Hastighed og acceleration" [Speed and acceleration]. Dansk Musiktidsskrift (in Danish). 60: 179–186.
- —— (1986–1987). "Flerdimensionaler agogik" [Multidimensional agogics]. Dansk Musiktidsskrift (in Danish). 61: 19–25.

== Awards ==
- Lili Boulanger Prize (1957)
- Nordic Council Music Prize (1974) for his opera Gilgamesh
- Léonie Sonning Music Prize (1996; Denmark)
- Wihuri Sibelius Prize (2006)
- Marie-Josée Kravis Prize for New Music (2014)
- Ernst von Siemens Music Prize (2016)
