= Eating Our Way to Extinction =

2021 documentary film by Ludo Brockway

- Directed by: Ludo Brockway; Otto Brockway
- Produced by: Ludo Brockway; Mark Galvin; Kian Tavakkoli
- Narrated by: Kate Winslet
- Edited by: Otto Brockway
- Production company: Broxstar Productions
- Release date: October 1, 2021
- Running time: 81 minutes
- Country: United Kingdom
- Language: English

Eating Our Way to Extinction is a 2021 documentary film, which focuses on the problem of unsustainable meat production and its effects on the environment.

The documentary premiered in London and Los Angeles in September 2021, where it was then made available for online streaming.

== Synopsis ==
The film addresses the problem of unsustainable meat production and highlights the consequences such as deforestation, increasing air and water pollution, and the resulting destruction of resources.

The film combines journalism, scientific quotes and graphics, personal interviews and investigative reporting, following in the footsteps of other climate change films like Cowspiracy and Seaspiracy.

The documentary conveys the following key messages:

- The oceans are being overfished and polluted by abandoned fishing nets. We rely on oceanic organisms for much of the oxygen we breathe and must keep them healthy.
- Animal agriculture is widely acknowledged as a likely point of origin for the next global pandemic.
- Governing entities are funded and manipulated by the animal agriculture industry which pours millions of dollars into lobbying and politics.
- Animal agriculture is a leading cause of deforestation.
- Eating a whole-food, plant-based diet is healthy for people across life stages and even athletes thrive on this diet.
- In order to ensure that the environment survives as we know it for generations to come, we must make changes.
- The most impactful personal change we can make is to adopt a plant-based diet.

== Production ==
The film was created, written and directed jointly by British brothers Otto and Ludovic 'Ludo' Brockway, who began the project in 2016 after a successful crowdfunding campaign. The two brothers are based in London and co-founded their production company Broxstar Productions together. The production company had previously produced a commercial for Virgin Galactic and a short film titled PLANET EARTH - As We Eat Our Way to Extinction (2015) for Mercy for Animals which acted as a precursor to the documentary. The short film was promoted by American actor Leonardo DiCaprio, who called it "the video future generations will be wishing everyone watched today.” Production on the film began in 2017 and lasted for five years. Filming took place in Brazil, Mongolia, Norway, Spain, Taiwan, the United Kingdom and the United States. The Brockway brothers partnered up with Other World Computing, who assisted with the technology used for filming.

The documentary is narrated by actress Kate Winslet and includes appearances by business magnate Richard Branson and marine biologist Sylvia Earle, among others. The film was released on October 1, 2021.

== Featured individuals ==
The following notable individuals were interviewed and featured in the documentary:

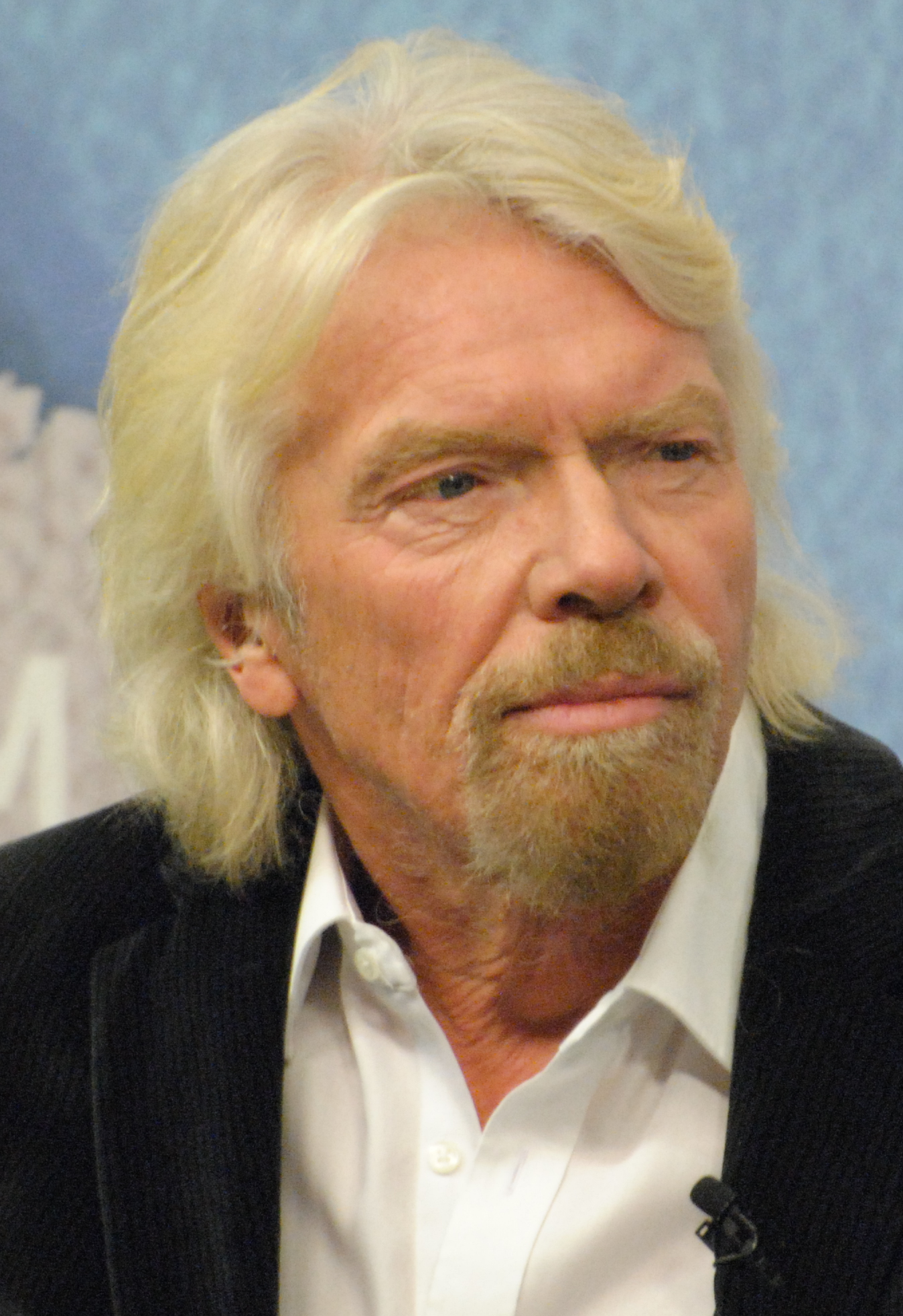
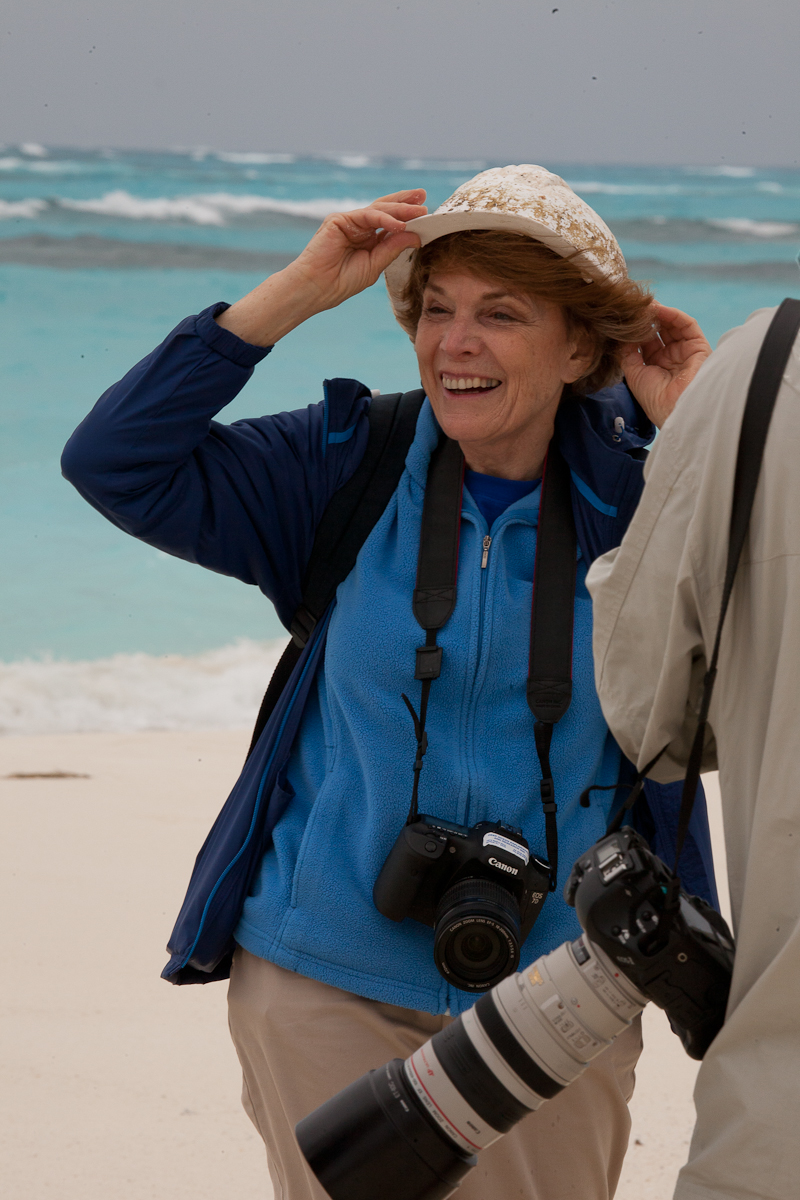
  Richard Branson (pictured in 2015) was interviewed in the documentary alongside Sylvia Earle (pictured in 2012) and others. Branson also served as executive producer.
  Richard Branson, founder and chairman of Virgin Group
- Sylvia Earle, marine biologist
- Bruce Friedrich, founder of The Good Food Institute
- Liv Holmefjord, head of the Norwegian Directorate of Fisheries
- Phil Hogan, European Commissioner for Agriculture and Food
- Tony Robbins, motivational speaker
- Olivier de Schutter, human rights expert
- Jeremy Rifkin, founder and President of Foundation on Economic Trends
- Mauricio Ruiz, founder of the Earth Institute for Environmental Preservation

== Reception ==
Writing for review site Spectrum Culture, author Tejas Yadav calls the film "a tour de force" and writes that "the sheer breadth of topics linked to environmental destruction is impressive," but admits that "at times, the quantity of subjects to cover does feel like a grocery-list of disparate items" and that "the A-list appearances feel misplaced, subtly undermining the messaging of this well-intentioned documentary."

Tomáš Bendl, a PhD candidate at Charles University, recommends the film for teaching to inform students about climate change impacts on a global level.

== Accolades ==
Eating Our Way to Extinction is the winner of the 2022 Environmental Media Award for the best documentary film. It also won the 2022 International Green Film Award of the Cinema for Peace Awards.

The film is estimated to have reached over 10 million viewers across all the viewing platforms.

== See also ==
- List of documentary films
- List of vegan and plant-based media
