= Siddharth Chatterjee =

Indian diplomat

Chief Executive Officer of Global Neighbours
- Incumbent
- Assumed office 2 March 2026

United Nations Resident Coordinator in China
- In office 16 January 2021 – 1 March 2026
- Preceded by: Nicholas Rosellini

United Nations Resident Coordinator in Kenya
- In office August 2016 – January 2021
- Preceded by: Nardos Bekele-Thomas

Personal details
- Education: National Defence Academy; Princeton University
- Occupation: Diplomat, humanitarian and development professional, author

Siddharth Chatterjee is an Indian diplomat, former United Nations official, humanitarian and development professional, and author. He is the Chief Executive Officer of Global Neighbours, a Vienna-based international think tank focused on international dialogue, cooperation and second-track diplomacy. He previously served as United Nations Resident Coordinator in China from 2021 to 2026 and in Kenya from 2016 to 2021.

A former officer of the Indian Army's Special Forces, Chatterjee joined the United Nations in 1996 and held senior positions across humanitarian, development, peace and security operations. His assignments included Bosnia and Herzegovina, Iraq, Somalia, Sudan, South Sudan, Indonesia, Denmark, Switzerland, Kenya and China. He also served the International Federation of Red Cross and Red Crescent Societies in Geneva, Switzerland.

== Early life and education ==
As a child, Chatterjee contracted polio and received care through UNICEF-supported healthcare. He has spoken publicly about surviving the disease. His childhood encounter with UNICEF-supported healthcare also preceded a professional relationship with UNICEF that later become an important part of his humanitarian career.

Chatterjee was admitted to India's National Defence Academy in 1981. During his time at the academy, he was awarded a merit card in boxing and a Blue in horse polo and show jumping. He later earned a master's degree in public policy from Princeton University's School of Public and International Affairs.

== Military service ==
Chatterjee was commissioned into the Indian Army and served in the Parachute Regiment's Special Forces. His battalion was deployed with the Indian Peace Keeping Force in Sri Lanka from 1987 to 1990 during the implementation of the Indo-Sri Lanka Accord. He subsequently served in counter-insurgency operations in northeastern India.

In 1995, he received a gallantry award from the President of India.

== United Nations career ==
Chatterjee joined the United Nations in 1996 and initially served with the United Nations Mission in Bosnia and Herzegovina as a security officer. He subsequently held positions with UNICEF in Sudan, South Sudan, Somalia and Indonesia, working in humanitarian and development operations in conflict-affected settings.

One of the key episodes of his humanitarian career took place in 2001 in South Sudan, where, while working with UNICEF, he led the demobilisation of more than 3,500 child soldiers during an ongoing conflict.

In November 2007, Chatterjee was appointed Chief of Staff of the United Nations Assistance Mission for Iraq (UNAMI), serving under Staffan de Mistura. In 2009, he became Regional Director for the Middle East and Europe at the United Nations Office for Project Services (UNOPS), based in Copenhagen. From 2011 to 2014, he served in Geneva as Chief Diplomat and Head of Strategic Partnerships and Resource Mobilisation at the International Federation of Red Cross and Red Crescent Societies.

=== Kenya ===
Chatterjee served as Representative of the United Nations Population Fund (UNFPA) in Kenya. He promoted partnerships between the public and private sectors to address maternal health and other development priorities.

In August 2016, he was appointed United Nations Resident Coordinator in Kenya. He also served as United Nations Development Programme (UNDP) Resident Representative and coordinated the work of the United Nations system in the country.

He supported the establishment of the SDG Partnership Platform, a public-private mechanism designed to mobilise investment in primary healthcare and the Sustainable Development Goals. He also supported cross-border peace and development initiatives in the Horn of Africa, including cooperation involving Kenya, Ethiopia and Uganda.

=== China ===
On 16 December 2020, United Nations Secretary-General António Guterres appointed Chatterjee as United Nations Resident Coordinator in China. He took office on 16 January 2021 and presented his credentials to President Xi Jinping at the Great Hall of the People in Beijing on 14 April 2021.

As Resident Coordinator, Chatterjee was the most senior representative of the United Nations development system in China and the designated representative of the UN Secretary-General. He led the United Nations Country Team and coordinated its collective development work, including implementation of the United Nations Sustainable Development Cooperation Framework for China in 2021–2025. He subsequently led the UN Country Team’s work, together with the Government of China, in developing the succeeding Cooperation Framework for 2026–2030, which was formally launched in January 2026.

Chatterjee concluded his tenure on 1 March 2026 after approximately three decades of service with the United Nations.

In August 2026, he was appointed Honorary Advisor to UNICEF Hong Kong, extending his long-standing association with UNICEF from his earlier humanitarian career into a new advisory role.

== Global Neighbours ==
In March 2026, Chatterjee became Chief Executive Officer of Global Neighbours, a Vienna-based international think tank that promotes dialogue, cooperation and second-track diplomacy across Europe, Asia and beyond. Its work brings together policymakers, diplomats, academics, business leaders and other stakeholders to address issues including international cooperation, multilateralism, sustainable development and relations between Europe and Asia.

Global Neighbours has also developed Tracks to the Future, its flagship think train initiative connecting Europe, Central Asia and China. The initiative brings together participants from government, academia, business and civil society through a cross-regional journey designed to foster dialogue and exchange on issues including connectivity, technology, sustainable development and international cooperation.

== Academic career ==
On 29 April 2026, Chatterjee was appointed distinguished visiting professor at Tsinghua University's School of Public Policy and Management. He also serves as a Visiting Professor at Schwarzman College, where he teaches on China, global affairs, and global governance.

He has also served as a Professor of Practice in Public Policy and Diplomat-in-Residence at the Hong Kong University of Science and Technology.

Chatterjee also serves as founding co-director of the One Earth Institute, alongside his other work in international cooperation, public policy and sustainable development.

== Writing and public engagement ==
Chatterjee has written and spoken extensively on international development, humanitarian affairs, multilateralism, global governance and international cooperation. His commentary and opinion pieces have appeared in international outlets including Newsweek, CNN, CNBC, the Los Angeles Times and The Guardian, and he has also contributed to Al Jazeera. He has also delivered TEDx talks addressing themes related to leadership, development and public service. Chatterjee has also been recognised by the Rockefeller Foundation as an “Impact Legend.”

He is the author of My Five to Thrive: Practices That Transformed My Body and Mind and Can Transform Yours, a book addressing physical and mental wellbeing and drawing on practices associated with preventive health and lifestyle.

== Personal life ==
Chatterjee has spoken publicly about his family background and childhood, including the experience of his father, who migrated to Kolkata from what is now Bangladesh following the Partition of India.

He is the author of My Five to Thrive: Practices That Transformed My Body and Mind and Can Transform Yours, which draws on his own health transformation and sets out five practices that he has incorporated into his approach to physical and mental wellbeing: breathing, high-intensity interval training, fasting, meditation, and heat and cold exposure. The book presents these practices as a practical framework for improving physical and mental wellbeing.
