= Peter Petrel =

German singer (1940–2026)

- Petrel in 2014
- Born: Peter Sauer; 14 April 1940; Bad Frankenhausen, Gau Thuringia, Germany
- Died: 18 September 2026 (aged 86); Koblenz, Rhineland-Palatinate, Germany
- Occupation: Singer

Peter Petrel (né Sauer; 14 April 1940 – 18 September 2026) was a German singer.

Petrel was best known for forming the group Die Windows alongside Jeanette McKinley and releasing a number-one hit song in Germany in 1972, "How Do You Do".

Petrel died in Koblenz on 18 September 2026, at the age of 86.

== Discography ==
- Peter Petrel and the Dreamland Orchestra (1977)
- Ich bin kein Mann für eine Nacht (1977)
- Himmel, ist das ein Gefühl (1979)
- Jazz & Ähnliches (1979)
- Ich bin viel zu bescheiden (1980)
- Happy Music Every Day (1981)
- Die große Dixie-Sause (1981)
- Die große Hörzu Dixieland-Party (1981)
- Peter Petrel (1983)
- Ein Herz und eine Stimme (1993)
- Dixieland Express (1994)
- Die großen Erfolge (1994)
- Mit Peter Petrel im Stimmungskarussel (1995)
- Dreamland Orchestra Meets Peter Petrel (1997)
- Ich fahr’ so gerne Rad (1997)
- Helden von Gestern (1997)
- Rauchzart (1998)
- I’m in the Mood… Crossover Jazz (1999)
- Schlagerparty mit Peter Petrel (2000)
- Deep in Your Soul (2002)
- Ich will nochmal (2002)
- Norddeutsche Nacht (2003)
- Helden von Gestern (2003)
- Das bin ich (2004)
- Ich will nochmal (2004)
- Hamburger Deern (2005)
- Best of Peter Petrel (2005)
- Kurort St. Pauli (2007)
- Es geht wieder aufwärts - Große Erfolge (2007)
- Jazz We Can (2010)
