= Nuit des Hommes (Nørgård) =

Nuit des hommes is a 1996 chamber opera in two acts by Per Nørgård. The text is compiled from poems by Apollinaire, from which the line "Nuit des hommes seulement" is taken. The opera is for two singers, Alice, a war correspondent (soprano) and Wilhelm, a soldier (tenor).

== Recordings ==
- Nørgård: Nuit des Hommes Helene Gjerris (mezzo-soprano), Helge Rønning (tenor), Andreas Hagman (violin), Bodil Rørbech (violin), Markus Falkbring (viola), Fredrik Lindström (cello), Gert Sørensen (percussion) directed Kaare Hansen. Dacapo OCLC 811255008
