= Adolf Wölfli =

Swiss artist (1864–1930)

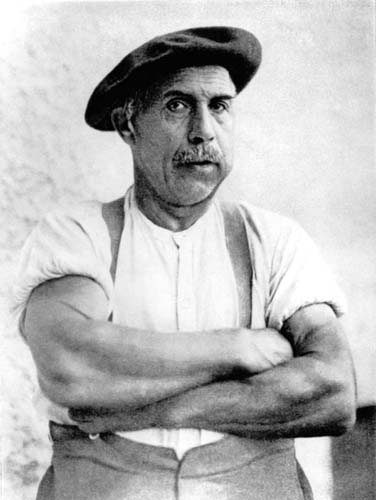
- Born: 29 February 1864; Bowil near Bern, Switzerland
- Died: 6 November 1930 (aged 66); Bern, Switzerland
- Education: Self-taught (Outsider artist)
- Occupation: Visual artist
- Known for: Drawing; painting; experimental music
- Style: Horror vacui
- Movement: Art brut
- Website: adolfwoelfli.ch

Adolf Wölfli (February 29, 1864 – November 6, 1930) was a Swiss schizophrenic visual artist who was one of the first artists to be associated with the Art Brut (i.e. "rough" or "raw") or outsider art label. After being imprisoned for the molestation of a 5-year-old child, and a string of later attempted sexual assaults of children, he was diagnosed with schizophrenia and spent most of his life confined to the Waldau psychiatric clinic in Bern, where he began his art.

His paintings and drawings include texts, numerical calculations, musical notation, and geometric symbols, all of which he meticulously numbered, dated and organized into handmade books consisting of approximately 25,000 pages. His compositions are noted for their detailed structure and organization. His work is largely autobiographical and mythologizes himself in the form of multiple identities including "Saint Adolf Great Great God", a planetary ruler.

== Life ==
=== Childhood ===
Wölfli was born in Bowil in Emmental and, according to his autobiography, was the youngest of seven children born to Jacob Wölfli and Anna Freuz, two of whom died young. In 1864 his family moved to Bern, where he lived until the age of eight. His father was a stonemason and alcoholic who systematically neglected the family and ended up in prison. Due to his mother's illness, they returned in 1872 to the community of Shangnau in Emmental, where they worked on separate farms in exchange for food and lodging. He was abused both physically and sexually as a child, and was orphaned at the age of 10, after his mother died in 1873. He thereafter grew up in a series of state-run foster homes. He worked as a Verdingbub (indentured child laborer) and briefly joined the army. The accounts of his employers and associates differ, but they provide some insight into Wölffli's personality. One colleague described him as a rough and irritable character, often in a bad mood and talking incomprehensibly about the devil, women and other subjects, in such a way that most people thought he was crazy. He rarely agreed with his employers and preferred to give orders himself. In 1882, his unrequited love for a farmer's daughter, due to her family's rejection, was yet another significant loss with a deeply negative psychological impact.

=== Sexual assault of children, imprisonment, and psychiatric hospitalization ===
In 1890 he was arrested and sentenced to two years in prison for molesting a five-year-old girl, following a similar attempt against a fourteen-year-old girl the same year. In his autobiography, he describes in detail the harsh living conditions and experiences he had in prison. In 1895 he was arrested again for the attempted rape of a three-year-old girl. In his confession, Wölfli admitted that he was fully aware of his actions but was unable to explain what had happened to him, claiming that his senses were in complete confusion. Court records show that he had also been accused of another moral misconduct in 1890, for which he was acquitted due to lack of evidence.

On June 3 1895 he was admitted to the Waldau Clinic, a psychiatric hospital in Bern where he would live out the rest of his life. He was very disturbed and too aggressively violent to be left with other patients, therefore he was kept in isolation in a cell. His doctor, Walter Morgenthaler, says in a 1971 documentary that Wölfli tore the ear off one patient and bit a patient's nose. He also soiled himself. He experienced psychosis, which led to intense hallucinations. According to his medical history, his condition improved significantly since 1899, the year in which his painting began.

A New York Times review noted that Wölfli eventually became fearful that his doctors might release him if he seemed fit enough, and he began to claim repeatedly that he was the sickest patient at Waldau. The review also noted that his life fit the pattern of withdrawn artists who have needs taken care of and exhibit a mixture of ego, paranoia, and poor interpersonal skills.

== Visual and written art ==
At some point after his admission to Waldau psychiatric hospital, Wölfli began to draw. His first surviving works (a series of 50 pencil drawings) are dated from between 1904 and 1906.

Walter Morgenthaler, his doctor at the Waldau Clinic, took an interest in Wölfli's art and his condition. Morgenthaler has said that he always had five "strong" male nurses as bodyguards with him when visiting Wölfli's cell, as Wölfli would often be smashing things or banging on the walls, until Morgenthaler started giving him "paper and pencil instead of straitjacket and hypodermic syringe [...], which disarmed him."

Morgenthaler published Ein Geisteskranker als Künstler (A Psychiatric Patient as Artist) in 1921 which was the first in-depth study to present a psychiatric patient as an artist. Morgenthaler's book detailed the works of a patient who seemed to have no previous interest in art and developed his talents and skills independently after being committed for a debilitating condition. The noted writer Julio Cortázar has criticized the reports of Morgenthaler, wrote that his texts "fail to sound intelligent [yet are] full of good will and anecdotes," and characterized the apparent scenario by writing: "[Wölfli ] made life miserable for all God's children until one day it occurred to a psychiatrist to offer this chimpanzee a banana in the form of colored pencils and sheets of paper."

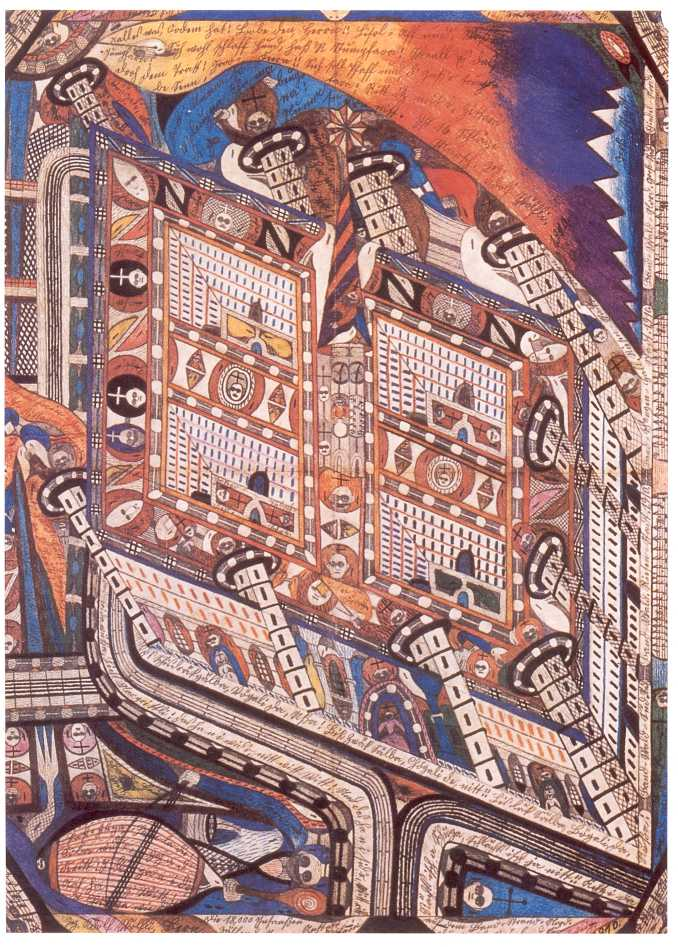
Wölfli's Irren-Anstalt Band-Hain, 1910

Morgenthaler wrote in "An Alienated Artist":

In Wölfli we observe neither a particular and isolated inspiration nor a very distinct cognitive conception or imagination; moreover, his thought, like his method of working, has neither beginning nor end. [...] He begins a new page as soon as one is finished, and without stopping he goes on writing and drawing. If he is asked at the beginning what he plans to draw [...], he will sometimes answer [...] as if he had planned everything out [...], but often he will be unable to tell you, [...] he does not yet know [...], and often he will irritably refuse to answer [...]

— "Un Aliéné Artiste" in L'Art Brut 2

Wölfli often worked with the barest of materials and traded smaller works with visitors to the clinic to obtain pencils, paper or other essentials.

Morgenthaler wrote on Wölfli's materials and methods:

"Every Monday morning Wölfli is given a new pencil and two large sheets of unprinted newsprint. The pencil is used up in two days; then he has to make do with the stubs he has saved or with whatever he can beg off someone else. He often writes with pieces only five to seven millimetres long and even with the broken-off points of lead, which he handles deftly, holding them between his fingernails. He carefully collects packing paper and any other paper he can get from the guards and patients in his area; otherwise he would run out of paper before the next Sunday night. At Christmas the house gives him a box of coloured pencils, which lasts him two or three weeks at the most."

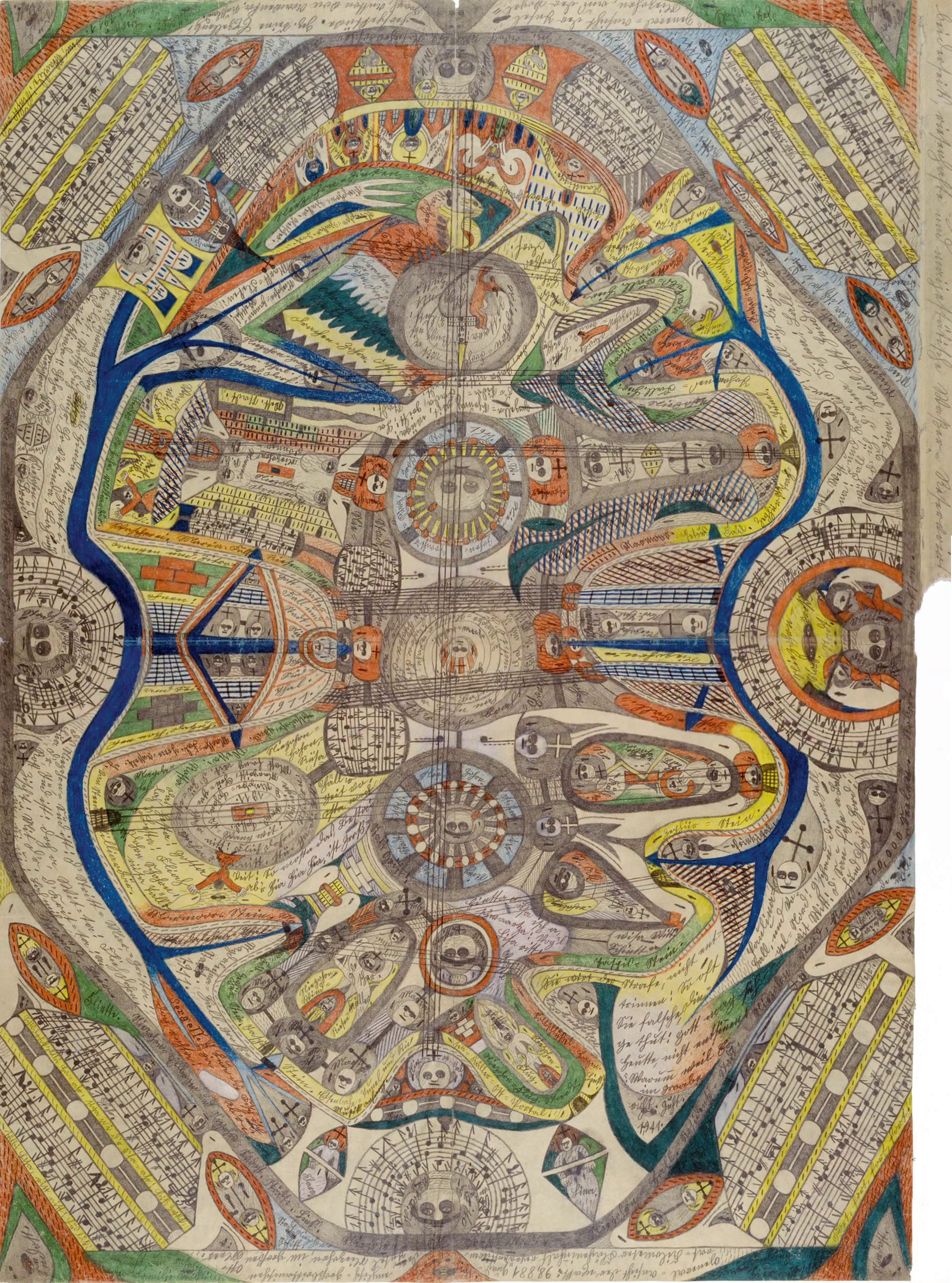
General view of the island Neveranger, 1911

Wölfli produced a huge number of works that were complex, intricate and intense. The images went to the edges of the page with detailed borders. In Morgenthaler's analysis, Wölfli's experienced "horror vacui", which manifested in compulsively filling every empty space with two small holes. Wölfli called the shapes around these holes his "birds". His images also incorporated an idiosyncratic musical notation. (See Music below.) Some of Wolfli's face depictions have been described as Al Jolson blackface by The New York Times.

In 1908, he set about creating a semi-autobiographical epic which eventually stretched to 45 volumes, containing a total of over 25,000 pages and 1,600 illustrations. This work was a mix of elements of his own life blended with fantastical stories of his adventures from which he transformed himself from a child to 'Knight Adolf' to 'Emperor Adolf' and finally to 'St Adolf II'. Text and illustrations formed the narrative, sometimes combining multiple elements on kaleidoscopic pages of music, words and colour. Wölfli simultaneously perceived himself as an intellectual giant and a god and a persecuted child, and referred to himself with different names and signatures including “Cast-Off Accident,” “St. Adolf-Great-Great-God,” “Grim Casualty”, excellency, duke, majesty, emperor, and grand grand emperor. Three or more of his identities often appear on the same drawing.

After Wölfli died at Waldau in 1930, his works were taken to the Museum of the Waldau Clinic in Bern. Later, the Adolf Wölfli Foundation was formed to preserve his art for future generations. Its collection is now on display at the Museum of Fine Arts in Bern.

=== Posthumous analysis and exhibitions ===
After Wölfli's death in 1930, his work was neglected until the mid-1940s when it became part of a general interest in so-called "primitive" art and the Freudian theory of the subconscious. In December 1965, works by Wölffli were included in the Eleventh International Surrealist Exhibition in Paris, and in the preface to the exhibition catalogue, Andre Breton described Wölffli's entire oeuvre as one of the three or four most important creations of the 20th century. Wölfli's international recognition came with the fifth documenta exhibition held in Kassel, Germany, in 1972. The exhibition featured not only his drawings but also his writings, as well as a reconstruction of his cell in the Waldau asylum.

The Guardian in 2006 characterized Wölfli as having "spent 40 years in a cell illuminating the fictitious tales of Saint Adolf in manuscript."

A 1988 NY Times review wrote that the "relentlessly self-absorbed [...] sheer megalomania of this work" was alien in its extremeness, though it set a high standard "for any art." The reviewer noted that the obsessiveness of Wolfli's crowded, repeating patterns "leaves the viewer very little spatial ground to stand on."

Eric Gelber at Art Critical wrote in a review that the human figures were unskilled and "the only way to differentiate between his male and female figures is to look for the dress and high heels." The review noted that the "heads are round as marbles, have penis-like noses and raccoon eyes." Gelber also judged that "his approach to color often does not go beyond coloring book techniques." On the writing in particular, Gelber wrote, "I don’t think every utterance from a mentally ill person is profound. Wölfli ’s writing definitely reveals his obsessions and fantasies in raw form, but not much else is communicated."

Will Howard at Dangerous Minds identified Wölfli as the starting point of a general fascination with mentally ill artists and questioned the morality of certain kinds of media coverage of Wölfli. Howard stated that Wölfli’s situation has deepened people's understanding and also led to the exploitation of people who are a danger to themselves and others. Howard posed to the reader the question of whether it was worth it.

== Music ==
The musical notation in his visual art seemed to start as a purely decorative affair but later developed into real composition which Wölfli would play on a paper trumpet, i.e. a piece of paper he had rolled up. Compared to his painting and writing, Wölfli's musical compositions attracted less interest from musicians and composers. Excerpts from the 11th Geographic Notebook were transcribed by the Swiss musicologists Peter Streiff and Kjell Keller in 1976 and recorded two years later for a trio and two narrators on the album Wölfli. Gelesen und getont.

The Adolf Wölfli Foundation claims on their website:

Naturally enough, the question whether Wölfli's music can be played is asked again and again. The answer is yes, with some difficulty. Parts of the musical manuscripts of 1913 were analyzed in 1976 by Kjell Keller and Peter Streif and were performed. These are dances – as Wölfli indicates – waltzes, mazurkas, and polkas similar in their melody to folk music. How Wölfli acquired his knowledge of music and its signs and terms is not clear. He heard singing in the village church. Perhaps he himself sang along. There he could see song books from the eighteenth century with six-line staffs (explaining, perhaps, his continuous use of six lines in his musical notations). At festivities he heard dance music, and on military occasions he heard the marches he loved so well. More important than the concrete evaluation of his music notations is Wölfli's concept of viewing and designing his whole oeuvre as a big musical composition. The basic element underlying his compositions and his whole oeuvre is rhythm. Rhythm pervades not only his music but his poems and prose, and there is also a distinctive rhythmic flow in his handwriting.

In 1978, "Adolf Wölfli: Gelesen Und Vertont", the first recording of Wölfli's work ever to be published, was released by the Adolf Wölfli Foundation, Museum of Fine Arts, Bern. Since that time, a number of German musicians have released adaptations of Wölfli's work. A comprehensive list of these artists can be found at The Adolph Wölfli Foundation's music page.

In 1987, musician and composer Graeme Revell released an LP entitled Necropolis, Amphibians & Reptiles: The Music of Adolf Wolfli on his own Musique Brut label in London, UK. This audio compilation was based on the works of Wölfli and incorporated digital renditions of Wölfli's compositions, with additional sound effects and ambient soundscapes added to the songs, by Revell, based on the artwork surrounding Wölfli's musical notations. The LP was a collection of musical interpretations by Revell as well as DDAA, & Nurse With Wound. This LP came with a booklet with a biography and images of Wolfli's works. Tracks 8 and 9 are combined into one track. This record was later re-released as The Musique Brut Collection on CD by the Grey Area record label, a sub-label of UK-based Mute Records, under the parent label EMI. This audio compilation also includes the other Musique Brut LP release The Insect Musicians. The CD release also contains a small booklet containing pictures of Wölfli's artwork, information about his history, and a brief write-up on Revell's process of converting Wölfli's lithographs into songs.

=== Influence in music ===
Wölfli's work has inspired many composers. Danish composer Per Nørgård, after viewing a Wölfli exhibition in 1979, embarked on a schizoid style lasting for several years; among the works of this time are an opera on the life of Wölfli called The Divine Circus. The chamber opera Wölfli Szenen (Wölfli Scenes), which premiered in Graz, Austria, in 1981, featured music by Georg Friedrich Haas, the Austrian composer of spectral music, Gösta Neuwirth, Anton Prestele and Wolfgang Rihm.

In 1992, Terry Riley composed and performed a two-hour opera entitled The Saint Adolf Ring based on Wölfli's life.

In 2010, Baudouin De Jaer released a record entitled The Heavenly Ladder with compositions by Wölfli.

== Gallery ==
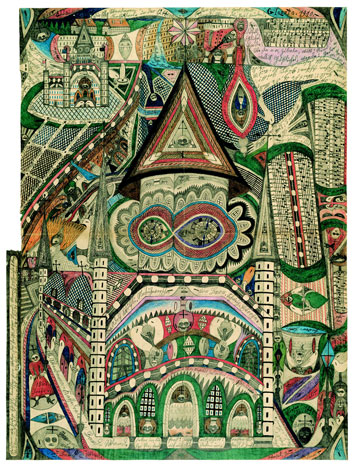
Die Skt-Wandanna-Kathedrale in Band-Wand, 1910.

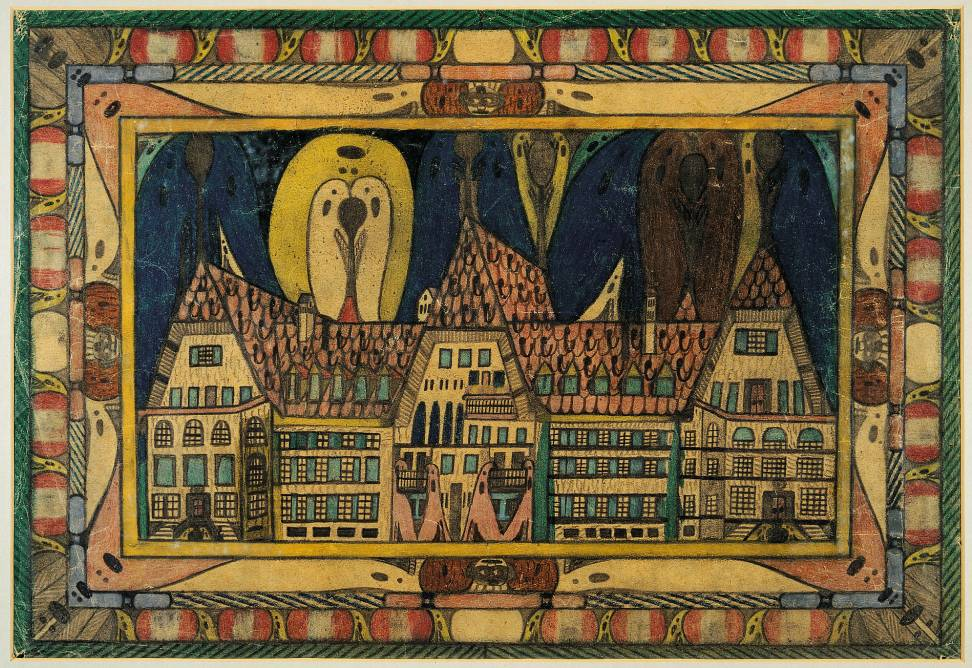
Heilanstalt Waldau, 1921.

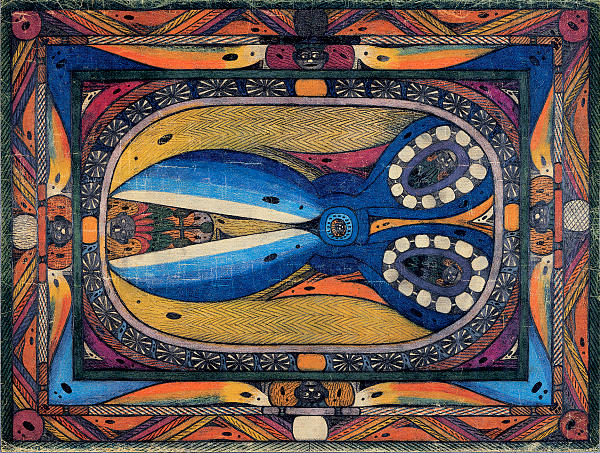
Schähren Hall, 1926.

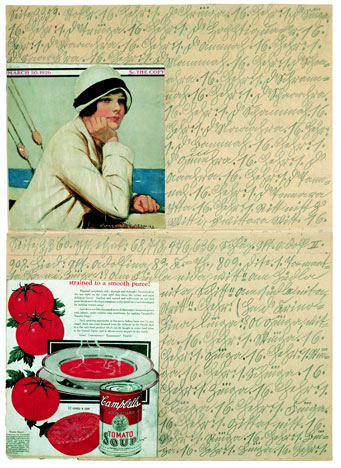
Campbell's Tomato Soup, 1929.

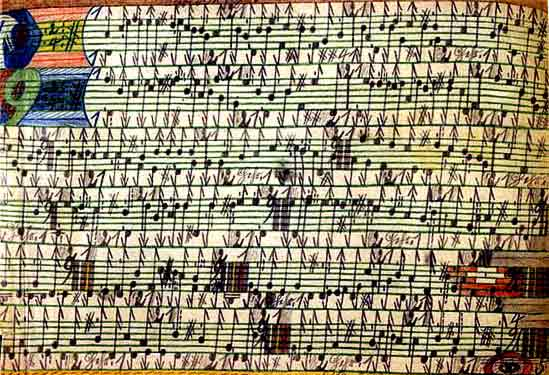
Musiknotation, 1930

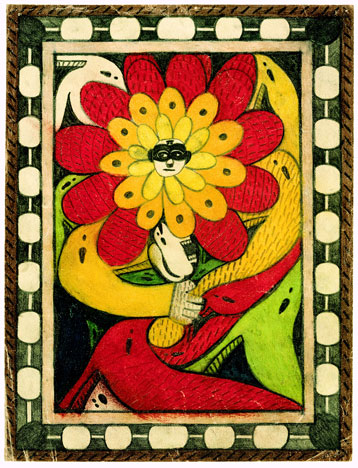
Skt-Adolf-Thron -Flühe-Blume.

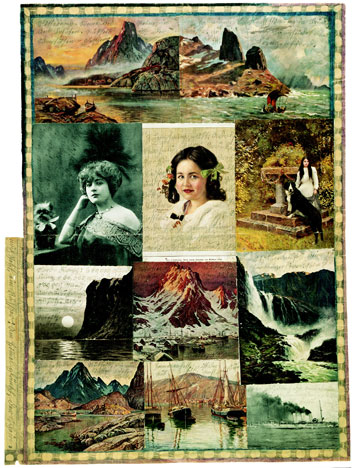
Zungsang-Skt.-Adolf-Roosali 1917.

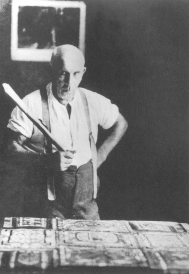
Adolf Wölfli 1925.

== See also ==
- Outsider art
- Fractal art

Other outsider artists

- List of outsider artists
- Henry Darger, an outsider artist who independently arrived at his own illustrated semi-autobiographical epic many thousands of pages in length.
- Mark Beyer, a comics artist whose work manifests a similar horror vacui.
- Joseph Cornell
