= Gilgamesh (Nørgård opera) =

- Opera by Per Nørgård
- Librettist: Per Nørgård
- Based on: Epic of Gilgamesh
- Premiere: 4 May 1973; Aarhus

Gilgamesh is an opera composed in 1972 by Per Nørgård who also wrote the libretto based on the Babylonian Epic of Gilgamesh. The opera is subtitled Opera in Six Days and Seven Nights, indicating that it is not a traditional opera. It was first performed by the Jutland Opera in Aarhus on 4 May 1973. It received the 1974 Nordic Council Music Prize.

== History ==
Nørgård created Gilgamesh on a commission of the Musikdramatiska Skolan of Stockholm, supported by the Nordisk Musikfond (NOMUS), and completed it in 1972. He based it on the Babylonian Epic of Gilgamesh, one of the earliest epic texts in history. The libretto mostly follows the sequence of events in the poetry, with some speeches directly quoted. Nørgård divided it into six days and seven nights, beginning with the creation of the world involving gods, demons, animals and humans, and ending with the rebirth of Gilgamesh.

For a performance, the audience is placed on the two long sides of a rectangular room, while musicians and singers perform in the centre, all of them in costumes. A conductor, identified with the Sun God, is moving in a cyclic orbit among the performers between a northern and a southern desk.

The opera was first performed in Århus on 4 May 1973 by the Jutland Opera in Århus. It received the Nordic Council Music Prize in 1974.

== Recording ==
Gilgamesh was recorded in 1973 by the Swedish Radio, with as a Tamas Veto conducting the Swedish Radio Choir and Orchestra. It was combined with the composer's 1968 Voyage into the Golden Screen, with Oliver Knussen conducting the Danish National Symphony Orchestra, as Dacapo DCCD 9001. OCLC 1120926549
