= Deutsches Theater (Munich) =

Coordinates: 48°08′13″N 11°33′45″E

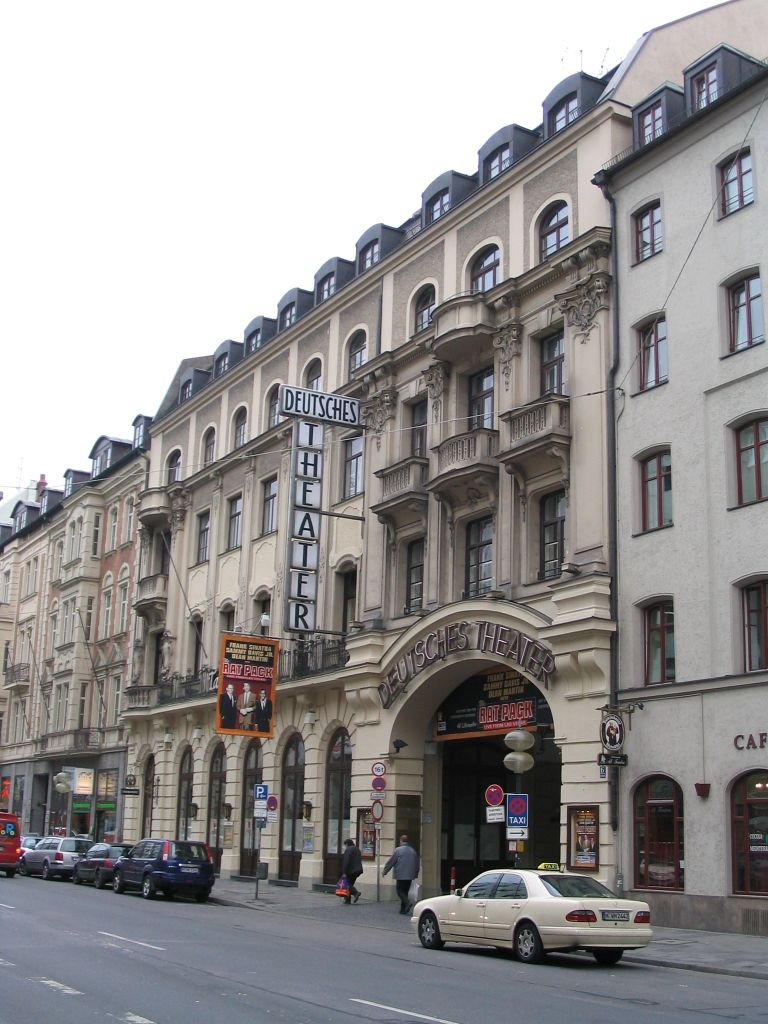
Deutsches Theater

Deutsches Theater München ("German Theatre") is a theatre in Munich, Bavaria, Germany. It is Germany's largest theater for guest performances. In the theater especially musicals are staged. Also in the carnival season, the theater plays an important role as big balls and parties are catered there.

== History ==
The Deutsches Theater in Munich in Schwanthalerstraße 13 was opened in September 1896. The program includes musicals, operettas, ballets and concerts with international entertainers of the performing arts entertainment.

In 1896 Alexander Blum, Joseph Rank and Karl Stohr built the theatre in the style of the (neo) baroque, which was also called "fairy palace". The complex contained, besides an auditorium with 1679 seats and the smaller auditorium "Silver Hall", restaurants, cafe, shops and 30 apartments.

The theater was originally used primarily for vaudeville events, but also for popular comedies, folk plays, sporting events and carnival balls. In 1918 also the workers' and soldiers' councils of the Munich Soviet Republic met in the auditorium.

Under the direction of Hans Gruß who led the theatre from 1918, and in addition to the appearance of Tiller Girls, Karl Valentin and others, also Josephine Baker gave a performance in the theatre but was however banned in 1929. Under the Nazi regime Gruß was replaced by Paul Wolz in 1935. In 1939, the auditorium was redesigned by Paul Baumgarten Elder. On 9 March 1943, the theatre was destroyed by bombs.

In 1951, the Deutsches Theater was re-opened, as it had been partially rebuilt in 1949 to 1951. Since the 1960s, the variety of performances was extended also to classic drama, ballet, operetta and musical. From 1976 to 1982 the interior of the theater was redesigned by Reinhard Riemerschmid in the style of pop art. In 1982 the International Company of the Broadway Musical played a very successful engagement at the Deutsches Theater.

After the theater was threatened with closure in 2003, the municipal council determined to leave the theatre in municipal possession and accomplish the necessary restoration work at the building.

=== Restoration ===
After determining to accomplish the necessary restoration work at the building, the municipal council also concluded that the theatre would not be closed as it was for the restoration 1977–1982. The theatre was situated in a theatre-marquee in Fröttmaning near the Allianz Arena. The restoration works started in June 2008 and were due to be finished in November 2011. But in 2009 work was delayed because of the discovery of disruptions in the metro tube below the theatre. Further complications on site shifted the deadline for the grand opening. The relocation to Schwanthalerstraße is - in accordance with current state of knowledge – dated on July 17, 2013, the grand opening will be celebrated in fall/winter 2013.
