= Siddharth Nagarajan =

Indian drummer and musician

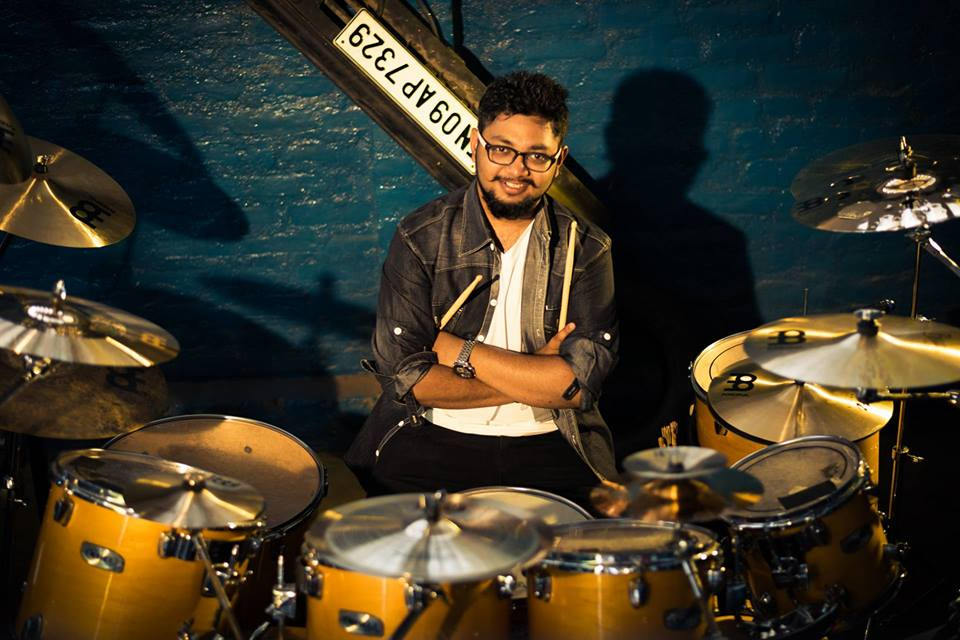
- Born: 25 September 1997 (age 29)
- Occupation: Drummer /Musician
- Years active: 1999-present
- Parent(s): Nagi, Vidya
- Website: drumsiddharth.com

Siddharth Nagarajan (born 25 September 1997) is a drummer from India. His debut public show was at the age of 2, on 16 April 2000, which earned a place in the Limca Book of Records as the youngest drummer of India. Siddharth Nagarajan completed his high schooling in Jubilee Hills Public School, Hyderabad.

At age 8 National Geographic selected Siddharth Nagarajan as one of seven geniuses for the show My Brilliant Brain. They declared Siddharth was declared an inborn genius.

== Invitations ==
Siddharth was called as a guest speaker at TED-X in Amrita University Coimbatore, India. He gave his guest percussion performance at Anokha 2011 in Amrita Vishwa Vidyapeetham. His talk was well received by critics. Siddharth was invited by former President of India Bharat Ratna A.P.J. Abdul Kalam during the latter's birthday celebrations.

== Records ==
Siddharth holds the following records:

- Guinness World Record in Most drumbeats in a minute using drumsticks--a total of 2,109 beats
- Most notes in a minute with 2,164 using a multi-stroke roll in 2015
- Youngest drummer (Limca Book of records, 2003)
