= Danish jazz =

History of jazz music in Denmark

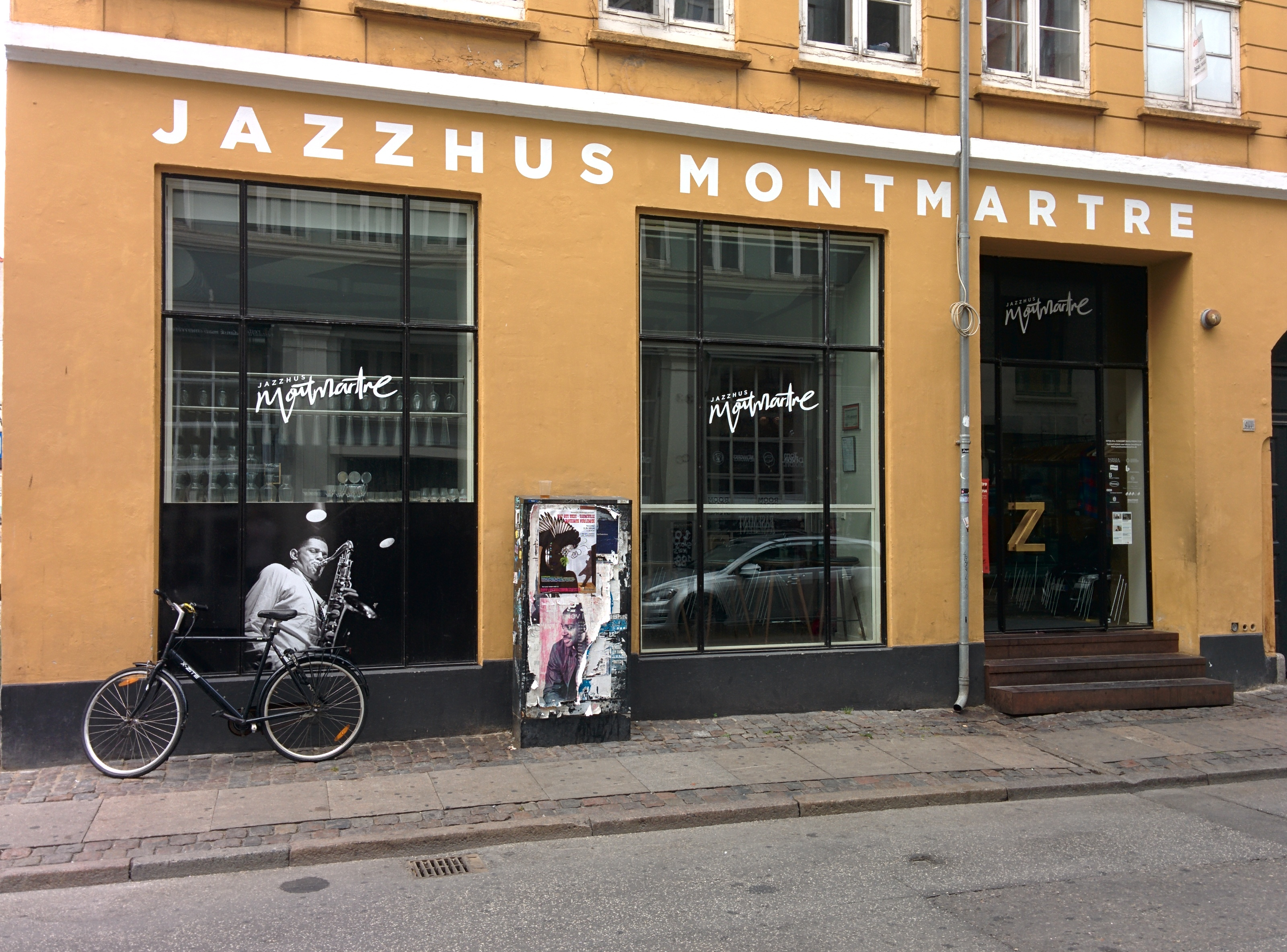
Jazzhus Montmartre in Copenhagen

Danish jazz dates back to 1923 when Valdemar Eiberg formed a jazz orchestra and recorded what are thought to be the first Danish jazz records in August 1924 ("I've Got a Cross-Eyed Papa" and "In Bluebird Land"). However, jazz in Denmark is typically first dated to 1925, when bandleader Sam Wooding toured in Copenhagen with an orchestra. This was the first time most Danes had heard jazz music. Some prominent early Danish jazz musicians include Erik Tuxen who formed a jazz band and was later named conductor of the Danish Radio Symphony Orchestra; Bernhard Christensen, an art music composer who incorporated jazz elements into his pieces, and Sven Møller Kristensen, who was the lyricist for many of Bernhard Christensen's pieces and who wrote a book on jazz theory in Danish.

== History ==
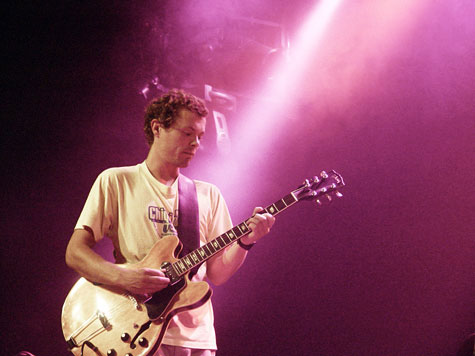
Jakob Bro

In the 1930s, jazz became quite popular in Denmark; major figures of the period include pianist Leo Mathisen, violinist Svend Asmussen, trombonist Peter Rasmussen, saxophonist Kai Ewans, bassist Niels Foss, and pianist/vibraphonist Kjeld Bonfils. Many of these musicians played in Valdemar Eiberg's band.

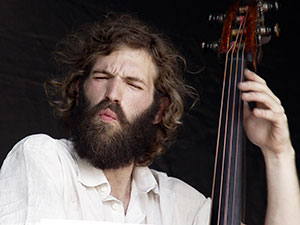
Jonas Westergaard

Jazz went underground in 1940 as a result of the Nazi occupation of Denmark when jazz was discouraged by the regime. Nevertheless, it continued to be performed and recorded, even more so as Danish musicians began to fill the void created by the lack of foreign players touring through the area. Musicians such as Eiberg, Bonfils and Asmussen (who played in a band together), along with Uffe Baadh, Bruno Henriksen and Bertel Skjoldborg continued to make jazz music as a form of political protest. Many singers, such as Freddy Albeck, Ingelise Rune, and Raquel Rastenni, found it necessary to escape to Sweden in the later years of the occupation.

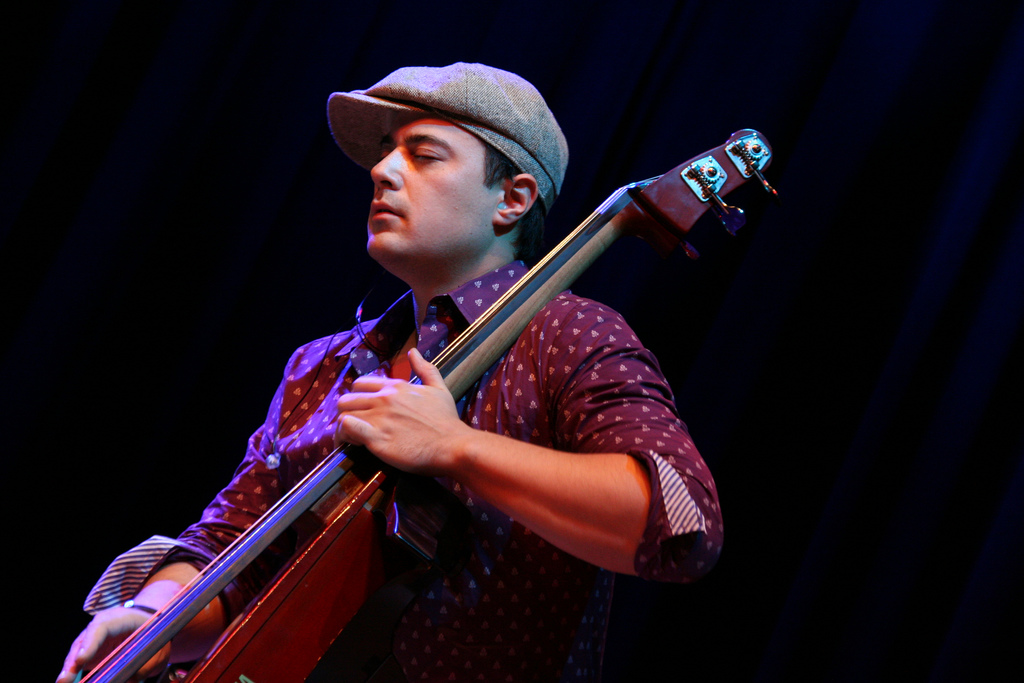
Chris Minh Doky (2008)

Following World War II, Danish jazz musicians began to split into an older guard, which maintained the style of traditional New Orleans jazz, and newer musicians who favored the bebop style of Charlie Parker and Dizzy Gillespie that was emerging in America. The former were represented by musicians such as pianist Adrian Bentzon, trombonist Papa Bue, and trumpeter Theis Jensen, while the latter included saxophonist Max Brüel, bassist Erik Moseholm, drummer Uffe Baadh and trumpeter Jørgen Ryg.

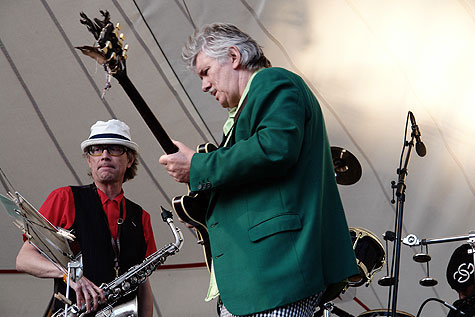
Pierre Dørge and T. S. Høeg Copenhagen Jazz Festival

In the early 1960s, a club called the Jazzhus Montmartre opened in Copenhagen, which was intended to recreate the atmosphere of jazz clubs in Paris and New York City. It became a major venue for both Danish and American jazz musicians. Many American jazz players moved to Copenhagen from the 1950s when Stan Getz and Oscar Pettiford moved there. They were followed by Dexter Gordon, Kenny Drew, and Ben Webster in the 1960s, and Duke Jordan, Horace Parlan, Ed Thigpen, Bob Rockwell, and Thad Jones (who became the leader of the DR Big Band in 1977) in subsequent decades. Kenny Drew formed a trio with Alex Riel and Niels-Henning Ørsted Pedersen which became a staple at Jazzhus Montmartre.

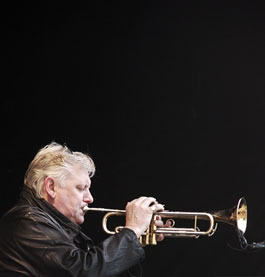
Palle Mikkelborg in Aarhus

In the 1960s, Danish musicians began to explore free jazz with saxophonist John Tchicai as the most prominent proponent. In parallel, a more mainstream wing evolved, including saxophonist Jesper Thilo.

As rock music became more popular in the 1970s, jazz's popularity waned, but it continues to be supported in venues such as the Copenhagen Jazzhouse and the annual Copenhagen Jazz Festival. The organization JazzDanmark, funded by the Danish government, works to promote jazz in Denmark and Danish jazz abroad.

== Musicians ==
=== Danish jazz musicians ===
- Thomas Agergaard, saxophonist
- Jacob Anderskov, pianist, composer, bandleader
- Svend Asmussen, violinist
- Søren Bebe, pianist
- Nikolaj Benson
- Thomas Blachman, drummer and composer
- Jesper Bodilsen bassist
- Jakob Bro, guitarist
- Jakob Høyer, drummer
- Papa Bue, trombonist and bandleader
- Christina von Bülow, saxophonist
- Anders Christensen bassist
- Thomas Clausen, pianist
- Carsten Dahl, pianist
- Christina Dahl, saxophonist
- Nils Bo Davidsen, bassist
- Jakob Dinesen, saxophonist
- Chris Minh Doky, bassist
- Niels Lan Doky, pianist
- Pierre Dørge, guitarist, bandleader and composer
- Sinne Eeg vocalist
- Jørgen Emborg, pianist and composer
- Mikkel Ploug, guitarist
- Jacob Fischer, guitarist
- Lennart Ginman, bassist and composer
- Ib Glindemann, bandleader
- Lasse Gustavsen, saxophonist
- Ole Kock Hansen, pianist
- Bent Jædig, saxophonist
- Jan Kaspersen, pianist, bandleader
- Benjamin Koppel, saxophonist
- Søren Kjærgaard, pianist, composer, bandleader
- Erling Kroner, trombonist
- Morten Lund, drummer
- Jesper Lundgaard bassist
- Fredrik Lundin, saxophonist
- Mads Mathias, vocalist
- Leo Mathisen, pianist
- Marilyn Mazur, percussionist
- Palle Mikkelborg, trumpeter and composer
- Erik Moseholm, bassist, bandleader and composer
- Nicolai Munch-Hansen, bassist
- Lars Møller, saxophonist
- Cæcilie Norby, vocalist
- Kresten Osgood, drummer
- Thomas Ovesen
- Stefan Pasborg, drummer
- Niels-Henning Ørsted Pedersen, bassist
- Hugo Rasmussen, bassist
- Simon Spang-Hanssen, saxophonist
- Ole Sterndorff, banjoista
- Niels Jørgen Steen, pianist, bandleader and composer
- Bo Stief bassist
- John Tchicai, saxophonist
- Jesper Thilo, saxophonist
- Simon Toldam, pianist, composer, bandleader
- Kasper Tranberg, trompetist
- Hans Ulrik, saxophonist
- Mads Vinding, bassist
- Jonas Westergaard, bassist
- Jens Winther, trompetist, composer, bandleader
- Jesper Zeuthen, saxophonist
- Katrine Madsen, vocalist

=== Bands ===
- DR Big Band
- Klüvers Big Band
- Papa Bue's Viking Jazz Band
- Ernie Wilkins Almost Big Band
- StoRMChaser
- Mames Babegenush

=== American expatriates ===
- Stan Getz, saxophone (1958 – 1961)
- Oscar Pettiford, double bass, cello (1958 – to his death in 1960)
- Kenny Drew, piano (1961 – his death in 1993)
- Dexter Gordon, saxophone (1962 – 1976)
- Ben Webster, saxophone (1964 – his death in 1973)
- Stuff Smith, violin (1965 – his death in 1967)
- Richard B. Boone, trombone (1970 – his death in 1999)
- Horace Parlan, piano (1972 – his death 2017)
- Ed Thigpen, drums (1974 – his death in 2010)
- Thad Jones, trumpet (1978 – 1984)
- Duke Jordan, piano (1978 – his death in 2006)
- Ernie Wilkins, saxophone (1979 – his death in 1999)
- Bob Rockwell, saxophone (1983 – present)
- Bobby Ricketts, saxophone (1981 – present)
- Doug Raney, guitar (1977 – his death in 2016)

== Venues ==
- Jazzhus Montmartre, Copenhagen – Official website
- Copenhagen JazzHouse
- Paradise Jazz, 14 Magstræde, Copenhagen – Danish Jazz Venue of the Year 2010
- La Fontaine, Copenhagen
- Atlas, Aarhus – Official website

== See also ==
- Music of Denmark
- Copenhagen Jazz Festival
- Aarhus Jazz Festival

== Literature ==
- Olav Harsløf, et.al.: "Jazz i Danmark - 1950-2010" Politikens Forlag (2006). ISBN 9788756795654 (in Danish)
- Christopher Washburne: "Jazz Re‐Bordered: Cultural Policy in Danish Jazz" in Jazz Perspectives (Volume 4, Issue 2, p. 121-155, 2010)
