= Music of Denmark =

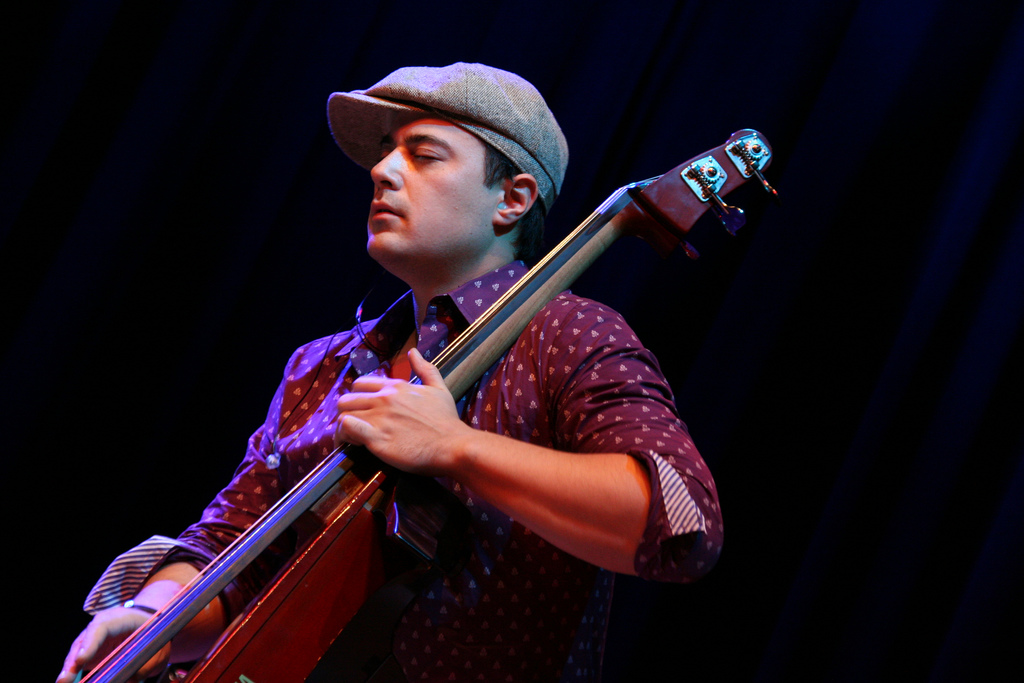
Danish jazz musician Chris Minh Doky in a live performance.

The origins of Danish music can be traced back to the Bronze Age. Horns or lurs have been discovered in various parts of Scandinavia, mostly in the region now known as Denmark, since the end of the 18th century. Denmark's most famous classical composer is Carl Nielsen, especially remembered for his six symphonies, while the Royal Danish Ballet specializes in the work of Danish choreographer August Bournonville. Danes have distinguished themselves as jazz musicians, and the Copenhagen Jazz Festival has acquired an international reputation. The modern pop and rock scene has produced a few names of note, including MØ, Dizzy Mizz Lizzy, Lukas Graham, D-A-D, Tina Dico, Aqua, The Raveonettes, Michael Learns to Rock, Volbeat, Alphabeat, Safri Duo, Medina, Oh Land, Kashmir, King Diamond, Outlandish, and Mew. Lars Ulrich is the first Danish musician to be inducted into the Rock and Roll Hall of Fame.

== Origins ==
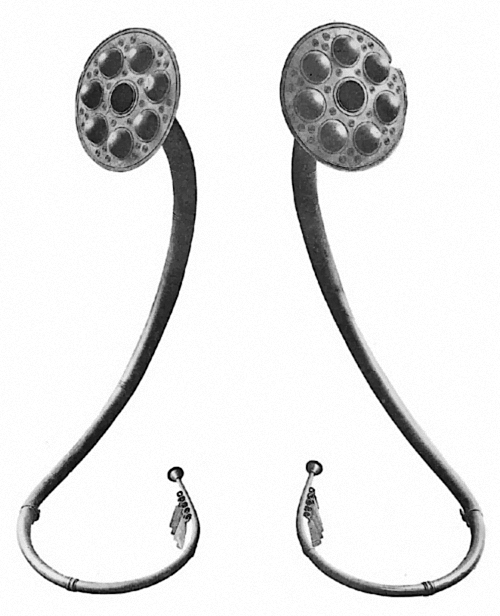
The Brudevælte Lurs from northern Zealand

The earliest traces of Danish music go back to the many twisting Bronze-Age horns or lurs which some experts have identified as musical instruments. They have been discovered in various parts of Scandinavia, mostly Denmark, since the end of the 18th century.

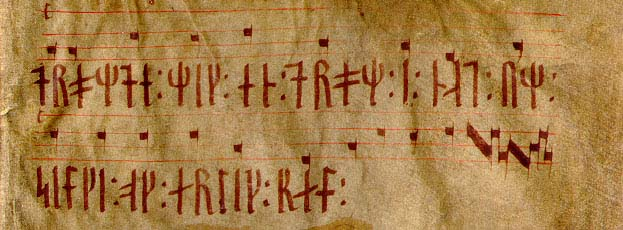
Codex Runicus: Denmark's oldest musical notation

In his Gesta Danorum (c.1200), historian Saxo Grammaticus refers to the power that music had over King Erik the Kind-Hearted. In the 13th and early 14th centuries, German minnesingers such as Tannhäuser and Frauenlob sang in the Danish courts. The Codex Runicus (c.1300) contains a verse written in runes with a non-rhythmic musical notation. The first line is Drømdæ mik æn drøm i nat (I Dreamed Me a Dream Last Night). There is also evidence that English monks came to Denmark to sing at a celebration commemorating St Canute, who died in 1086. In 1145, Lund Cathedral received Scandinavia's first choir statues, and by 1330 it was one of the larger churches to have an organ installed.

== Historical influences ==
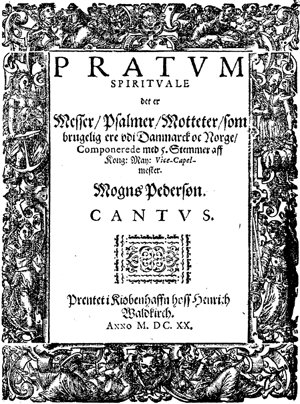
Pratum Spirituale by Mogens Pedersøn (1620)

The greatest influence on the evolution of music in Denmark has certainly been the monarchy. At the time of his coronation in 1448, Christian I engaged a permanent corps of trumpeters, and by 1519 the court had a corps of court singers and an instrumental ensemble as well. The collections of works used by the chapel royal under Christian III in the middle of the 16th century were based on Dutch, Italian, French and German masters. Christian IV spent considerable sums of money on training local musicians and bringing foreign masters to Denmark. Mogens Pedersøn, one of his Danish musicians who had studied in Venice under Giovanni Gabrieli, became one of Denmark's most important composers of church music. His principal work Pratum spirituale was a collection of 21 Danish hymns in five-part settings, a mass in five parts, three Latin motets and a number of Danish and Latin choral responses. It was published in Copenhagen in 1620 and is still performed today.

Under the influence of Louis XIV of France, music for the theatre was established in Denmark during the reigns of Frederik III and Christian V when lavish court ballets were performed. This soon led to opera and the performance of Der vereinigte Götterstreit composed by Povl Christian Schindler on Christian's birthday in 1689. Although it was a great success, there was little interest in opera after the theatre caught fire a few days later causing 180 deaths.

In 1569, shortly after the Reformation, Denmark's first hymn book, Thomesens Salmebog, was published with music for the individual hymns.

Dieterich Buxtehude (c. 1637–1707) was a Danish composer and organist, a highly regarded composer of the Baroque period. His organ works comprise a central part of the standard organ repertoire and are frequently performed at recitals and church services. But he is most remembered for his vocal compositions.

== Classical music ==
=== Opera, song and concerts ===
Frederik IV opened a new opera house in Copenhagen in 1703, the first performance being an opera by the Italian Bartolomeo Bernardi. Reinhard Keiser, the prolific opera composer from Hamburg, presented his works in Copenhagen from 1721 to 1723. In 1748 Den Danske Skueplads (the Danish Theatre) moved into a new building and in 1779 Det Kongelige Kapel (the Royal Danish Orchestra) became a permanent attachment.

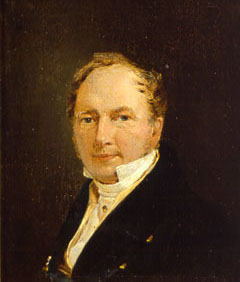
Christoph Weyse: Song composer

Pietro Mingotti, from Venice, who had formed an opera company was invited to Copenhagen by Queen Louise in 1747. His members included Christoph Willibald Gluck and Giuseppe Sarti. In 1756, Sarti provided the music for the first syngespil which, in the early 1790s, became established as a popular national genre with Høstgildet (the Harvest Celebration) and Peters Bryllup (Peter's Wedding). Both were composed by Johann Abraham Peter Schulz. Johann Hartmann is remembered for his two operas on texts by Johannes Ewald in which he helped creating a national musical style. The first of these, Balders Død, builds on the old Nordic mythology and uses dark colours when depicting the old Gods and Valkyries. The second, Fiskerne, describes contemporary fishermen's lives, and uses melodies inspired by the Scandinavian folk style.

Christoph Ernst Friedrich Weyse, from Altona, who was a pupil of Schulz, is remembered above all for his Danish songs, hymns and carols, which remain popular to this day. But he also composed religious music, piano pieces, and symphonies.

Friedrich Kuhlau wrote Elverhøj (Elves' Hill) (1828), which contains the music for Kong Kristian stod ved højen mast, a Danish national anthem. Elverhøj is considered to be the first Danish national play and has been performed in Denmark more than any other play. Kuhlau was also a pianist who brought Beethoven's piano music to Denmark.

Schulz and Kunzen both gained importance as a result of their influence as chief conductors at the Royal Theatre. They brought the best of European music to Danish audiences. Weyse and Kuhlau contributed not only to orchestral and chamber music, but also to the popular repertory, Weyse with secular and religious songs and Kuhlau with chamber music suitable for amateur musicians.

Another successful composer and conductor in the mid-20th century was Emil Reesen (1887–1964), who is remembered above all for his highly successful operetta Farinelli (1942), which is still popular today.

Opera has continued to figure prominently on the Danish music scene, thanks in part to the Copenhagen Opera House, which was opened in the year 2005. Although the majority of performances cover the works of the well-known European composers, Danish operas are also included from time to time. In 2010, with the involvement of the ambitious young artistic director Kasper Bech Holten, there were performances of Poul Ruders' new work Kafka's Trial, while in recent years works by both John Frandsen and Bent Sørensen have been part of the repertoire as well.

=== The Golden Age ===
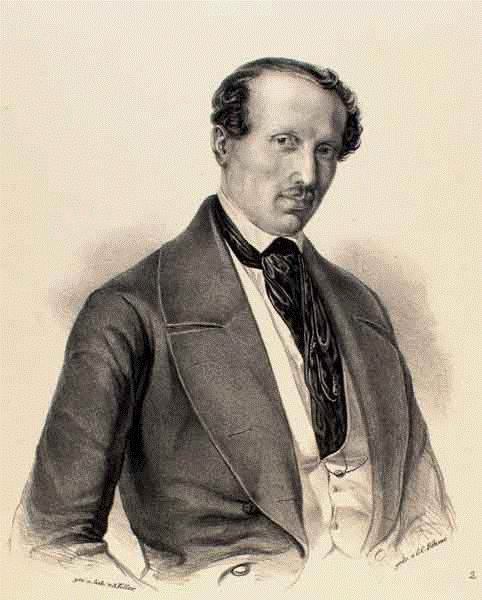
Hans Christian Lumbye (1810–1874)

The 19th century saw the emergence of a number of Danish composers inspired by Romantic nationalism. Johan Peter Emilius Hartmann (1805–1900), apart from opera and ballet music, contributed to song and the piano repertory. From 1843 until his death, he was the organist at the Church of Our Lady. His works are not only romantic but often inspired by the old Nordic legends. According to Alfred Einstein, it was he who really founded Danish romanticism, if not Scandinavian romanticism altogether. His works had a great influence on the next generation of composers such as Edvard Grieg and Carl Nielsen.

Hans Christian Lumbye (1810–1874) was employed as the first music director at the Copenhagen amusement park Tivoli when it opened in 1843. Here he had a platform for presenting a large foreign and Danish repertory, including his many waltzes and galops. In 1839, he had heard a Viennese orchestra play music by Johann Strauss, after which he composed in the same style, eventually earning the nickname "The Strauss of the North". One of his most popular pieces, associated with Tivoli, is Champagnegaloppen (the Champagne Galop), which starts with the happy sound of a champagne cork popping. It has been used in several Danish films including Reptilicus (1961), and Champagnegaloppen (1938).

Niels W. Gade (1817–1890) participated in the development of Musikforeningen (the Music Society) which had been founded in 1836 with the purpose of extending and improving the understanding of classical music. He became its conductor in 1850, and under his management a number of masterpieces of choral music were given their first performance in Denmark, among them Bach's St. Matthew Passion in 1875.

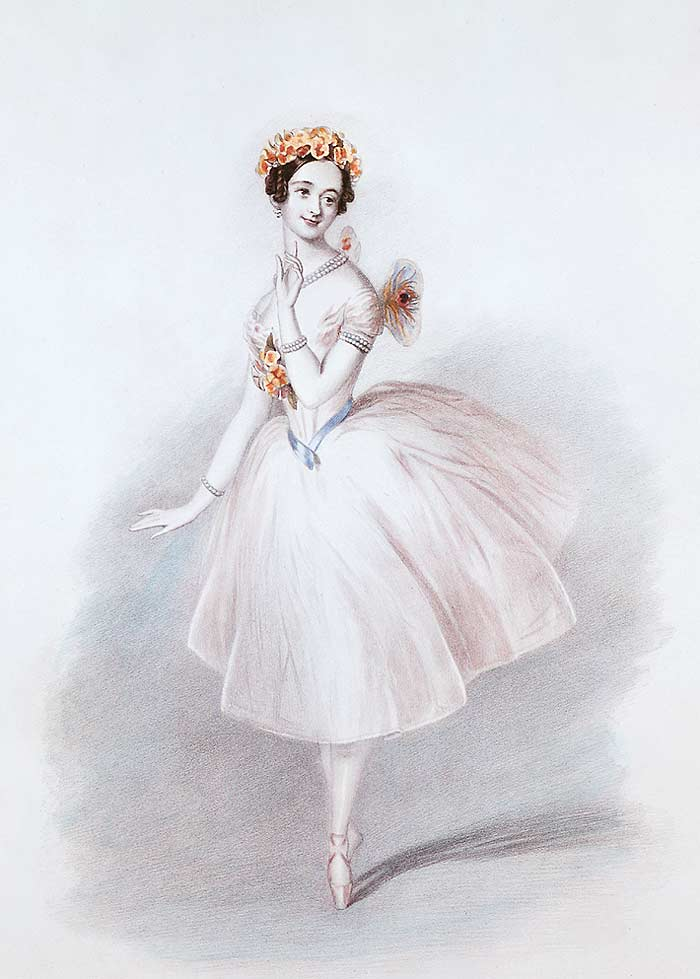
Marie Taglioni in Bournonville's La Sylphide

At the conservatory in Copenhagen he helped teach future generations, including Edvard Grieg and Carl Nielsen. In the spirit of Romantic nationalism, he composed eight symphonies, a violin concerto, chamber music, organ and piano pieces and a number of large-scale cantatas, among them Elverskud (The Elf King's Daughter), the most famous Danish work of its kind.

Many other composers were part of this "Golden Age" of Danish music, among which Peter Heise, Emil Hartmann, August Winding, C.F.E. Horneman or Asger Hamerik.

Another major contributor to the Golden Age was August Bournonville (1805–1879), the renowned ballet master and choreographer. From 1830 to 1877, he was the choreographer at the Royal Danish Ballet, for which he created more than 50 ballets admired for their exuberance, lightness, and beauty. He created a style which, although influenced by the Paris ballet, is entirely his own. Bournonville's best-known works are La Sylphide (1836), Napoli (1842), Le Conservatoire (1849), The Kermesse in Bruges (1851) and A Folk Tale (1854). He drew on a number of different composers including Johan Peter Emilius Hartmann, Holger Simon Paulli and Niels Gade. The ballets are widely performed today, not only in Denmark but worldwide, especially in the United States.

=== The Carl Nielsen era ===
As a result of problems with Germany, Denmark's attitude during the first half of the 20th century became nationalistic and introverted. The two leading figures, Carl Nielsen and Thomas Laub revived interest in the purer music of earlier periods such as the Renaissance.

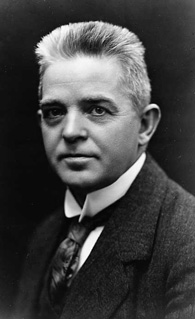
Carl Nielsen (1865–1931)

- Carl Nielsen (1865–1931), now an internationally recognized composer, was the dominant figure in Danish music and musical life from the end of the 1890s until well into the 20th century. He had grown up in a small village on Funen but, by performing with folk musicians as a child and as a bugler in the army, he was able to enter the music conservatory in Copenhagen in 1884. By the time he took over Gade's role around 1900, Denmark's music scene was firmly established with strong popular interest and support. Nielsen's orchestral music, including six symphonies and concertos for flute, violin, and clarinet, is widely performed. Indeed, the success of his First Symphony when it was played in Berlin in 1896 paved the way for his growing reputation. The Third Symphony (1912), which contains wordless vocal solos, was performed in the Netherlands, Germany, Sweden and Finland within the first two years. The Fourth Symphony (1916) featuring a battle between two sets of timpani is the one which has been most widely recorded. Maskarade (1906), a three-act opera based on the play by Ludwig Holberg, is regarded as the Danish national opera. Nielsen also composed the opera Saul og David (1901) which offers marvellous chorus scenes. Another important choral work is the cantata Hymnus amoris (1896), a beautiful composition for choir and orchestra. He is also remembered for the incidental music he wrote for Adam Oehlenschläger's play Aladdin as well as for the songs he set to music, many of which are still popular in Denmark.
- Thomas Laub (1852–1927), an organist, was devoted to reintroducing the old Protestant hymn tunes which had been forgotten or altered over the years. He published a number of important works including Kirkemelodier (Church Melodies) (1890), Udvalg af Salme-Melodier i Kirkestil (Selected Hymn Tunes in the Church Style) (1896 and 1902), Dansk Kirkesang (Danish Church Song) (1918) and Musik og Kirke (Music and Church) (1920). Laub also wrote folk song music and together with Carl Nielsen published En Snes danske Viser (A Set of Danish Folk Songs) (1917).
- Rued Langgaard (1893–1952), a late-Romantic composer, was not fully recognized until 16 years after his death. He was inspired by his conviction that music had a spiritual power and was therefore important for mankind. He was a prolific composer, completing over 400 works representing over 50 hours of music. His Symphony No. 1 Klippepastoraler (Rock Pastorals) is in the late-romantic style, reminiscent of Anton Bruckner while Symphony No. 10 Din Torden-Bolig (Your Dwelling of Thunder) is also majestic, but more in the style of Richard Strauss

=== Contemporary composers ===
In addition to those specialising in rock, folk and electronic music, Denmark has a number of contemporary composers who have been successful in writing classical music covering a variety of genres. Among the most successful are:

- Niels Viggo Bentzon (1919-2000) who wrote in a largely neoclassical style 24 symphonies, 16 string quartets, 31 piano sonatas, operas and many more works.
- Per Nørgård (1932–2025) has composed works in all major genres: six operas including Gilgamesh, two ballets, eight symphonies including a choral symphony, and other pieces for orchestra, several concertos, choral and vocal works, an enormous number of chamber works, ten string quartets and several solo instrumental works. The conductor Sergiu Celibidache once precisely expressed the potential of Nørgård's large-scale, faultless creation: "Only the mind of a new time in the new millennium will be able to understand the scope of Nørgård’s music."
- Anders Koppel (born 1947) has had an extremely versatile career in rock, classical and world music. He has composed the music for eight ballets with the Danish Dance Theatre, 50 theatrical plays and for more than 100 movies.

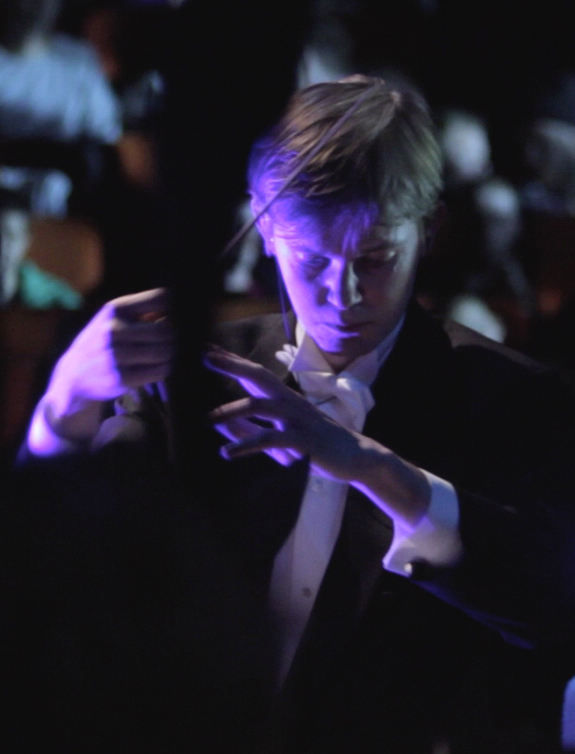
Frederik Magle

- Poul Ruders (born 1949) is known internationally for the music he has written for choir, chamber ensemble, and solo instruments, which are frequently performed outside Denmark. It is however is orchestral music, especially his symphonies and concertos, which is most appreciated in Denmark.
- Hans Abrahamsen (born 1952) is one of the most notable contemporary composers whose works have evolved from his initial New Simplicity style leading to his internationally successful Nacht und Trompeten.

Other notable contemporary composers include Bent Sørensen, and Pelle Gudmundsen-Holmgreen (both winners of the Nordic Council Music Prize), and Frederik Magle (compositions for the Danish royal family).

=== Light Classical ===
One of the most universally known pieces of Danish music is the Jalousie 'Tango Tzigane' (1925) composed by Jacob Gade. It has been used in countless films, such as the classic Danish sex comedy I Tvillingernes tegn (1975), where it is the centerpiece of a big nude dancing production number set in the 1930s, and Sally Potter's The Man Who Cried (2000), with Johnny Depp playing a gypsy in the 1920s.

A special position is occupied by Bent Fabricius-Bjerre (b. 1924), who has written music for Danish films and television series such as Matador in his highly individual style. The signature tune Alley Cat quickly won international success in the same class as Gade's tango.

== Jazz, rock and popular music ==
=== Jazz ===
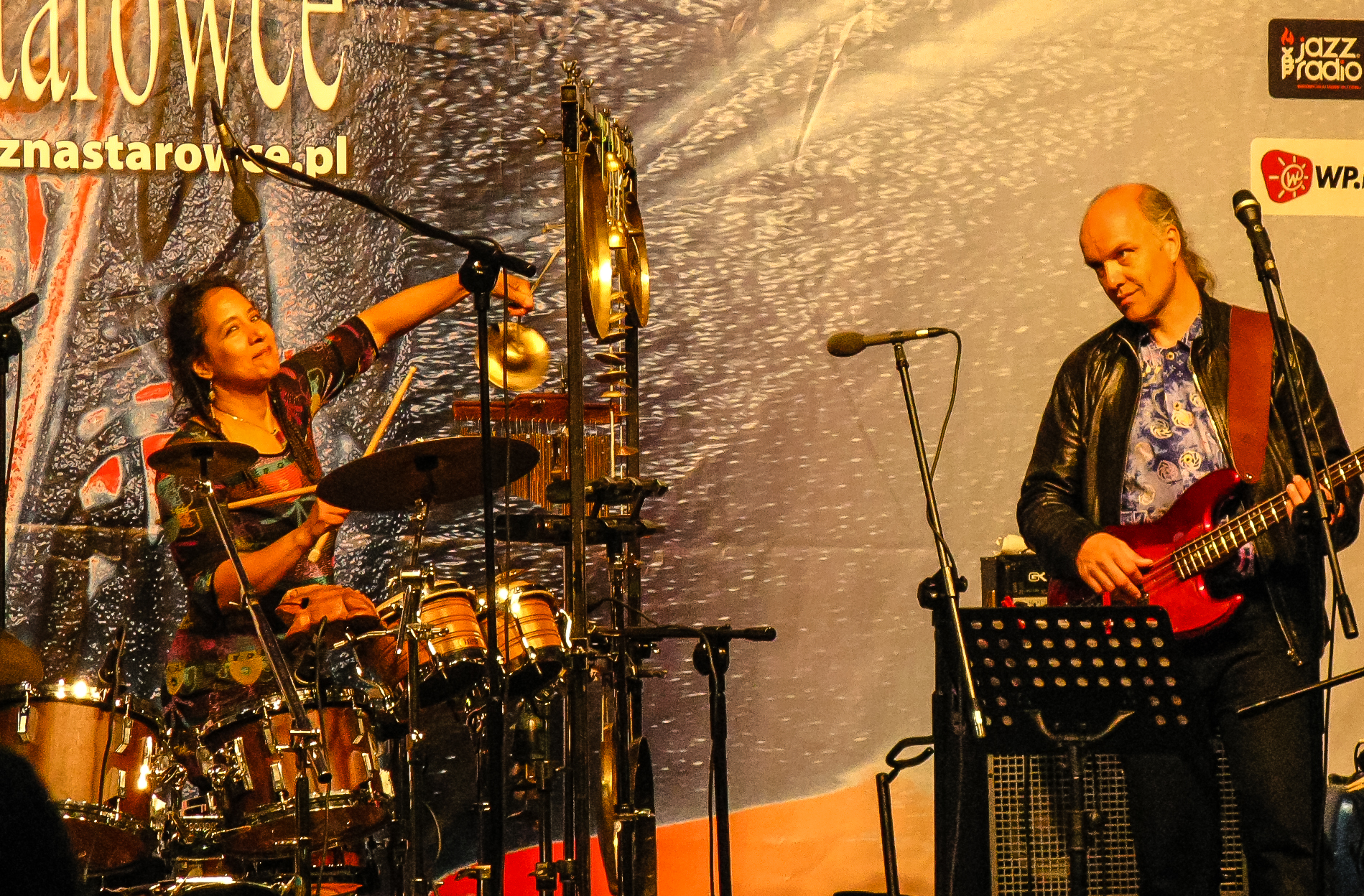
The Marilyn Mazur Group playing in Warsaw in 2008

Jazz has been one of Denmark's most important musical developments over the past century. Its origins can be traced to Valdemar Eiberg's band in 1923 and their recordings the following year. But it was in 1925, when Sam Wooding brought his orchestra to Copenhagen that the Danish music scene was properly introduced to the genre. Early Danish jazz was influenced by three classically trained musicians: Erik Tuxen (1902–1957), who created one of the country's first jazz bands, Bernhard Christensen (1906–2004), a composer of both jazz and classical music, and Sven Møller Kristensen (1909–1991) who wrote lyrics for Christensen as well as a number of books about jazz.

As jazz became more popular in the 1930s, one of the rising stars was the talented violinist Svend Asmussen (1916–2017) who made his first recordings in 1934 at the age of 18 and was still playing with his quartet more than 70 years later.

During the German occupation in the 1940s, jazz was discouraged but many musicians continued to perform while others escaped to Sweden, including drummer Uffe Baadh. Indeed, the period became known as "The Golden Age of Jazz" as the number of concerts in hotels and restaurants increased and the number of recordings rose from about 180 in 1935–1939 to over 650 from 1940 to 1945.

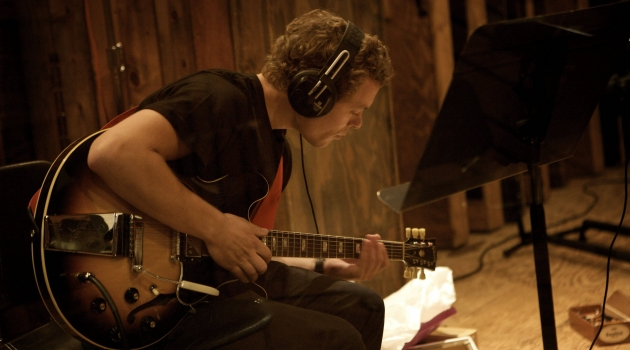
Jakob Bro

Following World War II, Danish jazz musicians began to split into an older guard, which maintained the style of older New Orleans jazz, and newer musicians who favored the bebop style of Charlie Parker and Dizzy Gillespie that was then emerging in America. The former were represented by musicians such as pianist Adrian Bentzon, trombonist Papa Bue, and trumpeter Theis Jensen, while the latter included saxophonist Max Brüel, bassist Erik Moseholm, and trumpeter Jørgen Ryg.

In the early 1960s, when there was something of a revival, the Jazzhus Montmartre opened in Copenhagen, reflecting the atmosphere of clubs in Paris and New York City. It soon became a major venue for both Danish and American artists. Many Americans moved to Denmark including Stan Getz, Dexter Gordon, Ben Webster, Lee Konitz and many others. The American pianist Kenny Drew formed a trio with drummer Alex Riel and bassist Niels-Henning Ørsted Pedersen which became a staple at Jazzhus Montmartre. Danish musicians also began to explore free jazz in the 1960s with saxophonist John Tchicai the most prominent proponent. In parallel, a more mainstream wing evolved, including saxophonist Jesper Thilo.

As rock music became more popular in the 1970s, jazz's popularity waned, but it continues to be supported in venues such as the Copenhagen Jazzhouse, Denmark and the Jazz Club Loco, as well as at the annual Copenhagen Jazz Festival. Danish jazz musicians continue to find unity in diversity, exploring a wide range of feelings and genres and bringing new strength to contemporary jazz as it unfolds in all its shapes and sizes. Prominent jazz musicians today include Carsten Dahl, Jørgen Emborg, Thomas Clausen, Fredrik Lundin, Marilyn Mazur, Mads Vinding, Ib Glindemann, Jakob Bro, Chris Minh Doky and his brother Niels Lan Doky.

The organization JazzDanmark, funded by the Danish government, works to promote jazz in Denmark and Danish jazz abroad.

=== Rock ===
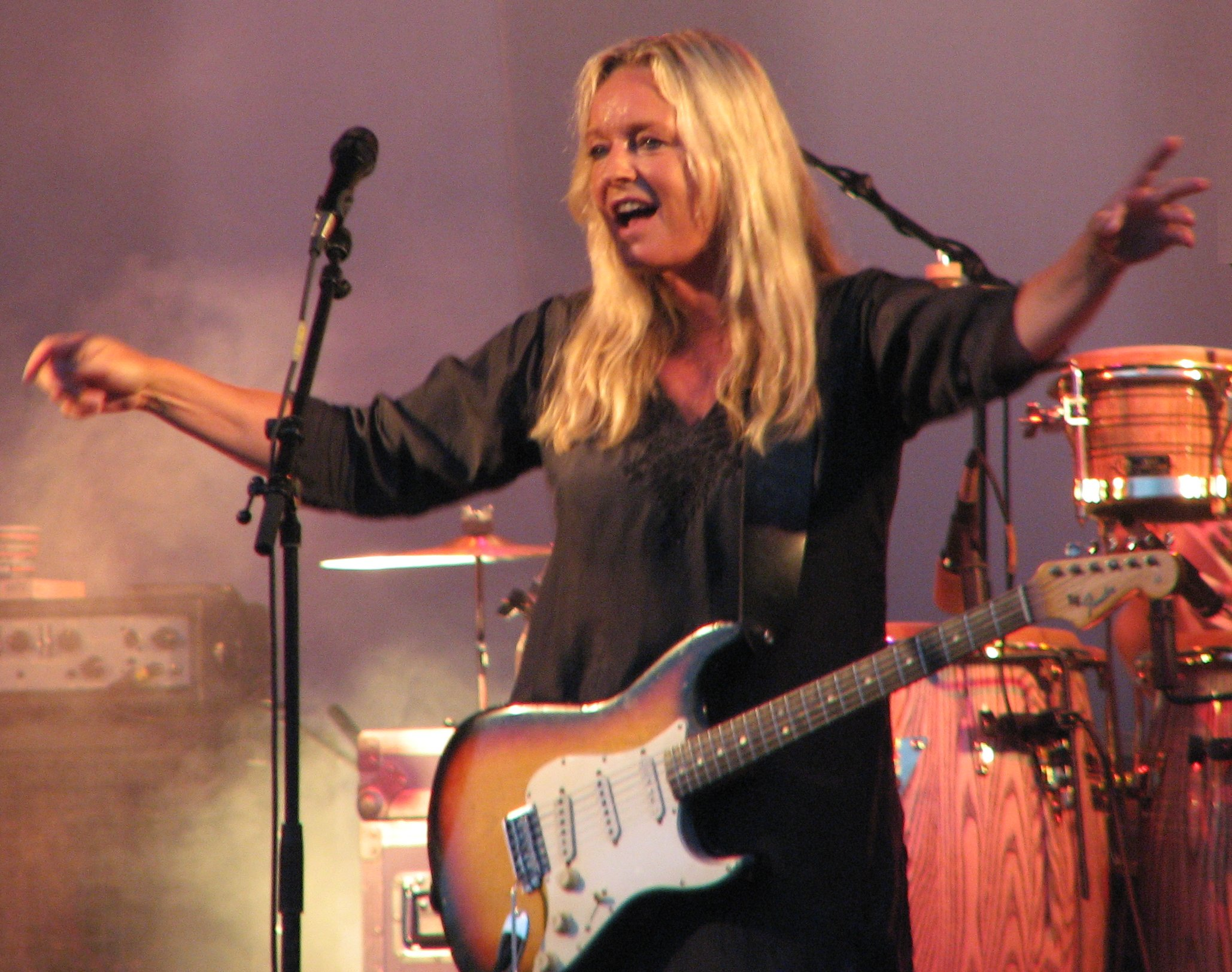
Anne Linnet at a concert in Odense, 2006

In the early days of rock and beat, some Danish artists quickly adapted this new type of music with success. Bands like Peter og Ulvene, Sir Henry and his Butlers, The Beefeaters and later on Steppeulvene (the Steppenwolves), Alrune Rod and Savage Rose were among the popular bands in Denmark throughout the 1960s and early 1970s. Still, Danish rock and pop music in those days resembled more of German schlager than American or British rock.

The Danish rock scene thrived in the 1970s when groups drew on trends in the United States and Britain. Many consider their style to be Danish although this seems mainly to be due to the language of the songs and the way they fit into the national agenda. The most successful have been Gasolin', Shu-Bi-Dua, Sebastian, Anne Linnet, Gnags, TV-2, and more recently Magtens Korridorer. Kim Larsen who had played with Gasolin' went on to become a very successful solo artist in his own right while Sebastian has composed a number of successful musicals for theatre and film. The versatile Anne Linnet is still popular in Denmark today.

Until fairly recently, few Danish rock groups had been successful outside Denmark. An exception was D-A-D (formerly Disneyland After Dark) who had a hit with Sleeping My Day Away in the early 1990s. Today, however, with the Music Export Denmark initiative, several rock bands are doing increasingly well internationally. These include Mew, Iceage, Volbeat, Kashmir, The Raveonettes, and Blue Van.

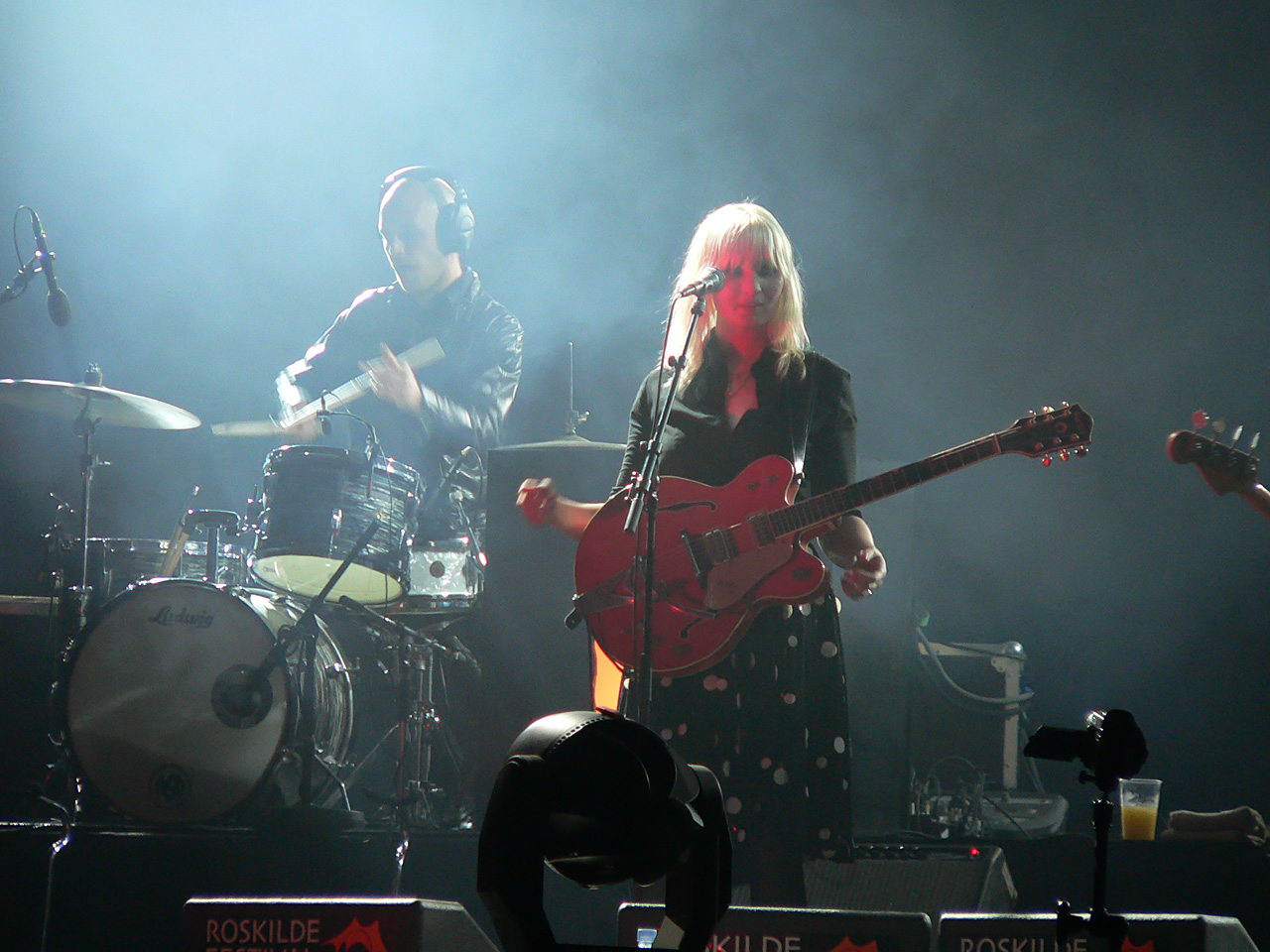
The Raveonettes, Roskilde Festival, 2005

Other rock artists worth mentioning are The Kissaway Trail, Junior Senior, Nephew, Carpark North, Saybia, VETO, Swan Lee, Dúné, Volbeat and Dizzy Mizz Lizzy which has just had a revival.

Famous Danish rock and metal musicians include Lars Ulrich, the drummer and co-founder of Metallica, Mike Tramp, the vocalist and co-songwriter of White Lion, and Kim Bendix Petersen, aka King Diamond, vocalist of Danish heavy metal band Mercyful Fate and the eponymous King Diamond.

The annual Roskilde Festival is held in Danish city of Roskilde. The festival is the second-largest in Europe with ticket sales normally running from 70,000 to 100,000. The festival has featured many prominent artists (mainly rock), such as Nirvana, Guns N' Roses, Slipknot, Kings of Leon, U2, Bob Dylan, Black Sabbath and Green Day, and there has also been an emphasis on world music, alternative genres and Danish music at the festival. In 2000, the festival suffered a terrible accident during a Pearl Jam concert where nine people were crushed by the wild crowds, making security a primary issue of the following festivals. The festival has suffered no further incidents of the kind.

=== Pop ===
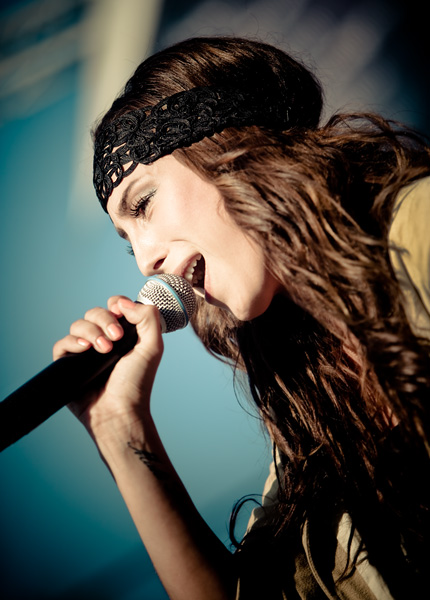
Medina – one of the most successful Danish artists.

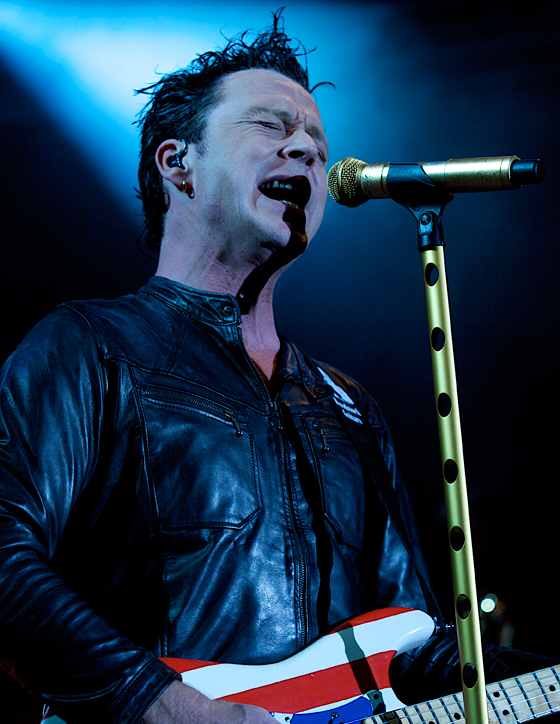
Thomas Helmig performing in Aalborg, 2009

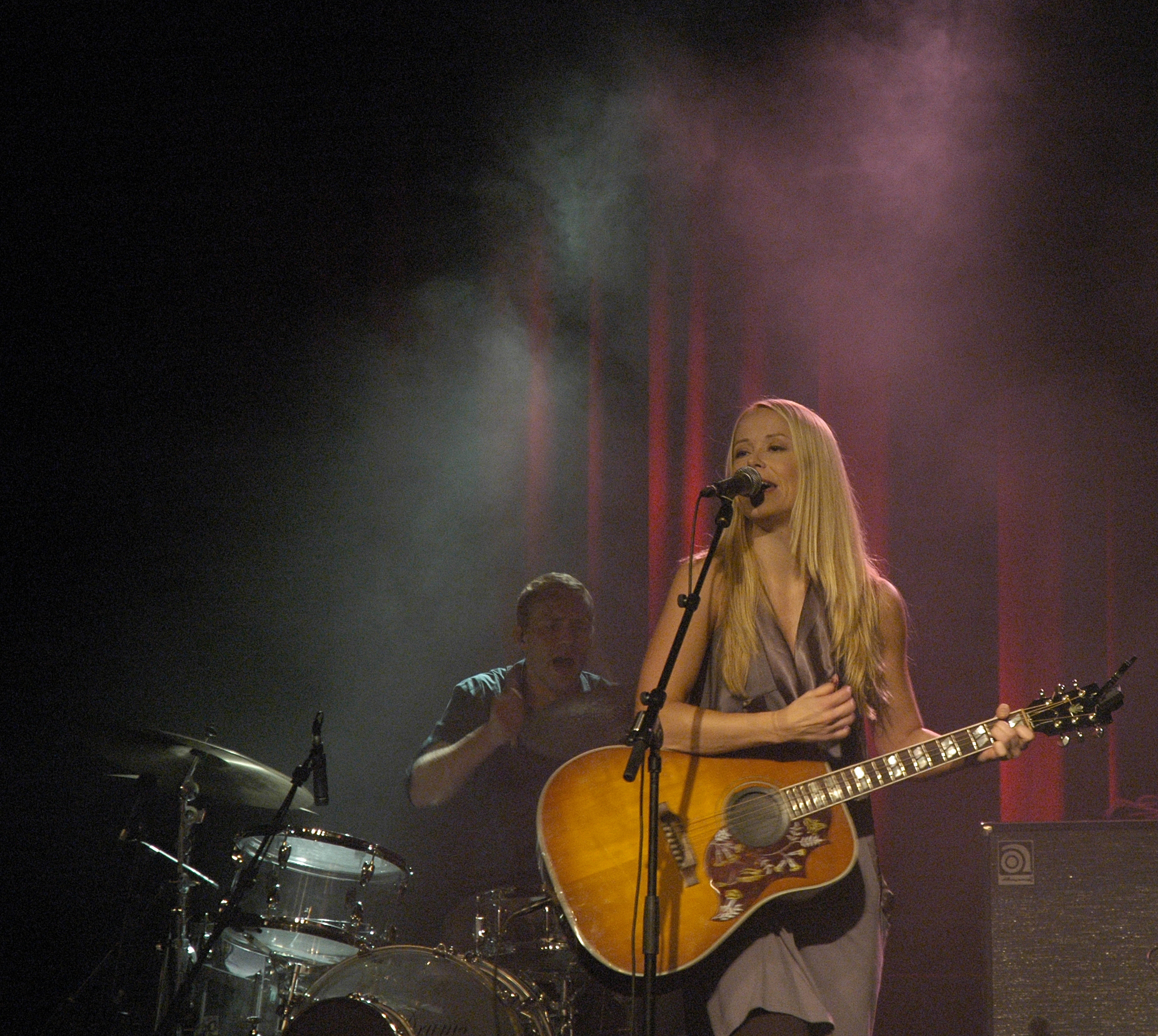
Tina Dico in concert in Det Musiske Hus in Frederikshavn in February 2008

As with rock music, the Danish pop scene has recently benefitted from the Music Export Denmark initiative.

- Thomas Helmig is one of the most popular Danish pop artists who has won awards at the Danish Music Awards (DMA) eight times.
- Tina Dico is a Danish singer-songwriter who has won several prizes including awards at the Danish Music Awards in 2004 and 2006. Her most famous songs are "Welcome Back Colour", "Count To Ten", "Copenhagen", "Warm Sand", "Nobody's Man", "Sacre Coeur", "Open Wide", "On The Run" and "Moon To Let". She is also very popular in the UK when she collaborated with the band Zero 7 in 2003 with whom she also made the popular song "Home". Tina is also known as the owner of her own record label called Finest Gramophone.
- Medina is currently one of the most successful artists of this country and she is known in most European countries, US and Mexico. She sings both in Danish and English. She has made about ten singles in the top 2 of Denmark. Most famous is the song Kun for Mig ("Only for me"), other popular songs are Ensom, Vi to, For altid, Velkommen Til Medina, Synd For Dig, Kl. 10, Addiction and Gutter.
- Karen Marie Ørsted, better known by her stage name MØ, is a Danish singer-songwriter signed to Sony Music Entertainment. She has also featured in hit-singles including "Lean On", which charted number one in over 20 countries, and "Cold Water", which features Canadian singer Justin Bieber.
- Oh Land is a Danish singer-songwriter with great success in Europe and the US. She had her TV debut on the Late Show with David Letterman with her song "Son of a Gun" in 2010. She has been touring around the US with stars like Katy Perry in 2011. Another of her popular songs is White nights released in 2011.
- Aura is another successful singer who in 2010 reached the top of the charts in Germany and was doing well in the rest of Europe.
- Infernal are a popular group who have progressed in Europe with singers Lina Rafn and Paw Lagermann. Their most successful hits have been "From Paris to Berlin" and "Ten Miles".
- Agnes Obel is a Danish singer-songwriter. Her first album, Philharmonics, was released by PIAS Recordings on 4 October 2010 in Denmark, Norway, Germany and other European countries. Since February 2011, Philharmonics is certified double platinum. In November 2011, Obel won at the Danish Music Awards five prizes for : Best Album of the Year, Best Pop Release of the Year, Best Debut Artist of the Year, Best Female Artist of the Year and Best Songwriter of the Year. Her most famous song is "Riverside".
- Fallulah is a Danish young pop music songwriter and singer. She is known for her debut single I Lay My Head which was the prequel to the album The Black Cat Neighbourhood. Other popular songs from this album are Give Us a Little Love and Out of It. Fallulah's music can be accounted to the pop music genre but according to her own statements is a mix of indie rock and Balkan beats, which adds a hint of folklore to her productions.
- Rasmus Seebach is a Danish singer-songwriter who sings in his mother tongue language. He has had great success in the Scandinavian countries. Among his most successful songs are Lidt i fem, Natteravn and I mine øjne.
- Alphabeat, have been successful in the UK with top 20 hits "Fascination", "10,000 Nights", and "The Spell".
- Burhan G is a Danish R&B and pop singer, songwriter and producer of Kurdish/Turkish origin. In 2010 he was certified platinum in Denmark for his album Burhan G. He has had many singles including two No. 1 hits, Mest ondt featuring Medina and Tættere på himlen featuring Nik & Jay.
- Nik & Jay is a popular Danish R&B/hip hop/pop duo which has produced many popular singles such as Hot! in 2003 and Mod solnedgangen from

Popular in the early and mid 90s was the pop-soft rock band Michael Learns to Rock, whose brand of ballads made it a popular act in many Asian markets, selling nearly 9 million records in Asia. A Danish band with a big impact outside of Denmark is the Europop group Aqua, whose hit "Barbie Girl" helped the band sell a total of 15 million albums and 6 million singles.

Denmark also participates in the annual Eurovision Song Contest, and holds its own Dansk Melodi Grand Prix competition to select the song that will represent the country in the Eurovision contest. Denmark has won the Eurovision Song Contest three times: first with Grethe & Jørgen Ingmann's "Dansevise" in 1963; the second with Brødrene Olsen's (Olsen Brothers) "Fly on the Wings of Love" (from the Danish Smuk Som Et Stjerneskud, literally "Beautiful as a shooting star") in 2000. And most recently, in 2013, Emmelie de Forest with "Only Teardrops" scored 281 points at Malmö, winning the contest with a margin of 47 points over runner-up Azerbaijan. Denmark therefore hosted the Eurovision Song Contest 2014 in Copenhagen.

The Danish entrants at the Eurovision Song Contest 2010, Christina Chanée and Tomas N'evergreen with "In a Moment Like This", were already doing well in Eastern Europe ahead of the contest as their song became the most popular download in several countries.

Some hit songs of Danish origin have become international hits after being covered by foreign artists. Vengaboys covered The Walkers' "Shalala Lala", Jamelia covered Christine Milton's "Superstar", Shayne Ward covered Bryan Rice's "No Promises" and Celine Dion covered Tim Christensen's "Right Next to the Right One". Different covers of Rune's "Calabria" have also been international hits.

=== Electronic music ===
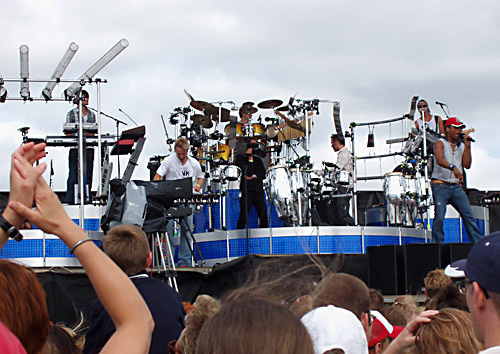
Safri Duo performing in Aarhus, 2005

Else Marie Pade was a Danish pioneer in electronic music as early as the 1950s. She knew and worked with Pierre Schaeffer and Karlheinz Stockhausen and has continued to make appearances on the Danish electronica scene well into the new millennium. With his Coma parties, Kenneth Bager brought acid house to Denmark in 1988 and was active in building a Danish club scene, moving venues from the discothèques to deserted factories and basements. The most successful Danish electronic musician internationally is Trentemøller while from a very early age Mike Sheridan has achieved success and been labelled a name of the future. In the more mainstream part of the genre, Safri Duo also experienced international success with their mixture of tribal sound and electronica; also in the electronic scene adding elements of string and brass instruments is the indie folk/electronic four-piece Efterklang.

A leading Danish venue for electronic music is Culture Box in Copenhagen which is subsidised by the Ministry of Culture as a regional music venue, enabling it to keep a high artistic profile. The Strøm and Copenhagen Distortion festivals are also dedicated to the capital's electronic and club music scene.

Jesper Kyd is a famous Danish video game composer, who has been incorporating sounds of dark ambient, electronic and symphonic music into his music and has won many awards.

Martin Jensen with the UK hit "Solo Dance".

=== Folk ===
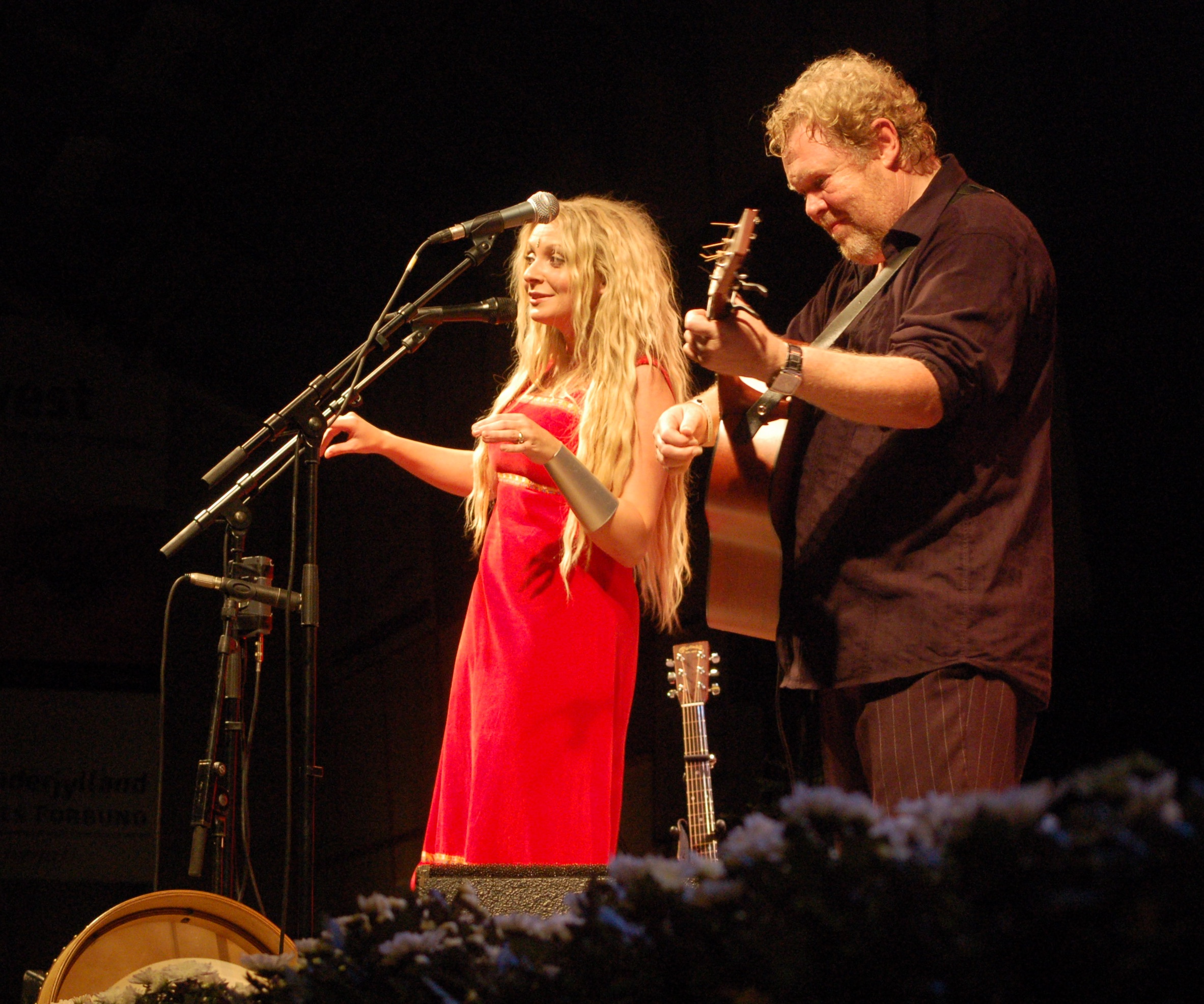
Sebastian performing with Eivør Pálsdóttir at Tønder in 2006

Traditionally, Danish folk music has relied on a fiddle and accordion duo but, unlike its Scandinavian neighbours, Danish fiddlers almost always play in groups with few solo performance. Danish bands also tend to feature the guitar more prominently than the other Nordic countries.

Fiddle and accordion duos play generally rhythmic dance music, local versions of the Nordic folk dance music. The oldest variety is called pols, and it is now mostly found on Fanø with variants such as Sønderhoning from Sønderho.

The first systematic collection of popular folk songs, some of which go back centuries, was undertaken by the folklore collector Evald Tang Kristensen (1843–1929). These important sources were then transferred to the Danish Folklore Archives, established in 1904. The popular dance music tradition was continued into the 20th century by musicians such as the violinist Evald Thomsen (1913–93).

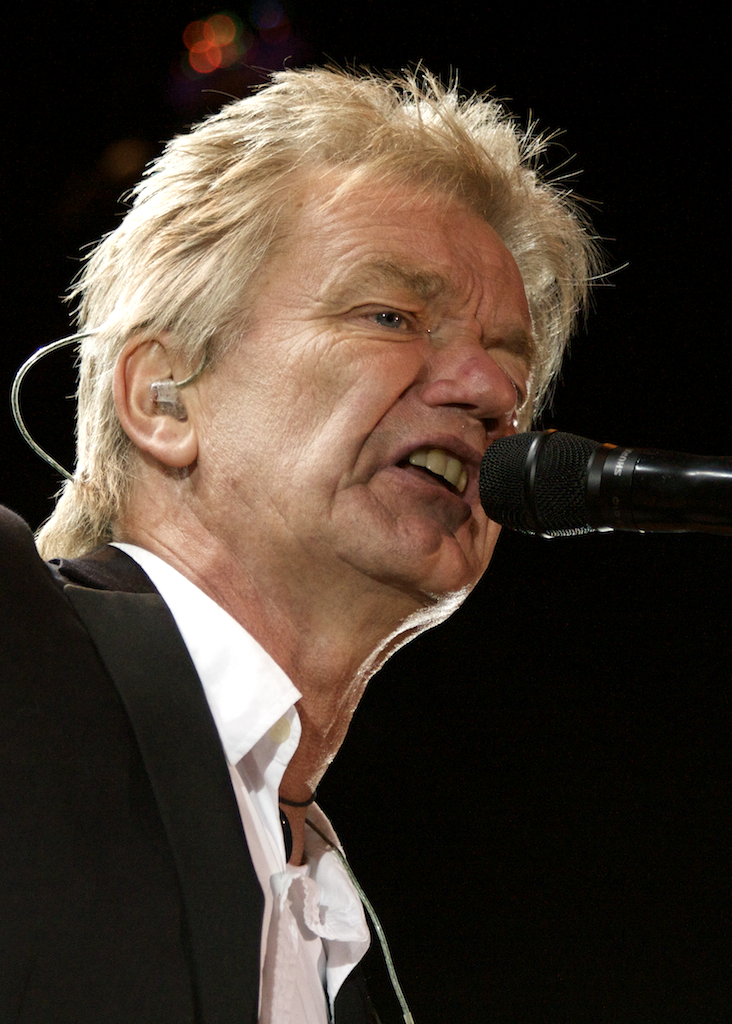
Lars Lilholt

Danish traditional music experienced a renaissance when the Anglo-American folk song wave hit Denmark around 1970. Among the prominent soloists, often composing new songs, were Sebastian, Poul Dissing and Niels Hausgaard. The successful Lars Lilholt Band led by the violinist Lars Lilholt combines the folk music tradition with rock. A new and refreshing combination of techno music and medieval ballads has been provided by the group Sorten Muld since their first recording in 1996.

The formation of the Danish Folk Council to actively promote folk music both at home and abroad has helped raise the profile. Curiously, Danish folk music received its biggest boost from the home chart success of Sorten Muld, who used acoustic and electric instruments and electronica on old songs to create something very contemporary on its best-selling albums. Some of the best-known artists in recent years include Harald Haugaard and Dreamers' Circus.

== Music schools ==
As part of the reform of Danish municipalities in 2008 it was established by law that each of the 98 municipalities runs a music school. The first Danish music schools were formed in the 1930s with inspiration from Germany. From 1991 Musikloven – Law on Music – has had a chapter on music schools. According to the law the purposes of the music schools are to develop and support the musical talents and knowledge and to enhance music in the local communities. The primary goal is to engage with children and youth (0–24 years), but activities for adults are also possible. The financing of the music schools are divided among state, municipality and students (or parents of students).

== Music in everyday life ==
Music is an important part of the lives of most Danes. One of the carefully observed traditions is to include music at celebrations at large, including family oriented ones such as wedding parties, birthdays and anniversaries. Indeed, it is not only common to engage one or more musicians for dancing but it is usual for the guests to write songs, normally to well-known traditional tunes, in honour of those to be celebrated.

There is also a popular tradition of choir singing. There are hundreds of amateur choirs throughout Denmark, usually specialising in traditional Danish songs or folk music.

Denmark has two national anthems, which are widely performed. Der er et yndigt land (There Is a Lovely Country) is sung loudly and enthusiastically at sporting events and is the most popular. Lyrics are by the Danish poet Adam Oehlenschläger and music by Hans Ernst Krøyer. Kong Kristian stod ved højen mast (King Christian Stood by Tow'ring Mast), is sung on official occasions when the royal family is represented. Lyrics are by Johannes Ewald while music was probably written by Ditlev Ludwig Rogert and can be heard in the final tableau of Elverhøj.

== Popular venues ==
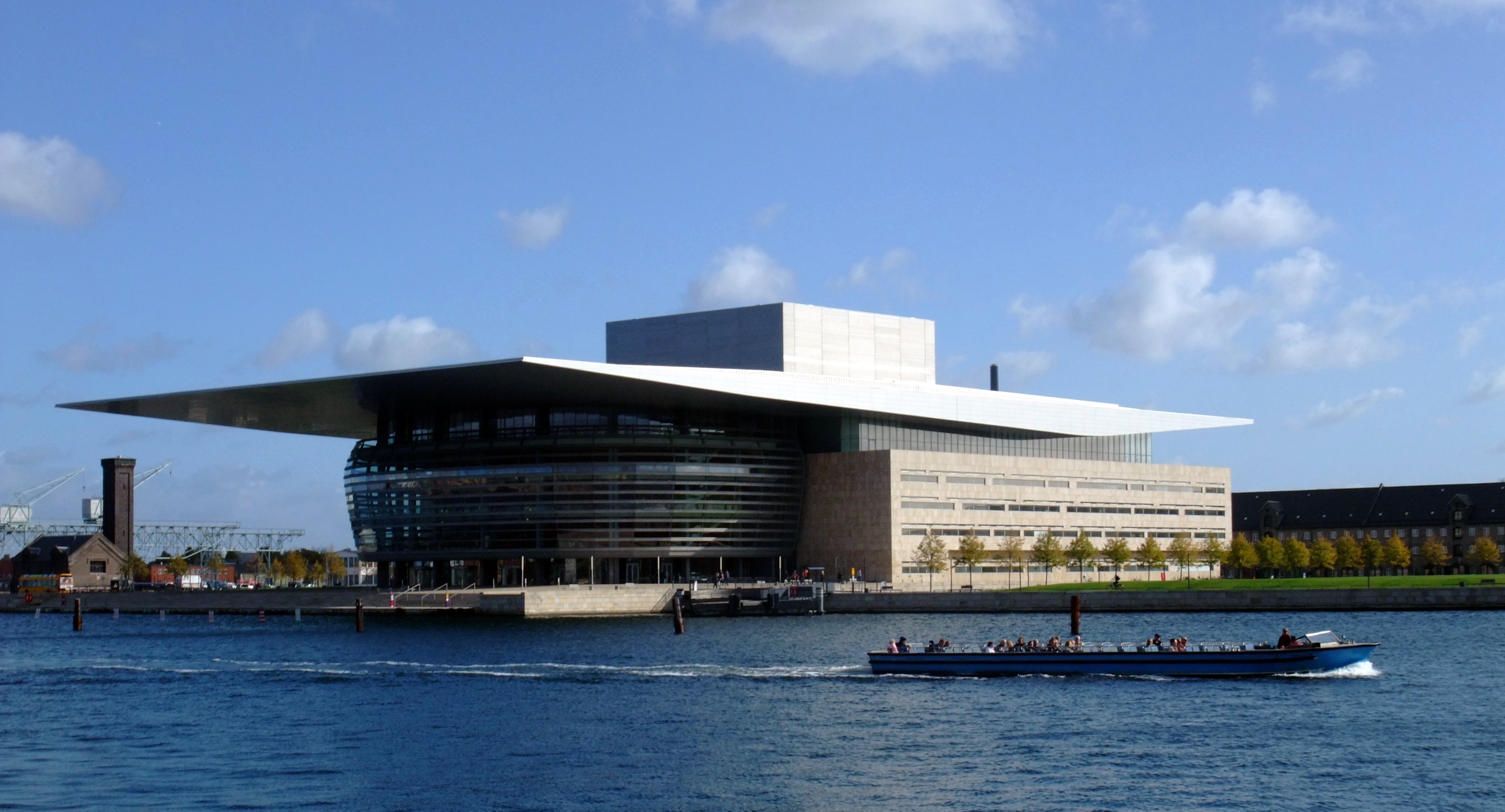
Copenhagen Opera House

In recent years, there have been two important developments for the Danish music scene. The first was the opening of the Copenhagen Opera House in 2005 where ever since full houses have applauded the performances of the great European operas and some of Denmark's more recent contributions. The other was the completion of Danmarks Radio's Concert Hall in 2009 where the national broadcaster not only presents its orchestral music but also choirs, jazz, rock and pop.

Other important venues for music include:

- The Old Stage of the Royal Danish Theatre in the centre of Copenhagen where in particular performances of the Royal Danish Ballet can be seen.

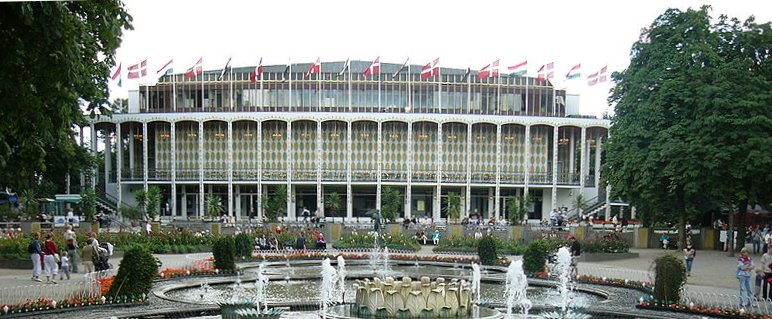
Tivoli Concert Hall

- The Tivoli Concert Hall in the Tivoli Gardens where orchestral music, singers, jazz and other musical events feature in the programme every summer, frequently with the participation of the Tivoli Symphony Orchestra.
- Det Ny Theater in Copenhagen specializes in Danish productions of musicals.
- Musikhuset Aarhus, the Concert Hall of Aarhus, presents a wide variety of classical and popular music including singing and dance.

== Festivals ==
Music festivals are plentiful throughout the country and are very popular, with more than 130,000 attendees at Roskilde Festival, the largest music festival in Northern Europe and around 300,000 partygoers to Copenhagen Distortion street festival. Many smaller recurring music festivals of all genres are held throughout and on all times of the year. This includes the Copenhagen Jazz Festival, the traveling Grøn Koncert, Tønder Festival, Aalborg Opera Festival, Thy Chamber Music Festival and Skagen Festival, among many others.

== See also ==
- List of Danish bands
- List of Danish composers
- Danish jazz
- Danish rock
- Music of the Faroe Islands
- Music of Greenland
- Roskilde Festival
- Danish Music Awards
- European Composer and Songwriter Alliance (ECSA)
- Danish Culture Canon

== Sources ==
- Cronshaw, Andrew. "A New Pulse for the Pols". 2000. In Broughton, Simon and Ellingham, Mark with McConnachie, James and Duane, Orla (Ed.), World Music, Vol. 1: Africa, Europe and the Middle East, pp 58–63. Rough Guides Ltd, Penguin Books. ISBN 1-85828-636-0
