= Fredrik Lundin =

Danish jazz musician (born 1963)

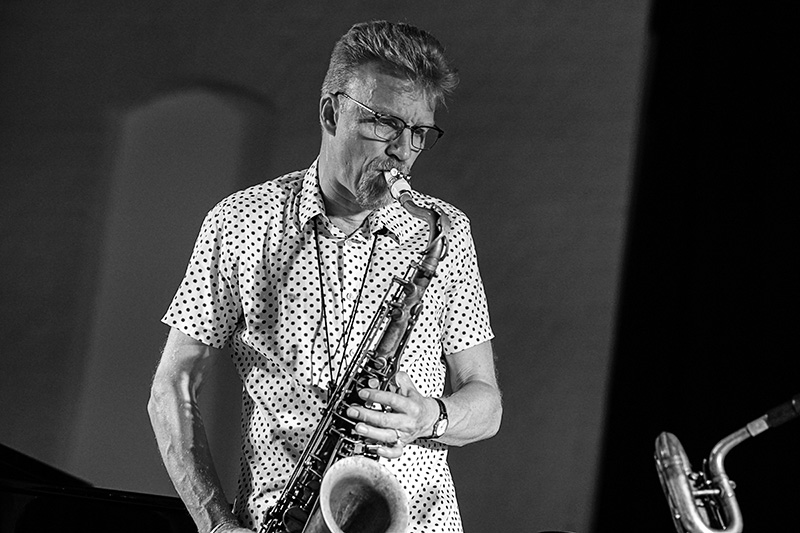
- At Copenhagen Jazz Festival 2018

Background information
- Born: 7 April 1963 (age 62)
- Origin: Copenhagen, Denmark
- Genres: Jazz,
- Occupations: Musician, bandleader
- Instruments: Tenor saxophone and Soprano saxophone
- Years active: 1981–present
- Labels: Stunt Records
- Website: www.fredriklundin.com/

Fredrik Lundin (born 7 April 1963) is a Danish jazz saxophonist, composer and bandleader. Having founded his first jazz quartet in 1981, he has become one of the most expressive saxophonists in Danish jazz and also one of the most prolific ones.

Lundin is currently the leader of the 11-piece Fredrik Lundin Overdrive, founded in 2000. He is also a member of Jon Balke's Magnetic North Orchestra, Jonas Johansen Move, Sound of Choice, Peter Danemo Kapell, Bo Stief New Dreams and Michael Blicher Five Songs.

== Biography ==
Lundin was born in Copenhagen in 1963 and grew up in Helsingør north of the city. His first instrument was the flute, which he played for five years before picking up the saxophone. In 1981 he founded the Frederik Lundin Quartet and also joined the European Youth Jazz Orchestra. From 1982 to 1986, he played in the Erling Kroner Tentet.

Fredrik Lundin Overdrive was founded in 2000. Its debut cd, Choose Your Boots (2001), received several awards, including a Danish Music Award for best jazz release 2001. In 2004 a second album, Fredrik Lundin Overdrive Plays The Music of Leadbelly, Belly-up, was released. It features Lundin's arrangements of the music of blues/folk legend Huddie "Leadbelly" Ledbetter. The band has toured Scandinavia, Spain and Canada.

In 2003 Lundin was invited to put together a group for the official opening concert of Copenhagen Jazz Festival. The group, Basalt, performed all original music by Lundin. The concert was recorded by the Danmarks Radio.

Other artists with whom he has worked and recorded include Marilyn Mazur (Sax Dance, the JazzPar Prize orchestra), Kenneth Knudsen, Jon Balke (Saturation), Django Bates, Niels-Henning Ørsted Pedersen (with Henrik Metz), Pierre Dørge (New Jungle Orchestra, a week long engagement at Sweet Basil in New York) Steve Swallow (with Jørgen Emborg), Aske Jacoby and Kasper Winding.

== Compositions ==
As a composer, Lundin has covered many different areas. Trine-Lise Væring has put lyrics to and recorded a number of his songs, and he has delivered material to Jonas Johansen Move. Works of his have been commissioned and recorded by Copenhagen Art Ensemble, (the albums My Sisters Garden and Angels Share), New Music Orchestra,(for Copenhagen Jazzfestivals) and The JazzPar Nonet.

He has composed music for dance performances (e.g. Regndråben for Thomas Eisenhardt and Rå Flade for Lars Dahl Pedersen) and a number of children's theatre plays directed by Jacques Matthiessen. He has written music for chamber orchestras, e.i. Madame Claude and Ensemble Nord, and Copenhagen Saxophone Quartet has commissioned and recorded a work by him on Six Danish Composers.

== Teaching ==
Fredrik Lundin also teaches saxophone, composition and ensemble playing at the Rhythmic Music Conservatory in Copenhagen.

== Awards ==
- 1982: Sørens Penge (talent prize)
- 1984: Scholarship from the Léonie Sonnings Musikfond
- 1986: JASA-prizen (Danish jazz journalists prize)
- 1991: Hafnias Tonekunstnerlegat
- 1991: The Ministry of Culture (Statens Kunstfond) awarded him a prize for his "outstanding creative playing".
- 1995: DJBFA honorary prize
- 1997: 3-year grant from the ministry of culture
- 1997* Grant from Laurens Bogtman Foundation.
- 2001: Danish Music Award for best jazzrelease 2001 for Choose Your Boots
- 2005: Danish Music Award for best jazzrelease 2005 Fredrik Lundin Overdrive Plays The Music of Leadbelly, Belly-up.
- 2007 Ben Webster Prize

== Gallery ==
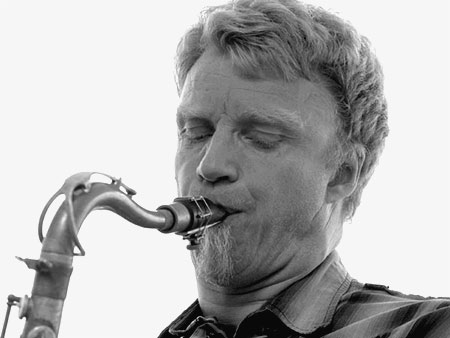

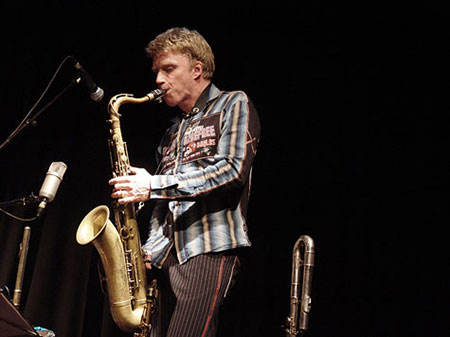

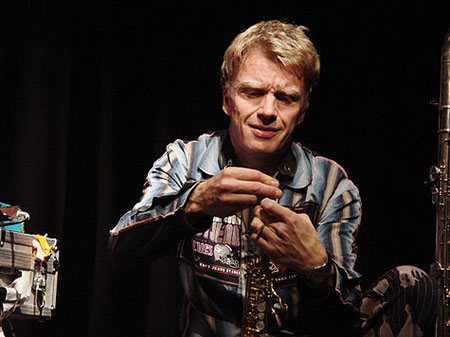

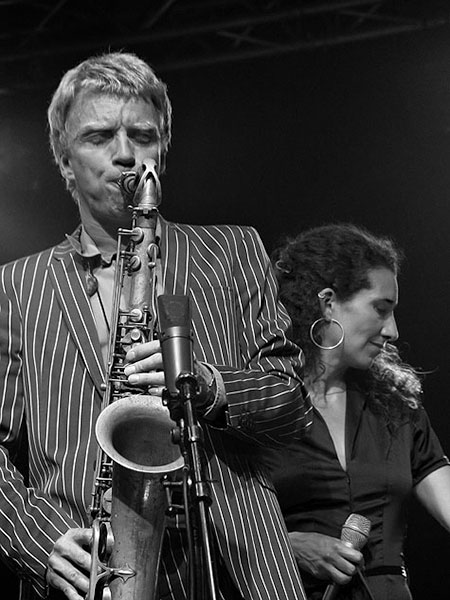

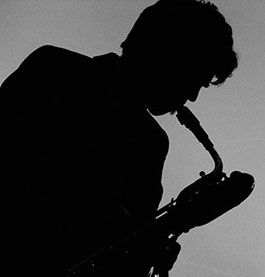

== Discography ==
- Twilight Land (1986)
- The Cycle (1987)
- Pieces of... (1990)
- People, Places, Times and Faces (1992)
- Desde el norde.. (1997)
- Music For Dancers and Dreamers (1997)
- Choose Your Boots (2001)
- Fredrik Lundin Overdrive Plays the Music of Leadbelly, Belly-up (2004)
- Offpiste Gurus (2010)
- In Case of Fire (2015)

== See also ==
- Danish jazz
