= Almost Big Band =

13 piece jazz band formed by Ernie Wilkins in 1980

The Almost Big Band was a 13-piece jazz band formed by Ernie Wilkins in 1980 after his permanent move to Copenhagen, Denmark. Members included expatriate American such as Kenny Drew and Ed Thigpen as well as prominent Danish jazz musicians such as Jesper Thilo and Bent Jaedig.

Mainly an arranger, Wilkins created the band so he could write for a band of his own formation. In America the band remained underrated and overlooked.

== Current members ==
- Benny Rosenfeld, lead trumpet
- Mårten Lundgren, trumpet
- Gerard Presencer, trumpet
- Vincent Nilsson, lead trombone
- Kim Aagaard, trombone
- Jan zum Vohrde, lead alto
- Pernille Bévort, tenor saxophone
- Jan Harbeck, tenor saxophone
- Jesper Løvdal, baritone sax, bandleader
- Nikolaj Bentzon, piano
- Jesper Lundgaard, bass
- Aage Tanggaard, drums

== Past members ==
- Jesper Thilo, tenor saxophone
- Jens Winther, trumpet
- Erling Kroner, trombone
- Bent Jædig tenor saxophone
- Tim Hagans, trumpeter
- Kenny Drew, piano
- Ed Thigpen, drums

== Discography ==
- Ernie Wilkins & the Almost Big Band (Storyville, 1980)
- Almost Big Band Live (Matrix Music Marketing, 1981)
- Montreux (SteepleChase, 1983)
- On the Roll (SteepleChase, 1984)
