= 555 Songs =

555 Songs (or 555 Songs for Primary School) is a Danish songbook first published in 1972 by Edition Egtved and edited by Thomas Alvad and Svend-G. Asmussen. The songbook was intended as a Danish school songbook, aimed at grades 2 to 10 in the Danish school system. 555 Songs provides melodies for a single voice, lyrics, and, for some songs, also chord notation. The second edition removed chord notations from 128 melodies due to copyright reasons. As the title indicates, the songbook contains 555 songs.

555 Songs distinguishes between songs, hymns, and children's songs. The majority are in Danish, but there are also songs in Norwegian, Swedish, English, German, French, and Hebrew.

555 Songs with melody lines and chord notations has been called "truly an innovation" and one of "the market's most prominent songbooks". A ruling in 1987 stated that since its first publication in 1972, it had been printed in a total of 250,000 copies. 555 Songs is remembered by Katrine Frøkjær Baunvig for having been used in the 1990s. It was still used in the 2000s. 555 Songs is considered to have inspired the 4th edition of Danish School Songbook. Hans Sydow states that he learned to play from 555 Songs as a child. Joan Kirk Jensen's debut novel Ødeland mentions the songbook in passing with "We sing in the morning, from 555 Songs. We sing 'Rapanden Rasmus from Rinkenæs Sogn.'"

In the decade following its publication, the publisher released a supplementary songbook titled 151 Other Songs, edited by Bente Laursen. This collected songs that had gained popularity in school education over the past ten years. Songwriters such as Lennon-McCartney, Cornelis Vreeswijk, Poul Henningsen, Benny Andersen, Bernhard Christensen, and Mogens Jermiin Nissen were among those represented with multiple songs.
