= Jan Harbeck =

Danish jazz musician and composer (born 1975)

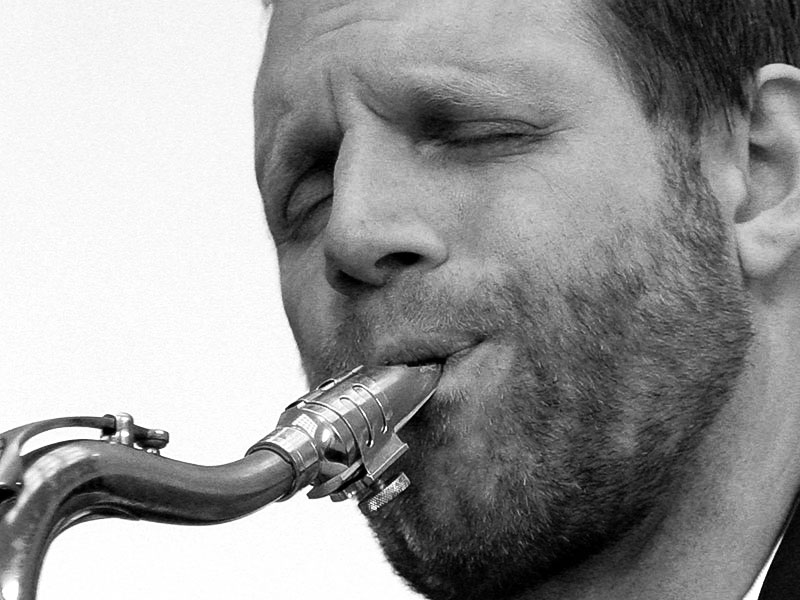

Background information
- Born: 13 April 1975 (age 51); Aarhus, Denmark
- Origin: Danish
- Genre: Jazz
- Occupations: Musician, composer
- Instruments: Saxophones, clarinet, flute
- Label: Stunt Records
- Website: www.janharbeck.com

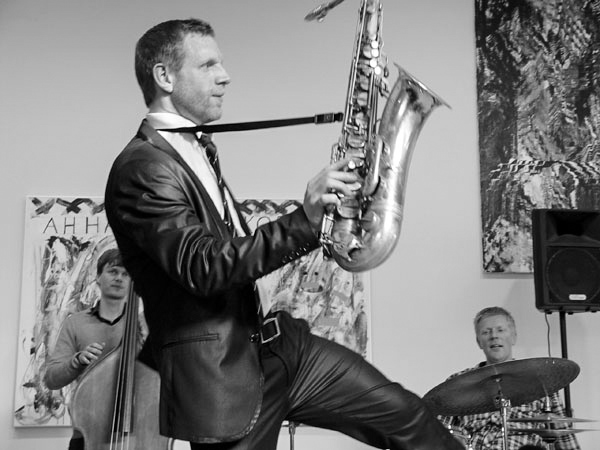
Jan Harbeck in Aarhus

Jan Harbeck (born 13 April 1975) is a Danish jazz musician (saxophones, flaute, clarinet) and composer.

== Biography ==
Harbeck attended the Royal Academy of Music, Aarhus/Aalborg to study music and later went on to further studies at The New School in New York City. Besides two ensembles of his own, Jan Harbeck Quartet and Live Jive Jungle, he performs with a series of other orchestras. In 2006 he was awarded the Walter Klæbel Prize, in 2009 a Danish Grammy for Best album of the year, and in 2011 the prestigious Bent Jædig Prize.

With his own self titled quartet he released the album In the Still of the Night (2008), receiving a grammy at the Danish Music Awards. It was followed up by Copenhagen Nocturne in 2011. They play modern acoustic jazz with a mix of original compositions and jazz standards. In 2014 they released their third album Variations in Blue with Walter Smith III.

== Honors ==
- 2006: Awarded the Walter Klæbel Prize
- 2008: Nominated New Danish Jazz Act of the Year at the Copenhagen Jazz Festival
- 2009: Awarded the Danish Jazz Album of the Year 2008, for the album In the Still of the Night at the Danish Music Awards
- 2011: Awarded the Bent Jædig Prize
- 2018: Awarded the Ben Webster Prize

== Discography ==
=== Solo albums ===
- 2003: Landors (Cope Records), Harbeck/Agesen/Johnsen
- 2005: HAVL – Who is it? (Twangster Records)
- 2008: In the Still of the Night (Stunt Records), with Jan Harbeck Quartet
- 2011: Copenhagen Nocturne (Stunt Records), with Jan Harbeck Quartet
- 2014: Variations in Blue (Stunt Records), with Jan Harbeck Quartet feat. Walter Smith III
- 2017: Elevate (Stunt Records), with Live Jive Jungle
- 2019: The Sound The Rhythm (Stunt Records) with Jan Harbeck Quartet
- 2022: Balanced (Stunt Records) with Jan Harbeck Quartet

=== Collaborations ===
With The Ernie Wilkins Almost Big Band

- 2005: Kinda Dukish (Gazell Records), with Putte Wickman
- 2007: Out Of This World (Stunt Records), with Bobo Moreno

With The Orchestra

- 2005: Pieces of Mind (Cope Records)
- 2014: Money (Gateway Records)

With Malene Kjærgård

- 2013: Happy Feet (Calibrated Records)
- 2016: Here’s To The Ladies (Calibrated Records)

With others

- 2004: Tango for Bad People (Sweet Silence Records), with the Beijbom Kroner Big Band
- 2006: Tango jalousie and all that jazz (Calibrated Records), with the New Music Orchestra
- 2006: Live from Paradise (Calibrated Records), with the Monday Night Big Band
- 2007: Playground +1 (Calibrated Records), with Bévort-Schmidt
- 2008: EKMNO B3 (Calibrated Records), with New Music Orchestra
- 2009: Turn on the heat (Little Beat Records), with the Ib Glindemann's Orchestra
- 2010: Sparring (Gateway Records), with Dellbeck
- 2011: Blues Modernism (Calibrated Records), with Snorre Kirk Sextet
- 2011: Funkenstein (Do It Again Records), with the Bentzon Brotherhood
- 2012: Free Falling (Calibrated Records), with Mads Mathias
- 2013: Come Sunday (Music Mecca), with Kjeld Lauritsen and Espen Laub von Lillienskjold
- 2014: WhiteAlive at the Metronome (Mighty Blue Records), with Franck White
- 2015: Europa (Calibrated Records), with Snorre Kirk Quintet
- 2015: Playhouse (Gateway Records), with Claus Waidtløw & The Orchestra
- 2015: Kick off your shoes (Gateway Records), with Louise Bøttern
- 2015: New strides (Gateway Records), with Tommy Høeg Quartet
