= Valdemar Eiberg =

Danish jazz musician (1892–1965)

Valdemar Eiberg (23 August 1892 – 4 July 1965) was a Danish jazz musician.

Eiberg formed what is thought to be the first Danish jazz orchestra in 1923, and in 1924, his ensemble recorded the earliest known examples of Danish jazz, "I've Got a Cross-Eyed Papa" b/w "In Bluebird Land".

Eiberg's band became a launching pad for musicians who came to prominence in the Golden Age of Danish Jazz, including Kai Ewans, Kjeld Bonfils, Leo Mathisen, Peter Rasmussen, and Svend Asmussen.
