= Erik Moseholm =

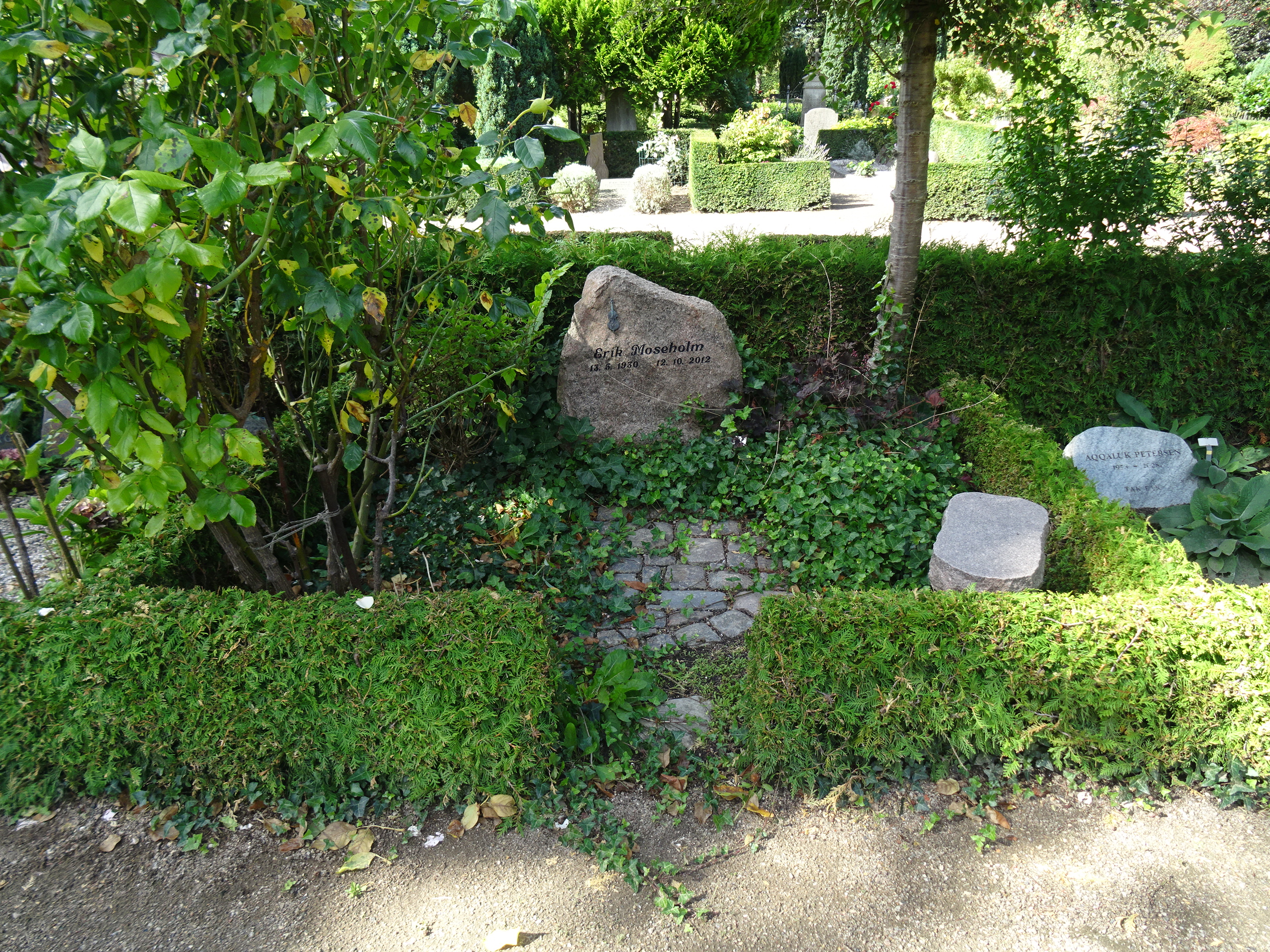
The grave of Erik Moseholm in Copenhagen.

Erik Moseholm (13 May 1930 – 12 October 2012) was a Danish jazz bassist, composer, bandleader and music administrator. He was the leader of the DR Big Band from 1961 to 1966 and the principal of the Rhythmic Music Conservatory in Copenhagen from 1992 to 1997.

== Career as a musician ==
Erik Moseholm was born in Fredericia and already as a teenager he performed with his own band in his home town.. In 1948 he moved to Copenhagen where he soon became one of the most significant modern jazz musicians of his day. He was also active in Classical music. His work is documented on some 50 albums and he has recorded with international stars such as Don Byas and Eric Dolphy. He also played in the chamber ensemble Societas Musica and as a soloist with the Copenhagen Symphony Orchestra. Over the years he led a number of ensembles of varying sizes, including the RadioJazzgruppen from 1961 to 1966 and RD Big Band far 1966 to 1992.

As a music composer he composed music for all sizes of orchestras and also created theatre and film music.

From 1998, as a bassist and composer, he has collaborated with his wife, the storyteller and actress Vigga Bro.

== Career as a music administrator ==
After his time as band leader of the DR Big Band, Moseholm went on to work for the DR, including as the administrative leader of the big band. From 1992 to 1997 he was principal of the Rhythmic Music Conservatory in Copenhagen.

From his various platforms, Moseholm has been a driving force behind numerous initiatives in the Danish rhythmical music environment. These include: orchestra tours to schools, various workshops and the foundation of organisations such as DJBFA, DJF, and FaJaBeFa. He was also involved in the establishment of Nordisk Workshop and Mordjazz.

== Awards and accolades ==
- 1958: Danish Jazz Musician of the Year
- 1960: European Jazz Bassist of the Year
- 1998: Order of the Dannebrog

== See also ==
- Danish jazz
- List of Danish composers, Juan-Les-Pins Jazz Festival, France
