= StoRMChaser =

- Origin: Copenhagen, Denmark
- Genres: jazz
- Years active: 2006-present
- Label: Lost Marbles Records
- Members: Django Bates

StoRMChaser is a Danish jazz big band/orchestra led by British musician Django Bates comprising his students from Copenhagen's RMC, Rhythmic Music Conservatory,

== History ==
StoRMChaser is Bates’ most recent project to date and is drawn from the young post-graduate students from the courses he leads at the Rhythmic Music Conservatory in Copenhagen, Denmark. As with Bates' other current big band/orchestra, Delightful Precipice, StoRMChaser is a 19-piece band.

The band name incorporates the acronym of Rhythmic Music Conservatory. Bates notes “What I said at my (2005) interview (for the Rhythmic Music Conservatory) was that if I got the job, if I got the chance, I'd form a band with the letters RMC in the name and take it round the world and put the RMC on the map. They looked at me for a moment and then it was kind of, "Go on then, do it."

Regarding the band, Bates has commented “The young musicians of StoRMChaser are at the tip of their international careers and accept that music of substance and detail may take months to slot together. Their reward is that they are the only people in the world who can play this music with the required level of joy, commitment, and understanding.”

The band has played live with Django Bates on various occasions, in particular on the British tour in autumn 2008 to promote the Bates album on which they had performed that year - Spring Is Here (Shall We Dance?). Reviewing one of these concerts in The Guardian, John Fordham commented " (Bates) encourages as many people as possible to play different things at the same time, and frequently to play off the beat as well. The result not only hangs together, but hurtles dizzyingly, and sometimes hilariously, into space.”

In a 2008 interview on the All About Jazz website, Bates described his work with the band in these terms:

“I thought "Spring Is Here" would work with StoRMChaser, because I've worked a lot with young musicians, presenting them with what is in some ways complex music, and it's always been my experience that if you go at it with utter confidence and commitment it's successful. When you start, it's an enormous mountain to climb — sometimes we'd rehearse something for a week and then there'd be a gig where we could try it out — but the adrenalin and the excitement that is created by the process kick in and you're swept along with it... We meet every Friday and just keep pressing home, playing around, having fun. The RMC set-up means I can experiment. To have a band like this that I can play around with every Friday—it's a real luxury. It's something people like Duke Ellington had. Ellington had his band on a retainer and so he could always call them up when he needed to and say, "Could you come in and play this chord for me? It's a wonderful resource to have. I had it back in the days of Loose Tubes. We met up even when there was nothing new to play. It was like a social commitment, a very nice social commitment. It gives the opportunity to try out ideas — slow processes, rather than the usual thing where you write all the music and go into the studio and read it, nail it, get it down and that's that.”

== Discography ==
on Django Bates’ albums:

- Spring Is Here (Shall We Dance?), Lost Marble Recordings, LM003
