= Kjeld Bonfils =

Kjeld Bonfils (August 23, 1918 – October 13, 1984) was a Danish jazz pianist and vibraphone player.

Bonfils, who was born in Copenhagen, was one of the figures involved in the "Golden Age" of Danish jazz in the 1930s. During the Nazi occupation of Denmark from 1940–45, jazz was discouraged by the regime, but Bonfils played with Svend Asmussen in Valdemar Eiberg's band, as well as elsewhere, and jazz became a symbol of the underground and political protest. Bonfils was hailed as one of the best soloists of his day.
