= Mads Mathias =

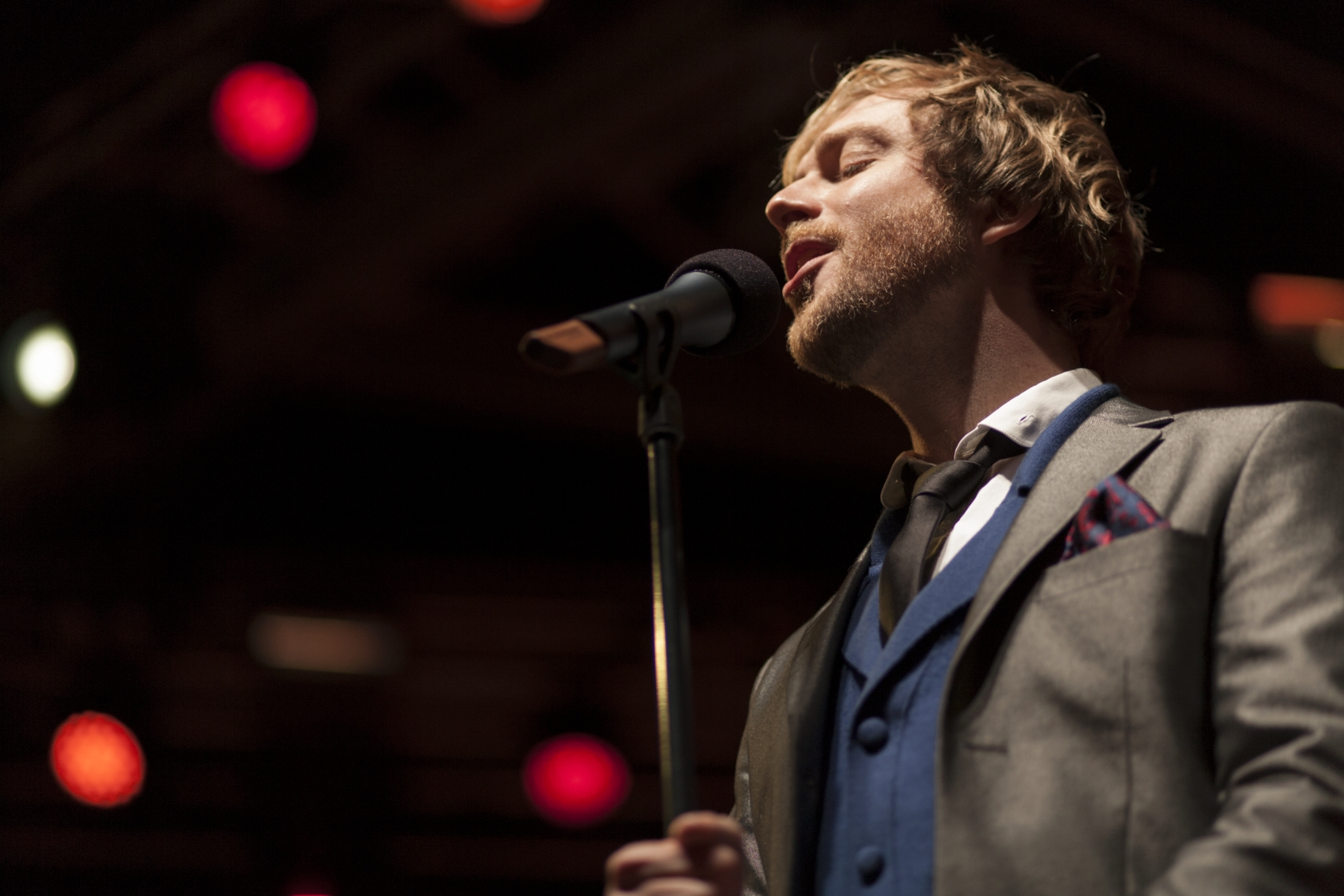
- Mads Mathias in 2014

Background information
- Born: Jull Johanssen; 1981 (age 44–45); Silkeborg, Denmark
- Genres: Jazz
- Occupation: Singer
- Instrument: Saxophone
- Website: www.madsmathias.dk

Juul Johansson better known as Mads Mathias is a Danish singer, saxophonist and songwriter. He has formed his own Mads Mathias Orchestra releasing his album Free Falling in 2012 winning "Best New Danish Jazz Artist of the Year".

== Career ==
Johansson grew up partly in his native town of Silkeborg, Denmark and partly in Tanzania. He grew in a musical home exploring music since his infancy picking the saxophone as his main instrument at age 11. In an unfortunate car accident, Mads' right hand was injured at age 17 and he lost his index finger and half of two other fingers. Afraid that his days of playing the saxophone was over, he started singing and writing songs instead. Fortunately the rehabilitation of his hand made him able to play the saxophone again and at age 20 he was admitted to the Rhythmic Music Conservatory, where he received a diploma in 2007.

In 2012 released debut solo album Free Falling which won him a Danish Music Award for "Best New Danish Jazz Artist of the Year". He was nominated for "Danish Vocal Release of year" for the album during the same awards ceremony. He also won an Honorable Mention Award at one of the world's largest songwriting competitions for his song "Fool for Love" and Kvintet with the addition of Espen Laub in addition to critical reviews and airplay on Danish radio stations DR P1, DR P4, and P8 JAZZ.

Besides his own Mads Mathias Orchestra, Mads formed Mads Mathias Kvartet with Peter Rosendal, Regin Fuhlendorf and Morten Ankarfeldt) and appears with The Danish Radio Big Band, Tivoli Big Band and Six City Stompers.

From an early age, Mads Mathias was a part of Jutland jazz scene. Today Mads Mathias part of the Danish music scene: As a studio musician, he has contributed to several record releases and frequently used live musician, he has played with names like American Leroy Jones, British Bob Wilber, British-American Billy Cross, Brazilian Paulo Moura and Danish artists Anne Linnet, Per Vers, Alphabeat, Sinne Eeg, Thomas Buttenschon, Martin Hall, Jens Fink-Jensen and Karen Mukupa.

== Discography ==
=== Albums ===
- 2012: Free Falling (Calibrated)
- 2021: I‘m All Ears (Storyville Records)
