= Uffe Baadh =

Danish-born American jazz musician (1923–1980)

Uffe Baadh, also known as Frank Bode, (7 August 1923 – November 22, 1980) was a Danish-born American jazz musician. He emigrated to the United States in 1947 to play drums in the big bands of Harry James, Tommy Dorsey, and Claude Thornhill, recording with Elvis Presley, Henry Mancini, and others.

== Early life ==
Uffe Baadh was born on 7 August 1923, in Aarhus, Denmark. He was the youngest of four siblings. His father, William Baadh, was a doctor and his mother was a housewife. When his parents divorced in 1937, he moved with his mother, Valborg Marie [Dinesen] Baadh, and brother Hans to Copenhagen. His formal music studies trained him in classical percussion as well as jazz, and his ability to read music notation, unusual for drummers at that time, served him well in joining different bands and orchestras. Becoming known for his flamboyant style and lively sound, he played in bands including Niels Foss with singer Freddy Albeck, and Kai Ewans Orchestra in Tivoli Gardens until 1943 when the Nazi Occupation closed Tivoli and set an 8pm curfew, thus closing all nightclubs, joining the jazz greats who created the so-called "Golden Age of Jazz" in Denmark. A recording was made from 1943, with Niels Foss, Midsummer Swing.

He married Shirley Goldberg on October 1, 1951, in Virginia, USA. They had two daughters, Valerie and Lise, born in California.

== Sweden ==
Uffe Baadh registered at a refugee camp in Sweden on December 9, 1943, carrying his cymbals in his jacket. He made his way to Stockholm, working as a dishwasher at a restaurant. He performed on December 26, 1943 in an evening of small-band swing at Stockholm Concert Hall on a set of borrowed drums as a member of a group of Danish jazz musicians, all refugees. In 1944 he toured Sweden with Alice Babs as well as played and recorded with the famous Thore Ehrling Big Band. He joined the Danish All-Star band which broadcast weekly on Saturday nights from Stockholm, and played with Rolf Ericson (trumpet), Georg Vernon (trombone), Carl-Henrik Norin (clarinet, tenor saxophone), Charles Norman (piano) Thore Jederby (bass) in recording his original composition, Greetings To Sweden, Stockholm, Sweden, October 2, 1944. Uffe is reported in a Swedish jazz magazine as the finest drummer in Scandinavia. He joined the Danish Brigade in the spring of 1945, training at a camp in Skåne in the south of Sweden. He returned to Denmark on the first day of Danish liberation on April 5, 1945, in uniform.

== Return to Copenhagen ==
Journalist Bent Henius and Uffe were both assigned to the "sapper squad" upon arrival in Denmark, and although 90% of brigadiers were demobilized after a few weeks, they were sent to Jutland where they supervised, under the direction of British command, the dangerous disarming of millions of mines along the Western coast by surrendered German soldiers. By July, 1945, Uffe Baadh joined Peter Rasmussen's band, playing each night at Skandia in Copenhagen and on tour to Sweden, where he met his lifelong friend, Swedish pianist Lars "Bob" Laine, and on to Norway, the Netherlands, Portugal. In October, 1945, Uffe Baadh's Sextet recorded Greetings to Sweden with Charles Norman, piano, and other great musicians of the era, featuring Uffe in a drum solo. A photo of Uffe Baadh is featured in the article, Don Redman's 1946 European Tour, Documenting an Important Event in European Jazz History. In June, 1964, Uffe returned to Denmark with his wife, Shirley, for a summer tour of concerts and broadcasts, and again in 1970 for medical treatment.

== New York Jazz ==
Uffe Baadh emigrated to the United States, arriving July 16, 1947 in NYC, where jazz baron Timme Rosenkrantz arranged jam sessions at Club Bohemia every Friday. Upon arrival, he took the advice of his music buddies to change his name to something English speakers could pronounce, so he picked the name Frank Bode out of a phone book in NYC. He performed and recorded under this name for the rest of his life, with big bands of Harry James and His All-Star Orchestra, Stan Hasselgard and His All Star Six, Claude Thornhill and His Band of Renown, and Benny Goodman’s Concert Trio among others.

== Hollywood Jazz ==
Uffe traveled to Los Angeles in 1947-48 with legendary Swedish jazz clarinetist Stan Hasselgaard, where they recorded California Sessions, including the tune Swedish Pastry as well as his own composition, Greetings To Sweden. He's featured with Wardell Gray's International All-Stars 1947 along with lifelong friend Red Callender. He permanently moved there in 1951, and worked with Benny Goodman's Concert Trio (1948), Gerry Mulligan, Barney Kessel, Dodo Marmarosa, Mel Powell, Rhonda Fleming, Elvis Presley, Red Callender, Henry Mancini, Mel Tormé, Buddy Rich, Lenny Bruce, and others. He moved again with his family to work in nightclubs in Reno (1959) and Palm Springs (1960-80), playing his final gig on tour with the Tommy Dorsey Big Band on cruise ships in the Caribbean. As "Frank Bode", he is featured in the on-screen band and recorded soundtrack on the hit TV series, Peter Gunn, and on recordings with Elvis Presley (GI Blues). One track, Pocketful of Rainbows, was part of the soundtrack of the film Jerry Maguire.

One of his closest friends, caricaturist and sketch artist Cal Bailey, used him as a subject in several works in charcoal or paint, once using Uffe's own drum brushes as a painting tool.

In his late life, he spent a lot of time performing in Palm Springs, California. He died on November 22, 1980, in Brisbane, California.

== Recordings, television, film ==
- Greetings To Sweden, 1944 Rose Room, 1944
- Stan Hasselgard, California Sessions, 1946–1947
- Wardell Gray's International All-Stars 1947, Wardell Gray: The Very Best Of
- Harry James and His Orchestra, There They Go
- Gerry Mulligan Tentette – Walking Shoes, 1953
- Red Callendar and His Modern Octet, Swinging Suite, 1956.
- Elvis Presley, G. I. Blues (A Pocketful of Rainbows); reissued on Jerry MacGuire soundtrack as Frank Bode
- Elvis Presley, G. I. Blues ("What's She Really Like") as Frank Bode
- Peter Gunn television series, 1958–60, on-screen cameos as member of featured jazz combo in nightclub, musical direction by Henry Mancini, as Frank Bode
- Thore Ehrling, Jazz Highlights, 1939–1955, 1995.
- Elvis Presley, "Command Performances: Essential 1960s Masters II", 1995.
