= Bobby Ricketts =

American-born Danish saxophonist

Bobby Ricketts is an American saxophonist based in Copenhagen, Denmark. Bobby grew up in the area around greater Boston MA. Due to several hundred appearances on various Danish television shows from ca. 1983 onward, numerous international artistic collaborations, and cultural outreach programs conducted as an Arts Envoy of the U.S. Dept. of State, his reputation has spread throughout Scandinavia, Europe, Japan, Africa, and the US.

In March 2008, Bobby Ricketts released the album "Skin To Skin" which was called "one of the most scintillating albums of 2008!" in a review by Smoothjazz.com radio personality Sandy Shore.
