= Jørgen Emborg =

Danish musician

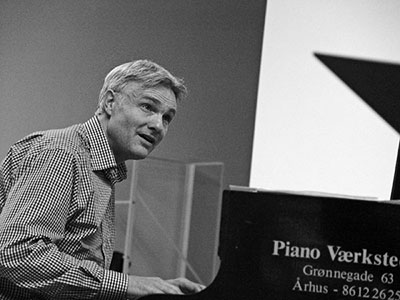
Jørgen Emborg

Jørgen Emborg (born 29 March 1953) is a Danish jazz pianist and composer, influenced by Bill Evans, Herbie Hancock and Keith Jarrett, who has given the music a lyrical, specifically Nordic feel in his compositions.

== Life and work ==
Emborg, who played at international festivals since 1975, released his first album, Sargasso, in 1979 on the Kong Pære label. In the following years he belonged to Six Winds (with Marilyn Mazur, Uffe Markussen and Alex Riel) and formed with Palle Mikkelborg, Bjarne Roupé, Bo Stief and Ole Theill the ensemble Alpha Centauri. In 1985 he received the Ben Webster Prize; the following year he recorded with Bjarne Rostvold. He worked in 1991 with Thomas Hass (Notes in Time), 1994 with Tomas Franck (Crystal Ball). In 1994, his other album under his own name Over the Rainbow on the Storyville label, with the saxophonist Fredrik Lundin, the bassist Steve Swallow and the drummer Alex Riel. From 1995 he played in the Tolvan Big Band (The Trouble and Plays the Music of Helge Albin ), 1996 in Per Carsten Quintet. He has also composed music for children, rhythmic choir music, big band, a capella work, ironworks and piano quizzes.

Emborg taught piano, theory and composition at the Rytmisk Conservatory of Music from 1988 to 2016. Jørgen Emborg's grandfather was the brother of composer Jens Laursøn Emborg .

In 1981, the LP en 20:33 with Alpha Centauri received an award from Statens Kunstfond, the State Art Foundation

In 1985, he received the Ben Webster Prize with the Frontline Fusion Group.

In 1989 he received an honorary award. from DJBFA.

In 2016 he received the lifelong honors benefit from the State Art Foundation.

== See also ==
- List of Danish composers
