= Papa Bue =

Danish trombonist and bandleader

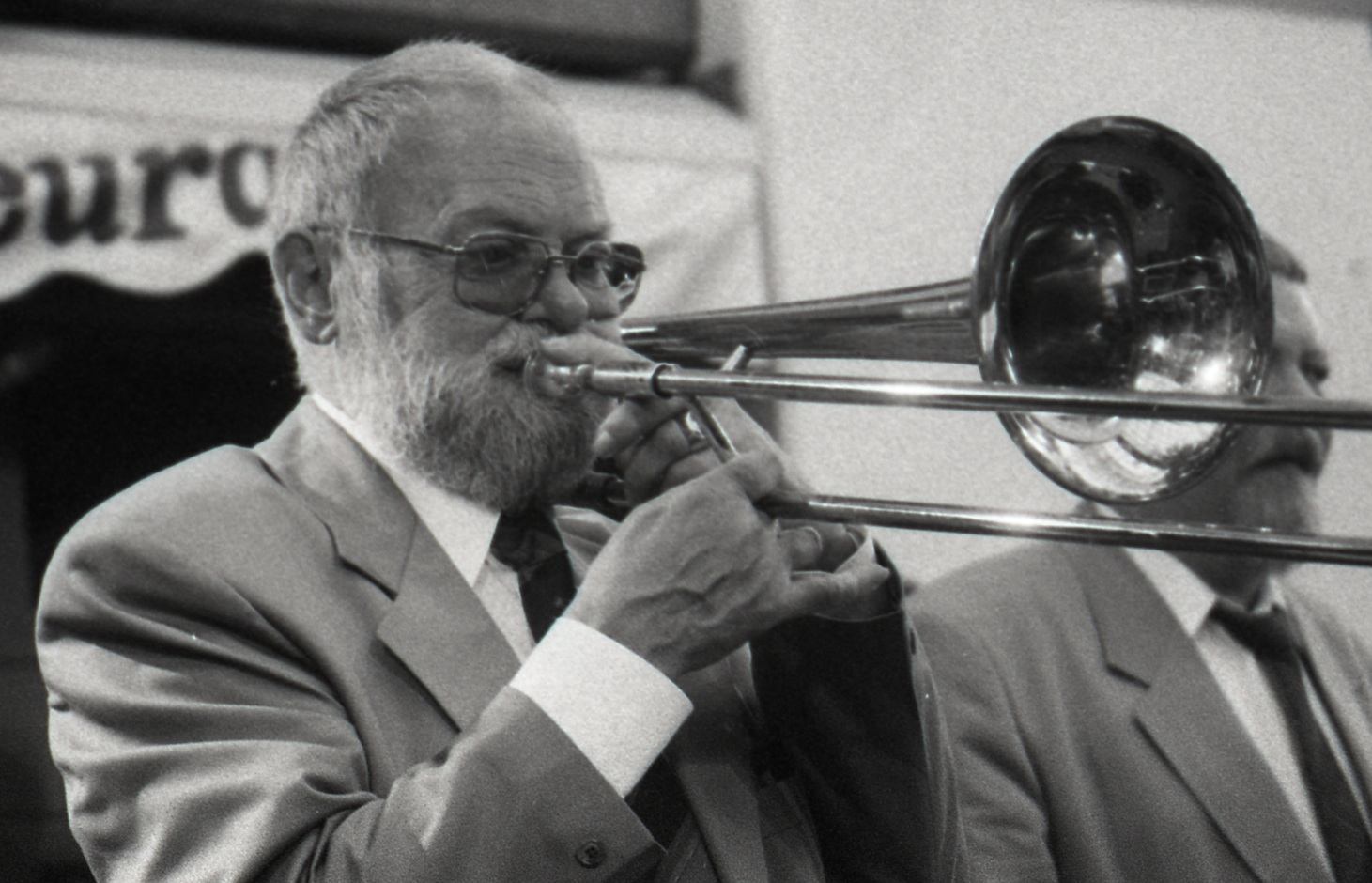

Background information
- Birth name: Arne Bue Jensen
- Born: 8 May 1930; Copenhagen, Denmark
- Died: 2 November 2011 (aged 81); Copenhagen, Denmark
- Genres: Jazz, Dixieland revival
- Occupation: Musician
- Instrument: Trombone
- Years active: 1949–2011
- Labels: Storyville, Timeless, Music Mecca

Arne "Papa" Bue Jensen (8 May 1930 – 2 November 2011), known as Papa Bue, was a Danish trombonist and bandleader, chiefly associated with the Dixieland jazz revival style of which he was considered an important proponent. He founded and led the Papa Bues Viking Jazzband, which was active from 1956.

== Biography ==
=== Early life and career ===
Arne Bue Jensen was born in Copenhagen, Denmark. At an early age, he became fascinated with jazz, prompted by a pile of records from his brother that included Harry James, Artie Shaw, Tommy Dorsey, Glenn Miller and Bert Ambrose. Bunk Johnson and George E. Lewis made a strong impression.

After World War II, Jensen became a sailor, visiting ports around the world. It was around this time that he started to play jazz. He bought a slide trombone with money he borrowed, which would take him years to repay. A musician from the Royal Danish Orchestra taught him some basics, but otherwise he was self-taught. He played in Copenhagen clubs with other young musicians and bands, including the Royal Jazzman (later the Bohana Jazz Band), Henrik Johansen's Jazz Band, and the Saint Peter Street Stompers, participating as a sideman in several recordings. In the 1950s, Papa Bue worked with the Bonanza Jazz Band, Chris Barber, Adrian Bentzon, and Henrik Johansen.

=== Viking Jazz Band ===
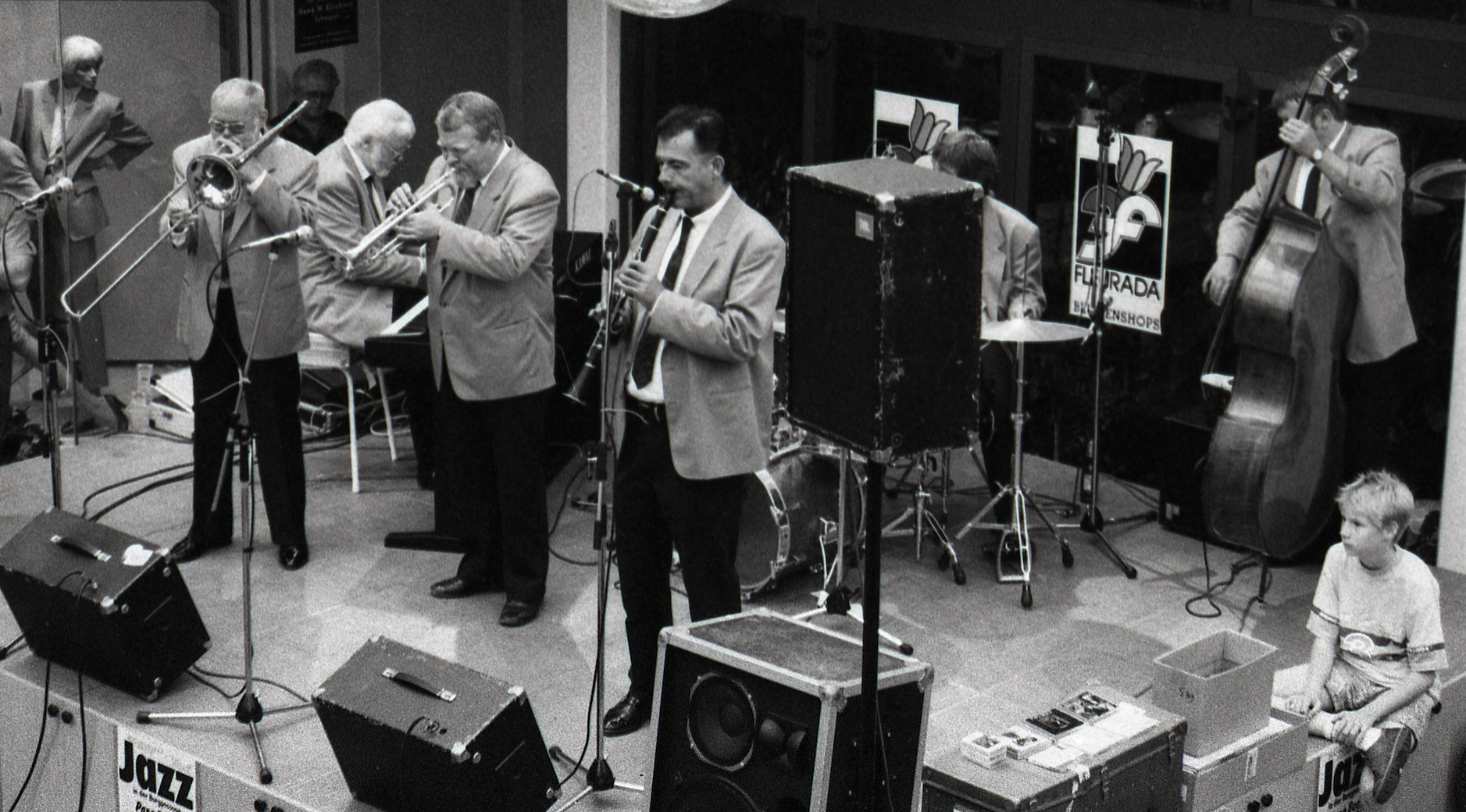
Papa Bue's Viking Jazz Band performing in Braunschweig, 7 July 1992

In the mid 1950s, he was part of the entertainment district in Nyhavn. He performed with other young jazz musicians in various informal arrangements. With six musicians he founded the New Orleans Jazz Band in 1956, after a jam session at Cap Horn. Since Jensen was the eldest, he became the bandleader. Given that he was the only band member who was a father, he was given the nickname "Papa Bue".

In late 1957, Jensen renamed the ensemble the Viking Jazz Band. The name came from American journalist and vocalist Shel Silverstein who attended one of their concerts at Cap Horn during a stay in Copenhagen. He subsequently wrote an article about them, calling them the Danish Vikings, explaining that they played original New Orleans and Chicago jazz better than any American band at the time. The band adopted the new name and released their first album as the Viking Jazz Band in 1958. In 1960 their "Schlafe, mein Prinzchen" sold over one million copies, and was awarded a Gold Disc.

At a time when many jazz musicians worked in the Bebop idiom, Bue's style remained based on the Dixieland tradition but also with influences from early swing music. He is considered one of the most significant proponents of his genre.

The group remained active into the 1990s, and recorded with musicians such as George Lewis (1959), Champion Jack Dupree (1962), Art Hodes (1970), Wild Bill Davison (1970, 1974), Wingy Manone, Edmond Hall and Albert Nicholas. They also played with George Lewis, Earl Hines, Stuff Smith, Ben Webster. Wild Bill Davison was a permanent band member. It was Papa Bue's Viking Jazz Band which recorded Bent Fabricius-Bjerre's theme music for the Olsen Gang series, now a legendary sequence for the Danes. Jensen released a large number of albums, many of them issued or reissued on Storyville Records, Timeless Records, and Music Mecca.

== Awards and honors ==
In 1969, Papa Bue's Viking Jazz Band was the only non-American band to participate in the New Orleans Jazz Festival and Jensen was honored with the "Golden Keys to the City".

In 1989 he received the Ben Webster's Prize of Honour.

== Death ==
Papa Bue died in Copenhagen on 2 November 2011, at the age of 81.

== Discography ==
- A Tribute to Wingy Manone (Recorded 7 December 1967, Storyville)
- All That Meat and No Potatoes (With Wild Bill Davison & Gustav Winkler, Rec. Nov 1977, Storyville)
- The 25th Anniversary Session (Rec. 1981, V-KING)
- Live in Tivoli at Jazzhus Slukefter (1982, V-King Records – VLP-102, Rec. live Jazzhus Slukefter Tivoli Gardens, Copenhagen)
- Everybody Loves Saturday Night, Vol. 1 (compilation, released 5 December 1996)
- Song Was Born (released 20 September 1999)
- 40 Years Jubilee Concert (released 20 September 1989)
- Canal Street Blues (released 20 September 1999)
- Church Concert (live recording, released 1 January 2000)
- Live at Mosebacke Stockholm (live recordings from 1970, released 14 November 2000)
- 1958–1969: Hit Singles (compilation, released 1 May 2001)
- 1971: Live in Dresden (live recordings from 1971, released 10 July 2001)
- Rags & Marches (compilation, released 5 March 2002)
- Hamburg 1970–1971: A Tribute to Finn Otto Hansen (compilation, released 6 July)
- Papa Bue Discography by Gerard Bielderman a.o. [Eurojazz Discos No. 19 – 2013]
