= Leo Mathisen =

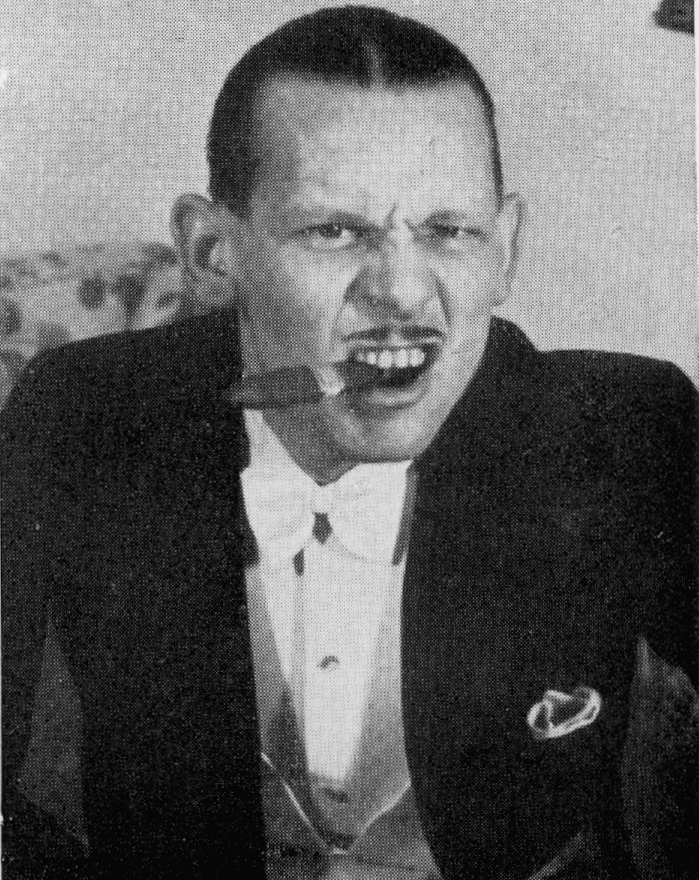

Background information
- Also known as: The Lion
- Born: Hans Leo Mathiassen; 10 October 1906; Copenhagen, Denmark
- Died: 16 December 1969 (aged 63) Ballerup, Denmark
- Genre: Jazz
- Occupations: Musician, composer, bandleader
- Instruments: Piano, vocals
- Years active: 1927 – 1953

Leo "The Lion" Mathisen (10 October 1906 – 16 December 1969) was a Danish jazz pianist, composer, arranger, singer and bandleader. He was a leading figure of the thriving Danish scene during the years around World War II—a period which has been labelled the Golden Age of Danish Jazz—and he is considered to be one of the most significant and original jazz musicians of his day.

Mathisen's main source of inspiration was Fats Waller, both his piano play and his singing, but the later years of his career saw some bebop influence. His most famous tracks are "Take It Easy" and "To Be or Not to Be". His nickname is a reference to his first name as well as MGM's mascot Leo the Lion. He is also remembered for his characteristic appearance with his flat, centrally parted hair, his thin moustache and, most notably, his fondness of large cigars.

== Biography ==
=== Early life and career ===
Leo Mathisen was born in Copenhagen in 1906. He worked in a record shop, listened to records and tried to copy the virtuosic piano playing that he heard. After completing a merchant education, he started working professionally as a pianist in restaurant Arena and with Kai Ewans' band in Restaurant Adlon. The same year he also recorded his first album, The More We Are Together, in collaboration with Victor Cornelius. From 1927 to 1928 he was also part of a trio with Otto Lington and Anker Skjoldborg.

From 1928 through 1931 he performed with Adrian Rollini's orchestra Germany and Sweden and with Max Lefkos' band in Germany and Sweden.

=== With own bands ===
In 1936 Mathisen formed his own band and until 1952 he led various acclaimed orchestras which performed in restaurants in Copenhagen and toured in Scandinavia after the end of World War II also in Germany. They also served as backup bands for various popular singers.

Among the members of his band were Erik Parker, Henry Hagemann and John Steffensen, while the trumpeter Jørgen Ryg joined the ensemble in the years after the war. During the war, a time which has been labelled as the Golden Age of Danish Jazz, he reached huge popularity, particularly at the München establishment where he performed regularly for several years during the Occupation of Denmark. When he was forbidden to perform in English, he resorted to scat singing with a distinctive Copenhagen-English sound.

From 1951 he performed as a solo pianist around Denmark, but in spring 1953 he retired from music altogether due to health problems. He died in 1969 and is interred on the Mariebjerg Cemetery in Gentofte in the northern outskirts of Copenhagen.

== Works ==
Mathisen recorded numerous albums with his band, often with his own compositions. His main source of inspiration was Fats Waller, both in his piano playing and in his singing, and particularly his recordings from 1941 to 1943 are considered to be among the swing music's finest. His most famous songs are "Take It Easy" and "To Be or Not to Be". With larger orchestras he recorded tracks such as "Long Shadows", which is a typical example of his original arrangements. In 1952 he retired from music due to health problems.

Mathisen also recorded popular hits of his time such as Lionel Hampton's "Hey! Ba-Ba-Re-Bop", "Five Minutes More", "Near Yo" and "Makin' Whoopee". With Erik Parkerm he also created Danish lyrics to songs such as De 24 Røvere that Fats Waller recorded in 1941 and Jack McVea's "The Key's in the Mailbox".

== In films ==
Leo Mathisen appears as himself in the films 5 raske piger ("Five Lively Girls", 1933), 7-9-13 (1934), Mit liv er musik ("My Life is Music", 1944) and Teatertosset ("Theatre Buff", 1944).

His music is featured in the films Der var engang en krig ("There Was Once a War", 1966), Midt i en jazztid ("In the Midst of the Jazz Age", 1969) and I Tvillingernes tegn ("In the Sign of Gemini", 1975).

He is also the subject of the biographical 1986 film Take it Easy, in which he is played by Eddie Skoller.

He is also mentioned in Episode 5 of the Danish series Matador as an up-and-coming pianist.
