= Bernhard Christensen =

Danish musician

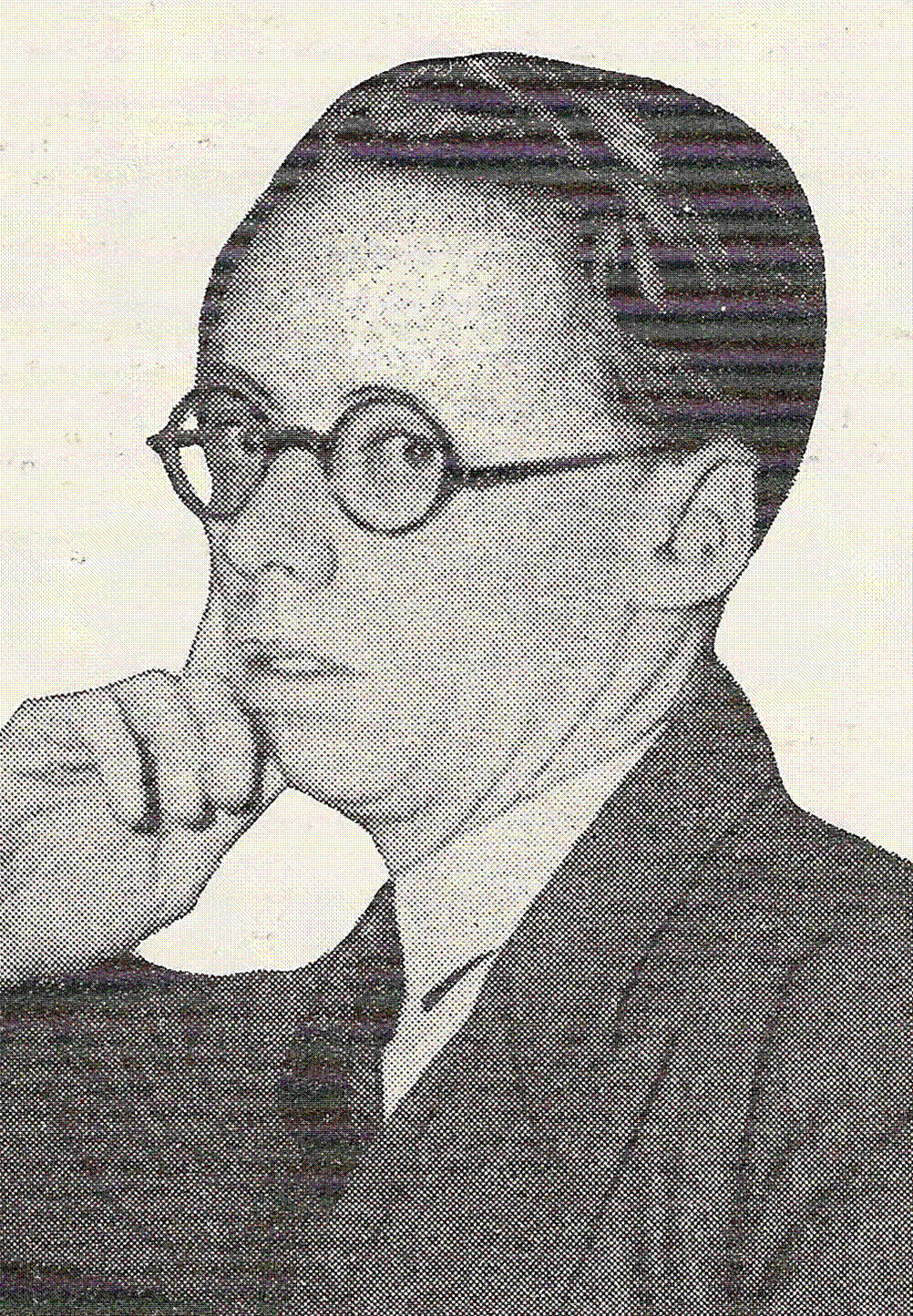

Bernhard Christensen (9 March 1906 – 20 March 2004) was a Danish composer and organist.

He was born in Copenhagen and studied music at University of Copenhagen from 1926. In 1929 he graduated and was organist until 1945 at Christiansborg Palace Church. Then he was hired as organist by Vangede Church from 1945 to 1976. He also worked as a music teacher from 1950 to 1976, notably for young jazz enthusiasts in a kindergarten.

One of his compositions was a Jazz oratory called De 24 hours.

He composed the music for the 1935 landmark Danish documentary 'Danmark'.
