= Erling Kroner =

Danish jazz musician (1943–2011)

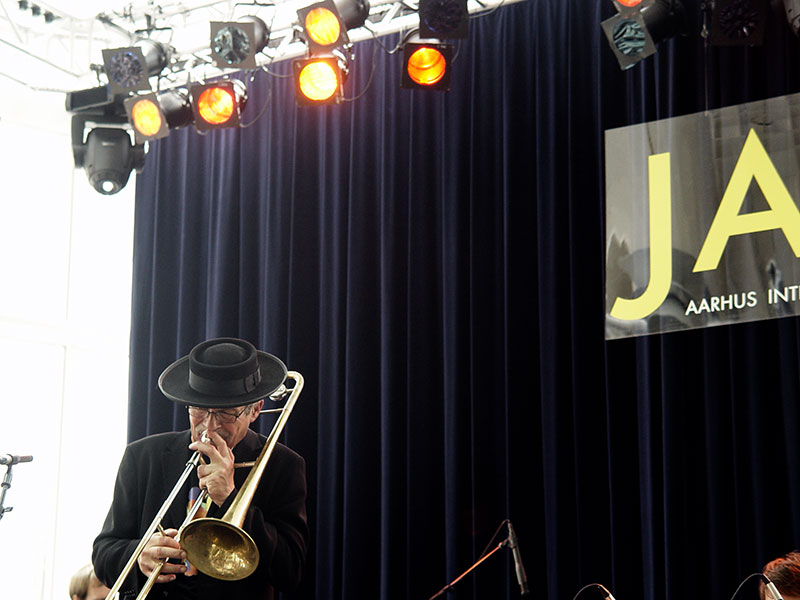
Erling Kroner at Aarhus Jazz Festival in 2009.

Erling Kroner (16 April 1943 – 2 March 2011) was a Danish jazz trombonist and bandleader.

Kroner was born in Copenhagen, Denmark, but gained music education at Berklee College of Music in Boston during 1969–70 and 1973–74, though he played professionally as early as 1961, amongst others in Germany in the Dixieland Stompers. Kroner shortly after played avantgarde music, with saxophonist John Tchicai, and rock in Melvis & His Gentlemen. Beginning in 1967 Kroner played formed his own group, which remained in existence for the rest of his life, and which primarily was a quintet or tentet.

During the 1970s Kroner played in NDR's Big Band in Hamburg. From 1973 to 1986, Kroner was also a member of the DR Big Band and played in Leif Johanssons orchestra and Lasse Beijboms band – White Orange. From mid-1990s he was bandleader of a big orchestra together with Lasse Beijbom – The Beijbom-Kroner Big Band. In 2004 Kroner and the American baritone saxophonist Ed Epstein formed the band Bari-Bone Connection, who recorded the album Bari My Heart.

Erling Kroner died at his home in Copenhagen on 2 March 2011 surrounded by family after suffering from cancer for an extended period.

== Discography ==
- The Forgotten Art (1977)
- Erling Kroner Tentet – Entre Dos Cielos (1982)
- Erling Kroner en Buernos Aires (1991)
- Erling Kroner Dark Side Orchestra (1992)
- Beijbom / Kroner Big Band – Opposites Attract (1997)
- Erling Kroner Dream Quintet – Ahi va el negro (1998)
- Erling Kroner Dream Quintet – Trombomissimo (1999)
- Beijbom / Kroner Big Band – Tango for Bad People (2004)
- Erling Kroner New Music Orchestra – Tango Jalousie and all that Jazz (2005)
- Erling Kroner New Music Orchestra – The Mariposa Project – Live on Jazzhouse (2007)
- Erling Kroner New Music Orchestra – EKNMO B3 (2008)
- The Epstein – Kroner Bari Bone Connection – Bari My Heart (2008)
