= Rhythmic Music Conservatory =

Coordinates: 55°40′57″N 12°36′24″E

The Rhythmic Music Conservatory (Danish: Rytmisk Musikkonservatorium) is a music conservatoire in Copenhagen, Denmark. The RMC was founded in 1986 as an independent institution of higher education under the Danish Ministry of Culture and is the only school in Denmark specializing in contemporary music training programmes.

In 2005, it appointed British musician and composer Django Bates as Professor of Rhythmic Music.
