= Jacob Fischer =

Danish jazz guitarist

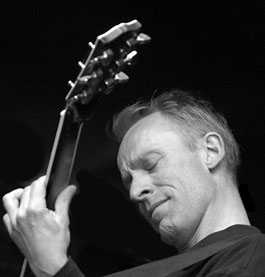
- Jacob Fischer

Background information
- Born: 1967
- Genres: Jazz
- Occupation: Musician
- Instrument: Guitar
- Website: Official site

Jacob Fischer (born 1967) is a self-taught Danish jazz guitarist. Since 1992 he has been a member of the Svend Asmussen Quartet and founded the Jacob Fischer Trio, where he plays alongside Hugo Rasmussen on bass and Janus Templeton on drums. He is a member of Christina von Bülow's trio and the Kristian Jørgensens Quartet.

== Biography ==
He had an engagement at the jazz club Jazzhus Montmartre in Copenhagen.

In 1992 he became a member of Svend Asmussen quartet. Since then he has played in numerous ensembles and with Allan Botschinsky, Jesper Thilo, Finn Ziegler, Bob Rockwell, and Radioens Big Band. He formed duos with guitarist Doug Raney and bassists Hugo Rasmussen and Mads Vinding. He has also played with Toots Thielemans, Art Farmer, Lee Konitz, Gary Bartz, John Abercrombie, Scott Hamilton, Adam Nussbaum, Putte Wickman, Jan Allan, and Jerry Bergonzi.

== Awards ==
- 1992 JASA-prisen
- 1987 Sørens Penge
- 1996 Ben Webster Prize
- 1998 Palæbars jazzpris
- DjangodOr
- 2003 Jazzpris Silkeborg

== Discography ==
- Playing in the Breeze with Thomas Fryland, Jesper Lundgaard (Music Partner, 1995)
- Fine Together with Anders Lindskog, Jesper Lundgaard (Touche, 1999)
- Over the Rainbow with Mads Vinding (Cope, 2002)
- Jacob Fischer Trio feat. Svend Asmussen, (Gateway, 2008)
- Blues (Gateway, 2010)
- Guitarist (Arbors, 2011)
- My Romance: Tribute to Bill Evans (Venus, 2013)
- ... In New York City (Arbors, 2015)

=== As sideman ===
With Chris Potter

- This Will Be (Storyville, 2001)

== See also ==
- Danish jazz
