= Tomas Franck =

Swedish saxophonist

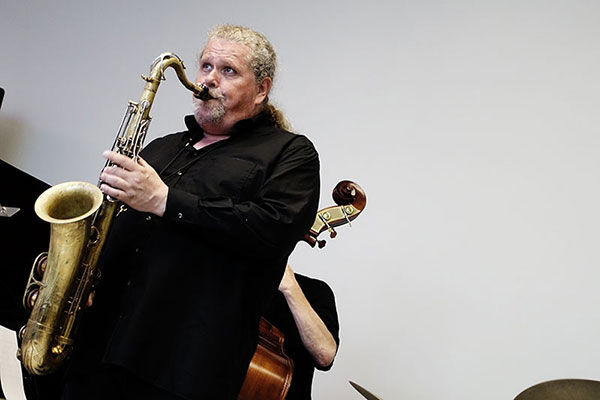
Tomas Franck (Aarhus Jazz Festival 2015)

Tomas Bengt Erik Franck (born October 14, 1958 in Ängelholm) is a Swedish jazz tenor saxophonist.

Franck was raised in the town of Helsingborg, where he took up clarinet as a youth, switching to tenor sax in his teens. He studied at the Musik-högskolan in Malmö in the early 1980s, where he formed a group called Equinox and performed with Peps Persson; starting in 1982, he began playing with Fredrik Norén, an association that would last until 1986. In the 1990s he worked with the Radioens Big Band and was the recipient of the Ben Webster Prize in 1991.

Franck has performed and recorded extensively as a sideman with, among others, Nikolaj Bent-zon, Ben Besiakov, Thomas Blachman, Thomas Clausen, Carsten Dahl, Niels Lan Doky, Billy Drummond, Al Foster, Lennart Ginman, Roy Haynes, Kirk Lightsey, Doug Raney, and Jens Winther.

== Discography ==
As leader/co-leader

- Bewitched (Stunt, 1989)
- Tomas Franck In New York (Criss Cross, 1992)
- At The Circus (Stunt, 2001)
- The Copenhagen Connection - Montmartre Revisited (Stunt, 2006)
- Association (Storyville, 2015)
