= Ben Webster Prize =

Annual jazz award

Ben Webster

The Ben Webster Prize is an annual jazz award set up by the Ben Webster Foundation to honour Danish and American jazz musicians as well as other professionals active in the promotion of jazz in those countries. The American jazz musician Ben Webster spent his last ten years in Copenhagen, Denmark, where he became an active part of the city's thriving jazz scene. After his death, the Ben Webster Foundation was set up to channel his annual royalties to musicians in Denmark and America. The Ben Webster Prize is part of this effort.

The prize is handed out at an award ceremony in connection with a special concert which has taken place at various jazz venues, including the Jazzhus Montmartre, Huset, the Lake Pavilion, Copenhagen Jazzhouse, the Queen's Hall at the Royal Danish Library, Freetown Christiania's Jazzklub, Sofies Kælderen and Tivoli Gardens. The winner currently receives DKK 30.000.

== Winners ==
Year	Recipient	Instrument
1977	Jesper Thilo	Saxophones, clarinet
1978	Simon Spang-Hansen	Saxophone
1979	Erling Kroner	trombone
1980	Ole Molin	Guitar
1981	Ernie Wilkins	Arranger, bandleader
1982	Jesper Lundgaard; Mads Vinding	Double bass Double bass
1983	Marilyn Mazur; Bent Jædig	Percussion; Saxophone
1984	Allan Botschinsky	Trumpet
1985	Jørgen Emborg; Cæcilie Norby	Piano; Vocalist
1986	Ole Kock Hansen	Piano
1987	Jens Winther	Trumpet
1988	Doug Raney	Guitar
1989	Thomas Clausen	Piano
1990	Ben Besiakov	Piano
1991	Jonas Johansen; Tomas Franck	Drums; Saxophone
1992	Søren Kristiansen	Piano
1993	Kristian Jørgensen; Finn Ziegler	Violin; Violin
1994	Niels Jørgen Steen; Christina Nielsen	Piano, arranger Saxophone
1995	Henrik Bolberg	Trumpet
1996	Jacob Fischer	Guitar
1997	Svend-Erik Nørregaard; Carsten Dahl	Drums; Piano
1998	Benita Haastrup; Thomas Fryland	Drums; Trumpet
1999 (90 Years Honorary Prize)	Alex Riel; Niels-Henning Ørsted Pedersen; Olivier Antunes	Drums; Double bass Piano
2000	Horace Parlan	Piano
2001	Pernille Bevort; Per Møller Hansen	Saxophone; Television producer
2002	Christina von Bülow; Jens Klüver	Saxophone; Bandleader
2003	Bob Rockwell	Tenor saxophone
2004	Jan Persson	jazz photographer
2005	Jan zum Vohrde	Alto saxophone, flute
2006	Morten Lund	Drums
2007	Fredrik Lundin	Saxophone
2008	Niels Lan Doky; Chris Minh Doky	Piano; Double bass
2009	Lennart Ginman	Double bass
2010	Kresten Osgood	Drums
2011	Bo Stief	Double bass
2012	Jan Kaspersen	Piano, Bandleader
2013	Jacob Christoffersen	Keyboards
2014	Sinne Eeg	Vocalist
2015	Uffe Steen	Keyboards
2016	Heine Hansen	Piano
2017	Mathias Heise	Harmonica
2018	Henrik Gunde; Jan Harbeck	Piano; Tenor saxophone
2019	Kasper Tranberg	Trumpet
2020	Frands Rifbjerg	Drums
2021	Anders "AC" Christensen Thomas Fonnesbæk	Double bass Double bass
2022	Kathrine Windfeld	Composer, piano, arranger, bandleader
2023	Zier Romme Larsen Emil de Waal	Piano Drums, bandleader
2024	Cornelia Nilsson	Drums
2025	Rasmus Sørensen Anders Mogensen	Piano Drums
2026	Lotte Anker	Saxophone

== Ben Webster's Prize of Honour ==
- 1984 - Børge Roger Henrichsen
- 1989 - Papa Bue
- 1995 - Ole Fessor Lindgreen
- 1996 - Svend Asmussen
- 2002 - Hugo Rasmussen
- 2003 - Arnvid Meyer
- 2006 - Ed Thigpen
- 2007 - Erik Moseholm
- 2009 - Lars Thorborg
- 2010 - Ray Pitts
- 2011 - Anders Stefansen
- 2012 - Klaus Albrectsen
- 2013 - Palle Mikkelborg
- 2014 - Tove Enevoldsen
- 2015 - Vincent Nilsson
- 2016 - Ole Streenberg
- 2017 - Jens Søndergaard
- 2019 - Pierre Dørge - Finn Odderskov
- 2020 - Elith "Nulle" Nykjær
- 2022 - Ann Farholt, Ole Olsen, Henrik Bay, Leonardo Pedersen, Mikkel Find, Jens Jefsen, Kjeld Lauritsen, Niels "Flipper" Stuart
- 2023 - Gorm Valentin
- 2024 - Cim Meyer and Kjeld Frandsen
- 2025 - Peter Jensen and Jens Sjølund
- 2026 - Ayi Solomon and Jens Jørgen Gjedsted

== See also ==
- Danish jazz
