= Klüvers Big Band =

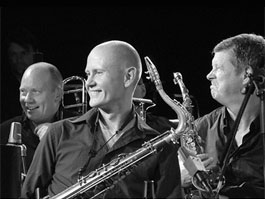

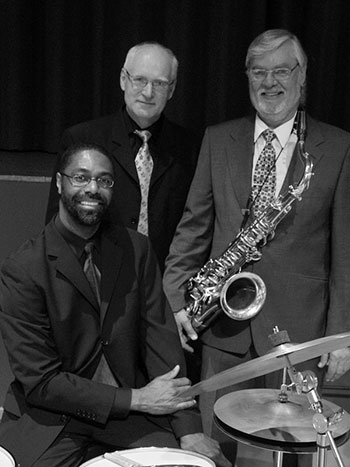
Dennis Macrel, Jens Klüver and Jesper Thilo (2009)

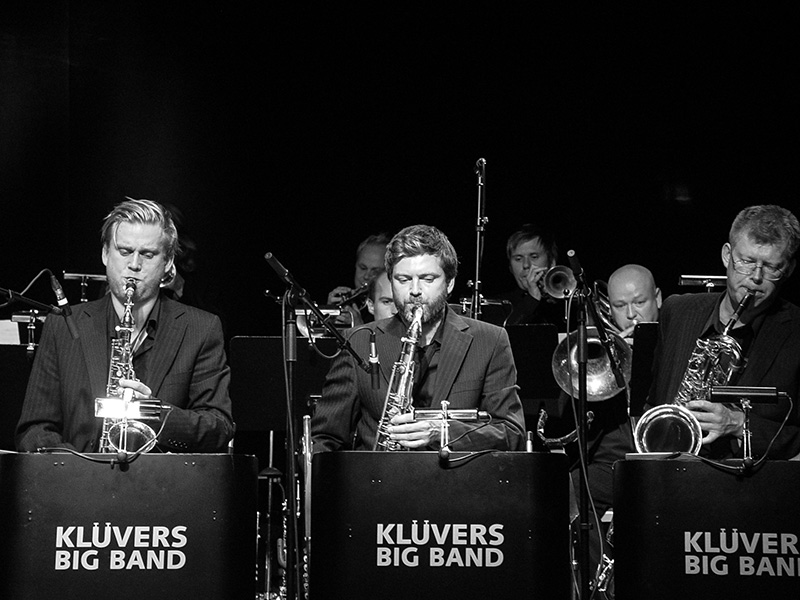
Klüvers Big Band

Klüvers Big Band is a Danish big band. It was formed in 1977 by a group of young music students under the leadership of Jens Klüver. Since then the orchestra has worked with a long line of international and Danish soloists. It has recently toured in Europe with Kurt Elling.

In 2002 Klüver received the Ben Webster Prize in recognition of his work with the big band.

In 2012 Klüver retired, handing over to Lars Møller, at which point the band was renamed the Aarhus Jazz Orchestra.

== Soloists ==
Klüvers Big Band has performed with a long line of international soloists:

- Abdullah Ibrahim, Piano
- Afonso Corea, Percussion
- Bernard Fowler, Vocal
- Bill Dobbins, Piano, Arranger
- Bill Warfield, Trumpet, Arranger
- Bob Berg, Tenor
- Bob Mintzer Tenor, Arranger
- Bob Rockwell Tenor
- Bobby Shew, Trumpet
- Butch Lacy, Piano, Arranger
- Byron Stripling, Trumpet
- Carmen Bradford Vocal
- Clark Terry Trumpet
- Dave Samuels Vibes
- Deborah Brown, Vocal
- Dee Dee Bridgewater, Vocal
- Dena DeRose Piano, Vocal
- Dennis Mackrel, Drums, Arranger - Se galleri
- Ed Neumeister Trombone, Arranger
- Ed Partyka, arranger
- Ed Thigpen, Drums
- Emanuel Rahim, Percussion
- Ernie Wilkins, Tenor, Arranger
- Fred Sturm, Arranger
- Gary Bartz, Alto
- Gregory Boyd Steel Drums & Vocal
- Harry Sweets Edison, Trumpet
- Harvey Wainapel, Alto, Tenor
- Horace Parlan, Piano, Arranger
- Jerry Bergonzi, Tenor
- Joe Henderson, Tenor
- Joe Lovano, Tenor
- John Abercrombie, Guitar
- John Surman, Soprano
- Jon Hendricks, Vocal
- Judi Silvano, Vocal
- Ken Peplowski, Clarinet, Tenor
- Kenny Werner, Piano, Arranger
- Kurt Elling, Vocal - Se galleri
- Lee Konitz, Alto
- Madeline Eastman, Vocal
- Marcio Bahia, Drums
- Mark Vinci, Alto, Arranger
- Matt Harris, Piano, Arranger
- Michael Abene, Piano, arranger
- Mike Nock, Piano, Arranger
- Mulgrew Miller, Piano
- Nicholas Urie, Arranger
- Paquito D'Rivera, Alto, Clarinet
- Pete Yellin Alto, Arranger
- Richard Boone Trombone
- Rob McConnel Arranger
- Robert Routch, French Horn
- Slide Hampton Trombone, Arranger
- Stacey Kent Vocal
- Terell Stafford, Trumpet
- Thad Jones, Arranger
- Tim Hagans, Trumpet, Arranger
- Tim Ries - Tenor, Soprano
- Tom Kirkpatrick, Trumpet
- Tommy Smith Tenor
- Vincent Herring, Alto
- Wycliffe Gordon, Trombone, Arranger

== Discography ==
Records include:

- Grew's Tune (2012; with Mulgrew Miller on piano)
- Veronica Mortensen - I'm the Girl
- Hot House - Thilo Meets Mackrel (with Danish saxophonist Jesper Thilo and American drummer and arranger Dennis Mackrel)
- Otto Brandenburg Galla Memorial (2008)
- I Had A Ball - Greatest & More (2007)
- Love Being Here
- Other People Other Plans (with Hans Ulrik as soloist and composer)
- Reflections
- Better Believe It
- Good Times
- A Tribute To Duke (1999; Vincent Herring as a guest soloist on saxophone)
- Silver Street (1998)
- Live In Tivoli (1997)
- Count On It (1995; with the vocalist Carmen Bradford)
- The Heat's On (1994; with the violinist Finn Ziegler and the saxophonist Jesper Thilo)
- Jasmine (1993)

== See also ==
- Danish jazz
