= Aura (Miles Davis album) =

Studio album by Miles Davis
- Released: September 12, 1989
- Recorded: January 31–February 4, 1985
- Studios: Easy Sound, Copenhagen, Denmark
- Genres: Jazz fusion, third stream
- Length: 66:59
- Label: Columbia
- Producer: Palle Mikkelborg

Miles Davis chronology
Amandla (1989)	Aura (1989)	First Miles (1990)

Aura is a concept album by Miles Davis, produced by Danish composer/trumpeter Palle Mikkelborg, released in 1989. All compositions and arrangements are by Mikkelborg, who created the suite in tribute when Davis received the Léonie Sonning Music Prize in December 1984, the year Decoy was released.

== Background ==
The main theme consists of 10 notes, yielded by the letters "M-I-L-E-S-D-A-V-I-S" (see BACH motif, and Schoenberg hexachord "EsCHBEG", and the chart at Musical notes#Accidentals). It is introduced at the beginning over a sustained chord of these same notes. The following 9 movements of the suite represent the colours Mikkelborg sees in Davis's aura.

The music is scored for an extended jazz big band, and the core of the band is formed by the Danish Radio Big Band, featuring Niels-Henning Ørsted Pedersen, Thomas Clausen and Marilyn Mazur. Guests such as John McLaughlin and Davis' nephew Vince Wilburn are featured. The sessions took place in Copenhagen in 1985 at Davis' own initiative, as he had been very honored and satisfied with the suite. It was the first time Miles Davis had recorded with a big band for over 20 years. Aura, however, is not a conventional big band jazz album. The music is perhaps best categorized as fusion jazz with a strong flavor of modern classical music, as many of the orchestral passages reveal Mikkelborg's inspiration from composers like Olivier Messiaen and Charles Ives.

Although the album was recorded at Easy Sound Studios in Copenhagen in 1985, contractual issues delayed its release until 1989. Davis claimed in September 1985 that Columbia would not release it and gave this as a reason for switching labels and signing to Warners, while Columbia itself said the problem was connected with Mikkelborg's own contracts. The album won two Grammy Awards in 1990 for Best Jazz Instrumental Performance, Big Band and Best Jazz Instrumental Performance, Soloist (On A Jazz Recording).

== Critical reception ==
Professional ratings
Review scores
Source	Rating
AllMusic	3.5/5 stars
The Encyclopedia of Popular Music	4/5 stars
Musichound Jazz: The Essential Album Guide	4/5 stars
The Penguin Guide to Jazz Recordings	4/4 stars
(The New) Rolling Stone Album Guide	4.5/5 stars

Aura was well received by music critics. AllMusic editor Thom Jurek described its music as "an amalgam of classical impressionism, European new music, jazz, rock, electronic, and other genres." He called the album Mikkelborg's "fine parting gift" for Davis and wrote, "As a tribute and separate orchestral work, it's quite moving and beautiful, full of moody interludes and evocations of nuance, color, texture, and dynamic. With Davis added, soloing in his trademark muted, rounded warmth, the music becomes almost breathtaking." Wes Long of PopMatters called Aura "ruthlessly inventive", an "ever-moody masterpiece", and "quite possibly the last monumental effort" from Davis. Fred Kaplan of New York commented that the release emerged from an era of "mechanical rut" for Davis and called Aura "a jolting synthesis of jazz, rock, and Messiaen-influenced classical music that lit up a future path lamentably unfollowed."

Todd S. Jenkins of All About Jazz commented that the album "successfully blends Miles’ electric style with the feel of his earlier big-band works with Gil Evans, another of Mikkelborg’s prime inspirations." He wrote in conclusion, "Mikkelborg’s work offered Miles the chance to touch once more upon many of the phases his career had touched and then sailed past. If any post-Bitches Brew album by Miles should be considered essential, this is the one. Pure magic from beginning to end." In Christgau's Record Guide: The '80s (1990), music critic Robert Christgau cited it as Davis' best release during the 1980s. In (The New) Rolling Stone Album Guide (2004), music journalist Paul Evans called Aura "an adventurous and pointedly non-pop-oriented big-band suite".

== Track listing ==
All tracks composed and arranged by Palle Mikkelborg

1. "Intro" – 4:48
2. "White" – 6:07
3. "Yellow" – 6:55
4. "Orange" – 8:41
5. "Red" – 6:05
6. "Green" – 8:13
7. "Blue" – 6:36
8. "Electric Red" – 4:19
9. "Indigo" – 6:06
10. "Violet" – 9:04

== Personnel ==
- Trumpet: Miles Davis
- Trumpets and flugelhorns: Benny Rosenfeld, Idrees Sulieman, Jens Winther, Palle Bolvig, Perry Knudsen, Palle Mikkelborg
- Trombones: Jens Engel, Ture Larsen, Vincent Nilsson
- Bass trombone: Ole Kurt Jensen
- Bass trombone, tuba: Axel Windfeld
- Saxophones and woodwinds: Bent Jædig, Flemming Madsen, Jesper Thilo, Per Carsten, Uffe Karskov
- Oboe and English horn: Niels Eje
- Keyboards: Kenneth Knudsen, Ole Kock Hansen, Thomas Clausen
- Guitars: Bjarne Roupé, John McLaughlin
- Bass: Niels-Henning Ørsted Pedersen
- Fender bass and fretless bass: Bo Stief
- Drums: Lennart Gruvstedt
- Electronic drums: Vincent Wilburn Jr.
- Percussion: Ethan Weisgaard, Marilyn Mazur
- Harp: Lillian Thornquist
- Vocals: Eva Hess-Thaysen

== Production ==
- Producer: Palle Mikkelborg
- Engineers: Henrik Lund, Niels Erik Land
- Art Direction: Stacy Drummond
- Photography: Gilles Larrain
