= Benita Haastrup =

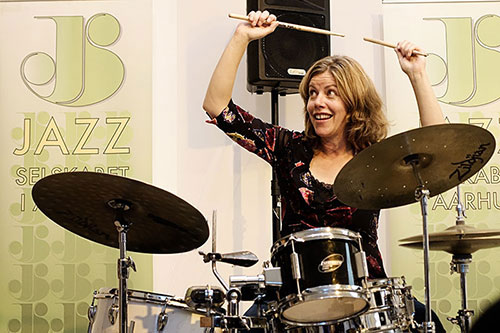
Benita Haastrup (2015) in Aarhus, Denmark

Benita Haastrup (born 1964) is a drummer, percussionist, educator and composer in Denmark.

== Life and career ==
She studied at the Rhythmic Music Conservatory in Copenhagen, graduating in 1992. In 1998, she received the Ben Webster Prize. ,

Haastrup has been a member of Marilyn Mazur's Percussion Paradise and of the all-female jazz group Sophisticated Ladies. She has also performed with Richard B. Boone, Idrees Sulieman, Johnny Griffin, Muhal Richard Abrams, Duke Jordan, Bent Jædig, John Tchicai, Fred Hopkins and Jesper Thilo, among others. She has performed in the United States, China, Africa and throughout most of Europe.

Haastrup teaches at the Rhythmic Music Conservatory.
