= Atilla Engin =

Turkish-American musician (1946–2019)

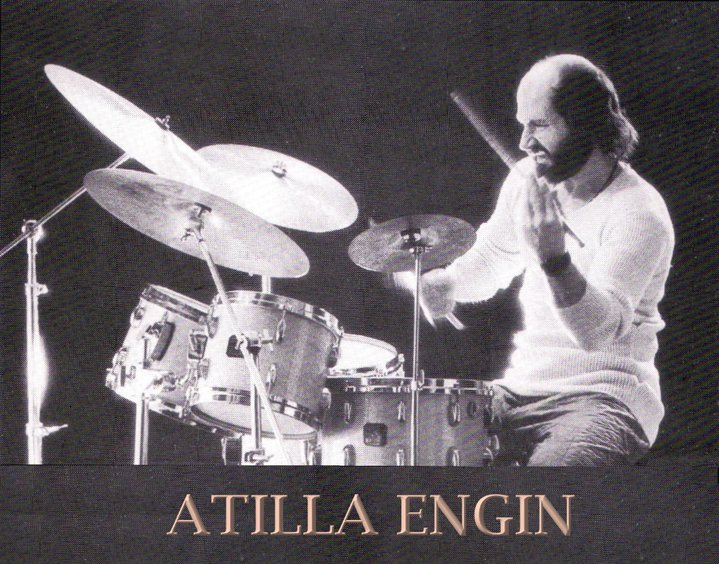

Background information
- Born: 1946; Kayseri, Turkey
- Died: 2 November 2019 Paranaguá, Brazil
- Genres: Jazz, jazz fusion, jazz rock, world music
- Occupations: Musician, composer, educator
- Instruments: Drums, percussion
- Years active: 1966–2010
- Formerly of: Istanbul Orchestra, Turquoise, Matao, New World Orchestra
- Website: atillaengin.com

Atilla Engin (1946–2019) was a Turkish American fusion jazz drummer. From 1974 to 2001 he was active in Denmark as a musician and educator; he organized music festivals and represented Denmark as a musical ambassador. In 2001, he left Denmark for the United States, where he formed an orchestra.

== Biography ==
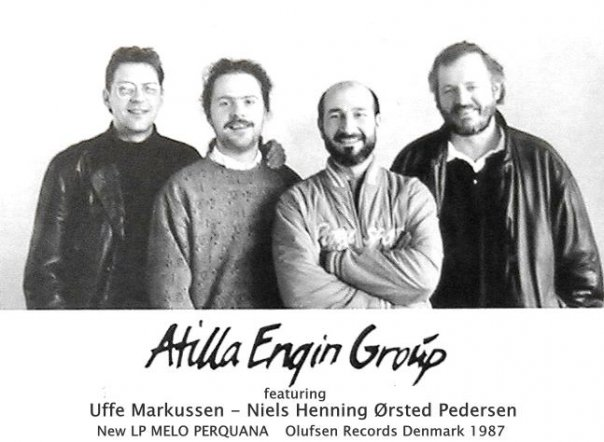
Atilla Engin Group: Atilla Engin, Niels-Henning Ørsted Pedersen, Uffe Markussen 1987

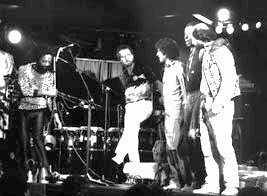
World to World Festival 1986. Left to right: Nana Vasconcelos, Birger Sulsbruck, Zakir Hussain, Ahmadu Jarr, and Atilla at the end of Jazzhus Montmartre show.

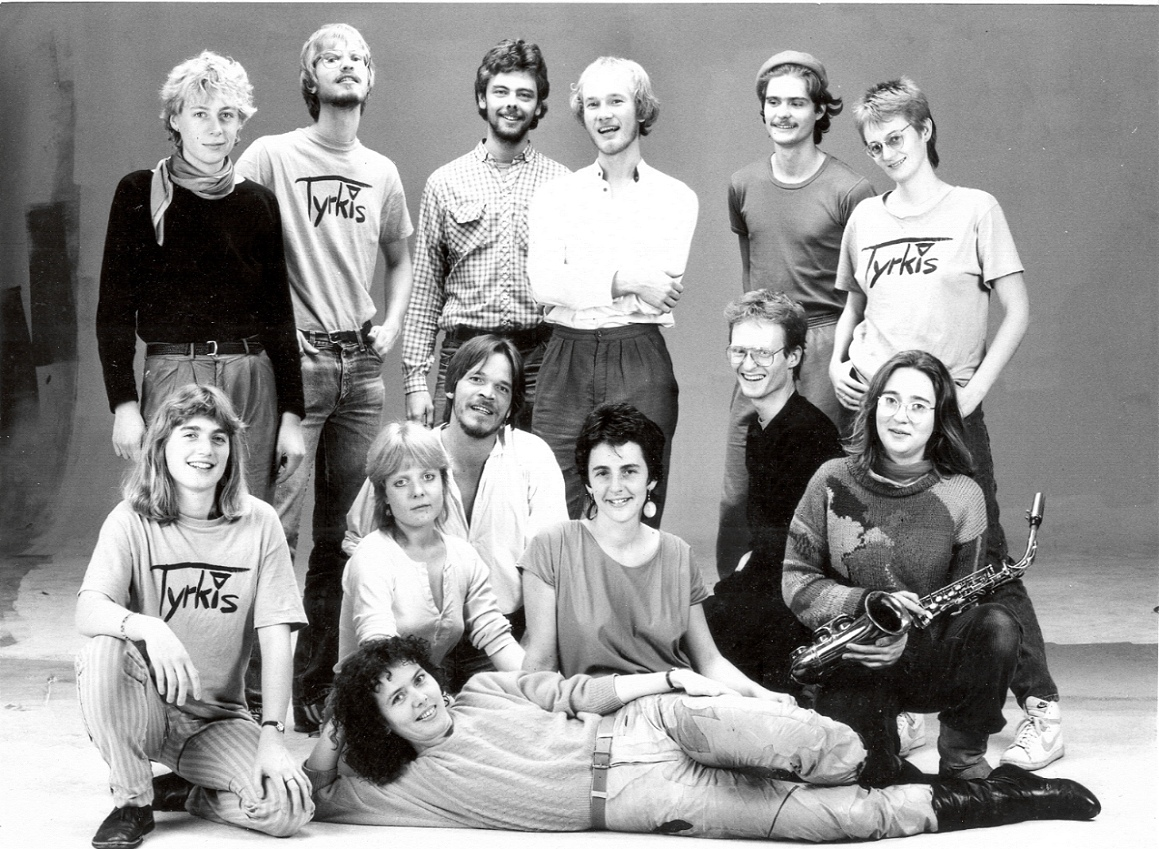
Tyrkis 1987

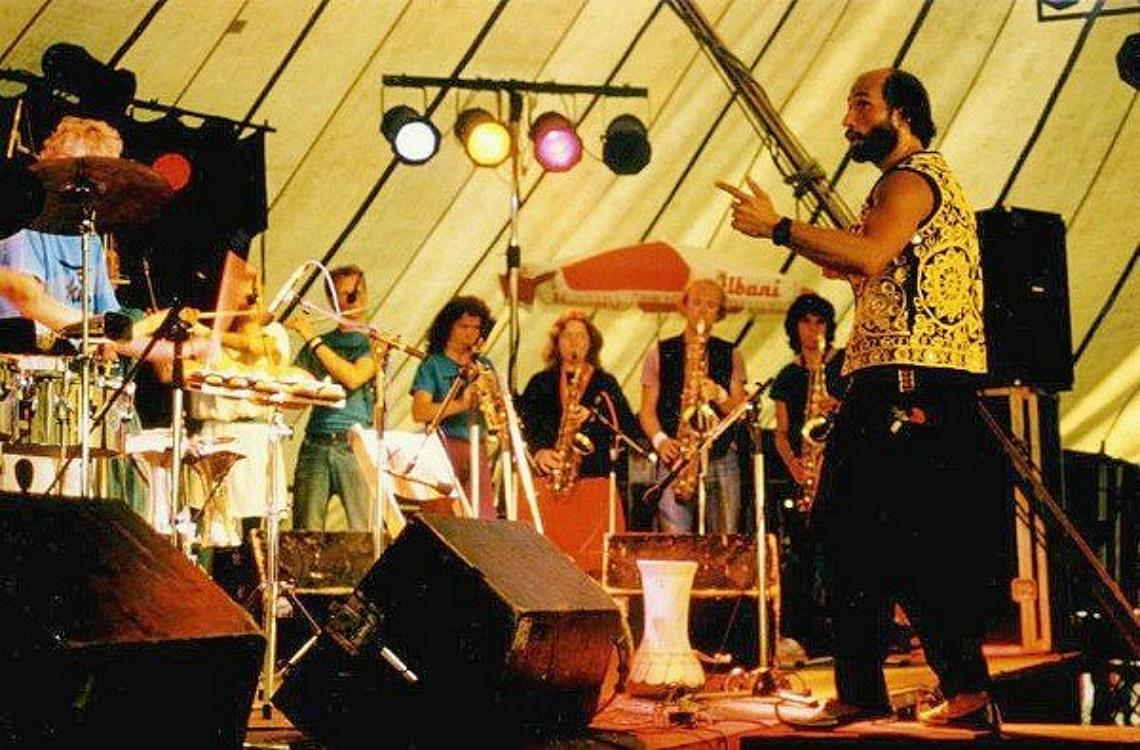
Tyrkis at the Midtfyns Festival Denmark 1987

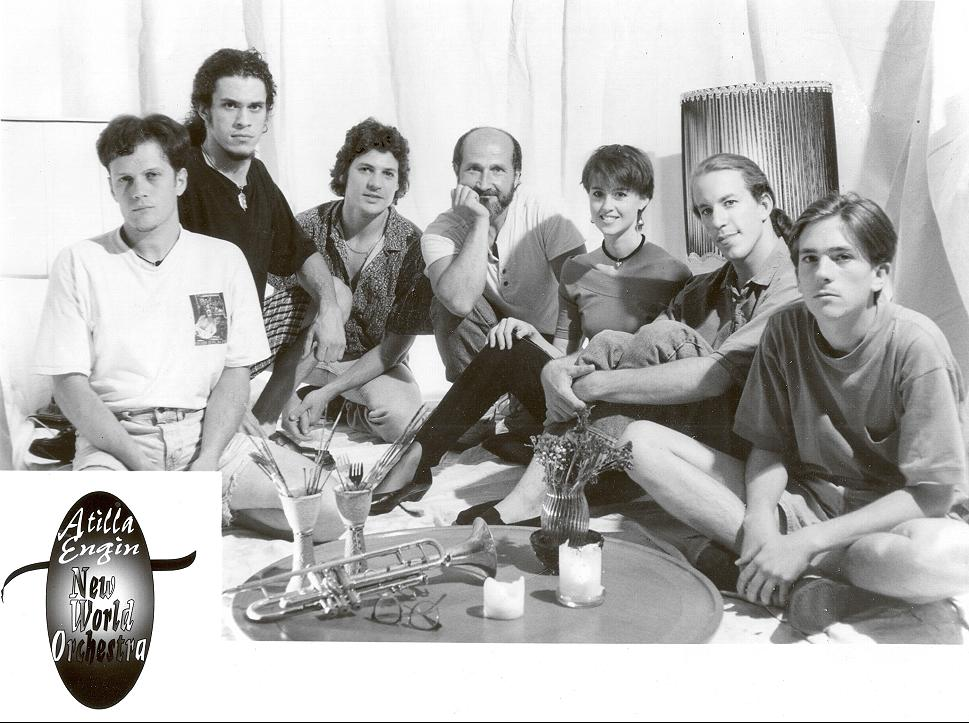

Engin first played and recorded in Istanbul, moving to Copenhagen in 1974, and playing with several groups. He released his first album Turkish Delight with the band Matao. They performed at Roskilde Festival in 1979. His other group, Atilla Engin Group, released five albums. While he was recording and touring with his band, he taught at the Copenhagen Jazz Conservatory for four years. Engin formed a band with 12 Copenhagen Jazz Conservatory students and they toured Turkey.

In 1985 Engin was awarded Composer of the Year in Denmark. In the same year, the Atilla Engin Group was appointed Denmark's cultural ambassador to represent the country in conjunction with the European Music Year 1985.

Engin established the World to World Drums and Percussion Festival in Copenhagen with events taking place in Aarhus and Malmö, Sweden. The festival included performances by Zakir Hussain, Airto Moreira, Nana Vasconcelos, Peter Giger, and Danny Gottlieb. He participated in Tal Vadhya Utsav in India.

He taught an evening class of 16 young musicians at the Rhythmic Evening School in Copenhagen in 1984, turning them into a band named Tyrkis which performed at Jazzhus Montmartre in Copenhagen. In 1987, Tyrkis won first prize at the Dortmunder Big Band Festival in Germany and released an album, My Little Chinese Love.

He left Denmark in 1989 for New York and formed the New World Orchestra and a six-piece group, Turquoise. Engin left the US for Brazil in 2005.

In 2010 he was diagnosed with cerebral haemorrhage, and sat in a wheelchair unable to speak. Atilla Engin died in Brazil the 2nd November 2019.

== His bands ==
=== Copenhagen 1977–89 ===
MATAO 1977–81
- Atilla Engin – Drums & Perc., comp. & arranger
- Svend Staal Larsen – Guitar
- Torben Gronning – Bass
- Alan Stade – Keyboards

Atilla Engin Group 1981–89
- Atilla Engin – Drums & Perc., comp., arranger
- Svend Staal Larsen – Guitar
- Mehmet Ozan, Percussion
- Okay Temiz, Percussion – Featured
- Arto Tunçboyaciyan, Perc., voices – Featured
- Ole Matthissen, Piano, synth
- Niels-Henning Ørsted Pedersen, Bass – Feat.
- Hugo Rasmussen, Bass
- Jens Jefsen, Bass
- Niels Praestholm, Bass
- Jens Melgaard, Bass
- Ole Thøer Nielsen, Alto sax, flute
- Simon Cato Spang Hansen, Tenor & Sopr. sax
- Uffe Markussen, Tenor sax – Featured
- Jens Winther Trumpet
- Birgitte Møller, Tenor sax, voices

=== New York 1992–2002 ===
New World Orchestra 1992–95
- Atilla Engin – Percussion, composer & arranger
- Ted 'Mino'Gori – Drums
- Scott Brass – Bass
- Ray Ippolito – Guitar
- Todd Billingley – Keyboard
- Todd Horton – trumpet
- Patricia (Englert) Julien – Flute
- Atilla's US Première in 1993
- At Carnegie Hall (Weill Recital Hall)

Turquoise 1996–99
- Atilla Engin – Djembe Drums, Perc., comp., arr.
- Ray Ippolito – Guitar
- Stephan Crump – Bass
- Adam Klipple – Keyboards
- Erik Lawrence – Alto sax
- Dan Jordan – Tenor sax, Sopr. sax, Flute
- Gilad – Percussion

The Istanbul Orchestra 2000–01
- Atilla Engin – Conductor, Perc., comp., arranger
- Aaron Comess – Drums
- Gilad – Percussion
- Frank Colon – Percussion
- Ray Ippolito – Guitar
- Stephan Crump – Bass
- Michael Wolff – Keyboards
- Rave Tesar – Keyboards
- Erik Lawrence – Alto sax
- Dan Jordan – Tenor sax, Sopr. sax, Flute
- Dan Willis – Tenor sax
- Lauren Seviyan – Baritone sax
- Frank Vacin – Baritone sax
- Eddie Henderson – Trumpet
- Chuck MacKinnon – Trumpet
- Kevin Bryan – Lead trumpet
- Todd Horton – Trumpet
- Andrew Lippman – Trombone
- Marya Lawrence – Vocals

== Discography ==
- Felek Usta (Evren, 1971)
- Kumsalda (Yonca, 1974) Vocals: Özdemir Erdoğan (Lyrics, music, arrangement, drums, piano: Atilla Engin
- Bütün İçkiler Benden Bu Gece (Yonca, 1974) Vocals: Alpay (Lyrics, music, arrangement: Atilla Engin)
- Turkish Delight, Group Matao (RA, 1979)
- Atatürk's Children and Nasrettin Hoca (Fairytale, 1980)
- Solens Børn with Ariel(19), (Pick Up, 1980)
- Nazar (Danish Music Productions, 1982)
- Memories, Atilla Engin Group (including Okay Temiz on percussion, Hugo Rasmussen on bass, Jens Winther on trumpet) (Danish Music Productions, 1984)
- Marmaris Love with Okay Temiz (Danish Music Productions, 1986)
- No Money No Honey with Arto Tunçboyacıyan) (Danish Music Productions)
- My Little Chinese Love, Tyrkis Big Band conducted by Atilla Engin (Stunt)
- Melo Perquana, Atilla Engin Group with Niels-Henning Ørsted Pedersen) (Olufsen, 1988)
- Mosaic of Anatolia, Group Turquoise (Istanbul, 1999)
- Moon Dog Girl by the Noodle Shop (John Kruth, Elliott Sharp, Atilla Engin and Jonathan Segel) (Sparkling Beatnik, 1999)
- Ocean of Emotion, The İstanbul Orchestra – Group Turquoise (2009)
