= Vincent Nilsson =

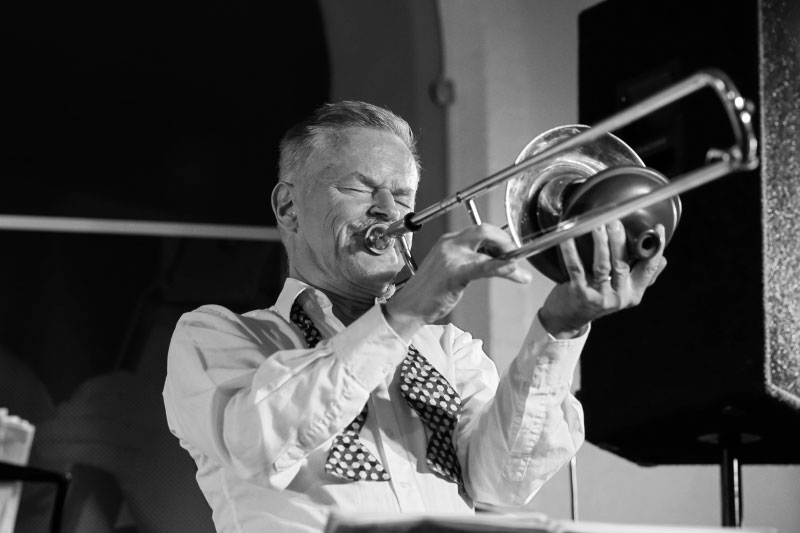
- Aarhus, Denmark 2020

Background information
- Born: 1951 (age 74–75); Malmbäck, Sweden
- Genres: Jazz
- Occupation: Musician
- Instrument: Trombone

Vincent Nilsson is a Swedish jazz trombonist and arranger.

== Biography ==
Nilsson played in the orchestra on the Miles Davis recording Aura in 1985.

Nilsson recorded Jazz Trombone Spirituals for Storyville Records in 1998. On the album, he used mutes and multiphonics. His second album for Storyville was More Spirituals. It was recorded in August 2004, with pianist Horace Parlan, guitarist John Sund, bassist Bo Stief, plus Ayi Solomon and Eliel Lazo on vocals and percussion, and Emmanel Amadasun on vocals.

Nilsson has been a member of the DR Big Band for several decades, and conducted and arranged their Spirituals album. He also played on their The Jazz Ballad Song Book recording with trumpeter Randy Brecker.

== Discography ==
=== As leader ===
- Jazz Trombone Spirituals (Storyville, 2000)
- More Spirituals! (Storyville, 2005)

=== As a member ===
Danish Radio Big Band

- By Jones, I Think We've Got It (Metronome, 1978)
- Crackdown First U.K. Tour (Hep, 1988)
- Nordjazz Big 5 (Odin, 1991)
- Suite for Jazz Band (Hep, 1992)
- A Little Bit of Duke (Dacapo, 1995)
- The Danish Radio Big Band Plays Thad Jones (Dacapo, 1996)
- This Train (Dacapo, 1997)
- Ways of Seeing (Storyville, 1999)
- Nice Work (Dacapo, 2000)
- The Power and the Glory (Storyville, 2001)
- Lady Be Good (Content, 2003)
- Trollabundin Cope, 12 (Tonar, 2005)
- Dedication Suite (Cape, 2006)
- The Impaler (Red Dot Music, 2010)
- Play Bill Evans (Stunt, 2012) – trombone. recorded in 2000.
- Spirituals (Storyville, 2014) – conductor

=== As sideman ===
With Anders Bergcrantz

- Twenty-Four Hours (Dragon, 1999)
- About Time (Stunt, 2007)

With Miles Davis

- Aura, (Columbia, 1989)

With Peter Herbolzheimer

- Live Im Onkel Po (Polydor, 1975)
- Hip Walk (Polydor, 1976)

With Michael Mantler

- Cerco Un Paese Innocente (ECM, 1995)
- Hide and Seek (ECM, 2001)

With Niels-Henning Ørsted Pedersen

- Hommage/Once Upon a Time (EmArcy, 1990)
- Ambiance (Dacapo, 1994)

With others

- Sigurd Barrett, Live (My Way Music, 2007)
- Marie Bergman, But Beautiful (Stunt, 1994)
- Otto Brandenburg, Otto Brandenburg (Mermaid Music, 1989)
- Anna Lena Brundin, Du Ar Mitt Begar Anna Lena Brundin Sjunger Edith Piaf (Bakhall, 1993)
- Debbie Cameron, Brief Encounter (Metronome, 1978)
- Graham Collier, Winter Oranges (Jazzprint, 2000)
- Tommy Flanagan, Flanagan's Shenanigans (Storyville, 1994)
- Ib Glindemann, Talk of the Town (Olufsen, 1992)
- Dexter Gordon, More Than You Know, (SteepleChase, 1975)
- Thad Jones, A Good Time Was Had by All (Storyville, 1989)
- Flemming Jørgensen, Din Sang (KMF, 1977)
- Tommy Korberg, Live in London (Pep Pop, 1994)
- Palle Mikkelborg, The Voice of Silence (Stunt, 2001)
- Marius Neset, Tributes (ACT, 2020)
- Judy Niemack, New York Stories (Sunnyside, 2018)
- Chris Potter, Transatlantic (Red Dot Music, 2011)
- Gerard Presencer, Groove Travels (Edition, 2016)
- Renee Rosnes, Renee Rosnes and the Danish Radio Big Band (Blue Note, 2003)
- Shu-bi-dua, Shu-Bi-Dua 2 (Polydor, 1975)
- Martial Solal, Contrastes (Storyville, 1999)
- Curtis Stigers, One More for the Road (Concord Jazz, 2017)
- Bengt-Arne Wallin, Miles from Duke (Phono Suecia, 1988)
- Charlie Watts, Charlie Watts Meets the Danish Radio Big Band (Impulse!, 2017)
- Mikael Wiehe, Basin Street Blues (Amalthea, 1988)
- Gustav Winckler, Hvid Jul (Philips, 1978)
- Jens Winther, Angels (Dacapo, 1999)
