= Haastrup =

Haastrup is a surname. Notable people with the surname include:

- Ajimoko I, alias Frederick Kumokun Adedeji Haastrup (born ca 1820), Nigerian king
- Benita Haastrup (born 1964), Danish jazz drummer
- Mark Haastrup (born 1984), Danish golfer
- Mogens Haastrup (born 1939), Danish footballer
- Philipp Haastrup (born 1982), German footballer
- John Haastrup (born 1991), Nigerian Banker
