= Roots (Idrees Sulieman album) =

1958 studio jazz album

Studio album by Idrees Sulieman
- Released: 1958
- Recorded: October 25 and December 6, 1957
- Studio: Van Gelder Studio, Hackensack, New Jersey
- Genre: Jazz
- Length: 42:14
- Label: New Jazz; NJLP 8202
- Producer: Bob Weinstock

Idrees Sulieman chronology
| Interplay for 2 Trumpets and 2 Tenors (1957) | Roots (1958) | Americans in Europe (1963) |

Roots is an album by the Prestige All Stars nominally led by trumpeter Idrees Sulieman recorded in 1957 and released on the New Jazz label.

== Reception ==
Professional ratings
Review scores
| Source | Rating |
|---|---|
| Allmusic | 3/5 stars |

David Szatmary of Allmusic reviewed the album, stating: "More big-band bop with a stellar cast".

== Track listing ==
1. "Roots" (Doug Watkins) – 27:22
2. "Down by the Riverside" (Traditional) – 5:52
3. "Sometimes I Feel Like a Motherless Child" (Traditional) – 9:00

== Personnel ==
- Idrees Sulieman – trumpet
- Jimmy Cleveland (tracks 2 & 3), Frank Rehak (track 1) – trombone
- Pepper Adams (track 1), Cecil Payne (tracks 2 & 3) – baritone saxophone
- Bill Evans (track 1), Tommy Flanagan (tracks 2 & 3) – piano
- Doug Watkins – bass
- Louis Hayes (track 1), Elvin Jones (tracks 2 & 3) – drums
- Alonzo Levister – arranger (tracks 2 & 3)

=== Production ===
- Bob Weinstock – supervisor
- Rudy Van Gelder – engineer
