= Robert Rockwell (disambiguation) =

Robert Rockwell (1920–2003) was an American actor.

Robert Rockwell may also refer to:

- Robert F. Rockwell (1886–1950), U.S. Representative from Colorado
- Bob Rockwell (born 1945), jazz musician
