= The Camel (album) =

Studio album by Idrees Sulieman
- Released: March 19, 1964
- Studio: EMI Studios, Stockholm.
- Genre: Jazz
- Label: Columbia SSX 1008
- Producer: Gunnar Lindqvist

Idrees Sulieman chronology
Americans in Europe (1963)	The Camel (1964)	Now Is the Time (1976)

Professional ratings
Review scores
Source	Rating
Allmusic	3/5 stars

The Camel is a studio album by American trumpeter Idrees Sulieman recorded in 1964 in Sweden with Jamila Sulieman and released on the Columbia label.

== Background ==
Tracks 1–4 were recorded on March, 19 and tracks 5–7 were recorded March 20, 1964 at EMI Studios, Stockholm.

== Track list ==
1. Dawud's Bossa Nova – 6:18
2. Sad And Strange – 2:21
3. The Camel – 6:22
4. Long For The Blues – 3:18
5. Blues For Emanon – 7:51
6. I Remember Clifford – 6:10
7. I'll Remember April – 9:57

== Credits ==
- Alto saxophone – Christer Boustedt (tracks: 1, 2, 3, 4), Idrees Sulieman (tracks: 1, 2, 3, 4, 7)
- Baritone saxophone – Sahib Shihab (tracks: 1, 2, 3, 4)
- Bass – Björn Alke
- Bottle – Ole Kock Hansen (tracks: 4)
- Congas – Jamila Sulieman (tracks: 4)
- Cow bell – Sahib Shihab (tracks: 4)
- Cow horn – Gunnar Östling (tracks: 4)
- Drums – Fredrik Norén (tracks: 5, 6, 7), Ivan Oscarsson (tracks: 1, 2, 3, 4)
- Liner notes – Lars Werner
- Maracas – Idrees Sulieman (tracks: 4)
- Photography – Bo Trenter
- Piano – Göran Lindberg (tracks: 1, 2, 3, 4), Lars Sjösten (tracks: 5, 6, 7)
- Producer – Gunnar Lindqvist
- Reeds – Christer Boustedt (tracks: 4), Fredrik Norén (tracks: 1)
- Technician – Gunnar Lööf
- Tenor saxophone – Bernt Rosengren (tracks: 1, 2, 3, 4, 5), Göran Östling (tracks: 1, 2, 3, 4)
- Trumpet – Bertil Lövgren (tracks: 1, 2, 3, 4), Bo Broberg (tracks: 1, 2, 3, 4), Idrees Sulieman (tracks: 5, 6, 7)
- Vocals – Jamila Sulieman (tracks: 2, 3)
- Wood block – Fredrik Norén (tracks: 4), Jamila Sulieman (tracks: 1)
