= Groovin' (Idrees Sulieman album) =

Studio album by Idrees Sulieman
- Released: 1986
- Recorded: August 2, 1985; Sound Track Studios in Copenhagen, Denmark
- Genre: Jazz
- Length: 57:25
- Label: SteepleChase; SCS 1218
- Producer: Nils Winther

Idrees Sulieman chronology
Bird's Grass (1976)	Groovin' (1986)

Groovin' is an album by the trumpeter Idrees Sulieman recorded in 1985 and released on the SteepleChase label.

== Reception ==
Professional ratings
Review scores
Source	Rating
AllMusic	4/5 stars
The Penguin Guide to Jazz	2/4 stars

Scott Yanow of AllMusic reviewed the album, writing, "Five days short of his 62nd birthday, Idrees Sulieman was still in fine form for this record."

== Track listing ==
1. "Groovin' High" (Dizzy Gillespie) – 10:31
2. "Tell Me What's Your Name" (Kathe Laursen) – 5:53
3. "If I Only Knew" (Idrees Sulieman) – 6:05
4. "Late Before Time" (Kathe Laursen) – 11:18 (previously unissued bonus track on CD)
5. "Lipstick" (Kathe Laursen) – 8:24
6. "The Center of Copenhagen" (Idrees Sulieman) – 8:06
7. "Happy Ending" (Per Goldschmidt) – 7:00

== Personnel ==
- Idrees Sulieman – trumpet
- Per Goldschmidt – tenor saxophone, baritone saxophone
- Horace Parlan – piano
- Mads Vinding – double bass
- Billy Hart – drums
