= Now Is the Time (Idrees Sulieman album) =

Studio album by Idrees Sulieman
- Released: 1976
- Recorded: February 16 & 17, 1976; Weesp, Holland
- Genre: Jazz
- Length: 47:28
- Label: SteepleChase; SCS 1052
- Producer: Nils Winther

Idrees Sulieman chronology
The Camel (1964)	Now Is the Time (1976)	Bird's Grass (1976)

Now Is the Time is an album by trumpeter Idrees Sulieman recorded in 1976 and released on the SteepleChase label.

== Reception ==
Professional ratings
Review scores
Source	Rating
AllMusic	4/5 stars

Allmusic rated the album 4 stars.

== Track listing ==
All compositions by Idrees Sulieman except as indicated

1. "Mirror Lake" – 7:27
2. "Misty Thursday" (Duke Jordan) – 4:26
3. "Saturday Afternoon at Four" – 5:10
4. "A Theme for Ahmad" (Horace Parlan) – 4:54
5. "Now's the Time" (Charlie Parker) – 7:35
6. "The Best I Could Dream" – 4:29
7. "Carefree" – 7:58
8. "The Best I Could Dream" [Alternate Take 3] – 5:29 Bonus track on CD reissue

== Personnel ==
- Idrees Sulieman – trumpet, flugelhorn
- Cedar Walton – piano
- Sam Jones – bass
- Billy Higgins – drums
