= Fredrik Norén =

Swedish jazz drummer and band leader

- Born: 21 April 1941; Stockholm
- Origin: Sweden
- Died: 13 May 2016 (aged 75) Stockholm
- Genres: Jazz
- Occupations: Musician, composer
- Instrument: Drums
- Label: Official website

Fredrik Norén (21 April 1941 – 13 May 2016) was a Swedish jazz drummer and band leader.

== Career ==
In the 1960s, he was active in the jazz circle "Gyllene Cirkeln" and performed with Ben Webster and Dexter Gordon. In the 1970s, he worked with Lars Gullin.

With his own F.N. Band (born 1978), he fostered young jazz musicians and released a series of albums, Jazz in Sweden (1980) as the first. Furthermore, he released The Snake (1984), Juan Carlos (1988) and To Mr J (1990). On his own label he continued with the albums City Sounds (1991), live from the Fasching jazz club in Stockholm, One Day in May (1995) with the jazz singer Lina Nyberg, The pelican (1997), T (1999), FNB Plays (2002), Moon Rush and Live at Glenn Miller Café. The band members has varied, most recently including Lars Ekman on bass, Peter Fredman on alto saxophone Calle Bagge/Jonas Östholm on piano and Nils Janson on trumpet.

With Joakim Milder, Bobo Stenson and Palle Danielsson, he released Sister Majs Blouse (1993) which gave Grammy – later published Epilogue with music of Börje Fredriksson (1998). In trio with Christian Spering and Joakim Milder released the album Association. In a quartet with Bernt Rosengren, Lars Sjösten and Palle Danielsson, he recorded Late Date featuring the music of Lars Gullin. Finally, he released the Sweden Bahia Connection – Coneccão Suecia Bahia recorded in Brazil by Brazilian musicians (2004).

== Honors ==
- 2006: The Lars Gullin Award
- 2006: Lars Färnlöf Award

== Discography ==
=== Solo albums ===
Fredrik Norén Band

- 1980: Jazz in Sweden (Caprice Records)
- 1984: The Snake (Phontastic Records)
- 2001: Plays (Mirrors)
- 2003: Moon rush (Mirrors)
- 1987: Juan Carlos (Mirrors)
- 1990: To Mr J (Sonet Music)
- 1992: City Sounds (Mirrors), live at Fasching jazz club in Stockholm
- 1995: One Day in May (Mirrors), with vocalist Lina Nyberg
- 1997: The Pelican (Mirrors)
- 1999: T (Mirrors)
- 2010: Innside Up (Mirrors)

Other

- 2006: Sweden Bahia Connection (Mirrors)

=== Collaborations ===
With Staffan Abeleen Quintet

- 1964: Persepolis (Philips)
- 1966: Downstream (Philips)
- 1972: Svit Cachasa (SR Records), with Lars Färnlöf and Radiojazzgruppen

With Lennart Åberg

- 1996: The Zone (Mirrors)
- Live at Glenn Miller Café

With Björn Alke's Quartet

- 1974: Jazz I Sverige '74 (Caprice)
- 1976: Fine And Mellow (EMI Sweden)

With Bo Hansson

- 1977: El-Ahrairah (Charisma), 'Music Inspired by Watership Down'

With Brew Moore and Lars Sjösten Trio

- 1972: Brew's Stockholm Dew (Sonet)

With "Sister Maj's Blouse", including with Joakim Milder, Bobo Stenson and Palle Danielsson

- 1993: Sister Maj's Blouse (Mirrors), plays the music of Börje Fredriksson
- 1998: Epilogue – Plays The Music of Börje Fredriksson (Mirrors)
- 2006: In Concert (Mirrors)

With Idrees Sulieman

- 1964: The Camel (Columbia [EMI])

Sivuca with Putte Wickmans Orkester

- 1968: Sivuca (Interdisc)
