= Nicholas Urie =

American music composer

Nicholas Urie (born July 29, 1985, in Los Angeles, California) is an American composer of jazz and classical music. Urie teaches jazz composition at the Berklee College of Music.

Urie was a recipient of the first annual ASCAP Young Jazz Composer's Award. Urie left Los Angeles to study composition with Bob Brookmeyer in Boston MA. A Graduate of the New England Conservatory of Music with both bachelor's and master's degrees, Urie's music has been heard internationally at festivals and concerts in Peru, Syria, Spain, England, Germany, throughout Scandinavia and the United States.

Urie's music has been performed by the Metropole Orchestra, Boston Pops, John Scofield, Kurt Elling, Cory Wong, Bob Brookmeyer, Vince Mendoza, The Spinners, The Scottish National Jazz Orchestra, The Klüvers Big Band, Frank Carlberg, and Dave Samuels.

== Discography ==
Nicholas Urie's records include Live in Amsterdam by Cory Wong & Metropole Orkest (arranger), Quintet (composer), Excerpts From an Online Dating Service (composer), Gnosis by Kutztown University Music (arranger), and My Garden (composer) with poems by Charles Bukowski, and Good Girl Hank (arranger) .
