= Olufsen =

Olufsen is a surname. Notable people with the surname include:

- Bernt Olufsen (born 1954), Norwegian newspaper editor
- Christian Olufsen (1802–1855), Danish astronomer
- Joachim Olufsen (born 1995), Norwegian footballer
- Jørgen Olufsen, Danish politician
- Ole Olufsen (1865–1929), Danish military officer and explorer
- Svend Olufsen (1897–1949), Danish electrical engineer
