= Sinne Eeg =

Danish jazz vocalist and composer

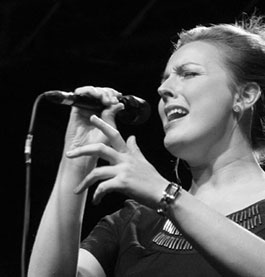

Background information
- Born: 1 September 1977 (age 49); Lemvig, Denmark
- Genre: Jazz
- Occupations: Singer, composer, teacher
- Years active: 2003–present
- Website: sinnemusic.com

Sinne Eeg (born 1 September 1977) is a Danish jazz vocalist and composer.

Eeg has received a number of recognitions and positive reviews both nationally and internationally, and is considered among the best female jazz vocalists currently in Scandinavia. She has composed many of her own songs, and although she usually sings in English, she has also performed and recorded songs in Danish.

Eeg has won the Danish Music Awards prize in the category Best Danish Vocal Jazz Album of the Year four times: in 2007, 2010, 2014 and 2015, for her albums Waiting for Dawn, Don't Be So Blue, Face the Music, and Eeg - Fonnesbæk. She also received the Ben Webster Prize in 2014. The Webster Foundation describes her as "a true jazz singer, who both shows sensitivity, improvisational skills, maturity, broad range and timing in her singing."

== Background ==
Eeg was admitted at the Academy of Music in Esbjerg in 1997; she graduated in 2003. As part of her musical studies she has studied with American singer Janet Lawson in New York City.

Eeg has toured Europe, Japan, China and the United States. On 26 January 2012 she sang in Brussels accompanied by the Danish Radio Big Band at the celebration for the beginning of the Danish Presidency of the Council of the European Union. In Denmark she regularly performs at the jazz venue of La Fontaine in Copenhagen.

== Discography ==
=== Albums ===
Year	Album	Label	Peak positions	Notes
Year	Album	Label	DEN	
2003	Sinne Eeg	Cope	–	
2007	Waiting for Dawn	Calibrated (Cope)	–	DMA 2007
2008	Kun en drøm	Red Dot/EMI	–	Released with English lyrics as "Remembering You"
2009	Remembering You	Red Dot/EMI	–	
2010	Don't Be So Blue	Red Dot/EMI	–	DMA 2010
2012	The Beauty of Sadness	Sinne Music/VME	–	
2014	Face the Music	Stunt (Sundance)	31	DMA 2014; Prix du Jazz Vocal 2014
2017	Dreams	ArtistShare		

=== Collaborations ===
Year	Album	Label	Peak positions	Notes
Year	Album	Label	DEN	
2005	Abrikostræet	Cope	–	With Mads Vinding and Lise Marie Nedergaard (writer, storyteller)
2009	Merry Christmas Baby	Red Dot	–	With Bobo Moreno (singer) and DR Big Band
2015	Eeg – Fonnesbæk	Stunt	–	With bassist Thomas Fonnesbæk; DMA 2015
2020	We've Just Begun	Stunt	–	With DR Big Band

=== Compilations ===
Year	Album	Label	Peak positions	Notes
Year	Album	Label	DEN	
2015	The Best Of	Master Music Ltd	–	

== Awards ==
Amongst Eegs most notable awards are:

- 2007: Vocal Jazz Album of the Year, Danish Music Awards
- 2010: Vocal Jazz Album of the Year, Danish Music Awards
- 2014: Vocal Jazz Album of the Year, Danish Music Awards
- 2014: Ben Webster Prize
- 2014: Prix du Jazz Vocal, Académie du Jazz, Face the Music
- 2015: Vocal Jazz Album of the Year, Danish Music Awards
- 2016: The Queen Ingrid Honorary Grant
