= Impulsive! =

Studio album by Eliane Elias
- Released: 1997
- Recorded: 23–26 February 1997
- Studio: Studio Broadcast House, Copenhagen.
- Genre: Piano jazz
- Length: 54:53
- Label: Stunt Records STUCD 00102
- Producer: Finn Kragerup, Peter H. Larsen

Eliane Elias chronology
The Three Americas (1996)	Impulsive! (1997)	Eliane Elias Sings Jobim (1998)

Professional ratings
Review scores
Source	Rating
AllMusic	4/5 stars
The Penguin Guide to Jazz Recordings	3.5/4 stars

Impulsive! is a studio album by Brazilian jazz artist Eliane Elias. The album was recorded with Bob Brookmeyer and The Danish Radio Jazz Orchestra and released in 1997 via Stunt Records label. All six compositions are written by Elias, and she has solo spots on each.

== Reception ==
Harvey Siders of Jazz Times wrote "Elias is the poster girl for jazz globalization. Brazilian-born, now New York-based, Elias reveals her Latin roots, her classical apprenticeship, her harmonically complex composing skills and her refreshingly contemporary keyboard chops in her performance. All this, in collaboration with Brookmeyer, makes for an outstanding session. Too many solo highlights to credit, but it would be criminal to ignore bassist Thomas Ovesen and the flugelhornist Henrik Bolberg Pedersen, and everyone involved in the scorching title tune."

Jack Bowers of All About Jazz noted "The compositions on Impulsive! are by Brazilian–bred Elias, the charts by Kansas City’s Bob Brookmeyer, and they — and the Danish Radio Jazz Orchestra — form an impressively cosmopolitan team. Orchestrally speaking, Brookmeyer gets the most out of each of Elias’ half–dozen charming melodies, sketching them in bold and brilliant colors, while the DRJO plays them with its usual unruffled proficiency and flair."

== Track listing ==
All tracks are written by Eliane Elias.

No.	Title	Length
1.	"Just Kiddin'"	7:31
2.	"So in Love"	8:42
3.	"Moments"	9:13
4.	"The Time Is Now"	11:48
5.	"One Side of You"	7:52
6.	"Impulsive!"	10:02
Total length:		54:53

== Credits ==
- Eliane Elias – piano
- Bob Brookmeyer – conductor
- Danish Radio Jazz Orchestra
