= Bird's Grass =

Studio album by Idrees Sulieman
- Released: 1985
- Recorded: December 10, 1976; Copenhagen, Denmark
- Genre: Jazz
- Length: 55:56
- Label: SteepleChase; SCS 1202
- Producer: Nils Winther

Idrees Sulieman chronology
Now Is the Time (1976)	Bird's Grass (1985)	Groovin' (1985)

Bird's Grass is a studio album by trumpeter Idrees Sulieman recorded in 1976 but not released on the SteepleChase label until 1985.

== Reception ==
Professional ratings
Review scores
Source	Rating
AllMusic	4.5/5 stars

Scott Yanow of AllMusic reviewed the album, stating "Excellent music with plenty of colorful solos".

== Track listing ==
1. "Wee" (Denzil Best) – 4:57
2. "The Summer Knows" (Alan and Marilyn Bergman, Michel Legrand) – 6:27
3. "Billie's Bounce" (Charlie Parker) – 12:35
4. "Loneliness Is a Mutual Feeling" take 1 (Per Goldschmidt) – 10:36 Bonus track on CD reissue
5. "All Your Words" (Sulieman) – 10:14
6. "Loneliness Is a Mutual Feeling" (Goldschmidt) – 11:07

== Personnel ==
- Idrees Sulieman – trumpet, flugelhorn
- Per Goldschmidt – tenor saxophone
- Horace Parlan – piano
- Niels-Henning Ørsted Pedersen – bass
- Kenny Clarke – drums
