= Thomas Fryland =

Danish jazz trumpeter (born 1969)

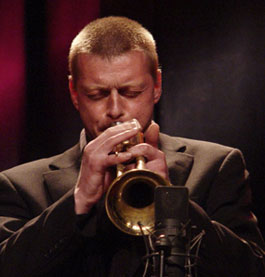

Background information
- Born: 1969; Jutland, Denmark
- Genres: Jazz
- Occupation: Musician
- Instrument: Trumpet
- Labels: Stunt
- Website: www.thomasfryland.com

Thomas Fryland (born 1969) is a Danish jazz trumpeter

== Biography ==
Thomas Fryland was born in a small town in southern Jutland in 1969. In 1990 he was admitted to the Royal Conservatory of The Hague in the Netherlands, graduating two years later. Among his teachers were Frans Elsen, Barry Harris, John Ruocco, and Ack van Rooyen.

His first album as a leader was released in 1993. Since then he has recorded albums with groups. These include an album with jazz arrangements of working class songs commissioned by the Danish Confederation of Trade Unions. From 1998 to 2005 he was a member of the DR Big Band.

He has also participated on a large number of recordings as a sideman and has recorded and toured with Phil Woods, Benny Golson, Maria Schneider, Eric Alexander, Renee Rosnes, Sam Yahel, Dave Hazeltine, Kenny Drew, Niels-Henning Ørsted Pedersen, Bob Mintzer, Mike Stern, Tim Hagans, Randy Brecker, Duke Jordan, Jim McNeely, Toots Thielemans, and Ivan Lins.

Since 2005 he has taught jazz trumpet at the Rhythmic Music Conservatory in Copenhagen, the Royal Academy of Music in Aarhus, and the North Jutland Music Conservatory in Aalborg.

== Awards ==
- 1998 Ben Webster Prize

trip==Discography==

- Selected Discography:
- 1993: Thomas Fryland Quintet: “Copenhagen Sunset” -
- 1994: Thomas Fryland Quartet: “A Fairy's Tale” -
- 1995: TV2: "Kys Bruden"
- 1995: Thomas Fryland Trio: “Playing in the Breeze”
- 1996: Thomas Fryland Quartet: “Perfume and Rain”
- 1996: Beibom/Kroner Big Band: “Live in Copenhagen”
- 1997: Lars Jansson/Katrine Madsen: “Dream Dancing”
- 1997: Thomas Fryland Trio: “Live at Copenhagen Jazzhouse”
- 1998: DR Big Band w/Jens Winther: “Angels”
- 1998: Beibom/Kroner Big Band: “Opposites Attracts”
- 1998: Thomas Fryland Quintet: “The Main Ingredients”
- 1999: Silvana Malta w/DR Big Band: “Flor Do Verao”
- 1999: Thomas Fryland Quintet: "Embracing the Sky”
- 1999: Eric Alexander/Sam Yahel: “Steppin’ Up”
- 1999: Martial Solal w/DRJO: “Contrasts”
- 1999: Phil Woods/Jim McNeely/ DRJO: "Triple Metamorphosis"
- 1999: DR Big Band: "The Governor"
- 1999: DR Big Band w/Thomas Clausen: “August Music”
- 2000: Palle Mikkelborg w/DRJO: “Voice of Silence”
- 2000: Thomas Fryland Quartet: “Songs from My Heart”
- 2000: DR Big Band w/Jim McNeely: “Nice Work”
- 2001: Adam Nussbaum: "More Jazzvisits"
- 2001: DR Big Band w/Jim McNeely: “The Power and the Glory”
- 2002: Graham Collier w/DR Big Band: “Winther Oranges”
- 2002: DR Big Band w/Jim McNeely: “DRJO Plays Bill Evans”
- 2003: Thomas Fryland Sextet: “Metamorphosis Volume 1+2”
- 2003: DR Big Band w/Jim McNeely: “DRJO with Renee Rosens”
- 2004: DR Big Band: “Cuban Flavour”
- 2005: Johnny Reimar: "Blue Moon"
- 2005: DR Big Band: “Trøllabundin”
- 2005 Anders Blichfeldt w/DR Big Band: "Born to be Blue"
- 2006: Thomas Fryland & Jim McNeely: “Another Song”
- 2006: DR Big Band w/Jim McNeely: “Dedication Suite”
- 2007: Ernie Wilkins Almost Big Band: "How High The Moon"
- 2007: Thomas Fryland w/Orazio Maugeri: “Blue Notes”
- 2009: Emil Hess: “Evolution Orchestra”
- 2015: Veronica Mortensen: ”Presents Passed”
- 2015: John Ruocco/Jacob Roved: ”Remembering Billy Strayhorn”
- 2018: Lasse Jacobsen Quintet: ”A Painted Beginning”
- 2020: Thomas Fryland Trio: ”Book of Psalms Volume 1”
- 2021: Thomas Fryland & Hasse Poulsen: “Dream a World”
- 2021: Emil Hess Sextet: “Evolution Stories”
- 2021: Ensemble Edge: “Dimma - the music of Jan Johansson”
- 2022: John Ruocco/Jacob Roved: “A Short Moment”
- 2022: Nordkraft Big Band: “Avennaata Pissaanera”
- 2022: Recordings w/Nathalia Flórez: "Tæthed og Tomhed"
- 2022:Recordings w/AJO & Kalaha
