= Alonzo Levister =

American third stream composer

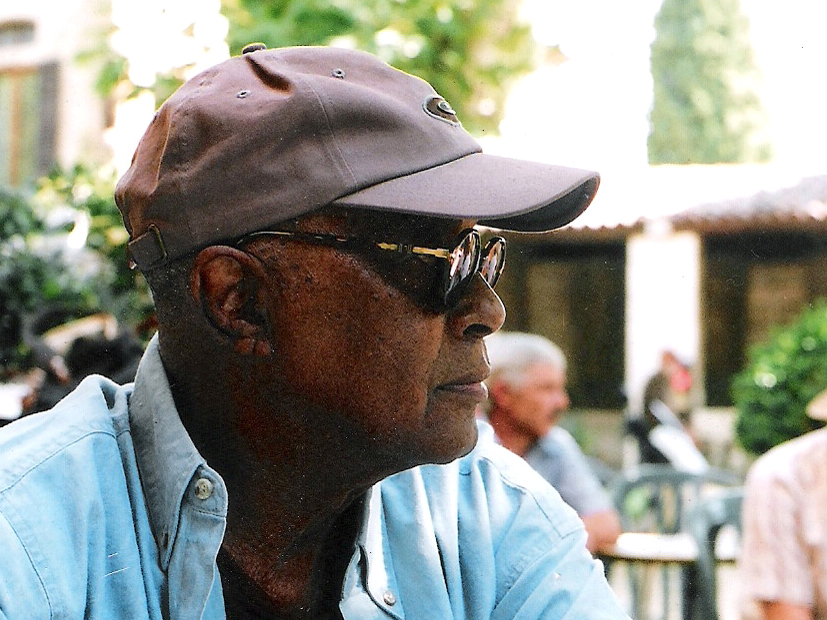
Alonzo Levister in 2007

Alonzo Hamilton Levister (November 1, 1925 in Greenwich, Connecticut – December 6, 2016 in Alcobaça) was an American third stream composer, arranger, music producer and jazz pianist, the son of a Greenwich, Connecticut, and New York City cook for well-known families, and a Mount Vernon, New York, minister.

== Life and work ==
Alonzo Levister grew up in Harlem, New York City, and commenced his music studies at the late age of 21 at the Boston Conservatory (1946). In 1949, he went to Paris where he was accepted by Nadia Boulanger, who had taught George Gershwin, to study music theory and composition as a private student. Following his studies in Paris, he was a student at the Juilliard School (1951).

During the early 1950s he wrote music for several dance companies and choreographers such as Katherine Dunham and Donald McKayle. In 1955 he worked with Charles Mingus and his company Debut Records, arranging for artists such as Don Senay on "The Edge of Love", "Fanny" and "Makin' Whoopee", and with Ada Moore on "Lass from the Low Country".

His suite Manhattan Monodrama appeared in 1956 also from Debut Records and included Louis Mucci, John LaPorta, and Teddy Charles. One of the tracks was "Slow Dance", later recorded by John Coltrane, with Red Garland on the album Traneing In.

In 1957 he wrote the arrangements for the album Roots featuring Prestige All-Stars.

In 1958 he composed a short, jazz-flavored Chamber Opera called Blues in the Subway, promoted by The Village Voice at the Loew's Sheriden Theater.

In the early 1960s he was involved in writing commercial jingles, as well as writing the music with Oscar Brown Jr. for "Slave Story" and writing the music for a musical version of Alice in Wonderland that was mounted at the Sheridan Square Playhouse in Greenwich Village.

One of his commercial jingles, for Prell shampoo, won him the Clio Award for the best musical theme of the year.

In the same period, he orchestrated the Broadway Musical Kicks and Co., which starred Burgess Meredith as "Mr. Kicks" .

He also worked as an arranger and producer for Jobete, the publishing company for Motown Records, and he was a composer and writer for Verve Records.

In 1968 he was one of the composers for the Broadway Musical "New Faces of 1968" in which his future wife of 50 years, Gloria Bleezarde, was a member of the cast, along with her close friend Madeline Kahn. They retired to Nazaré, Portugal.

Alonzo was previously married to Lucille Levister, née Weinstein, with whom he had a son, Kurt Levister.
