= Christina von Bülow =

Danish jazz saxophonist and flutist

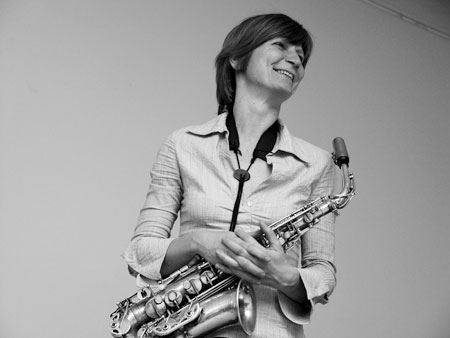

Background information
- Born: 1962; Denmark
- Genres: Jazz
- Occupation: Musician
- Instrument(s): Saxophone, flute
- Website: christinavonbulow.dk

Christina von Bülow (born 1962) is a jazz musician from Denmark who plays saxophone and flute.

The daughter of jazz guitarist Fritz von Bülow, she studied at the Rhythmic Music Conservatory in Copenhagen, graduating in 1990. Von Bülow took private lessons from Stan Getz in 1990 and has also studied and performed with Lee Konitz. She had led her own groups since the 1980s. Von Bülow has also performed with prominent jazz musicians such as Rune Gustafsson, Georg Riedel, Bernt Rosengren, Jan Allan and Horace Parlan.

She has received the JASA (association of Danish jazz critics) Award in 1994, the Ben Webster Prize in 2002, the Palæ Award in 2009 and the Bent Jædig Prize in 2013. Her recordings West of the Moon and A Prima Vez have been nominated for Danish Music Awards.

== Discography ==
- West of the Moon (Music Mecca, 2001)
- My Little Brown Book (2007)
- Silhouette (Stunt, 2012)
- The Good Life (Stunt, 2014)
- On the Brink of a Lovely Song with Palle Danielsson (Storyville, 2018)
