= Alpay (singer) =

Turkish singer (1935–2026)

- Born: Ahmet Alpay Nazikioğlu; July 17, 1935; Ankara, Turkey
- Died: October 14, 2026 (aged 91); Antalya, Turkey
- Occupation: Singer

Ahmet Alpay Nazikioğlu (17 July 1935 – 14 October 2026), better known simply as Alpay, was a Turkish singer.

== Life and career ==
Alpay was born in Ankara on 17 July 1935. He began his musical career in 1960, and experimented with a number of styles, from romantic folk to rock. Alpay also covered a number of French and Italian songs. He is best known with his hit songs "Eylülde Gel" and "Fabrika Kızı".

Alpay died on 14 October 2026, aged 91. On October 16, he was buried at Cebeci Asri Cemetery in Ankara.

== Discography ==
=== 45rpms ===
- Norma Mia (Alpay) / Maç Twist (Şanar Yurdatapan) (1964)
- The Girl In My Town / Mi Sono Innamorato Di Te (1964)
- Esterella Del Mar / If (1964)
- First Kiss / Wheeping River (1964, re-released in 1967)
- Efem / Gelin Ayşem (1965, re-released in 1967)
- Now I'm Alone / Tango Per Favore (1965, re-released in 1967)
- Kara Tren / Waiting On The Hills (1965, re-released in 1967)
- Usted / Luna De Benigrom (1965, re-released in 1967)
- El Vagabundo / Una Ventura Mas (1965, re-released in 1967)
- Estrella Del Mar / Rodico (1967)
- I'll Always Love You / O Mio Signore (1967)
- Final (Şiir) / Ne Reviens Plus - Kirpiklerin Ok Ok Eyle (1967)
- Et Je Sais / Little Bird - My Only Desire (1967)
- E'Finita Cosi / Chove Chova (1967)
- Son Dakikalarim / Kilimandjaro-Jamaica Fara Well (1967)
- Cennet Yolu / Dur Dur Gitme (1968)
- Boş Kadeh / Yağmur (1969)
- Asla Bir Daha Sevemem / Kimse Bilmez Yarın Ne Olur (1969)
- Bekle Aynı İskelede / Aşk Rüyası (1969)
- Bir Tutam Saç / İnsan Hayal Ettiği Müddetçe Yaşar (1969)
- Şehrazat / Bekleyiş (1969)
- Raman - Gelin Ayşe / Kara Tren - Efem (1969)
- Sen Gidince / La La La (1969)
- Susadım Sana / Seninle Ölmek (1970)
- Tren / Bir Akşam (1970)
- Fabrika Kızı / Kolejli Kız (1970)
- Denizciler / Yapraklar Dökülmeden Gel (1970)
- Toprak / Sendin Sevgilim (1970)
- Akça Kızlar / Suna (1971)
- Dağların Gözyaşları / Ağa Düşmüş Kadın (1972)
- Hem Okudum Hem Yazdım / Solmuş Gonca Gül (1972)
- Aşk Böyledir / Gönüllerde Bahar (1972)
- Can Karagözlüm / Sev Ölesiye (1973)
- Kalenin Bayır Düzü / Köylü Kızı (1973)
- Ah Berelim / Ilık Rüzgarlar (1973)
- Yekte / Seni Dileniyorum (1973)
- Allah'ım Yeter / Dağlar Engel Oldu (1974)
- Ben Armudu Dişlerim / Bak Kalbim (1974)
- Ayrılık Rüzgarı / Mecnun Derlerdi (1975)
- Geçmiş Zaman Olur ki - "Yağmur"
- İşte Bak Yeni Bir Gün / Bütün İçkiler Benden Bu Gece (Atilla Engin) (1976)
- Gözlerin / Sevmiştim Seni (1976)
- Eylül'de Gel / Gülen Yüzüme Bakıp Da (1977)
- Aynı Yolun Yolcusu / Dünyalar Benim Olur (1977)
- Sensizliğimin Şarkısı / Aşkların Bittiği Bir Yer mi Var (1979)
- Yeşil Gözler Sürmeli / İçimde Dinmez Sızısın (Grup A1 ile) (1979)

=== Albums ===
- Alpay (1967)
- Alpay (1968)
- 7 Dilde Alpay (1973)
- Alpay (Güven Parkı) (1975)
- Aşk (1978)
- 82 (1982)
- Sevgilerle (With Group A1) (1984)
- Hayalimdeki Resim (1987) (With Group A1, last album as LP, re-released in 1995 as cassette)
- Dünden Bugüne (1988)
- Gitme (1990)
- Senin İçin (1991)
- Anılarla Alpay (1993)
- Eylül'de Gel Demiştim (1993)
- Bu Kaçıncı Sevda (1994)
- Ve Alpay 1996 (1996)
- Muhbbet Kuşları (1997)
- Küçük Bir Öykü/Yüreğine Al Beni (2000)
- Tango&Latin (2001)
- Sessiz Kalma (2004)
- En İyilerle Alpay (2008)
- Aşka Dair (2012)
