= Arrival (Horace Parlan album) =

Studio album by Horace Parlan
- Released: 1974
- Recorded: December 21–22, 1973
- Studio: Rosenberg Studio, Copenhagen
- Genre: Jazz
- Label: SteepleChase
- Producer: Nils Winther

Horace Parlan chronology
Happy Frame of Mind (1963)	Arrival (1974)	No Blues (1975)

Professional ratings
Review scores
Source	Rating
AllMusic	4.5/5 stars
The Penguin Guide to Jazz Recordings	3/4 stars

Arrival is an album by Horace Parlan featuring performances recorded in 1973 and released on the SteepleChase label. It was Parlan's first album for the label and his first recording as a leader for a decade following the end of his association with the Blue Note label.

== Track listing ==
All compositions by Horace Parlan except as indicated

1. "Arrival" – 5:47
2. "For Heaven's Sake" (Elise Bretton, Sherman Edwards, Donald Meyer) – 4:41
3. "Norma" – 5:15
4. "New Start" (Idrees Sulieman) – 7:31
5. "Saucer Eyes" (Randy Weston) – 5:54
6. "Polka Dots and Moonbeams" (Johnny Burke, Jimmy Van Heusen) – 4:35
7. "Waltz, No. 1" – 4:25
8. "Back from the Gig" – 4:18
9. "Bags' Groove" (Milt Jackson) – 3:34
10. "Just Keep A-Walkin'" (Thad Jones) – 8:19

== Personnel ==
- Horace Parlan – piano
- Idrees Sulieman – flugelhorn
- Bent Jædig – tenor saxophone
- Hugo Rasmussen – bass
- Ed Thigpen – drums
