= Ib Glindemann =

Danish musician (1934–2019)

- Born: 27 September 1934
- Origin: Copenhagen, Denmark
- Died: 5 April 2019 (aged 84)

Ib Niels Carl Glindemann Nielsen (September 27, 1934 – April 5, 2019) was a Danish jazz musician and the leader of the Ib Glindemann Orchestra (a big band modeled after the Stan Kenton Orchestra). Saxophonist Stan Getz frequently appeared with them as a guest star when he was in Europe.

== Discography ==
- Fontana Presenting Ib Glindemann and his Orchestra (Fontana, 1963)
- Four Suites with Wolfgang Kafer and Kim Holst (Chappell Recorded Music Library, 1984)
- Industrial / Activity - Holiday Music with Wolfgang Kafer (Chappell Recorded Music Library, 1985)
- Acoustic/Woodwind/Brass with Robert Farnon (Carlin Recorded Music Library, 1990)
- The Man Who Wanted to Be Guilty/The Traitors (Olufsen, 1991)
- Talk of the town (Olufsen, 1992) with DR Big Band – recorded in 1988
- Ping Pong (Mega, 1996)
- A String of Pearls (Mega, 1997)
- Swing Shoes (Mega, 2000)
- 50 Years on Stage Featuring Gitte Hænning (Edel-Mega, 2002)
- Fontana Presenting Ib Glindemann & His 1963 (Universal, 2004)
- Turn on the Heat (Little Beat, 2009)
