= Jesper Thilo =

Danish jazz musician (1941–2026)

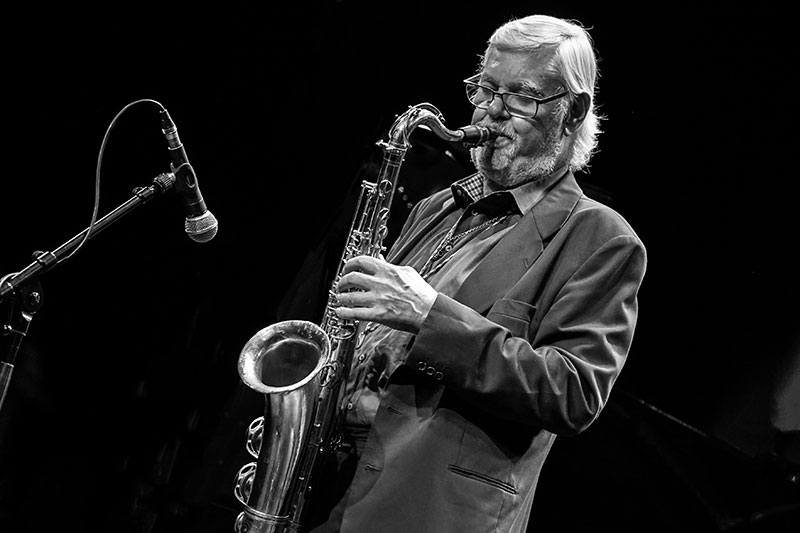
- Thilo in Aarhus, 2018

Background information
- Born: Jesper Thilo; 28 November 1941; Christianshavn, Copenhagen, Denmark
- Died: 25 April 2026 (aged 84)
- Genres: Jazz
- Occupations: Saxophonist, bandleader
- Instruments: Tenor saxophones alto saxophone clarinet flute
- Labels: Storyville Records, Music Mecca

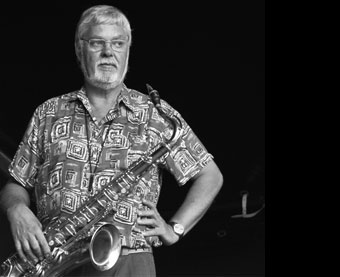
Jesper Thilo

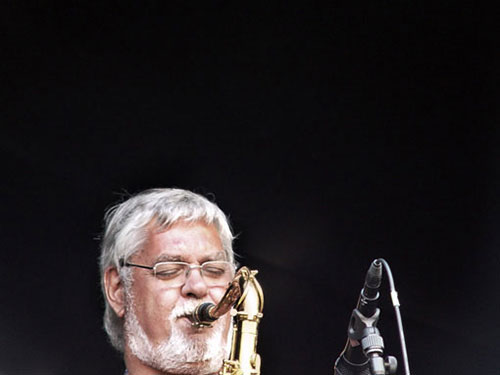
Jesper Thilo

Jesper Thilo (28 November 1941 – 25 April 2026) was a Danish jazz musician, mainly known as a tenor saxophonist, alto saxophonist, and clarinetist. He is considered to be one of the top European straight-ahead jazz musicians of the post-1970 period. Ben Webster and Coleman Hawkins were early influences, while he later developed a highly personal sound reminiscent of Zoot Sims.

Thilo first recorded as a leader for Storyville Records in 1973 and in the 1980s on Storyville his sidemen at various times included Kenny Drew, Clark Terry, and Harry "Sweets" Edison. In the 1980s, he also played in the Ernie Wilkins's Almost Big Band. Thilo also appears on the Miles Davis album Aura recorded in 1985. In 1991, he worked with Hank Jones in a quintet.

== Life and career ==
Jesper Thilo was born on Christianshavn in Copenhagen on 28 November 1941, to a pianist-actress mother and a father who was an architect. He started to play clarinet at age 11 and from 1955 to 1960 he played clarinet and trombone in various amateur Dixieland jazz bands with occasional paid jobs as a musician. Early on he knew that he wanted to become a professional jazz musician but to get an education he chose to study classical clarinet at the Royal Danish Academy of Music.

While still a student at the Academy, Thilo joined Arnved Meyer's orchestra where he played from 1960 to 1964 and again from 1967 to 1974 and it was Arnved Meyer who convinced him to shift to saxophone. In Meyer's band he played with musicians such as Ben Webster, Benny Carter, Harry Edison, Roy Eldridge, and Coleman Hawkins. During this part of his career his virile Swing style chiefly inspired by Webster and Hawkins. Besides his engagement in Meyer's orchestra, Thilo also played in his own band, a quintet which he founded in 1965 and was co-lead of with Torolf Mølgaard and Bjarne Rostvold.

From 1966 to 1989, Thilo was a member of the DR Big Band where he under bandleaders such as Palle Mikkelborg and Thad Jones mainly played alto saxophone but occasionally also tenor saxophone, soprano saxophone, baritone saxophone, concert flute, clarinet or bass clarinet.

Through the 1980s, he played in Ernie Wilkins' Almost Big Band. His other collaborators included Wild Bill Davison and Niels Jørgen Steen.

In 1989, he left the DR Big Band and Ernie Wilkins's orchestra to lead his own bands with members such as Søren Kristiansen, Olivier Antunes, Hugo Rasmussen, and Svend-Erik Nørregaard.

Jesper Thilo died on 25 April 2026, at the age of 84.

== Discography ==
=== As a leader ===
- 1980: Tribute to Frog with Richard Boone, Jesper Lundgaard, Svend-Erik Nørregaard, Clark Terry, (Storyville Records)
- 1980: Copenhagen 1980 (live) with Billy Hart, Jesper Lundgaard, Svend-Erik Nørregaard, Clark Terry, Mads Vinding (Storyville Records)
- 1980: Swingin' Friends with Jesper Thilo Quintet (Storyville Records)
- 1986: Featuring Harry Edison with Harry Edison and Jesper Thilo Quintet(Storyville Records)
- 1990: Shufflin' (Music Mecca)
- 1994: Don't Count Him Out (Pablo Records)
- 1994: Jesper Thilo Quintet: With Hank Jones with Hank Jones, Svend-Erik Nørregaard, Doug Raney, Hugo Rasmussen (Storyville Records)
- 2000: Strike Up the Band with Bob Barnard, Romano Cavicchiolo, Henri Chaix, Stephan Kurmann (Sackville Records)
- 2004: Snap Your Fingers (Music Mecca)
- 2009: Remembering Those Who Were (Stunt Records)
- 2010: Plays Duke Ellington (Ambia)
- 2014: Stardust with Olivier Antunes, Bo Stief, Frands Rifbjerg (Music Mecca)

Compilations:

- 1994: Copenhagen 1980 (Storyville Records)
- 2005: Jesper Thilo and the American Stars, Vol. 1 (Storyville Records)
- 2005: Jesper Thilo and the American Stars, Vol. 2 (Storyville Records)

=== As a sideman ===
With Tommy Flanagan

- Flanagan's Shenanigans (Storyville, 1993)

With Thad Jones

- 1978: Live at Montmartre with Idrees Sulieman, Allan Botschinsky, NHOP (Storyville Records)

With Roland Hanna

- 1987: This Time It's Real with JensThilo Quartet (Storyville Records)

With Miles Davis

- 1989: Aura (Columbia Records)

With Scott Hamilton

- 2012: Scott Hamilton Meets Jesper Thilo (Stunt Records)

== Awards ==
- 1971: Danish jazz musician of the year
- 1977: Ben Webster Prize
