= Christian Olufsen =

Danish astronomer

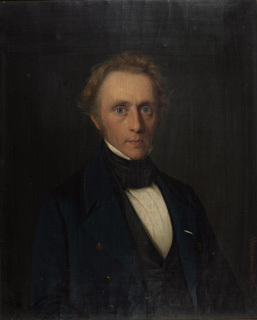
Christian Olufsen painted by Andreas Hunæus, 1846.

Christian Friis Rottbøll Olufsen (15 April 1802 – 29 May 1855) was a Danish astronomer and professor of astronomy at the University of Copenhagen.

Olufsen was born in Copenhagen where his father Oluf Christian Olufsen (1764–1827) was an economist and teacher (also known for his 1793 play, Gulddaasen or "Golden Snuffbox"). He grew up in Classens Have where his father taught at the agricultural institute. After some home schooling he joined Borgerdydskolen in 1812 where he excelled so much that the school thought he should already be sent to university, a proposal prevented by his father. He then went to university where he studied under C.F. Degenand and Erasmus Georg Fog Thune. He received the gold medal in 1824 for his study on eclipse calculations and became an assistant at the observatory. He received a scholarship to study under F.W. Bessel in Königsberg where he interacted with K.A. Steinheil and W. van Struve. He spent some time at the Hamburg observatory and in 1831 joined Copenhagen University as an associate professor. In 1840 he received a doctorate and became professor ordinarius in astronomy. He contributed to studies on the perturbation of the earth, solar tables, errors in measurement, and on the foundations of astronomy as begun by Bessel.

He married Magdalene Frederikke Münter in 1809.
