= Bent Jædig =

Danish jazz musician (1935–2004)

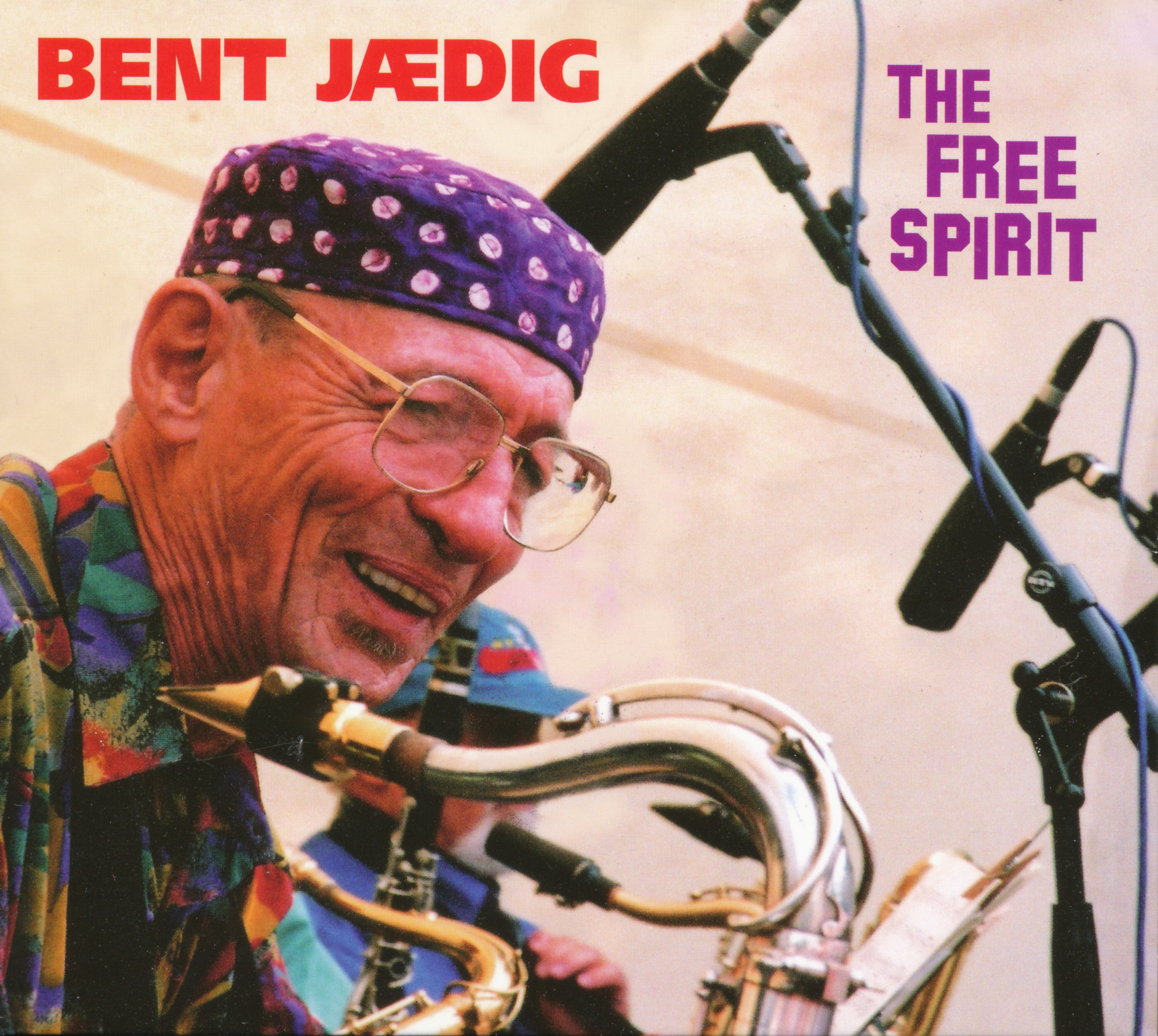

Background information
- Born: 28 September 1935; Copenhagen, Denmark
- Died: 9 June 2004 (aged 68)
- Genres: Jazz
- Occupations: Musician, saxophonist, composer
- Instruments: Tenor saxophone, flute
- Years active: 1957–2004
- Formerly of: Danish Radio Big Band

Bent Jædig (28 September 1935 – 9 June 2004) was a Danish jazz musician. He played tenor saxophone and flute.

== Career ==
Born and raised in Copenhagen, Bent Jædig first studied clarinet before playing saxophone. In the 1950s, he settled in Germany and led a band with trombonist Rudi Fuesers, later joining another band with trombonist Peter Herbolzheimer in Munich. In the 1960s, he returned to Denmark and worked with Danish trumpet player Allan Botschinsky and pianist Bent Axen, with whom he recorded for Danish Debut label. In the following years, he played with the Dollar Brand Quintet which included Don Cherry. As a side-man, Jædig was constantly in demand and worked with such musicians as Tete Montoliu, Jimmy Woode, Philly Joe Jones/Dizzy Reece, and Louis Hjulmand. Jædig recorded his first album as sole leader, Danish Jazzman, in 1967 with Axen, Botschinsky, Dusko Goykovich, Niels-Henning Ørsted Pedersen and Alex Riel. He later formed his own trio included bass player Hugo Rasmussen and drummer Kresten Osgood. In a duo with pianist Carsten Dahl, Jædig recorded live shows in 2002 which later were compiled for a release from Timeless Records.

In the 1970s and 1980s Jædig worked with Wild Bill Davison, Art Farmer, Stan Getz, in the Thad Jones Big Band (Live at Montmartre, 1978), also with Duke Jordan, Horace Parlan (Arrival, 1973), Sahib Shihab (Orgy in Rhythm), and in Ernie Wilkins Almost Big Band. In the 80ern he was also member of the Erling Kroner Tentet; he played th Danish radio big band (conducted by Palle Mikkelborg), recording the Miles Davis album Aura. In 1987, Jædig was a member of Pierre Dørge's New Jungle Orchestra.

At the end of the 1990s Jædig performed in a quintet with Dennis Drud, Erling Kroner, Jørgen Emborg, and Peter Hansen. After Jædig died in 2004, saxophonist Charles Davis recorded the album Charles Davis Plays the Music of Bent Jædig (2006). In 2008, at the Jazzhus Montmartre, a Bent Jædig Memorial Award Celebration was held.

== Reception ==
Kjeld Frandsen, a music critic and journalist from Denmark's Berlingske Tidende mentioned Bent Jædig's influence on Danish Jazz scene for years, in an article published in DanishMusic.Info in January 2008.

Music journalist Kjeld Frandsen wrote: "A Danish tenor saxophonist who was of immeasurable importance to the Danish jazz scene died in the summer of 2004; bebop veteran Bent Jædig. Young musicians flocked around him, learning from his style and his indomitable approach to the music, and it was widely held that an evening on stage with Bent Jædig was worth more than a whole semester at the Conservatory." (The Danish Jazz Scene: "Rich in activities – In Touch With the Whole World", Kjeld Frandsen)

== Discography ==
- Let's Keep the Message (Debut (Dn.), 1960) – Co-led record with Bent Axen
- Danish Jazzman (Debut (Dn.), 1967)
- Egon Denu & Bent Jædig (Olufsen, 1991)
- Sizzlin' (1996)
- Bent the Sailor (2001)
- Bent Jædig Was Here – Live at the Montmartre 1969 (2012)

With DR Big Band

- The Danish Radio Jazz Group With Bent Jædig – 1964 – 1966 (Jazzhus Disk, 2012)

With Philly Joe Jones

- Round Midnight (Lotus, 1980) – recorded in 1969

With Horace Parlan

- Arrival (SteepleChase, 1974)

Compilations

- From Jædig's Galaxy (Storyville, 1966–83, ed. 2003)
- The Free Spirit (Little Beat, 1963–2003) with Tete Montoliu, Niels-Henning Ørsted Pedersen, Dusko Gojkovich, Carsten Dahl, Allan Botschinsky, Duke Jordan, Kenny Drew, Pierre Dorge, Dollar Brand, Don Cherry, Mads Vinding, Art Farmer, Jesper Lundgaard, Dizzy Reece, Isla Eckinger, Philly Joe Jones
