= DR Big Band =

Danish radio ensemble and big band

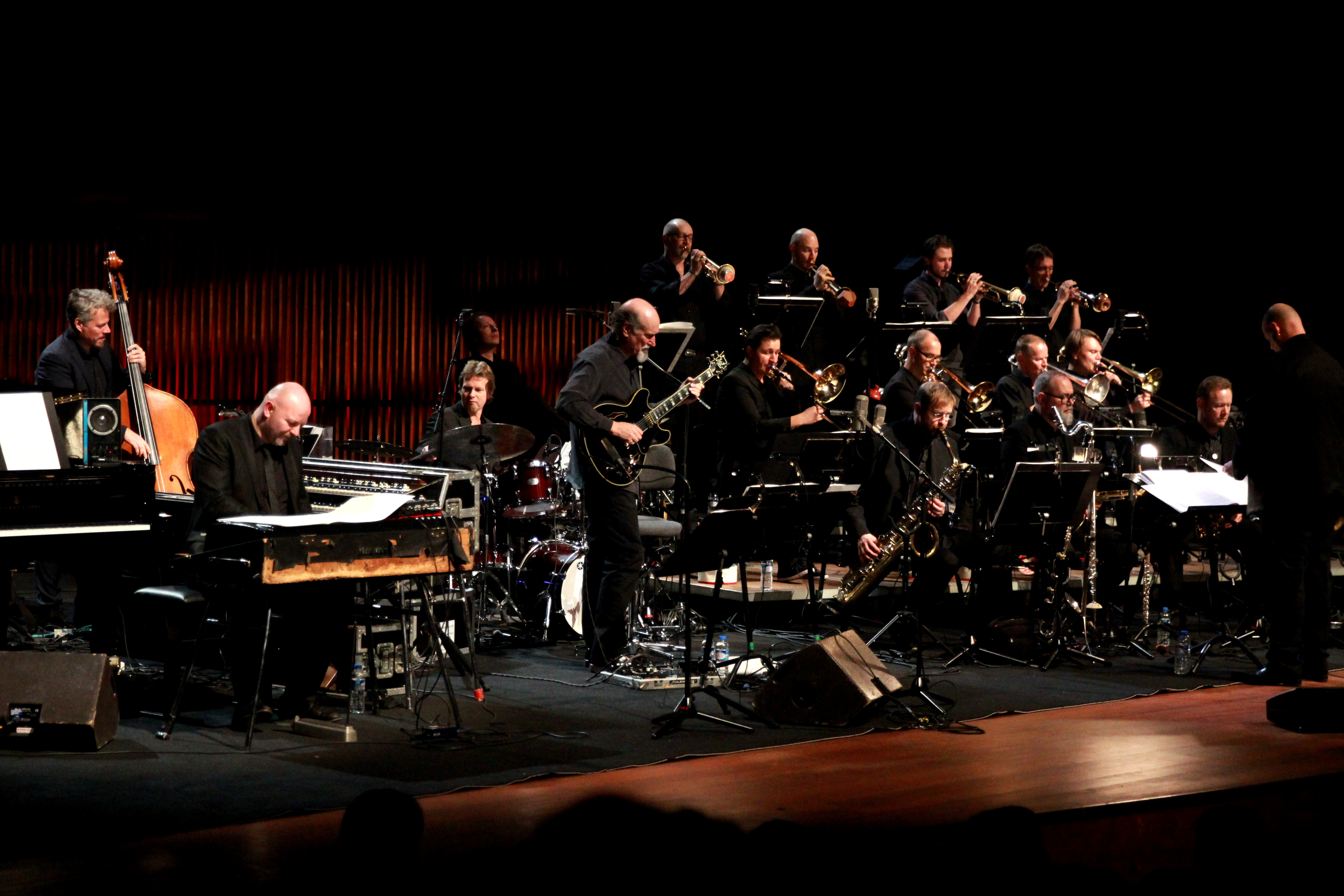
- The Danish Radio Big Band with John Scofield concert at the DR Koncerthuset, Copenhagen October 2019

Background information
- Origin: Denmark
- Genres: Jazz, big band
- Years active: 1964–present
- Website: drkoncerthuset.dk/ensembler/dr-big-band

The Danish Radio Big Band (DR Big Band or Radioens Big Band) is a radio ensemble and big band founded in Copenhagen in 1964 at the Danish Broadcasting Corporation (DR).

== Band history ==
Originally called the New Radio Dance Orchestra, in the early years the band was led by Ib Glindemann. But over the next few decades many new faces joined, such as Chris Potter, Thad Jones, Bob Brookmeyer, Jim McNeely, and guest soloists like Miles Davis, Stan Getz, and Joe Henderson.

Founded as the New Radio Dance Orchestra in 1964 by bandleader Ib Glindemann, the DR Big Band was initially an outgrowth of the then-Danish Broadcasting Corporation Danmarks Radio's desire to represent jazz in the country and over the airwaves. Since 2009, the band has been based out of the Danish Broadcasting Corporation's Copenhagen complex DR Byen, or "DR City," along with several other nationally funded arts ensembles.

As a recording outfit, the DR Big Band debuted in 1970 with Brownsville Trolley, which featured the band led by saxophonist/composer Ray Pitts and trumpeter Palle Mikkelborg. However, the band's output increased throughout the decade under the leadership of famed trumpeter Thad Jones, who had relocated to Copenhagen. During this period, they delivered such well-regarded albums as 1978's By Jones, I think we've got it, and 1979's A good time was had by all. There were also numerous live performances during the band's first three decades, including dates with such luminaries as Stan Kenton, Dizzy Gillespie, Clark Terry, Jimmy Heath, Freddie Hubbard, and many more.

More albums followed in the '90s and found the band starting to showcase artists like saxophonist and guest conductor Ernie Wilkins (Suite for Jazz Band) and Danish saxophonist Jesper Thilo. They also released albums paying homage to the music of Jones and Duke Ellington. This trend of showcasing an artist and their work continued over the next decade as the band played with such luminaries as Thomas Clausen, Toots Thielemans, Renee Rosnes, Eivor Palsdottir, Jim McNeely, and others.

In 2009, they paired with longtime Wynton Marsalis drummer Jeff "Tain" Watts for Impaler, followed a year later by Chromazone with guitarist Mike Stern. Similarly, trumpeter Randy Brecker was the focus of 2011's The Jazz Ballad Song Book. Also that year, lauded saxophonist Chris Potter joined the group for Transatlantic. More albums followed, including works with Richard Bona, Vincent Nilsson, and the band's own trumpeter Gerard Presencer (Groove Travels). Vocalist Curtis Stigers collaborated with the ensemble for his 2017 Frank Sinatra salute One More for the Road. That same year, they delivered the live album Charlie Watts Meets the Danish Radio Big Band, which showcased a 2010 performance with the iconic Rolling Stones drummer.

== Band ==
Members

Trumpet:

- Dave Vreuls
- Ari Bragi Karason
- Thomas Kjærgaard
- Mads La Cour
- Gidon Nunes Vaz

Trombone:

- Peter Dahlgren
- Petter Hängsel
- Annette Saxe
- Gustaf Wiklund
- Jakob Munck Mortensen

Saxophone:

- Peter Fuglsang
- Nicolai Schultz
- Hans Ulrik
- Karl-Martin Almqvist
- Anders Gårdmand

Rhythm group:

- Søren Frost (dr)
- Kaspar Vadsholt (b)
- Henrik Gunde (p)
- Per Gade (g)

=== Former members ===
Saxophone:

- Bent Jædig
- Jesper Thilo (1966–1989)
- Per Carsten

Trumpet:

- Benny Rosenfeld
- Jesper Riis
- Palle Bolvig
- Idrees Sulieman
- Jens Winther (1982–1989)
- Thomas Fryland (1998–2005)
- Henrik Bolberg
- Gerard Presencer

Trombone:

- Vincent Nilsson
- Erling Kroner
- Richard B. Boone
- Vincent Nilsson

Bass:

- Niels-Henning Ørsted Pedersen
- Bo Stief
- Mads Vinding
- Jesper Lundgaard (1989–1991)

Drums:

- Bjarne Rostvold (?–1978)
- Lennart Gruvstedt (1978–?)

== Chief conductors ==
- Ib Glindemann (1964–1968)
- Various guest conductors, including Oliver Nelson, Frank Foster, Robert Cornford, Jimmy Heath, Clark Terry, Mary Lou Williams, Michael Gibbs and Mike Westbrook
- Ray Pitts (1971–1973)
- Palle Mikkelborg (1976–1977 & 1981–1982)
- Thad Jones (1977–1978)
- Ole Kock Hansen (1986–1995)
- Bob Brookmeyer (1996–1997)
- Jim McNeely (1998–2002)
- Miho Hazama (2019– present)

== Discography ==
=== As leader/co-leader ===
- Brownsville Trolley Line (Sonet, 1970) – rec. 1969. conducted by Ray Pitts and Palle Mikkelborg.
- By Jones, I think we've got it (Metronome/Atlantic, 1978) – recorded live at Jazzhus Montmartre, Copenhagen. conducted by Thad Jones.
- A good time was had by all (Metronome/Storyville, 1979) – recorded live at Jazzhus Montmartre, Copenhagen in 1978. conducted by Thad Jones.
- Crackdown: First U.K. Tour (Hep, 1988) – recorded live at Glasgow and York in 1987
- Nordjazz Big 5 (Odin, 1991) – conducted by Ole Koch Hansen
- Suite for Jazz Band with guest conductor Ernie Wilkins (Hep, 1992) – rec. 1991
- Ambiance with Niels-Henning Ørsted Pedersen (Dacapo, 1994) – rec. 1993
- A Little Bit of Duke featuring Jesper Thilo (Dacapo, 1995) – rec. 1994. compositions of Duke Ellington.
- Danish Radio Big Band Plays Thad Jones (Dacapo, 1996) – rec. 1994. compositions of Thad Jones.
- This Train (Dacapo, 1997)
- Ways of Seeing (Storyville, 1999) – rec. 1997
- Nice Work with Jim McNeely (Dacapo, 2000) – rec. 1998
- The Power and the Glory: A salute to Louis Armstrong with Jim McNeely featuring Leroy Jones (Storyville, 2001) – compositions of Louis Armstrong
- Renee Rosnes and the Danish Radio Big Band with Renee Rosnes (Blue Note, 2003) – rec. 2001. conducted by Jim McNeely.
- Lady Be Good with Etta Cameron (Content/DR/CMC, 2004) – rec. 2003. conducted by Nikolaj Bentzon.
- Cuban Flavour (Cope, 2004)
- Trøllabundin with Eivør Pálsdóttir (Cope, 2005) – rec. 2004–05. conducted by Jesper Riis.
- Dansk Stereo (Cope, 2005)
- Dedication Suite with Jim McNeely (Cape, 2006) – rec. 2002
- Chromazone featuring Mike Stern (EMI, 2008) – rec. 2007
- The James Bond Classics featuring Szhirley (EMI/Red Dot, 2008)
- Jazz Divas of Scandinavia with Caecilie Norby, Silje Nergaard, Rigmor Gustafsson (Red Dot, 2009)
- Cirkus Summarum (EMI/Red Dot, 2009)
- Merry Christmas, Baby with Sinne Eeg, Bobo Moreno (EMI/Red Dot, 2009)
- Impressions of a West Side Story (EMI/Red Dot, 2009)
- The Music of Jacob Gade (EMI/Red Dot, 2009) – compositions of Jacob Gade
- The Impaler featuring Jeff "Tain" Watts (Red Dot, 2010) – rec. 2009
- The Phoenix with Vince Mendoza (Red Dot, 2010)
- Cirkus Summarum 2010 (EMI/Red Dot, 2010)
- Play Bill Evans with Jim McNeely (Stunt, 2012) – compositions of Bill Evans. rec. 2000.
- The Danish Radio Jazz Group With Bent Jædig – 1964 - 1966 (Jazzhus Disk, 2012)
- Spirituals (Storyville, 2014) – conducted by Vincent Nilsson
- Jazzin' Around Christmas (Storyville, 2016) – conducted by Dennis Mackrel
- At the Heart of a Selkie with Eivør, Peter Jensen (Tutl, 2016) – also with the Danish National Vocal Ensemble
- Gerard Presencer featuring DR Big Band, Groove Travels (Edition, 2016) – rec. 2015
- Charlie Watts Meets The Danish Radio Big Band with Charlie Watts (Impulse!, 2017) – rec. 2010
- The Beast with Mathias Heise (Giant Sheep Music, 2018)
- Light Through Leaves with Peter Jensen, Morten Büchert (ILK Music, 2021)
- Miho Hazama featuring DR Big Band, Imaginary Visions (Edition, 2021)
- Tale of Time with Annisette (South Harbour, 2022) – rec. 2020
- Miho Hazama featuring DR Big Band, The Babylon Hotel (EuroArts Music International, 2024)
- Miho Hazama featuring DR Big Band, Live Life This Day: Celebrating Thad Jones (Edition, 2025)
- A Love Supreme Revisited with Mathias Heise (April, 2026) – rec. 2025
- Miho Hazama featuring DR Big Band, Frames (Edition, 2026)) – rec. 2025

=== As guest ===
- Bengt-Arne Wallin, The Unexpected Symphony (Sonet, 1979) – rec. 1977
- Ib Glindemann, Talk of the Town (Olufsen, 1992) – rec. 1988
- Georgie Fame, Endangered Species (Music Mecca, 1993)
- Marie Bergman, But Beautiful (Stunt, 1994) – conducted by Ole Kock Hansen
- Eliane Elias, Impulsive! (Stunt, 1997) – conducted by Bob Brookmeyer
- Sigurd Barrett, Live (My Way Music, 2007) – conducted by Nikolaj Bentzon
- Chris Potter, Transatlantic (Red Dot, 2011) – rec. 2010
- Randy Brecker, The Jazz Ballad Song Book (Red Dot, 2011) – also with the Danish National Chamber Orchestra
- Richard Bona, Te Mesia (Red Dot, 2011) – conducted by Jesper Riis
- Siobhan Lamb, The Nightingale and the Rose (Proprius, 2012) – also with Danish National Vocal Ensemble
- Curtis Stigers, One More for the Road (Concord Jazz, 2017) – rec. 2014
- Judy Niemack & Jim McNeely, New York Stories (Sunnyside, 2018) – rec. 2013
- Marius Neset, Tributes (ACT Music, 2020) – rec. 2019
- Sinne Eeg, We've Just Begun (Stunt, 2020) – rec. 2019

== See also ==
- Danish jazz
