= Sigurd Barrett =

Danish celebrity

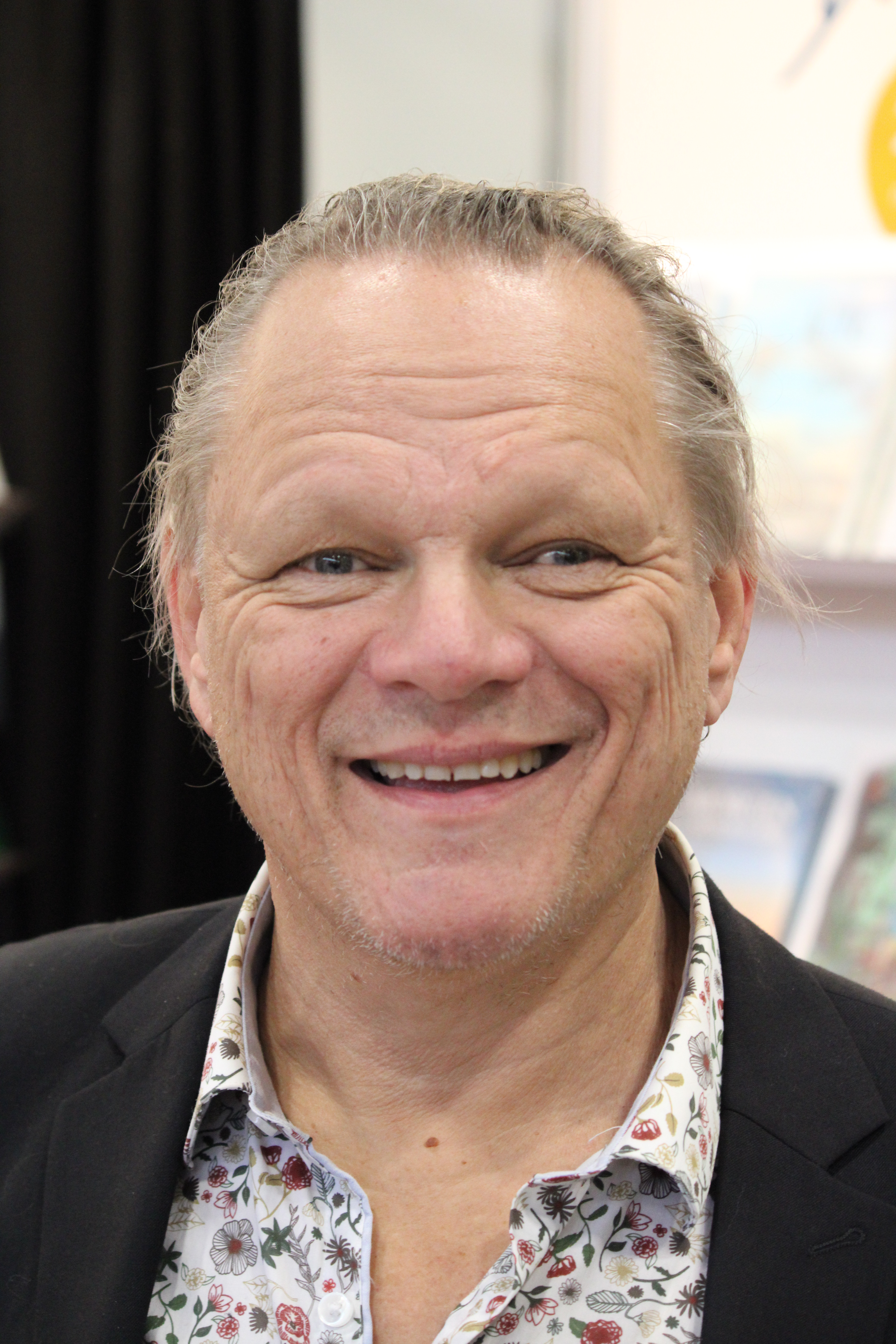
Sigurd Barret, 2025

Sigurd Barrett (born 20 January 1967) is a Danish pianist, children’s singer and entertainer, composer, and writer and creator of "Pilfingerdansen". As a musician, he operates in many genres (jazz, classical, etc.) and is popular within Denmark, especially among children. He is known for his Patriotic songs.

== Biography ==
Sigurd Barrett played the piano for the first time as a two-year-old. At the age of six he composed his first songs. In 1979 he got his first paid job and the following years he played a lot of jobs. He graduated 1992 from Århus University, where he studied music.

His breakthrough was in the TV show "Hit med Sangen" and has later had shows himself. Among others: Sigurds Bjørnetime, a children's program with musical accompaniment; Sigurd og Symfoniorkestret (Sigurd and the symphony orchestra), a program teaching classical music to children; Sigurds Ulvetime, a musical TV show for adults. He made "Pilfingerdansen" in 2002.
