= Americans in Europe =

1963 live jazz albums

Live album by Kenny Clarke / Idrees Sulieman / Bill Smith / Bud Powell / Albert Nicholas / Champion Jack Dupree / Curtis Jones / Don Byas
- Released: 1963
- Recorded: January 3, 1963; Koblenz, West Germany
- Genre: Jazz
- Length: 40:38
- Label: Impulse! AS 36 and AS 37
- Producer: Joachim Ernst Berendt

Vol. 2 Cover

Professional ratings
Review scores
Source	Rating
Allmusic	3/5 stars

Americans in Europe is the title of two live albums by American jazz musicians recorded in West Germany in 1963 and released on the Impulse! label. The two volumes were later reissued on a single CD in 1994 but with five tracks from Vol. 2 omitted.

== Reception ==
The Allmusic review called the CD compilation "A fine bop-oriented set of music by a variety of mostly underrated players".

== Track listing ==
Vol. 1:

1. "No Smokin' / Low Life" – 10:50
2. "I Can't Get Started" – 5:40
3. "Freeway / Pyramid" – 11:30
4. "'Round Midnight" – 7:15

Vol. 2:

1. "My Buddy Run Rabbits" – 4:33 Omitted from CD reissue
2. "Why Daughter How Are You" – 4:00 Omitted from CD reissue
3. "Rose Room" – 3:30 Omitted from CD reissue
4. "Wine, Whiskey and Gin Head Woman" – 6:20 Omitted from CD reissue
5. "Lots of Talk for You" – 2:50 Omitted from CD reissue
6. "All the Things You Are – 9:55
7. "I Remember Clifford" – 7:15

== Personnel ==
Vol. 1, Track 1: Kenny Clarke Trio

- Kenny Clarke – drums
- Jimmy Gourley – guitar
- Lou Bennett – organ

Vol. 1, Track 2: Idrees Sulieman Quartet

- Idrees Sulieman – trumpet
- Bud Powell – piano
- Jimmy Woode – bass
- Joe Harris – drums

Vol. 1, Track 3: Bill Smith Quintet

- Bill Smith – clarinet
- Herb Geller – alto saxophone
- Jimmy Gourley – guitar
- Bob Carter – bass
- Joe Harris – drums

Vol. 1, Track 4: Bud Powell Trio

- Bud Powell – piano
- Jimmy Woode – bass
- Joe Harris – drums

Vol. 2, Tracks 1 & 2: The Traditional Americans in Europe

- Nelson Williams, Peanuts Holland – trumpet
- Albert Nicholas – clarinet
- Earle Howard – piano
- Jimmy Woode – bass
- Kansas Fields – drums

Vol. 2, Track 3: Albert Nicholas Quartet

- Albert Nicholas – clarinet
- Earle Howard – piano
- Jimmy Woode – bass
- Kansas Fields – drums

Vol. 2., Track 4: Champion Jack Dupree

- Champion Jack Dupree – piano, vocals
- Bob Carter – bass

Vol. 2., Track 5: Curtis Jones

- Curtis Jones – piano, vocals
- Bob Carter – bass

Vol. 2, Tracks 6 & 7: Don Byas Quintet

- Don Byas – tenor saxophone
- Idrees Sulieman – trumpet
- Bud Powell – piano
- Jimmy Woode – bass
- Joe Harris – drums
