= Allan Botschinsky =

Danish musician (1940–2020)

Allan Botschinsky (29 March 1940 – 26 November 2020) was a Danish jazz trumpeter and flugelhornist, composer, arranger, conductor, producer, and record label owner.

== Biography ==
Botschinsky was born in Copenhagen, and had a background in classical music. His father played bassoon professionally. He began on trumpet aged 11. At 14, he studied at the Royal Danish Conservatorium. In 1956, he joined Ib Glindemann's big band, where he remained through 1959; he also performed with visiting American musicians around this time, such as Oscar Pettiford, Stan Getz, Dexter Gordon, Lee Konitz, Ben Webster, and Kenny Dorham. From 1963 to 1964,. he studied at the Manhattan School of Music. From 1964, he played with the Danish Radio Big Band.

While with Danmarks Radio, he worked as a conductor and arranger. He was the conductor for several editions of Dansk Melodi Grand Prix and conducted all of Denmark's entries in the Eurovision Song Contest from 1979 to 1983.

In 1985, Botschinsky relocated to Hamburg, Germany, where he worked with Peter Herbolzheimer and the European Trumpet Summit in addition to his own ensembles.

He founded his own label, M.A. Music, with his sister Jette Botschinsky and Marion Kaempfert in 1987, though he also recorded for Storyville, Stunt, and Telefunken. He worked as a sideman with Kenny Dorham, George Gruntz, Nils Lindberg, Bjarne Rostvold, and Sahib Shihab.

Botschinsky died in 2020 from COVID-19, at the age of 80, during the COVID-19 pandemic in Denmark.

== Discography ==
- Duologue (M-A, 1987)
- The Night (M-A, 1988)
- Jazzpar 95 (Storyville, 1995)
- The Bench (Pony Canyon, 1996)
- First Brass (M-A, 2013)
- I've Got Another Rhythm (M-A, 2013)
- Last Summer (M-A, 2013)

with Oscar Pettiford

- 1960 First Bass
- 1962 Last Recordings by the Late, Great Bassist
- 1989 Montmartre Blues

with Ben Webster

- 1970 Masters of Jazz, Vol. 5
- 1970 No Fool, No Fun
- 1970 Plays Ballads
- 1989 Plays Duke Ellington
- 2006 Storyville Ben Webster
- 2007 Dig Ben!
- 2009 100 Years

with Sahib Shihab

- 1963 Sahib's Jazz Party

with Dexter Gordon

- 1975 More Than You Know
- 1976 Strings and Things
