= Hugo Rasmussen =

Danish bassist (1941–2015)

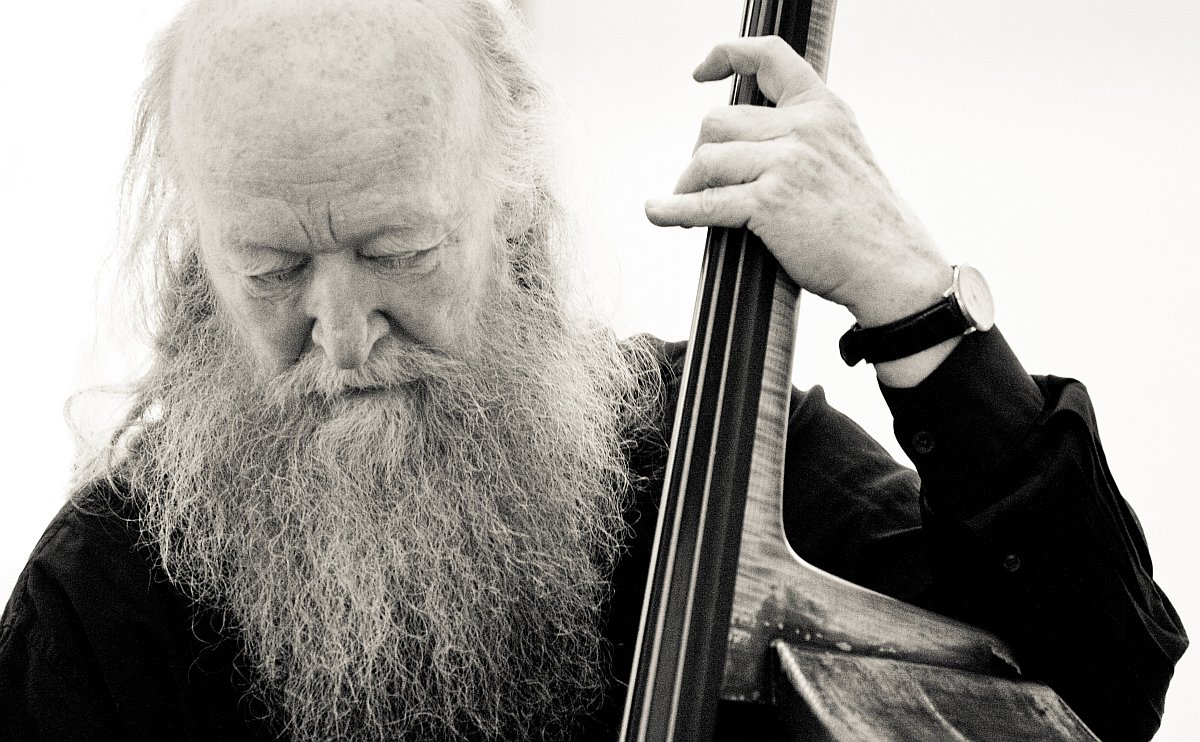
- Hugo Rasmussen in Vanløse Church, May 2010

Background information
- Born: 22 March 1941; Bagsværd, Denmark
- Died: 30 August 2015 (aged 74) Frederiksberg, Denmark
- Genres: Jazz, Hard Bop
- Occupations: Musician, composer
- Instruments: Double-bass, electric bass
- Years active: 1962–2015
- Formerly of: Hugo Rasmussen AllStarz

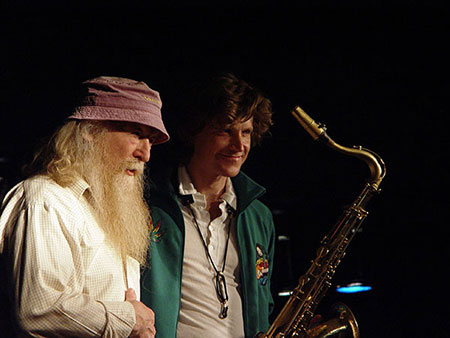
Hugo Rasmussen and Jakob Dinesen.

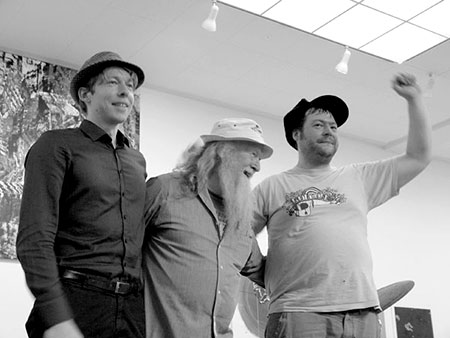
Søren Kjærgaard, Hugo Rasmussen and Kresten Osgood.

Hugo Rasmussen (22 March 1941 – 30 August 2015) was a Danish bassist. Rasmussen is best known for his album Sweets to the Sweet (1978). Sweets To the Sweet was re-released in 2001 on Danish label Music Mecca.

== Biography ==
He worked with, among others, Teddy Wilson, Ralph Sutton Horace Parlan, Ben Webster, Dexter Gordon, Oliver Nelson, Tom Waits, Al Grey, Wild Bill Davison, Harry Sweets Edison, Doug Raney, Ole Kock Hansen, Svend Asmussen, and Jesper Thilo. He was one of the most sought-after bass players in the world and performed on 800 albums.

Rasmussen was the acoustic bassist for Norbert Susemihl's New Orleans All Stars and for his own band, Hugo Rasmussen AllStarz which he formed in 1999 with Jakob Dinesen (tenor sax), Kasper Trandberg (cornet), Andrew Hyhne (trombone), Heine Hansen (piano) and Kresten Osgood (drums). He died at the age of 74 on 30 August 2015.

== Awards ==
- 2000 – Palæ Bars Jazzpris
- 2002 – Ben Webster's Prize of Honour
- 2006 – Bent Jædig Prisen
- 2009 – IFPI Prize of Honour (Ærespris) Danish Music Award Jazz, award from the International Federation of the Phonographic Industry
- 2014 – Dansk Musiker Forbund Prize of Honour
- 2014 – Leo Mathisen Prize

== Selected discography ==
=== As leader ===
- Sweets to the Sweet (1978) Re-released 2001 Music Mecca CD 3046-2 Denmark
- Hugo...Partly Live (2013) Stunt STUCD 13032

=== As sideman ===
- The Jeep Is Jumping Ben Webster 1965 Released in 1991 Black Lion BLCD-760147
- Ben Webster Plays Ballads 1970 Membran
- Swiss Suite Oliver Nelson 1971 RCA
- Birdtown Birds Joe Albany 1973 SteepleChase
- Arrival Horace Parlan 1974 SteepleChase
- Motoring Along Al Cohn & Zoot Sims (Sonet, 1974)
- Harry Sweets Edison – Eddie Lockjaw Davis & Richard Boone (1976) 1997 CD Storyville
- Together Again Wild Bill Davison (1977) LP SLP Cat#:4027, 1998 (CD) Storyville Cat#:8216
- Introducing Doug Raney Doug Raney (1977) with Billy Hart 1994 CD Steeplechase
- The Ralph Sutton Quartet Ralph Sutton (1977) 1996 CD Storyville
- Al Grey and Jesper Thilo Quintet 1986 Storyville
