= Bob Rockwell =

American jazz saxophonist

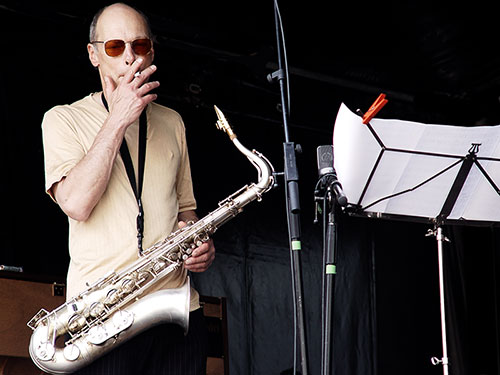
Bob Rockwell, Aarhus Jazz Festival, Denmark

Bob Rockwell (born May 1945 in Miami, Oklahoma) is a jazz saxophonist. He was born in the U.S. but emigrated to Denmark in 1983.

== Biography ==
Rockwell was raised in Minneapolis, and in his early career he toured the U.S. in rock and rhythm and blues bands. He worked in Las Vegas in the late 1960s and early 1970s, then moved to New York City, where he played with The Thad Jones/Mel Lewis Orchestra, Tito Puente, Ben Sidran, Freddie Hubbard, Ray Drummond, Billy Hart, Rufus Reid, Victor Lewis, Ron McClure, Tom Harrell, Chuck Israels, John Hicks, Al Foster, Anthony Cox, Bill Dobbins, Keith Copeland, Clint Houston, and Richie Beirach. After settling in Copenhagen, Rockwell recorded for SteepleChase Records. He has worked in Europe with Ernie Wilkins, Kenny Drew, Alex Riel, Marilyn Mazur, Kenny Wheeler, Jan Kaspersen, and Jesper Lundgaard.

== Awards and honors ==
- 2003 Ben Webster Prize

== Discography ==
- Androids (Celebration, 1974)
- Jungleopolis (with Art Resnick, 1974)
- No Rush (SteepleChase, 1985)
- On the Natch (SteepleChase, 1985)
- The Bob Rockwell Trio (SteepleChase, 1989)
- Reconstruction (SteepleChase, 1990)
- Born to Be Blue (SteepleChase, 1993 [1994])
- Light Blue (SteepleChase, 1995)
- Shades of Blue (SteepleChase, 1996)
- After Hours (Go Jazz, 1999)
- It's All Right With Me (Pony Canyon, 2001)
- Love Eyes (Pony Canyon, 2001)
- Bob's Wilder: Music of Alec Wilder (Stunt, 2003)
- Bob's Ben: A Salute to Ben Webster (Stunt, 2005)
