= Jens Winther =

Danish jazz musician (1960–2011)

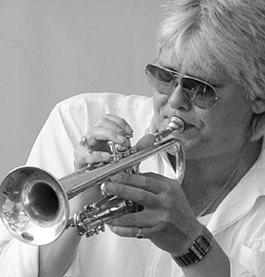

Background information
- Born: 29 October 1960
- Origin: Næstved, Denmark
- Died: 24 February 2011 (aged 50)
- Genres: Jazz, jazz fusion
- Occupations: Musician, composer, arranger, bandleader
- Instruments: Trumpet, flugelhorn
- Years active: 1978–2011

Jens Winther (29 October 1960 – 24 February 2011) was a Danish jazz trumpeter, composer, arranger and bandleader. He composed for and played in a long line of European big bands and other orchestras. His work includes compositions for symphony orchestras, chamber ensembles and choirs. As a bandleader, he was noted on the international Jazz scene with his JW European Quartet (originally a quintet), particularly since 2007. In 2008, he founded the fusion band JW Electrazz. From 2009, he was based in Berlin, Germany.

Jens Winther was born in Næstved, Denmark, in 1960. At the age of 10 he started to play the trumpet and at 18, he moved to Copenhagen to become a professional freelance trumpeter, playing with such bands as the New Jungle Orchestra, the Erling Kroner Tentet, Candentia Nova Danica and Ernie Wilkins' Almost Big Band. In 1982, he became a solo trumpeter in the DR Big Band and in 1985 he also started to compose for it.

In 1989, Winther left the Big Band and moved to New York City after receiving an invitation to join the two-year Jazz Composer's Workshop under the direction of Bob Brookmeyer. At the same time, he worked as a freelance trumpeter, playing with groups and musicians such as the Toshiko Akiyoshi Band, Eddie Palmieri, Kenny Barron, Max Roach, Tito Puente, Marie Bauza Orchestra, George Mraz, and Xavier Cugat Orchestra.

In 1991, after the end of the workshop, he returned to Denmark. He composed for numerous European bands, mainly in the Nordic countries and Germany, as well as other orchestras, and was a trumpeter in various constellations, including in his band Jens Winther Group. On 5 May 1994, his first trumpet concerto for symphony orchestra, Concerto for Trumpet and Orchestra, was performed for the first time. In 1998, he toured with George Gruntz's concert band. On 29 April 1999, Winther and the Aarhus Symphony Orchestra performed his second trumpet concerto, The Eagle, for the first time in Århus Musikhus. He also collaborated with the Metropole Orchestra in the Netherlands on a number of occasions.

In 2007, he experienced an international breakthrough with his JZ European Quintet and went on a worldwide tour which included the United States, Canada, Australia, and China. In 2008, he formed the fusion band JW Electrazz which had its world premiere on 22 March in Copenhagen Jazzhouse. In 2009, he moved to Berlin, Germany, and formed the JW Berlin Quintet.

Winther died in Geneva on 24 February 2011.

== Awards ==
- 1982: Sonning's Music Grant
- 1983: Elected as the Danish representative in the European Youth Jazz Orchestra.
- 1987 Ben Webster Prize
- 1999: Second prize in the International Competition of Jazz Themes, Monaco
- 1998: Award from the Danish National Art Foundation for the Album "The Escape"
- 1990: First prize in the International Competition of Jazz Themes, Monaco
- 1991: First prize in the International Competition of Jazz Themes, Monaco
- 1992: 3-year scholarship as a composer from the Danish National Art Foundation
- 1995 Honorary Award from the organisation of Danish Jazz, Beat and Folk Authors
- * Danish Grammy for the best Danish jazz recording of the year
- 1996: First prize in the International Competition of Jazz Themes, Monaco
- 2009: Lifelong grant from the Danish Arts Foundation
