= Idrees Sulieman =

American bop trumpeter (1923–2002)

Background information
- Born: Leonard Graham; August 7, 1923; St. Petersburg, Florida, U.S.
- Died: July 23, 2002 (aged 78) St. Petersburg, Florida, U.S.
- Genres: Bebop; hard bop
- Occupation: Musician
- Instrument: Trumpet
- Years active: 1940s–1990s
- Labels: Prestige; Blue Note; Atlantic; Verve

Idrees Sulieman (August 7, 1923 – July 23, 2002), born Leonard Graham, was an American bebop and hard bop trumpeter.

== Biography ==
Graham was born in St. Petersburg, Florida, United States, later changing his name to Idrees Sulieman after converting to Islam. He studied at the Boston Conservatory, and gained early experience playing with the Carolina Cotton Pickers and the wartime Earl Hines Orchestra (1943–1944).

On October 15, 1947, he played on Thelonious Monk's first recording for Blue Note Records. Sulieman was closely associated with Mary Lou Williams and for a time and had stints with Cab Calloway, John Coltrane, Count Basie, and Lionel Hampton. Sulieman recorded with Coleman Hawkins (1957) and gigged with Randy Weston (1958–1959), in addition to appearing in many other situations.

He toured Europe in 1961 with pianist Oscar Dennard, and stayed, settling in Stockholm at first, and then moved to Copenhagen in 1964. A soloist with the Kenny Clarke/Francy Boland Big Band from the mid-1960s through 1973, Sulieman frequently worked with radio orchestras. His recordings as a leader were for Swedish Columbia (1964) and SteepleChase (1976 and 1985). In 1985, he was among the performers on Miles Davis's album Aura, which was not released until 1989. Sulieman's career slowed down considerably in the 1990s.

=== Death ===
He died of bladder cancer on July 23, 2002, at St. Anthony's Hospital in St. Petersburg, Florida, at the age of 78.

== Discography ==
=== As leader/co-leader ===
- Three Trumpets (Prestige, 1957) – with Donald Byrd and Art Farmer
- Interplay for 2 Trumpets and 2 Tenors (Prestige, 1957) – with John Coltrane, Bobby Jaspar, Webster Young, et al.
- Roots (Prestige, 1957 [1958]) – with the Prestige All-Stars
- Americans in Europe (Impulse!, 1963) – with Don Byas, Kenny Clarke, Champion Jack Dupree, et al.
- The Camel (Columbia, 1964) – with Jamila Sulieman
- Now Is the Time (SteepleChase, 1976) – with Cedar Walton, Sam Jones, and Billy Higgins
- Bird's Grass (SteepleChase, 1976 [1985]) – with Horace Parlan, Niels-Henning Ørsted Pedersen, and Kenny Clarke
- Groovin' (SteepleChase, 1985 [1986]) – with Horace Parlan

=== As sideman ===
With Gene Ammons

- Jammin' in Hi Fi with Gene Ammons (Prestige, 1957)
- Blue Gene (Prestige, 1958)

With Teddy Charles

- Coolin' (Prestige, 1957 [1959]) – with John Jenkins and Mal Waldron
- Vibe-Rant (Elektra, 1957)

With the Kenny Clarke/Francy Boland Big Band

- Handle with Care (Atlantic, 1963)
- Now Hear Our Meanin' (Columbia, 1963 [1965])
- Sax No End (SABA, 1967)
- Out of the Folk Bag (Columbia, 1967)
- 17 Men and Their Music (Campi, 1967)
- All Smiles (MPS, 1968)
- Faces (MPS, 1968)
- Latin Kaleidoscope (MPS, 1968)
- Fellini 712 (MPS, 1969)
- All Blues (MPS, 1969)
- More Smiles (MPS, 1969)
- Clarke Boland Big Band en Concert avec Europe 1 (Tréma, 1969 [1992])

With Friedrich Gulda

- Friedrich Gulda at Birdland (RCA Victor, 1957)
- A Man of Letters (Decca, 1957)
- From Vienna with Jazz (Columbia, 1964)

With the Prestige Blues-Swingers

- Outskirts of Town (Prestige, 1958)
- Stasch (Prestige, 1961) – with Coleman Hawkins

With Mal Waldron

- Mal-1 (Prestige, 1956 [1957])
- Mal/2 (Prestige, 1957)

With Randy Weston

- Little Niles (United Artists, 1958 [1959])
- The Spirits of Our Ancestors (Verve, 1991 [1992])

With others

- Art Blakey, Art Blakey Big Band (Bethlehem, 1957 [1959])
- Clifford Brown, Memorial (Prestige, 1953 [1956])
- Don Byas and Bud Powell, A Tribute to Cannonball (Columbia, 1961 [1979])
- Miles Davis, Aura (Columbia, 1985 [1989])
- Eric Dolphy, Stockholm Sessions (Enja, 1961 [1981])
- Tommy Flanagan, The Cats (Prestige, 1957 [1959])
- Dexter Gordon, More Than You Know (SteepleChase, 1975)
- Coleman Hawkins, The Hawk Flies High (Riverside, 1957)
- Joe Henderson, Big Band (Verve, 1992; 1996 [1997])
- André Hodeir, American Jazzmen Play André Hodeir (Savoy, 1957)
- Bobby Jaspar, Tenor and Flute (Riverside, 1957) – a.k.a. Bobby Jaspar with George Wallington and Idrees Sulieman (Riverside/OJC, 1992)
- The Jazz Live Trio, Jazz Live Trio with Guests (TCB, 1970; 1975; 1982–83 [2011) – with Benny Bailey
- Thad Jones, Live at the Montmartre: A Good Time Was Had by All (Storyville, 1978)
- Nils Lindberg, Trisection (Columbia, 1962 [1963])
- Carmen McRae, November Girl (Black Lion, 1970)
- Thelonious Monk, Genius of Modern Music, Vol. 1 (Blue Note, 1947)
- Horace Parlan, Arrival (SteepleChase, 1973)
- Max Roach, The Max Roach Quartet featuring Hank Mobley (Debut, 1953)
- Sahib Shihab, Companionship (Vogue Schallplatten, 1964–70 [1971])
- Bengt-Arne Wallin, Old Folklore in Swedish Modern (DUX, 1962)
- George Wallington, Leonard Feather Presents BOP (Mode, 1957)
- Ernie Wilkins, Top Brass (Savoy, 1955)
- Lester Young, Masters of Jazz (Storyville, 1951–56)
