= The Blackest Box =

Greatest hits album by Sort Sol
- Released: April 3, 2011
- Genre: Punk, rock
- Label: Universal

Sort Sol chronology
Circle Hits the Flame – Best Off... (2002)	The Blackest Box (2011)

The Blackest Box is a compilation boxset by Danish punk/rock band Sort Sol/Sods. The boxset comprises 11 CDs – eight CDs with remastered editions of all of the band's studio albums, as well as three bonus CD (including the new songs from the 2002 compilation album Circle Hits the Flame – Best Off...). The boxset includes a new version of the album Unspoiled Monsters. In the boxset the album is named: Unspoiled Monsters / Artist's Cut. The difference from the original release and the version in the boxset is both the order of the tracks on the album and the lack of the song called: "The Painter" from the original release.

== Reception ==
This boxset was received with mixed reviews, while most acknowledge the significance of boxset summarizing the entire career of one of Denmarks punk/rock bands, some lament the lack of a written booklet.

== Track listing ==
For track listings of individual studio albums, see their respective pages.

- Minutes To Go 1979 track listing, using songs remastered in 1997.
- Under en sort sol 1980 track listing, using songs remastered in 1997.
- Dagger & Guitar 1983 track listing, using songs remastered in 1997.
- Everything That Rises Must Converge 1987 track listing, using songs remastered in 1997.
- Flow My Firetear
- Glamourpuss
- Unspoiled Monsters
- Snakecharmer

Stamina 1: 1978–85 – Early Recordings, Outtakes & First Attempts at the Grand Pop Genre
No.	Title	Length
1.	"Rock 'n' Roll" (From 1997 remaster of Minutes To Go)	01:12
2.	"Tin Can People" (From 1997 remaster of Minutes To Go)	01:55
3.	"Military Madness" (From 1997 remaster of Minutes To Go)	01:34
4.	"No Ref" (From 1997 remaster of Minutes To Go)	00:45
5.	"Number One" (From 1997 remaster of Minutes To Go)	04:55
6.	"Breathtaking Effects" (From 1997 remaster of Minutes To Go)	03:12
7.	"Il Zone" (From 1997 remaster of Under en sort sol)	07:42
8.	"Off Morning" (From 1997 remaster of Under en sort sol)	03:19
9.	"Irene The Doorbell" (From 1997 remaster of Under en sort sol)	03:00
10.	"El Toro" (From 1997 remaster of Dagger & Guitar)	03:27
11.	"I Heard A Forest Praying" (From 1997 remaster of Dagger & Guitar)	02:25
12.	"The Sun Ain't Gonna Shine Anymore" (From 1997 remaster of Dagger & Guitar)	03:17
13.	"Ruby Don't Take Your Love To Town" (From 1997 remaster of Dagger & Guitar)	03:04

Stamina 2: 1983–92 – Fog Things & The Violent Bear It Away Recordings
No.	Title	Length
1.	"Indian Summer" (From 1997 remaster of Everything That Rises Must Converge)	04:40
2.	"A Knife for the Ladies" (From 1997 remaster of Everything That Rises Must Converge)	02:51
3.	"Hurricane Fighterplane" (From 1997 remaster of Everything That Rises Must Converge)	03:21
4.	"Shapes Of Summer" (From 1997 remaster of Everything That Rises Must Converge)	03:03
5.	"Angelus Novus" (From 1997 remaster of Everything That Rises Must Converge)	01:56
6.	"The Interpreter" (From 1997 remaster of Everything That Rises Must Converge)	00:39
7.	"Love Is All Around"	03:38
8.	"Дети Pеволюции (Children of the Revolution)" (From 1997 remaster of Everything That Rises Must Converge)	02:31
9.	"Blood on the Saddle" (From 1997 remaster of Everything That Rises Must Converge)	02:30
10.	"Midget Finger" (From 1997 remaster of Everything That Rises Must Converge)	04:28
11.	"Black Sabbath" (From 1997 remaster of Everything That Rises Must Converge)	05:34
12.	"Tatlin Tower" (From 1997 remaster of Everything That Rises Must Converge)	03:34
13.	"As She Weeps" (From 1997 remaster of Everything That Rises Must Converge)	07:22
14.	"Lost His Head"	02:22
15.	"White Shirt" (From 1997 remaster of Dagger & Guitar)	03:14
16.	"...Når Solen Stikker Af"	01:34

Stamina 3: 1991–04 – The Last Bunker Recordings & Esoteric Soundtracks incl. The Hamlet Sessions
No.	Title	Length
1.	"Holler High" (From 2002 compilation Circle Hits the Flame – Best Off...)	04:09
2.	"Circle Hits The Flame" (From 2002 compilation Circle Hits the Flame – Best Off...)	03:05
3.	"Golden Wonder" (From 2002 compilation Circle Hits the Flame – Best Off...)	04:44
4.	"Sugar & Wine"	03:43
5.	"Restless Yellow Night"	03:07
6.	"(Munch) The Painter"	03:32
7.	"Maria Interlude"	02:08
8.	"Angel Of Death (Gletcher Man)"	02:43
9.	"Flammende Kranium – Interlude"	02:11
10.	"Diamond Wind"	03:55
11.	"Frialty"	02:35
12.	"Father Thing"	05:28
13.	"Waah"	02:02
14.	"Witching Time"	01:26
15.	"To Die: To Sleep"	02:11

== Personnel ==
Sods/Sort Sol

- Steen Jørgensen – vocals, pocket trumpet
- Knud Odde – bass
- Tomas Ortved – drums
- Peter Peter – guitar
- Lars Top-Galia – guitar

Additional musicians and production

- Lars Top-Galia – Compilation of Stamina bonus albums
- Jan Eliasson – Mastering of Stamina bonus albums

"Stamina 1"

- Morten Versner – violin on "Il Zone"

"Stamina 2"

- Flemming Nygaard Madsen – cello on "A Knife For The Ladies", "Shapes Of Summer" and "Midget Finger"
- Elisabeth – backing vocals on "A Knife For The Ladies"
- Povl Kristian – organ on "Angelus Novus"
- Wili Jønsson – bass, backing vocals on "Love Is All Around"
- Kjeld Tolstrup – drumtrack on "Love Is All Around"
- Torsten "Metalstein" Hvas – handclaps on "A Knife For The Ladies"
- Mette Shannon – farfisa on "As She Weeps", saxophone, horns on "Children Of The Revolution"
- Karin Ørum – backing vocals on "Children Of The Revolution"

"Stamina 3"

- Wili Jønsson – on "Circle Hits The Flame", "Restless Yellow Night" and "Maria Interlude"
- Wagner/Stage – on "Circle Hits The Flame"
- Charlotte Guillemard – on "Circle Hits The Flame"
- Chapman/Wallis – on "Golden Wonder"
- Peter Schneidermann – "Sugar & Wine"
- The Jordanaries – "Sugar & Wine"
- Maria Rich – "Restless Yellow Night"
- Henrik Liebgott – "Angel Of Death (Gletcher Man)" and "Waah"
- Louisiana Museum Art Ensemble featuring Anton Kontra – "To Die: To Sleep"
