= Copenhagen Jazz Festival =

Annual jazz festival in Copenhagen, Denmark, each July

- Genre: Jazz
- Dates: First Friday of July
- Locations: Copenhagen, Denmark
- Coordinates: 55°40′34″N 12°34′06″E
- Years active: 1979–present
- Website: Official site

Copenhagen Jazz Festival is a jazz event every July in Copenhagen, the capital of Denmark. Copenhagen Jazz Festival was established in 1979, but beginning in 1964 Tivoli Gardens presented a series of concerts under the name Copenhagen Jazz Festival with Thelonious Monk, Miles Davis and many others.

According to reports, the total attendance was 240,000 people during Copenhagen Jazz Festival in 2004. In 2006 the number of concerts increased to 850, and today Copenhagen Jazz Festival numbers more than 100 venues, 1100 concerts, and approximately 260,000 guests, making it one of the largest music events in Europe.

Musicians who have performed at the Copenhagen Jazz Festival include Sonny Rollins, Oscar Peterson, Ray Charles, Michel Petrucciani, Niels-Henning Ørsted Pedersen, Keith Jarrett, Wayne Shorter, Dizzy Gillespie, John Scofield, Herbie Hancock, Pat Metheny, Michel Camilo, Ornette Coleman, Annette Peacock, Svend Asmussen Quartet, Richard Bona, Tony Allen, Chick Corea and Daniel Puente Encina.

== History ==
The founding of Copenhagen Jazz Festival in 1979 is closely linked to the jazz scene that evolved in Copenhagen in the 1960s, when the city served as a European home for American jazz musicians like Dexter Gordon, Ben Webster and Kenny Drew. An inspired music scene attracted even more American musicians and educated and inspired the whole Danish scene as well.

Through the 70s jazz music expanded in terms of genres and audiences, and reaching 1978 lawyer and project manager Poul Bjørnholt (from Københavns City Center) took the initiative to Copenhagen Jazz Festival, when realizing how local jazz clubs, public spaces, theaters and large venues could contribute to this collaborative event.

From 1979 and until the 90s, the festival grew at a steady pace to include both international artists and local bands. Copenhagen Jazz Festival includes over 1,000 concerts taking place across more than 100 venues.

== Venues ==
- Copenhagen Jazzhouse
- Det Kongelige Teater
- Operaen
- Koncerthuset
- Den Sorte Diamant
- La Fontaine
- Jazzhus Montmartre
- Tivoli
- Jazzcup
- Det Kongelige Danske Haveselskab
- Charlottenborg
- Kongens Have
- Huset i Magstræde
- Skuespilhuset
- Christianshavn Beboerhus
- Jazz Club Loco
- Christianskirken
- Kulturhuset Islands Brygge
- Pressen, Politikens Hus
- Prøvehallen
- Amager Bio
- and more

== Festival 1979–2017 ==
Year	Highlights	Venues	Concerts (approx.)
1979	Sonny Rollins Quintet, Pharoah Sanders, Weather Report, Benny Waters, Bob Brookmeyer/Jim Hall, Count Basie, Carla Bley, Ella Fitzgerald/Joe Pass, Horace Parlan/Doug Raney Quartet, Oscar Peterson/Stéphane Grappelli/Niels-Henning Ørsted Pedersen, Ron Carter Quartet, Svend Asmussen, Aske Bentzon, Thad Jones & Bent Jædig, Dollar Brand, Roland Hanna & Thad Jones Quartet, Leonardos Jazzkapel, Papa Bue, New Jungle Orchestra, Clark Terry	14	80
1980	Art Farmer Quartet, Chet Baker, Brecker Brothers, Stan Getz, Jan Garbareks Orkester, Dizzy Gillespie Quartet, Freddie Hubbard Quintet, George Adams/Don Pullen Quartet, John Lee Hooker, Ray Charles, Kenny Drew, John Tchicai, Etta Cameron, Cadentia Nova Danica, Buki Yamaz, Egberto Gismonti, Pat Metheny Group, Dollar Brand, Svend Asmussen, David Liebman, Chico Hamilton	23	110
1981	Gil Evans Orchestra, Herbie Hancock Quartet, Chico Freeman, Art Pepper Quartet, Bennie Wallace Trio, Chick Corea Quartet, Jazz-Rock Summit feat. Michael Brecker, Randy Brecker, Janne Schaffer, Stefan Nilsson & Per Lindvall, Eddie Palmieri, James Blood Ulmer, Dollar Brand, Finn Ziegler, Jesper Thilo	26	N/A
1982	Bennie Carter Group, Jack Walrath Group, Joe Pass/Niels-Henning Ørsted Pedersen Duo, Kenny Drew, Palle Mikkelborg's Entrance, Milton Nascimento, Egberto Gismonti, Sun Ra Arkestra, Charles Lloyd, Michel Petrucciani, Gerry Mulligan Big Band, Bobby McFerrin, Miroslav Vitous, Steps feat. Michael Brecker, Mike Mainieri, Don Grolnick, Eddie Gomez & Peter Erskine, Freddie Hubbard/Joe Henderson/Kenny Barron/Ron Carter/Tony Williams, Horace Parlan, Bent Jædig, Clinch, Ernie Wilkins Almost Big Band	22	100
1983	Art Blakey and His Jazz Messengers, Bobby McFerrin Solo and Baden Powell Solo, Charles Lloyd Quartet, Dizzy Gillespie, McCoy Tyner/Elvin Jones, Duke Jordan Solo Piano, Jan Garbarek Group & Kenny Drew Solo Piano	24	180
1984	Kenny Drew's Trio, Mose Allison Trio, Niels-Henning Ørsted Pedersen, Randy Brecker/Eliane Elias Group, Duke Jordan/Jesper Lundgaard Duo, Stanley Clarke/Miroslav Vitous Duo, Johnny Griffin/Eddie Lockjaw Davis Group, Stanley Clarke, Archie Shepp, Arthur Blythe, Egberto Gismonti/Naná Vasconcelos, Jerry Gonzales, Dollar Brand Septet, Don Pender, Casiopea	26	160
1985	Gilberto Gil Group, McCoy Tyner Trio, Jack DeJohnette Special Edition, Jamaaladeen Tacuma Group, Baltimore Peabody Ragtime Ensemble, Bob Moses Group, Count Basie, Frontline, Jimmy Witherspoon/Dee Dee Bridgewater Group, Joe Pass/Niels-Henning Ørsted Pedersen Duo, Etta Cameron Jazzgroup	40	268
1986	Wayne Shorter Quartet, Carla Bley, David Sanborn Group, Gil Evans Orchestra, John Scofield Group, Betty Carter Trio, Milton Nascimento, John Tchicai Quartet, Terri Lyne Carrington, Egberto Gismonti, Joe Henderson/Woody Shaw	38	N/A
1987	Airto Moreira / Flora Purim, Chick Corea, Gary Burton Group, Gato Barbieri Group w. Bernard Purdie, John Scofield Group, Stan Getz Quartet, Kenny Drew / Jesper Lundgaard, Manhattan Transfer, C.V. Jørgensen, Ornette Coleman & His Prime Time Band w. special guest Don Cherry, Last Exit feat. Peter Brötzmann, Sonny Sharrock, Bill Laswell & Ronald Shannon Jackson	35	N/A
1988	Art Blakey's Jazz Messengers, Dee Dee Bridgewater, Horace Silver Quintet, Michel Petrucciani/Gary Peacock/Roy Hanes, Lee Konitz/Joe Pass duo, Dizzy Gillespie Big Band, Irakere, Lee Konitz Nonet, Michel Camilo Trio, Tony Williams	50	354
1989	Allegro, Betty Carter, Henri Threadgill, Denny Christianson Big Band (CA), Michael Brecker Band, Monty Alexander & his Ivory and Steel Jamboree, New Music Orchestra 1989, Roy Rogers and the Delta Rhythm Kings & Super Diamono de Dakár	53	N/A
1990	Dizzy Gillespie + United Nation Orchestra, Ladysmith Black Mambazo, Michael Brecker Band, Palle Mikkelborg Journey to..., Gary Burton Quintet, Wayne Shorter Group, Herbie Mann, Take 6	57	N/A
1991	Enrico Pieranunzi Trio, David Sanborn Band feat. Kenny Kirkland, Tom Barney, Al Foster, Don Alias, Kip Hanrahan w. Jack Bruce, Michel Camilo Quintet, Yellowjackets & Michael Franks, Bob Berg, Mike Stern Quartet, Robert Cray Band feat. Memphis Horns, Kip Hanrahan & Jack Bruce, Abdullah Ibrahim, Joe Lovano/Jim Hall Grand Slam, Eliane Elias, Joe Henderson	52	N/A
1992	Albert King, Return of the Brecker Brothers, Derek Bailey, The New Music Orchestra, Eliane Elias Group, Fajabefa Nordic Tour '92 feat. Charlie Haden, Jack DeJohnette, Niels-Henning Ørsted Pedersen, Steve Coleman Five elements, Chick Corea & Mario Bauza	51	N/A
1993	Sonny Rollins, Gil Scott Heron, John Abercrombie, Fourmost feat. Jimmy Smith, Herman Riley, Kenny Burrel, Grady Tate, The Wynton Marsalis Septet, Roy Hargrove Quintet, Bill Frisell Band, Dino Saluzzi Mojotoro Project, Arturo Sandoval & His Band, Elvin Jones, Maceo Parker & Roots Revisited, Palle Mikkelborg & Niels-Henning Ørsted Pedersen Trio, New Orleans Original Brass Band, Lluis Vidal, Gangstarr Quartet feat. Guru, Donald Byrd & Roy Ayers Jazzmatazz, Once Around The Park	52	450
1994	Oscar Peterson, Buddy DeFranco & Terry Gibbs Quintet, Lionel Hampton and His Golden Men of Jazz, Thomas Clausen Trio feat. Gary Burton, Gateway, John Abercrombie, Dave Holland, Jack DeJohnette, Mike Stern Group feat. Dave Weckl, Svend Asmussen, Steve Coleman & The Metrics, Egberto Gismonti, Django Bates, Joakim Milder	64	N/A
1995	Art Farmer – Benny Golson Jazztet, B.B.King, Thomas Blachman meets Al Agami and Remee, Wynton Marsalis & Lincoln Center Jazz Orchestra, Django Bates & Delightful Precipice, Eddie Harris Jazzfunk Explosion	54	N/A
1996	Abbey Lincoln, Horace Silver Septet, Jan Garbarek Group, Marilyn Mazur's Future Song, Michel Petrucciani, Niels-Henning Ørsted Pedersen m. Renée Røsnes, Ulf Wakenius, Jonas Johansen og Radiopigekoret, Svend Asmussen, Wayne Shorter Group, Chick Corea, Wallace Roney, Joshua Redman, Christian McBride & Roy Haynes, Abdullah Ibrahim & Joe Lovano/Jim Hall Grand Slam, Davie Liebman, John Abercrombie, Herlin Riley, Kruder & Dorfmeister, Supersilent, Nils Petter Molvær	57	N/A
1997	Herbie Hancock feat. Michael Brecker, Pat Metheny & Dave Holland, Eric Clapton feat. Steve Gadd, Marcus Miller, David Sanborn & Joe Sample, Svend Asmussen Quartet, James Hardway Group, Joe Lovano Quartet & Maceo Parker, Etta Cameron & The Voices of Joy, Arne Domnerus Trio, Renee Rosnes	50	450
1998	Tony Bennett, Barbara Best Singers, Cassandra Wilson, Charles Lloyd Quartet, Joe Louis Walker & The Bosstalkers, Zaniwul Syndicate, Mingus Big Band, Niels-Henning Ørsted Pedersen, Mats Gustafsson & Keith Rowe, Louis Moholo, OK Nok Kongo feat. John Tchicai, Cæcilie Norby & Danish Radio Jazz Orchestra, Marilyn Mazur, Future 3, Eddie Gomez solo	48	500
1999	Keith Jarrett, Herbie Hancock, Tony Bennett, Dianne Reeves, Ralph Izizarry & Timbalaye, Gary Peacock, Jack DeJohnette, Thomas Franck Quartet, Chick Corea & Origin feat. Gary Burton, Ed Thigpen Trio, Niels-Henning Ørsted Pedersen, Svend Asmussen, Palle Mikkelborg, Adam Nussbaum Trio, Ginman/Steen Jørgensen, Tys Tys	60	N/A
2000	Diana Krall, Roy Haynes, Toots Thielemans, Tony Bennett, Michael Brecker/Pat Metheny, Richard Galliano, Natalie Cole, Curtis Stigers, Maria Schneider, McCoy Tyner, Wallace Roney/Jimmy Cobb, Avishai Cohen, Tys Tys, Once Around The Park, Ernie Wilkins Big Band feat. Clark Terry, Regina Carter	70	N/A
2001	Ray Charles, Charlie Haden, Wayne Shorter, Olu Dara, Richard Bona, Dianne Reeves, Bill Frisell, Nnenna Freelon, Peter Brötzmann, Marilyn Mazur, Mike Stern, Joe Lovano, Clark Terry, Marilyn Crispell, Django Bates, Bugge Wesseltoft, Hanne Boel, Jon Balke Grand Magnetic	N/A	N/A
2002	Palle Mikkelborg & Ars Nova, John Scofield, Joe Lovano, Dave Holland, Al Foster, Miroslav Vitous, Michel Portel, Richard Galliano, Svend Asmussen, Pablo Ziegler, Doug Raney, Ed Thigpen, Finn Ziegler, Maceo Parker, Randy Crawford, Django Bates, Tim Berne, Copenhagen Art Ensemble, Thomas Lehn/Paul Lovens, Peter Bastian	N/A	N/A
2003	Dianne Reeves, Tony Bennett, Tomasz Stanko, Herbie Hancock, Cassandra Wilson, Dee Dee Bridgewater, Svend Asmussen, Louis Sclavis, Arve Henriksen, Charanga Habanera, Sidsel Endresen, Bugpowder, Fredrik Lundin Basalt, Palle Mikkelborg, Beautiful Day, Ben Street, Ikscheltaschel, T.I.G.	90	800
2004	Herbie Hancock feat. Wayne Shorter, Dave Holland & Brian Blade, Gilberto Gil, Tomasz Stanko, John Scofield, Danilo Perez, Keith Jarrett Trio, Ahmad Jamal, Milton Nascimento, Dianne Reeves, Albert "Tootie" Heath, Johnny Griffin, Povl Dissing & Benny Andersen, The Bad Plus, Diana Krall	N/A	N/A
2005	Chick Corea, Hermeto Pascoal, Zaniwul Syndicate, Yusuf Lateef, Pierre Dørge & New Jungle Orchestra, Madeleine Peyroux, Curtis Stigers, Jan Garbarek & The Hilliard Ensemble, Brad Mehldau, Gary Burton Quintet, Roy Haynes, Joe Lovano/Hank Jones, Babakarej, Kirsten Ketcher, Bugpowder, Bleeder Group, Marc Ducret, Bugge Wesseltoft, Matthew Herbert, Ginman/Blachman/Dahl, Marilyn Mazur, Efterklang, George Duke	95	N/A
2006	Herbie Hancock, Svend Asmussen Quartet, Salif Keita, Tony Allen, Gotan Project, Pat Metheny, Michel Camilo, Richard Bona, Sergio Mendes, Brad Mehldau, Dianne Reeves, John Scofield/Jack DeJohnette/Larry Goldings, Fred Frith, Otomo Yoshihide, DR Big Band, Maria Laurette Friis, Chris Cheek, Henry Grimes	N/A	N/A
2007	Joshua Redman Trio, Kenny Garrett Quartet, Jan Garbarek Group, McCoy Tyner, Zawinul Syndicate, Mavis Staples, Medeski, Scofield, Martin & Wood, Yellowjackets, Tomasz Stanko, Maceo Parker, Tower of Power, Eliane Elias, Kurt Elling, George Clinton, Bojan Z, Johann Johansson, Bajofondo Tangoclub, Joey DeFrancesco, Fred Frith, Natacha Atlas, Jørgen Leth	89	900
2008	Ornette Coleman, Wayne Shorter, Cassandra Wilson, Annette Peacock, Denmark's New Jungle Orchestra, Joe Lovano, Ravi Coltrane, Dave Liebman, Brad Mehldau Trio, Angélique Kidjo, David Murray, Maceo Parker Black Saint Quartet, Jason Moran, Charles Loyd Quartet & The Zawinul Syndicate	N/A	N/A
2009	Chick Corea, Blind Boys of Alabama, Dianne Reeves/Lizz Wright/Angelique Kidjo/Simone, Palle Mikkelborg Aura, Bajofondo, Spanish Harlem Orchestra, Aaron Parks, Daedelus, Dee Dee Bridgewater, George Duke, James Taylor, Jose Gonzalez, Sebastian, Yusef Lateef	99	900
2010	Herbie Hancock, Elvis Costello, Diana Krall, Martha Wainwright, Joe Lovano & DR Big Band, Caetano Veloso, Marcus Miller & Esperanza Spalding, Scott DuBois, Vijay Iyer, Gratchen Parlato, Joshua Redman Double Trio, Jason Moran Bandwagon, Mark Turner/Larry Grenadier/Jeff Ballard, Eddie Palmieri, Caroline Henderson, David Sanborn/Joey De Francesco/Steve Gadd, Bill Frisell, Raul de Souza, Dianne Reeves, Evan Parker, Fred Frith, Chris Corsano, John Abercrombie	96	N/A
2011	Sonny Rollins, Keith Jarrett/Gary Peacock/Jack DeJohnette, Bobby McFerrin, Mike Stern, Dianne Reeves/ Lizz Wright/Angelique Kidjo, Juhani Aaltonen, Gary Burton, Abdullah Ibrahim, Bunky Green, Charles Lloyd, Terence Blanchard, Brad Mehldau/Joshua Redman, Oumou Sangare, Ebo Taylor, Raul Midon/Richard Bona, Larry Graham & Central Station, Palle Mikkelborg, Michael Blake, Hamid Drake, Andrew Cyrille, The Pyramids, Girls in Airports, Quadron	106	1100
2012	Brad Mehldau Trio, Anoushka Shankar, Miles Smiles, Wayne Shorter Quartet, Choir of Young Believers, Caroline Henderson, The John Scofield Hollowbody Band, Girls in Airports, Vijay Iyer, Jim Hall, Ambrose Akinmusire, Joe Lovano / Dave Douglas, Neneh Cherry & The Thing, Goran Kajfes, The Necks, Nosaj Thing, Chalie Hunter, Milton Nascimento, Lezek Mozdzer, Concha Buika, Getatchew Mekuria, The Ex, Bassakou Kouyate, Tony Allen, Lee Konitz, James Blood Ulmer	109	N/A
2013	Marcus Miller & Richard Bona, Cassandra Wilson, Dianne Reeves, Macy Gray & David Murray Infinity Quartet, Cæcilie Norby, Medeski, Martin & Wood, Becca Stevens, Thundercat, Tomasz Stanko, Ibrahim Maalouf, Mariam The Believer, Paul Jackson, Joelle Leandre, Bill Frisell, Charles Lloyd/Zakir Hussein/Eric Harland, Joe Lovano, Tower of Power, Warren Wolf, Billy Cobham, Sunny Murray, Tyshawn Sorey, Phil Minton, Enrico Pieranunzi, Arturo Sandoval, Betty LaVette, Branford Marsalis, Terence Blachard	97	N/A
2014	Gregory Porter, Chick Corea & Stanley Clarke, The John Scofield Überjam Band, Joey DeFrancesco Trio, Tinariwen, Concha Buika, Daniel Puente Encina, Thurston Moore & Mats Gustafsson, Christian McBride Trio, Hiromi, Cæcilie Norby, Stacey Kent, Danilo Pérez/Brian Blade/John Patitucci, Christian McBride Trio, The Thing, Dave Holland Prism, Jakob Bro/Thomas Morgan/Jon Christensen/Palle Mikkelborg, Shashank Subramanyam, Joshua Redman Quartet, Manu Katche/Richard Bona, Aaron Parks, Joey Alexander, Stian Westerhus, Melissa Aldana, Selvhenter, Josephine Forster feat. Michael Zerang, Juju & Jordash, Kassem Mosse, Søren Kjærgaard/Simon Steen-Andersen	100	N/A
2015	Lady Gaga & Tony Bennett, Herbie Hancock & Chick Corea, Caetano Veloso & Gilberto Gil, Brad Mehldau Trio, Dr. John, Rhiannon Giddens, The Savage Rose, [Michel Camilo, Gary Peacock Trio, Yellowjackets, The Bad Plus, Joshua Redman, Salif Keita, Jamie Cullum, Dianne Reeves, Al Jarreau, Enrico Pieranunzi, Vijay Iyer, Fire! Orchestra, Jason Moran, Eve Risser, Bill Frisell, Ben Sidran, Blood Sport, Charles Hayward, Toto La Momposina, Orlando Julius, Nate Wooley, Maria Faust, Okkyung Lee	95	1300
2016	Burt Bacharach, Gregory Porter, Pat Metheny, Dee Dee Bridgewater, Richard Bona & Mandekan Cubano, Branford Marsalis Quartet ft. Kurt Elling, Charles Lloyd New Quartet, Sun Ra Arkestra directed by Marshall Allen, GoGo Penguin, Melanie De Biasio, Gino Vanelli, Lizz Wright, Bixiga 70, Ed Motta, Egberto Gismonti, Arturo Sandoval, Gary Peacock, Meshiya Lake, Tomasz Stanko, Alexander von Schlippenbach, Micachu, DR Big Band, Marilyn Mazur Shamania	120	1400
2017	Anoushka Shankar, Herbie Hancock, Jamie Cullum, Woody Allen, Norah Jones, Erykah Badu, Bill Frisell Trio, Oumou Sangaré, Roberto Fonseca, Jason Moran, Ambrose Akinmusire, Mark Guiliana, Eliane Elias, Jan Garbarek Group, Lee Konitz/Dan Tepfer, Dee Dee Bridgewater, Curtis Stigers, Cory Henry & The Funk Apostles, David Sanborn, Youn Sun Nah, Coco O., Kira Skov & Maria Faust, Mikkelborg/Lundin/Dahl/Ginman/Blachman, Sølvtøjet, August Rosenbaum, Phronesis, MoGoToYoYo, Matana Roberts, The Music of Nicolai Munch-Hansen	128	1425

== Pre-Copenhagen concerts 1962–1974 ==
Year and venue(s)
1962, Odd Fellow Palæet	Jazz competition: Leonardo Pedersens Jazzkapel (winner)
1963, Odd Fellow Palæet	Jazz competition: Brødrene Vogels Kvartet (winner)
1964, October 4, K.B. Hallen	Miles Davis Quintet feat. Wayne Shorter, Herbie Hancock, Ron Carter & Tony Williams, George Russell Sextet feat. Thad Jones, Niels-Henning Ørsted Pedersen Sextet, Dave Brubeck Quartet, Chicago All Stars, Sister Rosetta Tharpe, Original Tuxedo Jazz Band, Arnvid Meyers Orkester, Dreamland Jam Band
1965, October 31, Tivolis Koncertsal	Sonny Rollins, Dakota Staton, Ornette Coleman, Earl Hines, Lennie Tristano, Lee Konitz & Bill Evans, Art Blakey and his New Jazz Messengers
1966, November 10–11, Tivolis Koncertsal	Max Roach, Willie The Lion Smith, Dave Brubeck Quartet, Stan Getz Quartet, Sonny Rollins Trio, Albert Ayler Trio
1967, November 1–2, Tivolis Koncertsal	Miles Davis Quintet, Sarah Vaughan, Gary Burton Quartet, Thelonious Monk Orchestra, Barney Kessel, Larry Coryell Group, Archie Shepp
1968, October 27–29, Tivolis Koncertsal	Muddy Waters, Horace Silver Quintet, Dizzy Gillespie, Count Basie, Gary Burton Quartet, Red Norvo, Art Blakey's Jazz Messengers, Elvin Jones Trio, Max Roach, Sunny Murray
1969, October 23, Odd Fellow Palæet + November 1–4, Tivolis Koncertsal	Sarah Vaughan, Duke Ellington & Newport All Stars, Miles Davis Quintet feat. Wayne Shorter, Chick Corea, Dave Holland & Jack DeJohnette, Cecil Taylor, Gary Burton Quartet, Ray Charles, Lionel Hampton Octet
1970, Tivolis Koncertsal	Charles Mingus Quintet, Earl Hines, Gerry Mulligan/Dave Brubeck Quartet, Modern Jazz Quartet, Buddy Rich Big Band, Anita O’Day
1971, November 8–9, Tivolis Koncertsal	Miles Davis Quintet feat. Keith Jarrett, Don Alias, Gary Bartz, Mike Henderson, James Mtumu & Leon "Ndugu" Chancler, Ornette Coleman Quartet, The Giant of Jazz feat. Dizzy Gillespie, Thelonious Monk & Art Blakey, Preservation Hall Jazzband, Duke Ellington
1974, Falkoner Centret	McCoy Tyner Quartet, Sonny Rollins Quintet, Stan Getz, Garo Barbieri, Remembering Charlie Parker feat. Earl Hines, Jay McShann, Charles McPherson, Billy Eckstine, Dizzy Gillespie/Sonny Stitt Quintet

== Poster artists ==
- 1979: N/A
- 1980: N/A
- 1981: N/A
- 1982: Pia Schutzmann
- 1983: Per Arnoldi
- 1984: Niels Reumert
- 1985: Bo Bonfils
- 1986: Jens Jørgen Thorsen
- 1987: Hans Henrik Lerfeldt
- 1988: Tom Krøjer
- 1989: Bent Carl Jacobsen
- 1990: Erik Rasmussen
- 1991: Poul Janus Ipsen
- 1992: Knud Odde
- 1993: Egon Fischer
- 1994: Leif Sylvester
- 1995: Jørgen Nash
- 1996: Lars Ravn
- 1997: Henrik Have
- 1998: Dorte Dahlin
- 1999: Per Kirkeby
- 2000: Bjørn Nørgaard
- 2001: Ejler Bille
- 2002: Ib Spang Olsen
- 2003: Per Arnoldi
- 2004: Evren Tekinoktay
- 2005: HuskMitNavn
- 2006: Jonas Hecksher / e-types
- 2007: Henrik Vibskov
- 2008: Kasper Eistrup
- 2009: Tal R
- 2010: Søren Solkær Starbird
- 2011: Kirstine Roepstorff
- 2012: Leo Scherfig
- 2013: Søren Benchke / Papfar
- 2014: Mikkel Sommer
- 2015: Julie Nord
- 2016: Halfdan Pisket
- 2017: Rasmus Meisler
- 2018: Christiane Spangsberg
- 2019: John Kørner
- 2021: Frederik Næblerød
- 2022: Mie Olise Kjærgaard
- 2023: Farshad Farzankia
- 2024: Andreas Korsgaard Rasmussen
- 2025: Dorte Naomi
