= Circle Hits the Flame – Best Off... =

Circle Hits the Flame - Best Off...

Greatest hits album by Sort Sol
- Released: 4 March 2002
- Genre: Rock
- Label: Universal

Sort Sol chronology
Baby (2003)	Circle Hits the Flame - Best Off... (2002)

Singles from Circle Hits the Flame – Best Off...
- 1. "Holler High" Released: February 2002; 2. "Golden Wonder" Released: February 2002

Circle Hits the Flame – Best Off... is the second compilation album by Danish rock band Sort Sol, released on 4 March 2002. The album contains songs from the band's four studio albums released between 1991 and 2002 (Flow My Firetear, Glamourpuss, Unspoiled Monsters, and Snakecharmer). It also includes the three new songs, "Holler High", "Golden Wonder" and "Circle Hits the Flame". The first two are co-written with Søren Rasted of Aqua-fame. "Circle Hits the Flame" is an English translation of "Når solen stikker af", a song recorded for the Danish radio program Tværs in 1994. The album's release was preceded by the lead single "Holler High" in February 2002. The album peaked at number one in Denmark, and was certified platinum by the International Federation of the Phonographic Industry (IFPI) for shipments of 50,000 copies.

== Track listing ==
No.	Title	Writer(s)	Length
1.	"Holler High"	Steen Jørgensen, Søren Rasted, Lars Top-Galia	4:15
2.	"Next Century" (from Snakecharmer)	Lars Top-Galia, Steen Jørgensen	3:38
3.	"Rhinestone" (from Snakecharmer)	Knud Odde	3:58
4.	"Golden Wonder"	Steen Jørgensen, Søren Rasted, Lars Top-Galia	4:47
5.	"Popcorn" (from Glamourpuss)	Knud Odde, Steen Jørgensen, Lars Top-Galia, Peter Peter, Tomas Ortved	4:15
6.	"Let Your Fingers Do the Walking" (from Glamourpuss)	Steen Jørgensen, Lars Top-Galia	4:39
7.	"Brogue" (from Snakecharmer)	Lars Top-Galia, Steen Jørgensen	4:34
8.	"Dog Star Man" (from Glamourpuss)	Steen Jørgensen, Knud Odde, Tomas Ortved, Peter Peter, Lars Top-Galia, Lars Bo Tholstoy Jacobsen	4:06
9.	"Kiss the Streets" (from Unspoiled Monsters)	Steen Jørgensen, Lars Top-Galia	4:43
10.	"I'll Take Care of You" (from Snakecharmer)	Lars Top-Galia, Steen Jørgensen	4:46
11.	"Midnight Train to Summer" (from Flow My Firetear)	Steen Jørgensen, Knud Odde, Tomas Ortved, Lars Top-Galia, Peter Peter	4:01
12.	"Daughter of Sad" (from Flow My Firetear)	Steen Jørgensen, Lars Top-Galia	3:14
13.	"Shaheeba Bay" (from Glamourpuss)	Lars Top-Galia, Tomas Ortved, Knud Odde, Steen Jørgensen	4:08
14.	"Sol 66" (from Unspoiled Monsters)	Knud Odde	4:19
15.	"Elia Rising" (from Snakecharmer)	Knud Odde	4:25
16.	"Erlkönig" (from Unspoiled Monsters)	Lars Top-Galia, Steen Jørgensen	6:36
17.	"Siggimund Blue" (from Flow My Firetear)	Knud Odde, Peter Peter	4:17
18.	"Circle Hits the Flame"	Lars Top-Galia, Steen Jørgensen	3:03

Bonus Edition additional tracks
No.	Title	Length
19.	"Sugar & Wine" (featuring The Jordanaires)	3:42
20.	"...Når solen stikker af"	1:34

== Personnel ==
- Steen Jørgensen – vocals
- Tomas Ortved – drums
- Lars Top-Galia – guitar, bass, keyboards and bells
- Knud Odde – bass and backing and additional vocals
- Peter Schneidenman – guitars and backing vocals

== Charts and certifications ==
=== Charts ===
Chart (2002)	Peak position
Danish Albums Chart	1

=== Certifications ===
Region	Certification	Certified units/sales
Denmark (IFPI Danmark)	Platinum	50,000^{^}
^{^} Shipments figures based on certification alone.
