= Rydin =

Rydin is a surname of Scandinavian origin.

== People with the surname ==
- Andrea Rydin Berge, Norwegian jazz musician
- Axel Rydin (1887–1971), Swedish sailor
- Håkan Rydin (born 1951), Swedish jazz pianist
- Gretchen Rydin, American politician

== See also ==
- Ryding
