= Space Is the Place (Dahl/Andersen/Christensen album) =

2012 studio album

Studio album by Carsten Dahl, Arild Andersen, and Jon Christensen
- Released: 2012
- Recorded: June 5, 2011
- Studio: The Village Recording
- Genre: Jazz
- Length: 42:14
- Label: Storyville
- Producer: Carsten Dahl; Erik Honoré; Jan Bang

Dahl/Andersen/Christensen Trio chronology
Short Fairytales (2006)	Space Is the Place (2012)	Under the Rainbow (2013)

Space Is the Place (released 2012 in Copenhagen, Denmark by Storyville – 101 4271) is a contemporary jazz album by the Danish/Norwegian Dahl/Andersen/Christensen Trio.

== Review ==
Carsten Dahl is credited all the compositions on this delicate album, but along the lines he has drawn there are improvised really fresh and sometimes very freely between the three coequal "moment composers". Dahl is a sound processor, and a dynamic composer with such a personal expression that it is almost incomprehensible that he is right up at the top. Arild Andersen is one that really has understood what an enormous talent Dahl is in possession of. The Norwegian super bassist has worked with Dahl for years and the two have a chemistry that is rare. It is a sublime idea to invite the inimitable Jon Christensen on drums, and the result has to come out in the upper end.

== Reception ==
The review of the Norwegian newspaper Dagbladet awarded the album dice 6, and the review of the Norwegian electronic newspaper Nettavisen awarded the album dice 5.

Professional ratings
Review scores
Source	Rating
Dagbladet	6/6 stars
Nettavisen	5/6 stars

== Track listing ==
All compositions by Carsten Dahl.

1. "Sing, Sing Loud" (3:42)
2. "Perceptions of Time" (4:43)
3. "Space Is the Place" (3:53)
4. "Hcabbach" (5:45)
5. "Saturnia Pavonia" (4:08)
6. "Eyes of an Owl" (2:36)
7. "Nariman's Mood" (5:44)
8. "Reflection" (0:49)
9. "The Wonder" (3:38)
10. "E-Banging" (4:15)
11. "Agnete's Song" (3:07)

== Personnel ==
=== Musicians ===
- Carsten Dahl – piano, percussion
- Arild Andersen – double bass
- Jon Christensen – drums, kalimba

=== Technical ===
- Design – Sønder Omme
- Cover drawing – Jon Christensen
- Photography – Jan Persson
- Recording and mixing engineer – Thomas Vang
- Composer & producer – Carsten Dahl

== Notes ==
- Recorded at The Village Recording, June 5, 2011.
