= Under the Rainbow (album) =

Studio album by Carsten Dahl Arild Andersen Jon Christensen
- Released: 2013
- Recorded: Rainbow Studio, Oslo; April 3 & 4, 2013
- Genre: Contemporary jazz
- Length: 45:35
- Label: Storyville
- Producer: Carsten Dahl; Erik Honoré; Jan Bang

Dahl/Andersen/Christensen Trio chronology
Space Is the Place (2012)	Under the Rainbow (2013)

Under the Rainbow (released 2012 in Copenhagen, Denmark by Storyville – 101 4287) is a contemporary jazz album by the Danish/Norwegian Dahl/Andersen/Christensen Trio.

== Critical reception ==
Professional ratings
Review scores
Source	Rating
Dagbladet	4/6 stars
Nettavisen	4/6 stars

To follow up a success is a difficult task, and Under the Rainbow by Dahl/Andersen/Christensen Trio does not live up to its predecessor. Still a notable album by some of the ultimate jazz musicians of our time. It is always exciting to meet these gentlemen, no matter what context it is in. This trio has constantly had something special about them and it still has.

The review of the Norwegian newspaper Dagbladet awarded the album dice 4, and the review of the Norwegian electronic newspaper Nettavisen awarded the album dice 4.

== Track listing ==
All compositions by Dahl/Andersen/Christensen except when otherwise noted

1. "Under the Rainbow #1" (3:31)
2. "Under the Rainbow #2" (5:14)
3. "Under the Rainbow #3" (6:27)
4. "Koloni På Yderkanten" (4:04) - composed by Carsten Dahl
5. "Under the Rainbow #4" (3:36)
6. "Under the Rainbow #5" (5:14)
7. "Under the Rainbow #6" (4:29)
8. "Two Geese in the Sky" (5:13) - composed by Carsten Dahl
9. "Under the Rainbow #7" (4:09)
10. "Under the Rainbow #8" (3:40)

== Personnel ==
- Carsten Dahl - Piano
- Arild Andersen - Bass
- Jon Christensen - Drums

== Credits ==
- Recording & Mixing – Jan Erik Kongshaug
- Producer – Carsten Dahl

== Notes ==
- Recorded in Rainbow Studio, Oslo on April 3 & 4, 2013.
