= Valhalla Rising =

Valhalla Rising may refer to:

- Valhalla Rising (novel), a 2001 novel by Clive Cussler
- Valhalla Rising (film), a 2009 Danish film directed by Nicolas Winding Refn
