= Minutes to go =

Minutes to Go may refer to:

- Minutes To Go an album by Danish punk band Sods
- Minutes to Go (poetry), a Beat generation collaboration of Gregory Corso, Brion Gysin and William S. Burroughs
