= Carsten Dahl =

Danish pianist

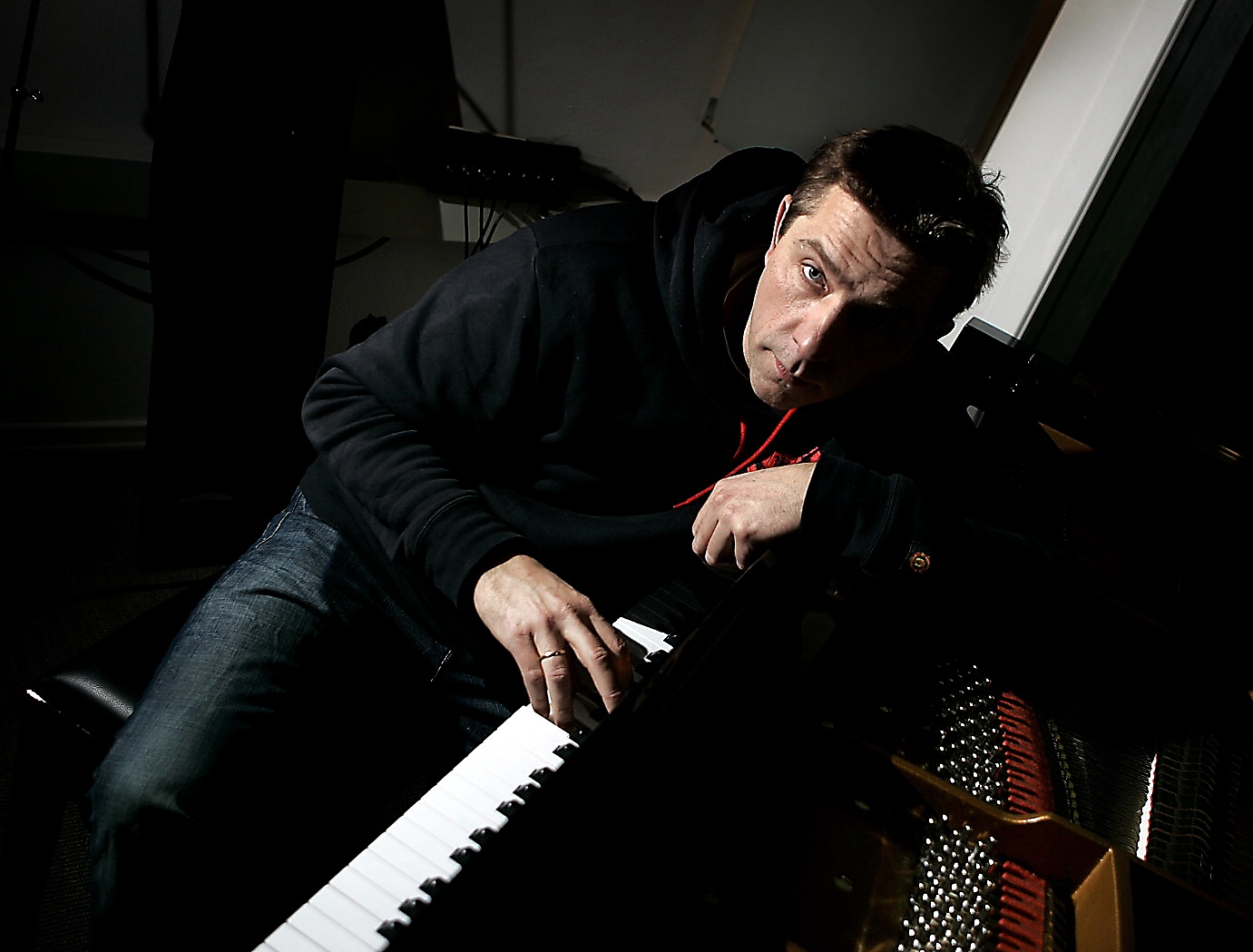
- Dahl in 2010

Background information
- Born: 3 October 1967 (age 59); Copenhagen, Denmark
- Genres: Jazz, classical, experimental
- Occupations: Musician, composer
- Instruments: Piano, drums
- Years active: 1982–present
- Website: Official website

Carsten Dahl (born 3 October 1967) is a Danish pianist.

== Early life ==
Dahl was born in Copenhagen on 3 October 1967. His first instrument was the drums, which he began playing at the age of nine. He taught himself both drums and piano, then studied both at Det Rytmiske Musikkonservatorium in Copenhagen. Dahl said that, "As a pianist, I am greatly influenced by Jørgen Nielsen and later, Butch Lacy who had a significant impact on my musical identity both as a mentor, icon and spiritual teacher."

== Later life and career ==
Dahl turned professional in 1982. He was part of tenor saxophonist Thomas Agergaard's quartet from 1991 and drummer Ed Thigpen's Rhythm Features band from 1998. Dahl also led the rhythmic department of the West Jutland Academy of Music, Esbjerg, from 1992 to 1996 and taught at Det Rytmiske Musikkonservatorium for the following two years, and again for five years from 2011. He taught piano at the Danish Rhythmic Conservatory between 2012 and 2015, but said that he resigned because his "spiritual and highly religious approach to understanding what art really is caused certain conflicts with the general idea of the schools programmes".

By 2022, Dahl had played on approximately 300 albums. He is also a painter. He said in 2020: "My pictures vary from the almost golden age of painting yet set in a modern context to specifically complex abstractions."

== Discography ==
=== As leader/co-leader ===
Year recorded	Title	Label	Notes
1996	Will You Make My Soup Hot & Silver	Storyville	Trio, with Lennart Ginman (bass), Frands Rifbjerg (drums, percussion)
1996–2003	Solo Piano	Stunt	Solo piano
1998	Message from Bud	Storyville	Trio, with Lennart Ginman (bass), Frands Rifbjerg (drums)
1999	The Butterfly Dream	Storyville	Solo piano
2000?	Lys På Himlen	Dacapo	Duo, co-led with Christina Dahl (soprano sax)
2000	Jazzpar 2000 Quintet	Storyville	Quintet, with Jörg Huke (trombone), Tony Coe (tenor sax, clarinet), Lars Danielsson (bass), Aage Tanggaard (drums); in concert
2002	The Sign	Stunt	with Arild Andersen, Patrice Heral
2003	Moon Water	Stunt	Trio, with Arild Andersen (bass), Patrice Heral (drums)
2003?	The Library Bar Concerts	Verve	with Lennart Ginman, Thomas Blachman
2004	Copenhagen-Aarhus	Edge	Solo piano
2004?	Blue Train	Marshmallow	Trio, with Lennart Ginman, Frands Rifbjerg
2005?	Ginman/Blachman/Dahl!	Universal	with Lennart Ginman, Thomas Blachman
2005–2007	In Your Own Sweet Way	Storyville	Trio, co-led with Mads Vinding (bass), Alex Riel (drums)
2006?	God Bless the Child	Marshmallow	with Lennart Ginman, Frands Rifbjerg, Bob Rockwell
2006?	Charlie Butterfly	Stunt	Duo, with Allan Vegenfeldt
2006?	Det gyldne landskab	Private	with Christina Dahl
2006?	Short Fairytales	EmArcy	with Arild Andersen, Jon Christensen
2006?	Tribute to Night Train	Ploug Partnership	
2007	A Good Time	Storyville	Trio, with Lennart Ginman (bass), Frands Rifbjerg (drums); in concert
2007?	Bebopish Rubbish Rabbit	Marshmallow	Trio, with Lennart Ginman, Frands Rifbjerg
2008?	Minor Meeting	Grave News	Trio, with Jesper Lundgaard, Alex Riel
2008	Humilitas	Storyville	Quartet, with Jesper Zeuthen (alto sax), Nils Davidsen (bass), Stefan Pasborg (drums)
2010	Effata	Storyville	Solo piano
2011?	Synesthesia & Metropolis	Exlibris	With Ensemble MidtVest
2011	Metamorphosis	Storyville	Quartet, with Jesper Zeuthen (alto sax), Nils Davidsen (bass, percussion, flute), Stefan Pasborg (drums, percussion)
2011	Live at Montmartre	Storyville	Duo, co-led with Eddie Gómez (bass); in concert
2011	Space Is the Place	Storyville	Trio, with Arild Andersen (bass), Jon Christensen (drums)
2012	Live at SMK	ILK	Duo, co-led with Stefan Pasborg (drums); in concert
2012	Dreamchild	Storyville	Solo piano
2012	Soliluquy	Exlibris	With Ensemble MidtVest; in concert
2013	Under the Rainbow	Storyville	Trio, with Arild Andersen (bass), Jon Christensen (drums)
2013	Reverentia	Storyville	Quartet, with Jesper Zeuthen (alto sax), Nils Davidsen (bass), Stefan Pasborg (drums)
2013?	Papillon	Tiger	Solo piano
2014?	Bach – The Goldberg Variations for Prepared Piano	Tiger	Solo piano
2014	The Myth & the Moth	Tiger	Solo piano
2015?	Grace	Tiger	Solo piano
2016	Caleidoscopia	Storyville	Quartet, with Jesper Zeuthen (alto sax), Nils Davidsen (bass), Stefan Pasborg (drums)
2016	The Jester	Exlibris	Solo harpsichord
2016	Live	Storyville	Quartet, with Jesper Zeuthen (alto sax), Nils Davidsen (bass), Stefan Pasborg (drums); in concert
2016	Simplicity	Storyville	Trio, with Lennart Ginman (bass), Frands Rifbjerg (drums)
2019	Painting Music	ACT	Trio, with Nils Bo Davidsen (bass), Stefan Pasborg (drums)
2019	The Solo Songs of Keith Jarrett	Storyville	With Palle Mikkelborg (trumpet), Fredrik Lundin (sax), Nils Bo Davidsen (bass), Stefan Pasborg (drums), Ana Feitosa and Matthew Jones (violin), Sanna Ripatti (viola), Jonathan Slaatto (cello); in concert
2019	Mirrors Within	Storyville	Trio, with Nils Bosse Davidsen (bass), Stefan Pasborg (drums)
2021?	Sagn	Storyville	Solo piano
2021	A Beautiful Blue Moment	Storyville	Quartet, with Tim Hagans (trumpet), Johnny Åman (bass), Jukkis Uotila (drums); in concert

=== As sideman ===
Year recorded	Leader	Title	Label
1994–95	Lars Møller	Cross Current	Stunt
1996–98	Richard Boone	A Tribute to Love	Stunt
1998	Ed Thigpen	It's Entertainment	Stunt
1999	Mads Vinding	Six Hands, Three Minds, One Heart	Stunt
2001	Ed Thigpen	The Element of Swing	Stunt
2002	Cæcilie Norby	First Conversation	Blue Note
2002	Ed Thigpen	Live at Tivoli Copenhagen	Stunt
2003	Ulf Wakenius	Forever You	Stunt
2017	Mads Vinding	Standards	Storyville
