= Sort Sol =

Danish rock band

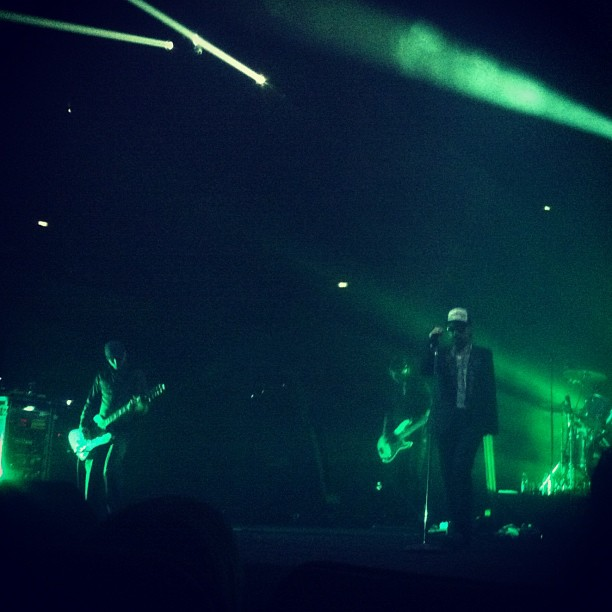
- Sort Sol in 2011 (live concert)

Background information
- Also known as: Sods
- Origin: Copenhagen, Denmark
- Genres: Post-punk
- Years active: 1977–1981 (as Sods); 1981–present (as Sort Sol)
- Label: Universal
- Members: Steen Jørgensen; Lars Top-Galia; Tomas Ortved
- Past members: Knud Odde; Peter Peter (Peter Schneidermann); Morten Versner

Sort Sol is a Danish rock band from Copenhagen, Denmark. The band was formed in 1977 as a punk rock outfit, originally under the name Sods (stylized as SODS). The name Sort Sol was taken in the early 1980s. It translates to English as black sun and is named after a nature phenomenon particular to Denmark, where huge bird flocks gather in the sky and appear to block out the sun.

The Danish press often refers to their musical style as punk due to their origin, though nearly everything they have put out since 1980 is more reminiscent of styles such as post-punk, art-rock, gothic rock and even industrial music.

== History ==
=== Beginnings: Sods ===
Sods was formed in Copenhagen, 1977. The original lineup consisted of: Steen Jørgensen (vocals), Peter Schneidermann (guitar; better known as Peter Peter), Knud Odde (bass) and Tomas Ortved (drums).

The band released their first studio album Minutes to Go in February 1979 which is considered the first Danish punk album. They went on to release Under en sort sol in 1980, a more experimental album, influenced in part by Joy Division, Pere Ubu and Television. T. S. Høeg (saxophone) entered the group for a short while in late 1980.

=== Renaming: Sort Sol ===
In 1981 the group released their first single under the name Sort Sol. The single "Marble Station" (with the b-side "Misguided") is only released in England on 4AD . In March 1981 the group played their first concert outside of Denmark. 1983 saw the release of the album Dagger & Guitar, featuring punk idol Lydia Lunch on two tracks.

In 1985 Lars Top-Galia (guitar, previously in the band ADS) joined the group, and the line-up stayed intact until 1996, when Peter Peter left due to disagreements within the band, partly owing to artistic differences.

In 1988 Sort Sol made the album Everything That Rises Must Converge which has been described as their artistic breakthrough. The album consists of 10 slowpaced tracks that rely heavily on the deep voice of Steen Jørgensen. In 1991 they made their first CD release which was Flow My Firetear. This was the first of their records reaching a broad audience.

They reached their peak popularity three years later with Glamourpuss which by 2002 had sold 122,483 copies in Denmark, more than all their previous records had sold. The Danish hit-movie Nattevagten used three tracks from Glamourpuss on the soundtrack, which contributed to the commercial breakthrough of Sort Sol in Denmark.

In 2004 Lars Top-Galia left the band and Sort Sol's future in jeopardy. Tomas Ortved releases his solo debut Sun Pistol in 2008. All members are known from various musical or art project throughout the years, which can be found listed in Jan Poulsens biography of the band.

In March 2009 rumours of a possible comeback began surfacing. On March 17, the Danish tabloid Ekstra Bladet wrote that Steen Jørgensen have been in contact with all previous Sort Sol members to arrange farewell concerts. However, two days later Lars Top-Galia denied any planned concerts, but confirmed that there have been talks with the old band members. He also said, "It is not unlikely that we could do in the future, but as I said, there are no concrete plans".

In 2011 Sort Sol reunited and toured Denmark with 50 concerts and released The Blackest Box, a collection of all their albums re-mastered and toured again from April–August 2013. Sort Sol are back in the studio recording new material for the first time in over 11 years. With them in the studio was the american producer Randall Dunn who has recorded for bands like Sunn O)), Akron Family and Kinski. In 2017 Sort Sol released Stor langsom stjerne, which was followed by a tour in Denmark.

Internationally renowned artists who have performed and/or recorded with the group include William S. Burroughs, Lydia Lunch, Link Wray, The Jordanaires, Sune Rose Wagner (of The Raveonettes), Sissel Kyrkjebø and Chelsea Wolfe.

== Band members ==
Current members

- Steen Jørgensen – vocals (1977–present)
- Tomas Ortved – drums (1977–present)
- Lars Top-Galia – guitar (1985–2004, 2010–present)

Former members

- Knud Odde – bass (1977–2001)
- Peter Peter (Peter Schneidermann)– guitar (1977–1995)
- Morten Versner - violin (1980–1982)

== Discography ==
=== Studio albums and EPs ===
Year	Album detail	Chart peak DEN
As Sods
1979	Minutes to Go: Recorded: Authem 1978; Label: Medley Records Asp; Formats: LP, CS, CD	
1980	Under en sort sol: Recorded: Nov 1979 and Feb 28th & 29th 1980; Label: Medley Records; Formats: LP, CS, CD	
As Sort Sol
1983	Dagger & Guitar: Recorded: Aug 1983; Label: Medley Records; Formats: LP, CS, CD	
1985	Ruby don't take your love to town: Recorded: Aug 18th & 19th 1985; Label: Medley Records; Formats: LP, CD (EP)	
1987	Everything that rises... must converge!: Label: Medley Records; Formats: LP, CS, CD	
1991	Flow My Firetear: Label: Columbia Records / Sony Music Entertainment Denmark; Formats: LP, CS, CD	
1993	Glamourpuss: Recorded: September 1993; Label: Columbia Records / Sony Music Entertainment Denmark; Formats: LP, CS, CD	
1996	Unspoiled Monsters: Label: Columbia Records / Sony Music Entertainment Denmark; Formats: LP, CD	
1997	Diamond Wind (Limited to 500 copies): Label: Columbia Records; Format: 10" vinyl (EP)	
2001	Snakecharmer: Label: Mercury Records / Universal Music Company; Formats: LP, CD	1
2017	Stor Langsom Stjerne: Label: Columbia Records / Sony Music Entertainment Denmark; Formats: LP, CD	2

=== Compilation albums ===
Year	Album detail	Chart peak DEN
As Sort Sol
1992	Fog Things: Label: Medley Records; Formats: Double Vinyl, CD	
2002	Circle Hits the Flame – Best Off...: Label: Medley Records / Columbia Records / Sony Music; Formats: Double Vinyl, CD	1

=== Box sets ===
- Black Box (1997)
- The Blackest Box (2011)

== Discography (members) ==
Steen Jørgensen

- Ginman/Jørgensen (Steen Jørgensen & Lennart Ginman) (1998)
- Snedronningen (Steen Jørgensen & Lennart Ginman) (2000)
- Standards for Living... (2013)

Tomas Ortved

- Sun Pistol (2008)
- Catch (2012)

== Sources ==
- Poulsen, Jan (2002), Under en Sort Sol - Fra Pisserenden til Statens Museum for kunst, Aschehoug
