= Herbie Steward =

American jazz saxophonist (1926–2003)

- Born: Herbert Bickford Steward; May 7, 1926; Los Angeles, California, U.S.
- Died: August 9, 2003 (aged 77) Clearlake, California, U.S.
- Genres: Jazz; swing
- Instruments: Tenor saxophone; alto saxophone; soprano saxophone
- Years active: 1940s–1960s
- Formerly of: Woody Herman's "The Four Brothers"

Herbert Bickford "Herbie" Steward (May 7, 1926 Los Angeles, California, United States – August 9, 2003 Clearlake, California) was an American jazz saxophonist. He was widely known for being one of the tenor saxophone players in "The Four Brothers", part of Woody Herman's Second Herd.

== Selected discography ==
=== As leader ===
- So Pretty, Äva Records AVA LP6

Recorded in Los Angeles, June 5, 1962
Re-released with all 9 of the 10 cuts on a compilation album: One Brother, Mobile Fidelity (March 19, 1981) OCLC 38363192
Herbie Steward with big band and strings, Dick Hazard, conductor

- The Three Horns of Herbie Steward, Famous Door HL-139 (1981) OCLC 16809746, 474255048

Recorded in San Francisco, March 19, 1981
Herbie Steward (alto sax, clarinet-1, soprano sax-2), Smith Dobson (né Smith Weed Dobson IV; 1947–2001) (piano), Tee Carson (né Tecumseh Donald Carson; 1930–2000) (piano-3), Eddie Duran (né Edward Lozano Duran; born 1925) (guitar), John Mosher (bass), Eddie Moore (drums)

- Herbie's Here, with Gene DiNovi (né Eugene Salvatore Dinovi; born 1928), Marshmallow Exports MYCJ-30069 (Japan) (December 20, 2000)

Recorded live at OZ, Yamagata, Japan, May 23, 1992

- Magical L-I-V-E + Sir Charles Thompson, Marshmallow Exports MYCJ-30115 (October 8, 2001)

Recorded live at Little John, Yokohama, May 21, 1992
Herbie Steward (tenor sax), Sir Charles Thompson (piano), David Young (bass), Yukio Kimura (drums)

- One Morning In May + Gene DiNovi (né Eugene Salvatore Dinovi; born 1928), Marshmallow Exports MMEX-118 (Japan) (2008) OCLC 828200511

Recorded May 19, 1992, Kan Nai Hall, Yokohama
Herbie Steward (tenor saxophone & clarinet), (né Eugene Salvatore Dinovi; born 1928) (piano), Dave Young (bass), Yukio Kimura (drums)

- Saijoh's Serenade, on 3 tracks with Kohnosuke Saijoh, Marshmallow Exports MYCJ-30083 (May 23, 1992)

Recorded May 22, 1992
Kohnosuke Saijoh (tenor sax), Herbie Steward (tenor sax), (né Eugene Salvatore Dinovi; born 1928) (piano), David Young (bass), Yukio Kimura (drums)

=== As sideman ===
With Serge Chaloff, Al Cohn, and Zoot Sims

- The Four Brothers... Together Again! (Vik, 1957)

With Stan Kenton

- Popular Favorites by Stan Kenton (Capitol, 1953)
