= Marshmallow Records & Marshmallow Exports =

Marshmallow Records
- Founded: 1978
- Founder: Mitsuo Johfu
- Distributor(s): Marshmallow Exports
- Genre: Jazz
- Country of origin: Japan
- Location: Oguchidori, Kanagawa-ku; Yokohama, Kanagawa
- Official website: www.marshmallow-records.com

Marshmallow Records & Marshmallow Exports are Japanese companies, the former an independent jazz record label and the latter the label's distributor.

The label was established in 1978 by Mitsuo Johfu, a jazz enthusiast and owner of a clothing store. For more than forty-six years, Johfu has recorded jazz musicians including Chet Baker, Duke Jordan, Jan Lundgren, Carsten Dahl, and Casper Villaume. He also has given recording and distribution rebirth to Gene DiNovi, Sir Charles Thompson, Herbie Steward, and Håkan Rydin.

According to Positive-Feedback, an online audiophile magazine, Johfu values his "Japanese sensibilities" and is highly involved in every recording session, from the choice of songs to sound engineering and packaging. The review states that Johfu travels throughout the world to be at most recording sessions and he takes all the photographs that appear on his CD packaging. He still is a long-time owner and full-time manager of a Yokohama clothing store named Study Hall.
