= Lennart Ginman =

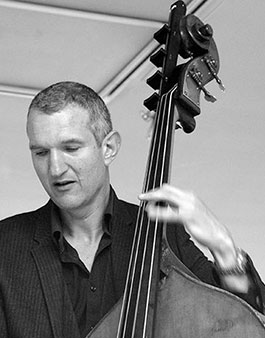
Lennart Ginman

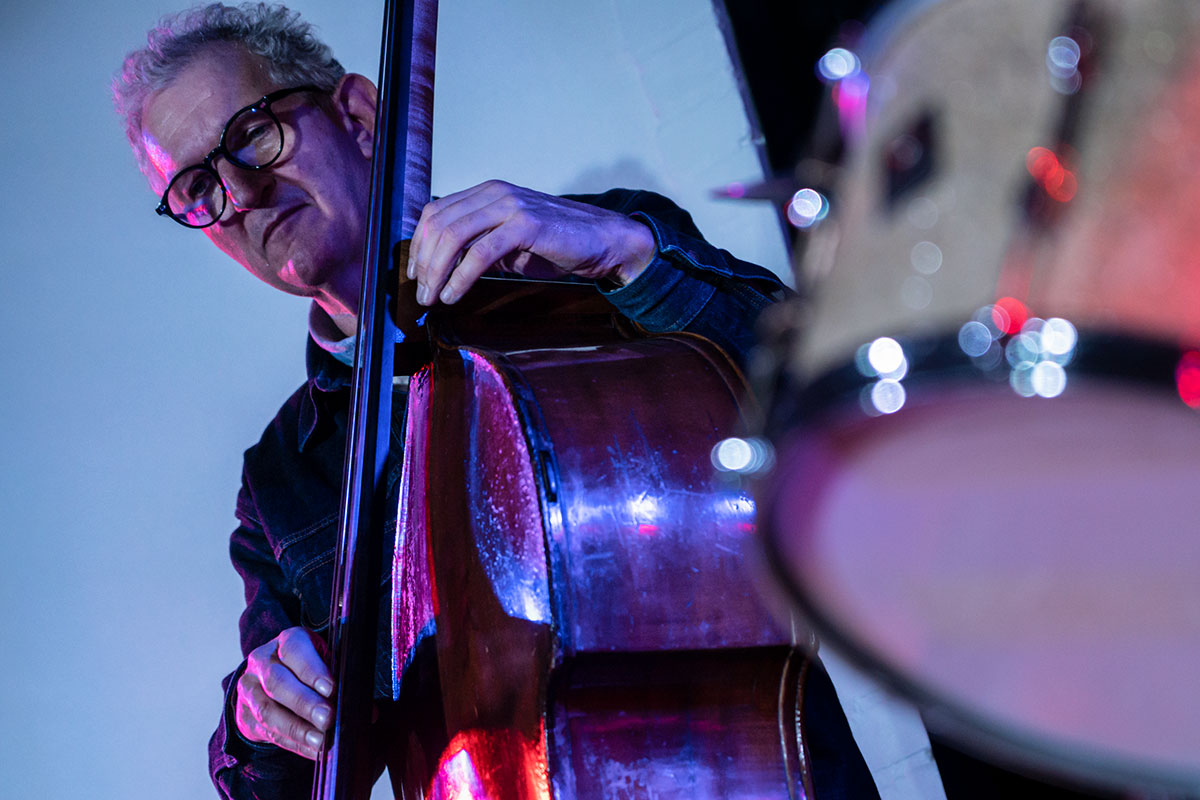
Denmark 2022 Photo Hreinn Gudlaugsson

Lennart Ginman (born March 1960) is a Danish-Finnish bassist, composer and music producer. He has cooperated with artists like Steen Jørgensen, lead singer of Sort Sol in two joint albums, and Kirk Lightsey, an American jazz pianist with a joint album.

He is part of the trio GinmanBlachmanDahl made up of him on bass, Thomas Blachman on drums and Carsten Dahl on piano. The trio released two albums in 2003 and 2004.

== Discography ==
Albums

Year	Album title	Credited to
1988	Beatin' Bop	
1990	1991	Kirk Lightsey & Lennart Ginman
1991	Live at Ronnie Scotts	
1998	Ginman/Jørgensen	Steen Jørgensen & Lennart Ginman
2000	Snedronningen	Steen Jørgensen & Lennart Ginman
2003	GinmanBlachmanDahl: The library bar concerts	Lennart Ginman, Thomas Blachman, Carsten Dahl
2004	GinmanBlachmanDahl	Lennart Ginman, Thomas Blachman, Carsten Dahl
2007	Deep	Lennart Ginman
2014	The Color of Dark	Lennart Ginman & Eivør Pálsdóttir (album credited to Ginman/Eivør)

== Awards and nominations ==
- 1991 – Won the Danish Music Awards, for playing bass: Thomas Blachman & the X-traditional Values, “Love Boat”
- 1995 – Won the Danish Music Awards, for playing bass: Jen Winther’s Quartet, “The Planets”
- 1995 – Won the Jasa Prize (givet af Danmark’s jazz journalistser og kritikere).
- 1999 – Won the Danish Music Awards in the category “Danish Producer of the Year” (Lennart Ginman)
- 1999 – Won the Danish Music Awards in the category “Danish Album of the Year” (Ginman/Jørgensen)
- 1999 – The album “Ginman/Jørgensen” received several recognitions, i.e. it was chosen to be Danish Album of the Year by four Danish new papers and by the Danish music magazine Gaffa.
- 2002 – Icelandic Grammy together with Sigurdur Flosason, “Stairway To The Stars”
- 2008 – Nominated the Steppeulv Award in the category “Musician of the Year”
- 2008 – Received 3-year grant from Statens Kunstfond
- 2009 – Won the Danish Ben Webster Prize

== See also ==
- List of Danish composers
