= Unspoiled Monsters =

Studio album by Sort Sol
- Released: 1996
- Recorded: 1996
- Genres: Alternative rock, trip hop
- Length: 49:58
- Label: Columbia
- Producers: Ian Caple and Sort Sol

Sort Sol chronology
Glamourpuss (1993)	Unspoiled Monsters (1996)	Snakecharmer (2001)

Unspoiled Monsters is the seventh album by the Danish alternative rock act Sort Sol and the fifth after the renaming of the band from the earlier Sods. It is the first without the original member Peter Peter, as he left the band before pre-production of the album. The album is a departure from Sort Sol's earlier albums, being less aggressive and much more experimental, incorporating programmed beats and greater number of keyboards. The songs are less melodic and more based on atmosphere.

A 'first-run' limited edition of 'Unspoiled Monsters' was released and it was the first ever music CD released in Europe, containing an interactive multimedia presentation. The limited edition presentation contained a series of videos - one from a photo shoot in Poland and one personal presentation of each member, shot by the members themselves.

== Track listing ==
1. Untitled - 5:05 (Jørgensen/Top-Galia)
2. Sharks Capital - 5:02 (Jørgensen/Top-Galia)
3. My Stars - 4:46 (Jørgensen/Top-Galia)
4. Anything That Moves - 4:09 (Odde)
5. Kiss The Streets - 4:41 (Jørgensen/Top-Galia)
6. Sol 66 - 4:17 (Odde)
7. The Painter - 4:35 (Odde/Odde, Top-Galia)
8. Tall Ships - 5:56 (Jørgensen/Top-Galia)
9. Mystery Summer - 4:50 (Odde)
10. Erlkönig - 6:37 (Jørgensen/Top-Galia)

== Personnel ==
Sort Sol

- Lars Top-Galia – guitar
- Knud Odde – bass guitar
- Steen Jørgensen – vocals
- Tomas Ortved – drums

Additional musicians and production

- Wili Jønsson – additional bass guitar, backing vocals and mellotron
- Natalia Feinberg – on "Untitled" and "Sharks Capital"
- Henrik Liebgott – on "My Stars"
- Louisiana Museum Art Ensemble – strings on "Sol 66" and "My Stars"
- Rosie Lindsell – arranging and conducting on "Sol 66" and "My Stars"
- Ian Caple – production, mixing and engineering
- Tim Young – mastering
- Flemming "Doom" Rasmussen – assisting engineering
- Martin Hansen Andersen – Design and production of limited edition presentation
