= Mie Olise Kjærgaard =

Danish artist (born 1974)

- Kjærgaard in July 2007
- Born: Mie Olise Kjærgaard; 1974 (age 51–52)
- Website: www.mieolise.com

Mie Olise Kjærgaard (born 1974) is a Danish artist.

== Career ==
Kjærgaard attended the St. Martin's School of Art in London from which she received her MFA in 2007, where she was one of the four finalists in the BBC television arranged Four New Sensations. In 2009 her work was the subject of a one-woman exhibition entitled "The Exquisite Capabilities of The flying Carpet", at the Skive New Museum of Contemporary Art, in Skive, Denmark. Kjærgaard is living and working in Copenhagen. She paints large scale paintings of women, seen through a woman's eye (female gaze) and view herself as a feminist.

In 2013, Kjærgaard painted with muck recovered from the Gowanus Canal. She had a one-woman exhibition in 2014 at the Museo de Arte Acarigua-Araure in Venezuela. In 2015, Kjærgaard's "Noplacia" was exhibited at the Samuel Freeman Gallery. "Noplacia," is a term pulled from opening of Thomas Moore's Utopia, and, according to Kathleen Whitney, writing for Sculpture, the exhibit is "distinguished by abandoned, dystopian, and desolated architectural spaces." Whitney goes on to suggest that Kjærgaard's "structures imply that nothing is fixed or stable, that everything is contingent."

Kjærgaard has had solo shows at Honor Fraser, Los Angeles; Sammlung Philara, Düsseldorf; MUPO Oacaxa; Y Gallery, New York; Duve Berlin; as well as participating in exhibitions at MFAH (Museum of Fine Arts Houston), MUPO (Museum of Contemporary Art Utah), Torrance Art Museum, Los Angeles; Nikolaj Kunsthal, Copenhagen and Trapholt Museum, Denmark.
