= Håkan Rydin =

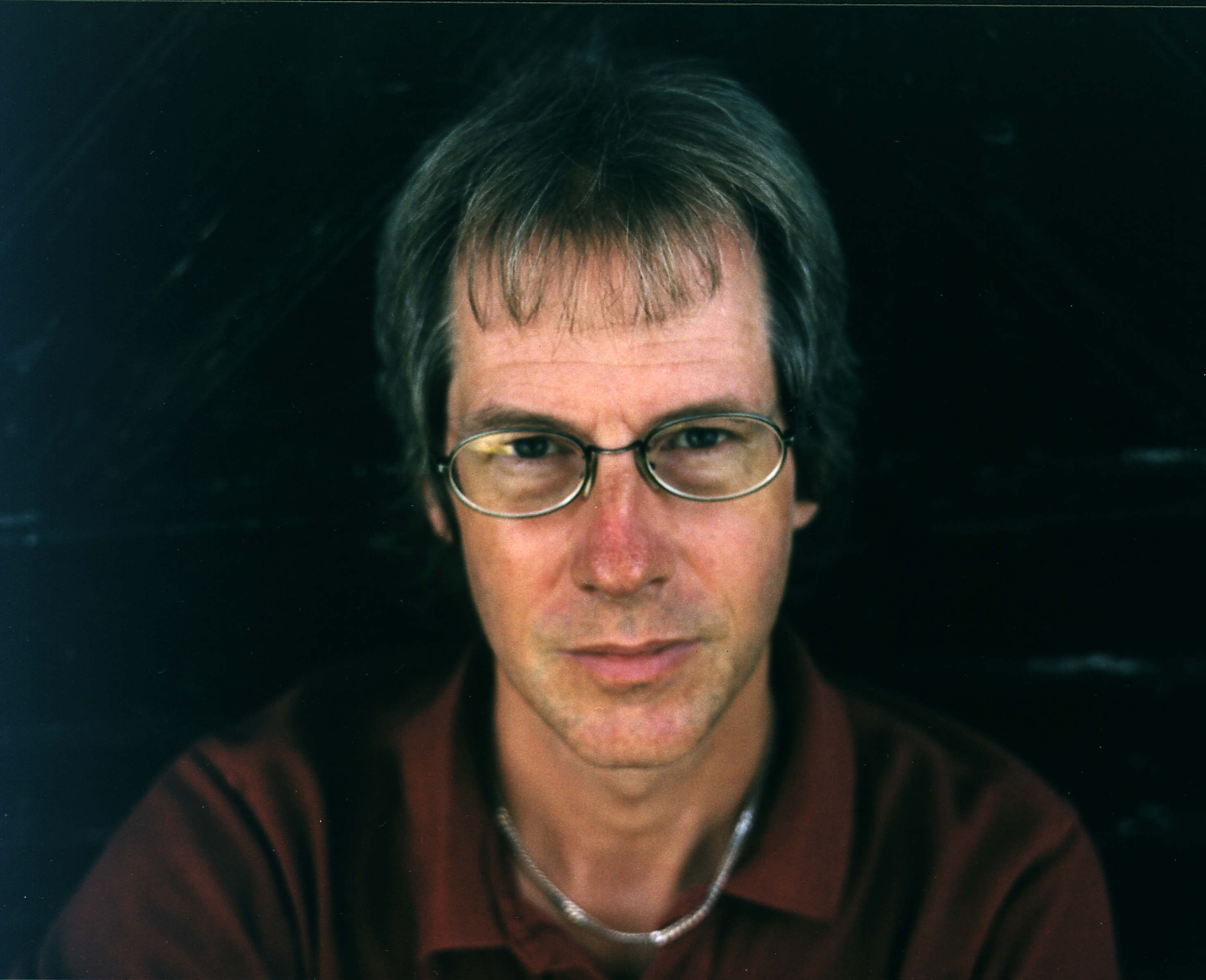
- Håkan Rydin, 2005

Background information
- Born: Håkan Andersson Rydin; January 4, 1951 (age 75); Gislaved, Småland, Sweden
- Genre: Jazz
- Occupations: Musician, songwriter, music arranger, professor
- Instrument: Piano
- Years active: 1970–present
- Labels: Marshmallow Records, previously on FLC
- Website: hakanrydin.com

Håkan Andersson Rydin (born January 4, 1951, in Gislaved, Sweden) is a jazz pianist living in Malmö, Sweden.

With Jörgen Nilsson – and later Ulf Rådelius and Anders Lagerlöf – he formed the jazz group (Swedish) Nexus, which during its existence between 1972 and 1992 performed over 1000 concerts. They made three records and performed on international jazz festivals, in radio and TV in several counties.

Between 1988 and 2003 Rydin played with American singer Kim Parker, the stepdaughter of the jazz legend Charlie Parker, all over the world.

The piano style of Håkan Rydin has been described as "lyrical and cooking" and he has performed with Thad Jones, Pepper Adams, Red Mitchell, Etta Cameron, Enrico Rava, Tim Hagans, Georgie Fame, David Liebman and Swedish Jazz stars like Jan Allan, Arne Domnérus, Helge Albin, Anders Bergcrantz, Christer Boustedt, Bernt Rosengren and Svante Thuresson.

In recent years Rydin has mostly performed in the classical piano trio format (piano, bass and drums). 2010 he was the first jazz musician to perform in the Great Theatre (NCPA) in Beijing.

Rydin has published two books (in Swedish) on playing piano by ear, with colleague Dage Jonsson.

2013–2018 he was Professor of Jazz Piano at the Malmö Academy of Music.

== Discography ==
=== As a leader or co-leader ===
- 2020 – Nexus in Montreal (AdOpen)
- 2019 – Melodies... (AdOpen)
- 2007 – A Splendored Thing with Elisabeth Melander (Sittel)
- 2005 – Tender Silhouette (Marshmallow Records)
- 1997 – A Beautiful Friendship with Kim Parker (FLC)
- 1987 – Nexus in Canada (FLC)
- 1984 – Nexus meets Enrico Rava (FLC)
- 1978 – Nexus (FLC)
- 1978 – Nexus First (SweDisc Jazz)

=== Other recordings ===
- 2017 – Elisabeth Melander: "Reflections of a Voice" (Prophone)
- 2003 – Lasse O: "A Tribute to Red" with Red Mitchell (hi-hat records)
- 2002 – Gitte Pålsson & Håkan Rydin: "Novemberljus" (GPCD)
- 1999 – Ulf Rådelius: "Connection" (URCD)
- 1979 – Lasse O: "Speglingar" (GoodWill)
