= Everything That Rises Must Converge (album) =

Everything That Rises...Must Converge!

Studio album by Sort Sol
- Released: 1987
- Label: Medley Records
- Producer: 4-Eyed Thomas (Ulf Lundquist)

Sort Sol chronology
Dagger & Guitar (1983)	Everything That Rises...Must Converge! (1987)	Flow My Firetear (1991)

Everything That Rises...Must Converge! is the fourth album by the Danish rock act Sort Sol (aka Sods) and the second after renaming of the band.

The album name comes from the title of a short story by the American writer Flannery O'Connor. The album was released in 1987 and showed another change of direction for the group. Before the recording of the album, the second guitarist Lars Top-Galia had joined the group, which caused the band's sound to develop into a more hard edged, hard rocking sound, followed by immediate musical sparks between Top-Galia and the group's other guitarist, Peter Peter Schneidermann, who soon named themselves the "Evil Twins".

In 1997, the album was reissued with a whole disc of outtakes and B-sides called "The Violent Bear It Away", which was intended to be the title of the album and is also the title of a short story by O'Connor. This extra disc has a re-recording of the song "As She Weeps" from the Dagger & Guitar album, but on this version, it is sung by the lead singer Steen Jørgensen instead of the American Lydia Lunch who sung lead vocals on the original version. It also contains a cover version of T.Rex's "Children of the Revolution".

== Reception & impact ==
The album received little coverage at the time of its release.

One critic identified a Nick Cave influence on this album.

== Track listing ==
1. "Ode to Billie Joe" - 7:07 (Bobbie Gentry)
2. "A Knife for the Ladies" - 2:51 (Jørgensen, Top Galia)
3. "Shapes of Summer" - 3:23 (Odde/Odde, Schneidermann)
4. "Abyss Revisited" - 3:09 (Odde/Schneidermann, Jørgensen, Ortved)
5. "Angelus Novus" - 2:01 (Odde)
6. "Fire Engine" - 3:19 (Hall, Sutherland, Erickson; arranged by Ortved and Sort Sol)
7. "Searching Down the Block" - 3:31 (Odde)
8. "Midget Finger" - 4:46 (Odde/Odde, Jørgensen)
9. "Pinocchio Loose" - 3:25 (Odde/Schneidermann)
10. "Marguerita" - 2:23 (Don Robertson)

"The Violent Bear It Away"

1. "Black Sabbath" - 5:33 (Black Sabbath)
2. "Blood in the Saddle" - 2:29 (Tex Ritter)
3. "Children of the Revolution" (Marc Bolan) - 2:32
4. "Hurricane Fighter Plane" - 4:06 (Mayo Thompson, Steve Cunningham, Frederick Barthelme)
5. "Interpreter" - 2:39 (Roky Erickson)
6. "As She Weeps" - 7:24 (lyrics: Lydia Lunch; music: Sort Sol)
7. "Indian Summer" - 4:49 (Valentin Jørgensen, Lars Hybel)

== Personnel ==
Sort Sol

- Lars Top-Galia – guitar
- Peter Peter – lead guitar
- Steen Jørgensen – vocals
- Knud Odde – bass guitar
- Tomas Ortved – drums

Additional musicians and production

- Elisabeth G. Nielsen – backing vocals on "A Knife For The Ladies"
- Flemming Nygaard Madsen – cello on "A Knife For The Ladies"
- Torsten "Metalstein" Hvas – handclaps
- 4-eyed Thomas – production
- Thomas Brekling – mixing
- Ulf Lindqvist – mixing
- Peter Brander – engineering
- Flemming Naumann – engineering
