= Valhalla Rising (film) =

- Theatrical release poster
- Directed by: Nicolas Winding Refn
- Written by: Nicolas Winding Refn; Roy Jacobsen
- Produced by: Johnny Andersen; Bo Ehrhardt; Henrik Danstrup
- Starring: Mads Mikkelsen
- Cinematography: Morten Søborg
- Edited by: Mat Newman
- Music by: Peter Peter; Peter Kyed
- Production company: Nimbus Film Productions
- Distributed by: Scanbox Entertainment
- Release dates: 4 September 2009 (Venice); 31 March 2010 (Denmark)
- Running time: 92 minutes
- Country: Denmark
- Language: English
- Budget: $5.7 million
- Box office: $731,613

Valhalla Rising is a 2009 English-language Danish period adventure film directed by Nicolas Winding Refn, co-written by Refn and Roy Jacobsen, and starring Mads Mikkelsen. The film takes place "most certainly during the twelfth century of our era", and follows a Norse warrior named One-Eye and a boy as they travel with a band of Christian Crusaders by ship in the hopes of finding the Holy Land.

Shot entirely in Scotland, the title is derived from the combination of Kenneth Anger's films Scorpio Rising and Lucifer Rising with a Viking theme. While the film garnered generally positive reviews, it only made back about $731,613 of its $5.7 million production cost.

== Plot ==
In 12th century Scandinavian Scotland, a mysterious mute one-eyed thrall is held captive by a Norwegian chieftain from Sutherland and forced to fight to the death against others. He receives his meals from a young thrall boy, who seems to sympathise with him. After dreaming of finding an arrowhead in a pool, One-Eye actually finds it when bathing. Using the arrowhead, he breaks free, kills the chieftain and his entourage and impales the chieftain's head on a nithing pole. As he sets out across the land, he realizes that the boy is following him. 'One-Eye' takes him in and has a vision of them travelling on a ship. They reach a small group of Christian Norsemen who are persecuting the heathens of Scotland. The leader of the group asks the boy about the man's origins and he answers that One-Eye came from Hel. 'One-Eye' and the boy agree to sail with them to the Holy Land on a Crusade. The expedition soon encounters thick fog and gets lost in the North Atlantic. After many days, with supplies dwindling, land is sighted.

Sailing up a river, they are attacked by Skrælings armed with stone arrowheads. The party realises they are nowhere near the Holy Land. Their leader, a Christian zealot, nevertheless advocates conquering the locals and claiming the land in the name of God. 'One-Eye' has a vision of him building a cairn, as one of his travelling companion was being violently sodomized into a peat bog by his fellow traveller, as the boy watches on in horror. Some of the group members angrily blame 'One-Eye' for their predicament and attack him; he kills them in self-defence. 'One-Eye' and the boy then leave and walk into the forest, followed by the group's second in command who has been stabbed by the leader for choosing to follow them. The leader's son then arrives to follow, as the leader stays behind to be killed by arrows. As the remainder of the group reaches the peak of a mountain, the son asks 'One-Eye' why he had to go through the horrible journey, but receives no answer. The leader's son decides to go back to his father, and the second in command is left on the mountain. Their eventual fate is unknown.

'One-Eye' and the boy eventually reach the coastline and are met by over a dozen clay-covered warriors. 'One-Eye' regards them knowingly, having seen them in a vision. He silently bids the boy goodbye, then walks into the middle of the tribesmen. He drops his axe and his knife and closes his eye. One warrior fells him with one blow to the back of the head, and the others finish him off. 'One-Eye's' spirit walks into the estuary next to his cairn and disappears below the surface. On the beach, the remaining tribe members quietly withdraw back into the forest, leaving the boy looking out at the ocean. The sky darkens, becoming that of the misty Highlands of the beginning of the film, and 'One-Eye's' face appears in the clouds.

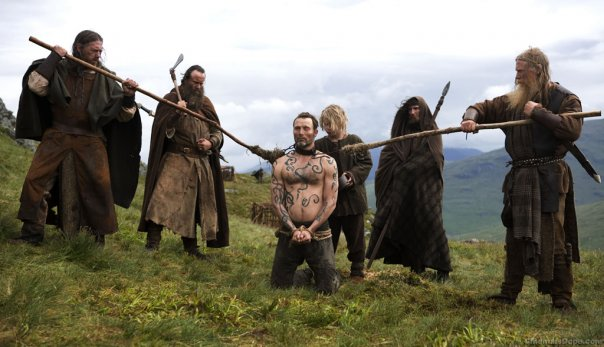
Scene with Mads Mikkelsen and Maarten Stevenson

== Cast ==
Nicolas Winding Refn deliberately did not give formal names to the film's characters, save for One-Eye, although it is not the character's real name but a moniker given by The Boy. Names were assigned in the script to differentiate parts. This article addresses the characters as they are addressed by Refn on the DVD-commentary.

- Mads Mikkelsen as One-Eye
- Maarten Stevenson as The Boy
- Ewan Stewart as The General
- Gary Lewis as The Priest
- Alexander Morton as The Chieftain
- Jamie Sives as The General's Son
- Stewart Porter as The Chieftain's Son
- Gordon Brown as Christian Viking
- Gary McCormack as Lost Viking
- Charlie Allan as Viking

== Release ==
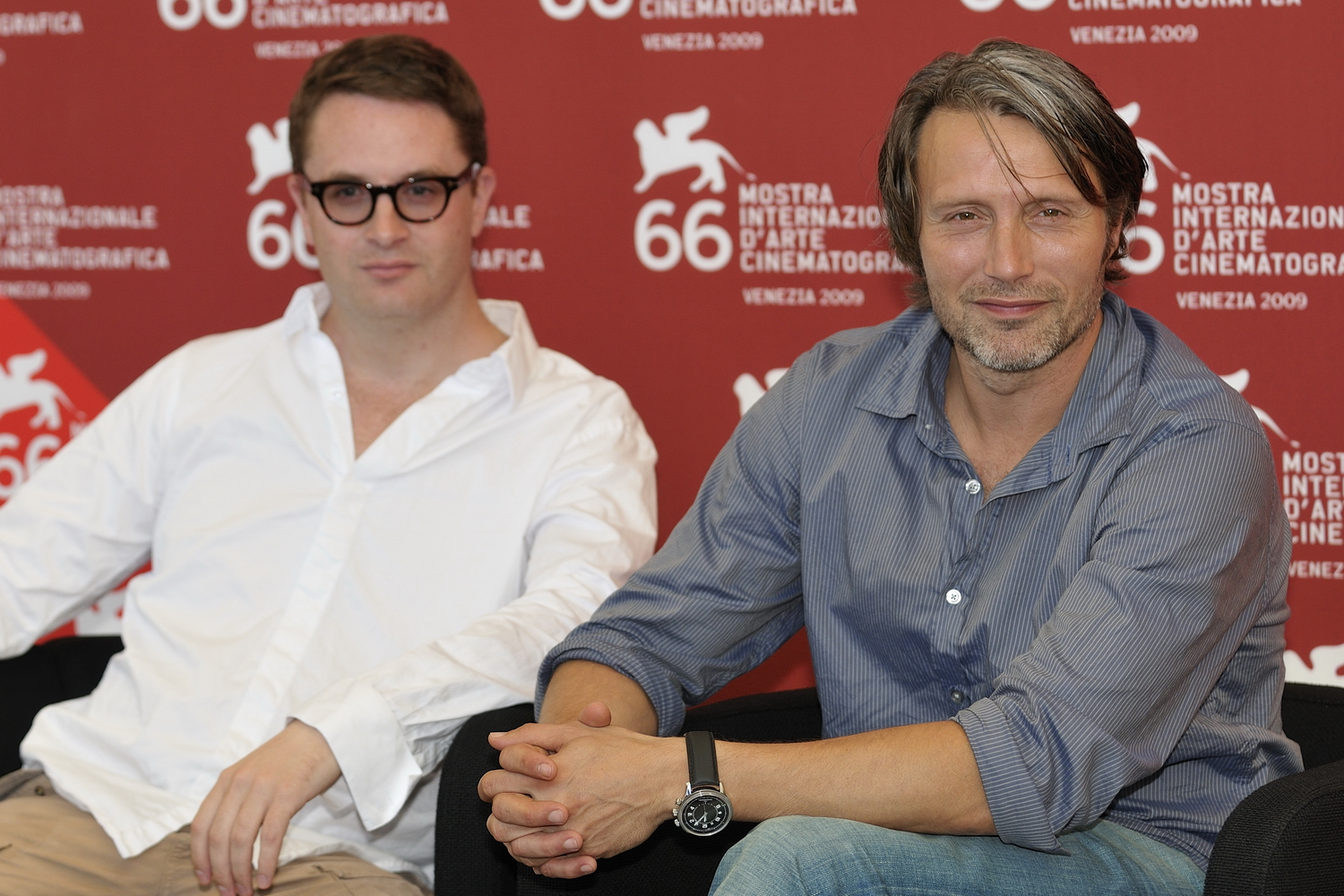
Nicolas Winding Refn and Mads Mikkelsen at the Venice Film Festival for the premiere of the film

The film premiered at the 66th Venice International Film Festival where it was shown out of competition on 4 September 2009. The Danish premiere followed on 31 March 2010. Vertigo Films released it in the United Kingdom on 30 April the same year.

== Reception ==
On the review aggregator website Rotten Tomatoes, 70% of 60 critics' reviews are positive, with an average rating of 6.8/10. The website's consensus reads: "Visually gripping and anchored by a magnetic Mads Mikkelsen, Valhalla Rising delves into violence and faith in brutally uncompromising fashion." Metacritic gives the film a "generally favorable" average score of 61% based on reviews from 15 critics.

The reaction from Danish critics was split. Berlingske Tidende gave the film a rating of two out of six stars, calling it "unbearably self-important". Conversely, B.T. called the film a masterpiece and gave it a perfect score of six out of six.

Philip French wrote in his review in The Observer that the film felt "like watching woad dry, but hypnotic, densely atmospheric in a portentous way, and weirdly beautiful."

== Soundtrack ==
The score of the film was composed by Refn's frequent collaborators Peter Peter and Peter Kyed. Originally Refn had intended Mogwai as the composers of the score. The soundtrack was commercially released on 7 October 2013 by Milan Records who also released the score to Refn's films Only God Forgives and The Neon Demon. The soundtrack contains the complete score and sections of the soundscapes sound designers Giles Lamb and Douglas MacDougall created for the film. Some sites incorrectly credits the track Free to Giles Lamb & Douglas MacDougall and the track Christians to Peter Peter.

Track listing

1. "Introduction" – Peter Peter & Peter Kyed (1:03)
2. "Caged" – Giles Lamb & Douglas MacDougall (1:41)
3. "One Eye Fights" – Giles Lamb & Douglas MacDougall (0:53)
4. "Montage" – Peter Peter & Peter Kyed (4:22)
5. "Arrowhead" – Giles Lamb & Douglas MacDougall (4:19)
6. "Escape" – Peter Peter & Peter Kyed (1:02)
7. "Return" – Peter Peter & Peter Kyed (3:03)
8. "Free" – Peter Peter (1:56)
9. "Christians" – Giles Lamb & Douglas MacDougall (4:03)
10. "Men of God" – Peter Kyed & Peter Peter (4:49)
11. "The Boat" – Peter Peter & Peter Kyed (12:02)
12. "Into Hell" – Peter Peter & Peter Kyed (3:40)
13. "Hell" – Peter Peter & Peter Kyed (9:34)
14. "Forest'" – Giles Lamb & Douglas MacDougall (2:14)
15. "Valhalla Rising (End Credits)" – Peter Peter & Peter Kyed (5:33)

== See also ==
- Survival film
- Pre-Columbian transoceanic contact theories
