= Under en sort sol =

Studio album by Sods
- Released: 1980
- Genre: Post-punk
- Label: Medley Records
- Producers: Michael Ritto, Werner Scherrer

Sods chronology
Minutes To Go (1979)	Under en sort sol (1980)	Dagger & Guitar (1983)

Under en sort sol is the second album by the Danish rock band Sods, later known as Sort Sol. The album was recorded over two days in 1980 and released the same year. With this album, the group moved away from the punchy 1-2-3-4 punk, and into more experimental post-punk. To mark the change the band name was not written anywhere on the cover.

The album was reissued in 1997 with bonus tracks.

== Track listing ==
All songs by Sods (except where noted)

1. "Repeature"
2. "Ice-Age For A While"
3. "Walking On Red"
4. "Conflict"
5. "Roller Ball"
6. "Marble Station" (Søren Ulrik Thomsen, Sods)
7. "Misguided"
8. "Eveningsong" (Jesper Reisinger, Sods)

1997 re-release bonus tracks

9. "Il Zone"
10. "Off Morning"
11. "Irene The Doorbell"

== Personnel ==
Sods

- Tomas Ortved – drums
- Knud Odde – bass guitar
- Peter Peter – guitar
- Steen Jørgensen – vocals, pocket trumpet

Additional musicians and production

- Lars H.U.G. – lead vocals, second guitar on "Eveningsong"
- Morten Versner – violin on "Marble Station"
- Per Due – second guitar on "Misguided"
- Michael Ritto – production
- Werner Scherrer – production
