= Dagger & Guitar =

Studio album by Sort Sol
- Released: 1983
- Recorded: August 1983
- Studio: Custom Sound Lab, Copenhagen, Denmark
- Label: Medley Records
- Producer: Chris Butler

Sort Sol chronology
Under en sort sol (1980)	Dagger & Guitar (1983)	Everything That Rises Must Converge (1987)

Dagger & Guitar is the 1983 third album by the Danish rock band Sort Sol (previously Sods) and the first of their records to carry the new name Sort Sol.

The album was, when it was released, often seen as the first "commercial" album for the band as it contained more listenable and catchier songs than the two previous albums. It was produced by the American producer Chris Butler. As with the previous records this was too reissued in 1997, though with a new cover.

== Track listing ==
All songs by Sort Sol (except where noted)

1. "Abyss" – 3:48
2. "White Shirt" – 3:08
3. "Excalibur" – 1:46
4. "Boy - Girl" – 2:39 (Torsten Høegh, Sort Sol)
5. "Boy in the Fire" – 2:26
6. "Off Morning" – 2:48
7. "Written Story" – 3:05
8. "Stuck to My Gun" – 2:48
9. "Framelding" – 3:32
10. "As She Weeps" – 7:55 (lyrics: Lydia Lunch; music: Sort Sol)

1997 re-release bonus tracks

9. "El Toro" - 3:28 (Bill Giant, Bernie Baum, Florence Kaye)
10. "I Heard a Forest Praying" - 2:25 (Sam Lewis, Peter de Rose)
11. "The Sun Ain't Gonna Shine Anymore" - 3:18 (Bob Crowe, Bob Gaudio)
12. "Ruby Don't Take Your Love to Town" - 3:04 (Mel Tillis)

== Personnel ==
Sort Sol

- Peter Peter – guitar
- Tomas Ortved – drums
- Knud Odde – bass guitar
- Steen Jørgensen – vocals, pocket trumpet

Additional musicians and production

- Morten Versner – violin on "Off Morning"
- Lydia Lunch – duet on "Boy-Girl" and lead vocals on "As She Weeps"
- Mogens Bjergby – engineering
- Chris Butler – production
