= Ryding =

Ryding is a surname. Notable people with the surname include:

- Axel Ryding (1831–1897), Swedish Army lieutenant general
- Dave Ryding (born 1986), British alpine skier
- Edvin Ryding (born 2003), Swedish actor
- Göran Ryding (1916–2007), Swedish diplomat
- Graham Ryding (born 1975), Canadian squashplayer
- Wayne Ryding, Australian-born British Paralympic swimmer
- Yvonne Ryding (born 1962), Swedish beauty queen, Miss Universe 1984
