= Lars Ravn =

Danish artist

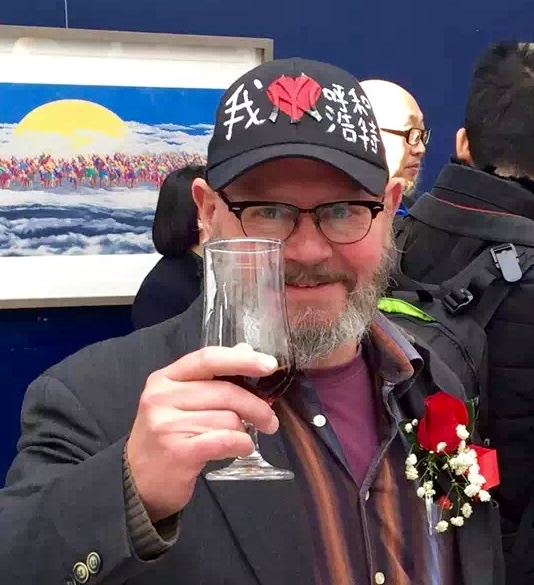
Lars Ravn

Lars Søren Ravn (born 1959 in Aalborg) is an autodidact Danish artist. Lars Ravn is a member of Danish Art Association Corner.

== See also ==
- Danish art
