= Maria Faust =

Estonian saxophonist and composer

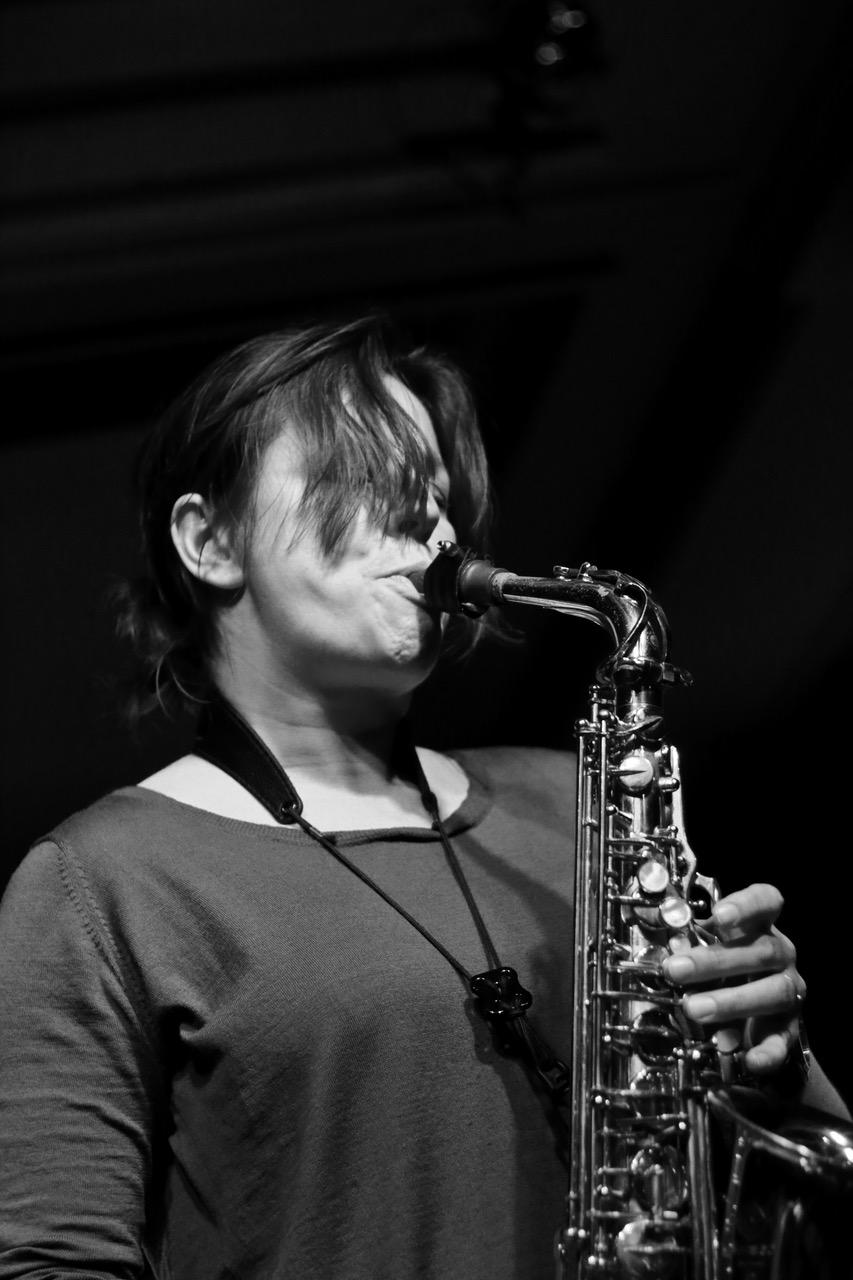
- Maria Faust live at Tallinn Music Week, March 2014

Background information
- Born: April 18, 1979 (age 47); Kuressaare, then part of Estonian SSR, Soviet Union
- Genres: Jazz, improvised music
- Occupations: Musician, composer
- Instrument: Saxophone
- Website: mariafaust.com

Maria Faust (born 18 April 1979) is an Estonian jazz saxophonist. She has worked with John Parish and Mark Howard. She frequently tours in western Europe and has performed in the Balkan Peninsula, South America, China, and Russia.

== Galleri ==
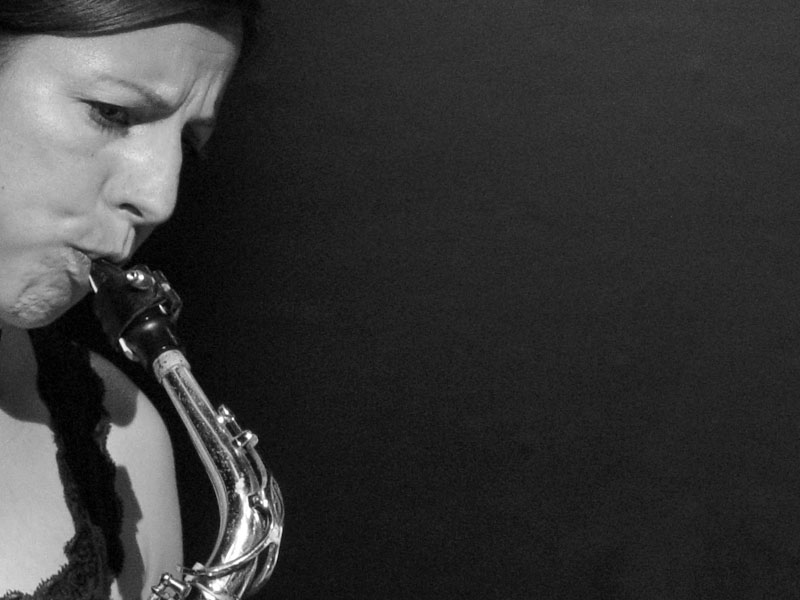
Aarhus Jazz Festival 2012

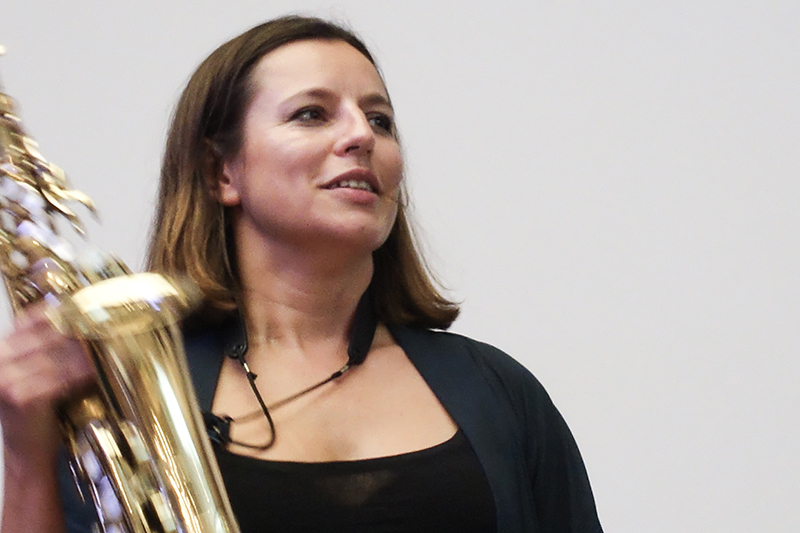
Aarhus Jazz Festival 2016

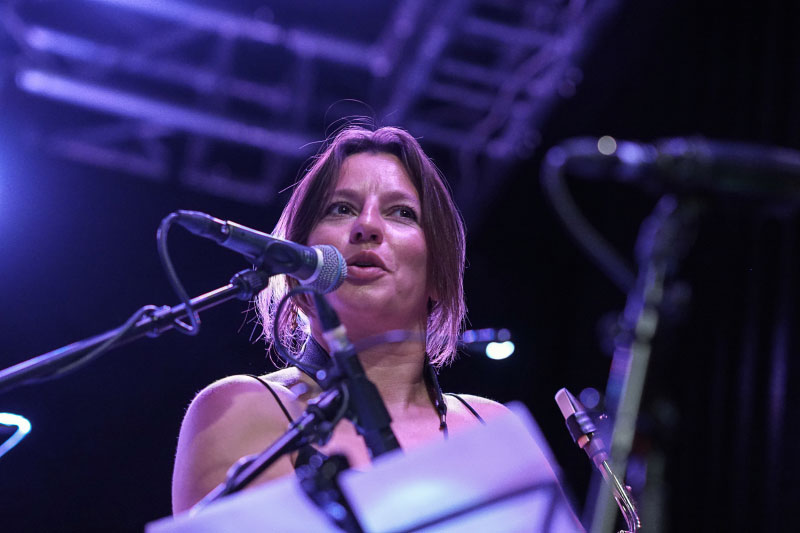
Aarhus Jazz Festival 2018

== Awards and honors ==
- BMW Welt Jazz Awards nominee 2019
- Nominated to Danish Music Awards 2018 in category "Composer of the year" (Maria Faust Machina)
- Winner of Danish critics price "Steppeulven 2018" in category "Composer of the year" (Kira Skov/Maria Faust In the Beginning)
- Multiple winner of Danish Music Awards 2017 in categories "Jazz composer of the year" and "Vocal Jazz album of the year" (Kira Skov/Maria Faust "In the Beginning")
- Danske Jazz Award Jazzkaar 2016
- Minister of the Danish Culture Niels Mattiasen's Mindelegat 2016
- Multiple winner of Danish Music Awards 2014 in categories "Jazz Composer of the Year" and "Cross over album of the year" 2014 (Maria Faust Sacrum Facere)
- Nominated to Estonian Music Awards in category "Jazz Album of the Year " in 2014 and 2015
- Nominated to Danish Music Awards 2013 in category " Composer of the year" (Maria Faust Jazz Catastrope)

== Discography ==
- Bitchslap Boogie (Barefoot, 2008)
- Warrior Horse (Barefoot, 2010)
- Maria Faust Jazz Catastrophe (Barefoot, 2013)
- Maria Faust Sacrum Facere (Barefoot, 2014)
- In the Beginning (Stunt, 2017)
- Machina (Stunt, 2018)
- Farm Fresh (Gotta Let It Out, 2019)
- Organ (Stunt, 2020)
- Mass of Mary (Estonian Record Productions, 2022)
