= Peter Peter (Danish musician) =

Danish rock musician

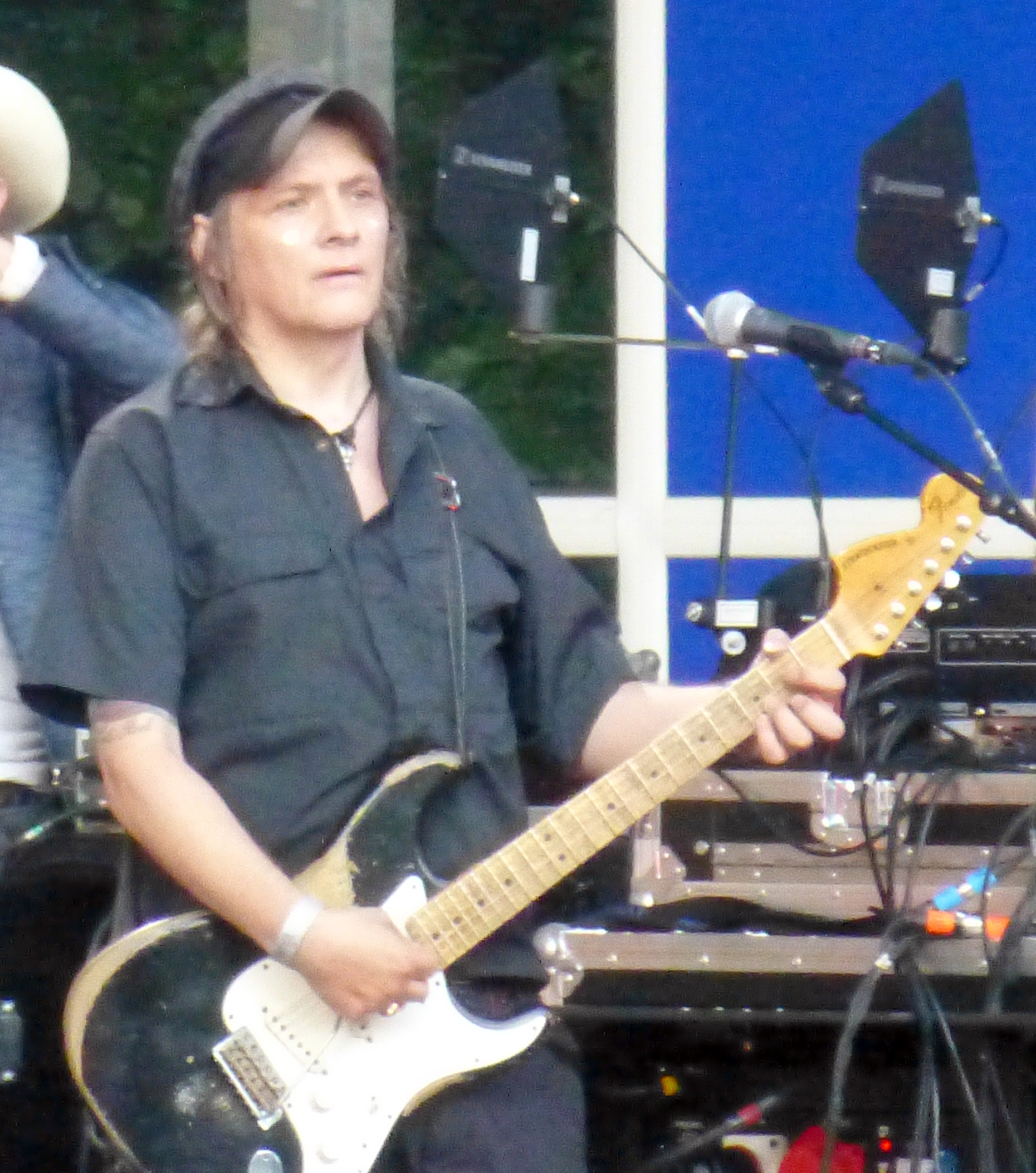

Background information
- Born: Peter Schneidermann; 12 August 1960 (age 66); Bornholm, Denmark
- Genres: Rock
- Occupations: Singer; guitarist
- Instrument: Guitar
- Formerly of: Sort Sol

Peter Schneidermann, better known as Peter Peter, (born 12 August 1960) is a Danish rock musician and former member of the Danish rock band Sort Sol (formerly SODS), before engaging on his own musical projects Bleeder and the Bleeder Group. Peter Peter is also notable for working with filmmaker Nicolas Winding Refn and has written scores and soundtracks for a number of films.

== Biography ==
Schneidermann was born on the island of Bornholm, but the family soon moved to Copenhagen after his birth. As a young man, Peter was very interested in film and music. He got a Hagstrom guitar which he later painted pink. The guitar followed him throughout life, and he has its picture tattooed on his upper arm. He was also into judo and won the Copenhagen Cup Baunehøj Hall. During his judo practices, he met Lars Nybo, who played drums in the band Space-brain, later known as Suck. Steen Jørgensen seeing his potential as a singer invited him in.

== Sods / Sort Sol ==
Soon after the break of Suck, Steen Jørgensen and Peter Schneidermann formed a new band called Sods (stylized as SODS), with Steen's girlfriend Camilla suggesting the name. Later Knud Odde and Tomas Ortved joined the band. Sods released the LPs Minutes to Go and Under En Sort Sol.

SODS was later renamed Sort Sol (meaning Black Sun) and extended with a new member: Lars Top-Galia, who along with Peter came to be known as the "evil twins". The change of name also signified a shift in genre of music they played, moving from thrash punk to a more pop band. In 1993, the band released the album Glamourpuss. However soon after Peter Peter decided to leave the formation in 1995.

== Bleeder / The Bleeder Group ==
In 1995, Peter Peter formed the more punk-oriented band Bleeder, after establishing his own record label I Hate You Records. The debut single was "Knucklehead" followed by the album Psycho Power in 1997. The title track, greatly affected by David Bowie, was filmed by Nicolas Winding Refn starting a long collaboration between Peter Peter and Refn. Another standing out track was a cover of The Osmonds hit "Crazy Horses". In 1996, Bleeder put music to Refn's cult film Pusher. Refn, an avid fan of the band called his second film Bleeder after Peter Peter's new band. Inclusion of singer Charlotte Bagge, known from the underground formation Squirm signalled a new development for Bleeder.

Peter Peter also cooperated with the band Düreforsög producing their album Beach in (1999), also producing Kristian Vester's band Goodiepal. Other Peter Peter projects included the score notably for the film De Skrigende Halse.

In 2000s, Peter Peter launched a new project he called The Bleeder Group (to differentiate from the original Bleeder). The new formation released the greatly acclaimed Sunrise in 2004. Tracks included "The Men Behind the Moon", "It's Just A Game", and "I Know You're Going to Love My Sad Song / About People And What They Do" and a new version of "Knucklehead'.

Peter Peter later devoted most of his time to film music, but also appeared at some festivals like the Copenhagen Jazz Festival alongside Thomas Ortved of the Sort Sol days.

== Other bands and projects ==
Peter Peter has also played on occasions on various bands including:

- Martin and the Martians, a Danish punk band that included Martin Krogh
- Tina Talks, another Danish punk band that included Lars Bo "Tolle" Tolstoy Jacobsen and Tomas Ortved
- Monomania, an experimental pop-punk/rock band that included Pussy Punk (Kate Svanholm), Eddie Haircut (Milan Balsgaard), Vicious Decay (Ann-Christine Gløet) and Sniff Høkerberg
- Pubescent Hysteria, Danish punk band that included Franz De Zaster, Timmy Andersen and Sorte Per.
- He provided music for the promotional material for Kane & Lynch: Dead Men

Other projects he took part in included support (a project of Franz De Zaster), Tapehead. He also wrote for punk fanzine Iklipsx.

Productions included punk/postpunk/art-punk/new wave band Tee Vee Pop and in 2009 Danish punk rock band Iceage from their early start.

== Discography ==
=== With Sods ===
- Minutes to Go (1979)
- Under en sort sol (1980)

=== With Sort Sol ===
- Dagger & Guitar (1983)
- Everything That Rises Must Converge (1987)
- Flow My Firetear (1991)
- Glamourpuss (1994)

=== With Kira Skov ===
- Epiphanies of Grandeur (2012)

== Filmography ==
=== With Nicolas Winding Refn ===
- Pusher (1996)
- Bleeder (1999)
- Pusher 2 (2004)
- Pusher 3 (2005)
- Valhalla Rising (2009)
- Copenhagen Cowboy (2022)

== Sources ==
- Jan Poulsen (born 1962), Under a Black Sun, ISBN 87-11-11591-2
