= Glamourpuss (album) =

Album by Sort Sol

Studio album by Sort Sol
- Released: 1993
- Recorded: 1993
- Genre: Rock, alternative rock
- Length: 39:53
- Label: Columbia
- Producer: Flemming Rasmussen and Sort Sol

Sort Sol chronology
Flow My Firetear (1991)	Glamourpuss (1993)	Unspoiled Monsters (1996)

Glamourpuss is the sixth album by the Danish rock band Sort Sol and the fourth after the renaming from the earlier name Sods. It is their most commercially successful to date, and includes their biggest hit "Let Your Fingers Do The Walking". It is also the last to be recorded with the original member Peter Peter, who left the band after touring in support of the album.

== Track listing ==
1. "Dog Star Man" - 4:09 (Odde/Ortved, PP, S. Jørgensen, T. Tholstoy, Top-Galia)
2. "Popcorn" - 4:19 (S. Jørgensen/Odde, Ortved, PP, Top-Galia)
3. "Let Your Fingers Do The Walking" - 4:40 (S. Jørgensen/Top-Galia)
4. "Sleepwalker" - 3:41 (Odde/Klavs K, Ortved, PP)
5. "Shaheeba Bay" - 4:03 (Odde/Odde, Ortved, S. Jørgensen, Top-Galia)
6. "Written in the Wind" - 5:11 (Odde)
7. "Eileen Alphabet" - 2:10 (Odde/Odde, PP)
8. "Bangalore Flow" - 7:37 (S. Jørgensen/Top-Galia)
9. "Lady of the Lake" - 4:08 (Odde/Odde, PP)

== Personnel ==
Sort Sol

- Lars Top-Galia – guitar
- Knud Odde – bass guitar
- Peter Peter – lead guitar
- Steen Jørgensen – vocals
- Tomas Ortved – drums

Additional musicians and production

- Wili Jønsson – backing vocals on "Dog Star Man" and "Sleepwalker", additional bass guitar and mellotron on "Let Your Fingers Do The Walking", backing vocals, additional bass guitar and mellotron on "Written In The Wind", backing vocals, additional bass guitar and piano on "Bangalore Flow"
- Alex Nyborg Madsen – backing vocals on "Dog Star Man", "Popcorn", "Shaheeba Bay" and "Bangalore Flow"
- Ole Theill – tabla on "Bangalore Flow"
- Povl Kristian – strings on "Bangalore Flow" and "Lady Of The Lake"
- Flemming Rasmussen – production, mixing and engineering
- Simon Vinestock – mixing
- Henrik Vindeby – assisting engineering
- Lene Reidel – mastering
