= Minutes to Go =

Studio album by Sods
- Released: 1979
- Studio: Sweet Silence Studios, Copenhagen, Denmark
- Genre: Punk
- Label: Medley Records
- Producer: Poul Bruun, Sods

Sods chronology
Minutes to Go (1979)	Under en sort sol (1980)

Minutes to Go is the debut album released by Danish punk band Sods (later named Sort Sol). It was released in 1979 and is often referred to as Denmark's first punk album. The original album contained eight of the band's own songs and a cover version of Suicide's "Ghost Rider".

The album was re-released in 1997 with six bonus tracks.

== Track listing ==
All songs by Sods (except where noted).

1. "R.A.F."
2. "Television Sect"
3. "Pathetic"
4. "Police" (Sods-Camilla Højby, Sods)
5. "Flickering Eyes"
6. "Suicide"
7. "Transport"
8. "Copenhagen"
9. "Ghost Rider" (Martin Rev, Alan Vega)

1997 re-release bonus tracks

10. "Rock'N' Roll"
11. "Tin Can People"
12. "Military Madness" (Sods-Camilla Højby, Sods)
13. "No Ref"
14. "Number One"
15. "Breathtaking Effects"

== Personnel ==
Sods

- Peter Peter – guitar
- Tomas Ortved – drums
- Knud Odde – bass guitar
- Steen Jørgensen – vocals

Production

- Poul Bruun – production
- Flemming Rasmussen – engineering
- Rapand – engineering
