= Snakecharmer (album) =

Studio album by Sort Sol
- Released: April 3, 2001
- Recorded: 2001
- Genre: Rock, alternative rock
- Length: 36:43
- Label: Mercury
- Producer: Per Sunding, Sort Sol

Sort Sol chronology
| Unspoiled Monsters (1996) | Snakecharmer (2001) | Stor Langsom Stjerne (2017) |

Singles from Snakecharmer
- 1. "Nights in White Satin" Released: November 2000; 2. "Elia Rising" Released: 2001; 3. "I'll Take Care of You" Released: 2001

Snakecharmer is the eighth studio album by the Danish rock band Sort Sol and the sixth under that name after renaming from the earlier Sods.

The album was released on April 3, 2001, by Mercury Records. It was their first album in five years since Unspoiled Monsters (1996). The album reached number one in Denmark, and was certified gold by the International Federation of the Phonographic Industry (IFPI) for shipments of 25,000 copies.

== Track listing ==
1. "I'll Take Care of You" – 4:46 (Jørgensen/Top-Galia)
2. "It's Gonna Rain" – 4:10 (Jørgensen/Top-Galia)
3. "Brogue" – 4:34 (Jørgensen/Top-Galia)
4. "Rhinestone" – 3:58 (Odde)
5. "Next Century" – 3:38 (Jørgensen/Top-Galia)
6. "Elia Rising" (featuring Sissel) – 4:25 (Odde)
7. "Who's Afraid of Virginia Woolf" – 2:39 (Odde/Odde, Top-Galia, Ortved)
8. "Daddy Howard in Queens" – 3:36 (Odde/Odde-Ortved)
9. "Nights in White Satin" – 4:57 (Hayward)

== Personnel ==
Sort Sol

- Steen Jørgensen – vocals
- Tomas Ortved – drums
- Lars Top-Galia – lead guitar
- Knud Odde – bass guitar

Additional musicians and production

- Henrik Lindstrand – arranging and conducting on "I'll Take Care Of You"
- Wili Jønsson – additional bass guitar and keyboard on "I'll Take Care Of You", "Elia Rising" and "Night In White Satin"
- Sissel – duet on "Elia Rising"
- Per Sunding – backing vocals on "I'll Take Care Of You", "Rhinestone" and "Daddy Howard In Queens"
- Mark Linn – backing vocals on "Brogue", "Next Century" and "Who's Afraid Of Virginia Wolf"
- Alex Nyborg Madsen – backing vocals on "Who's Afraid Of Virginia Wolf"
- Mathias Toksværd – turntables on "It's Gonna Rain", "Brogue" and "Next Century"
- Laust Sonne – additional drums and percussion on "I'll Take Care Of You"
- S. Andersson – saxophone on "Who's Afraid Of Virginia Wolf"
- Jeppe Kaas – strings and horn on "Elia Rising"
- Johnny Stage – guitars, bass, backing vocals and keyboard on "Rhinestone" (original producer) and "Daddy Howard In Queens" (original producer)
- Per Sunding – production
- Michael Ilbert – mixing
- George Marino – mastering

== Charts and certifications ==
=== Charts ===
| Chart (2001) | Peak position |
|---|---|
| Danish Albums Chart | 1 |

=== Certifications ===
| Region | Certification | Certified units/sales |
|---|---|---|
| Denmark (IFPI Danmark) | Gold | 25,000^{^} |
^{^} Shipments figures based on certification alone.
