= Flow My Firetear =

Studio album by Sort Sol
- Released: 1991
- Recorded: 1990/1991
- Genres: Rock, alternative rock
- Length: 30:46
- Label: Columbia
- Producers: Kim Hyttel and Sort Sol

Sort Sol chronology
Everything That Rises Must Converge (1987)	Flow My Firetear (1991)	Glamourpuss (1993)

Flow My Firetear is the fifth album by the Danish rock act Sort Sol known earlier as Sods, and the third after the renaming. It was released in March 1991. The album was the band's first commercial success and included the hits "Siggimund Blue" and "Midnight Train To Summer".

== Track listing ==
1. "Siggimund Blue" - 4:20 (Odde/Odde, P.P.)
2. "Daughter of Sad" - 3:17 (Jørgensen/Top-Galia)
3. "Girl of 1000 Tears" - 2:52 (Odde)
4. "Carry Me into the Sun" - 3:14 (Odde)
5. "Midnight Train to Summer" - 4:04 (Odde/Jørgensen, Odde, Ortved, P.P., Top-Galia)
6. "Desdemona" - 3:30 (Jørgensen/P.P.)
7. "Two Tongue Tale" - 3:18 (Jørgensen/Odde, Ortved, P.P., Top-Galia)
8. "Dyanna Thorne" - 2:37 (Odde)
9. "Tatlin Tower" - 3:40 (Odde/Odde, P.P.)

== Personnel ==
Sort Sol

- Steen Jørgensen – vocals
- Knud Odde – bass guitar
- Peter Peter – lead guitar
- Lars Top-Galia – rhythm guitar
- Tomas Ortved – drums

Additional musicians and production

- Wili Jønsson – piano and backing vocals on "Daughter Of Sad"
- Lise Cabble – vocals on "Carry Me Into The Sun", "Midnight Train To Summer" and "Two tongue Tale"
- Link Wray Add. – rhythm guitar on "Tatlin Tower"
- Flemming Rasmussen – engineering
- Peter Iversen – engineering
- Lene Reidel – mastering
