= Storyville Records =

International record company and label

- Parent company: Wise Music Group
- Founded: 1952
- Founder: Karl Emil Knudsen
- Genre: Jazz, blues
- Country of origin: Denmark
- Location: Copenhagen
- Official website: www.storyvillerecords.com

Storyville Records is an international record company and label based in Copenhagen, Denmark, specializing in jazz and blues music. Besides its original material, Storyville Records has reissued many vintage jazz recordings that previously appeared on labels such as Paramount Records, American Music Records, and Southland Records. Many Storyville records were pressed in Japan.

== History ==
Storyville Records was founded in the 1950s by Karl Emil Knudsen, a Danish jazz record collector who was working for the Copenhagen telephone company. Named after Storyville, New Orleans, the red-light district, its focus has always been on jazz and blues.

The label's first releases were 78 rpm reissues featuring Ma Rainey, Clarence Williams Blue Five, and James P. Johnson. Storyville soon began releasing original recordings, beginning with Ken Colyer's Jazz Men, a British group including Chris Barber, Monty Sunshine, and Lonnie Donegan.

Knudsen was also co-founder of the Storyville Club, a Copenhagen venue that booked the Colyer band in 1953. The band was recorded by Chris Albertson during its stay in Denmark. These performances were the label's first release of original material and remain in the Storyville catalog. Currently the catalog contains an eclectic mix of jazz genres. It has also expanded to include video releases and, under the umbrella company, JazzMedia, books and discographies.

When Karl Emil Knudsen died on September 5, 2003, the company continued to function under Anders Stefansen, who led it until 2005 when it was acquired by Edition Wilhelm Hansen, Denmark's oldest music publishing company, a division of the Music Sales Group (now Wise Music Group).

== Artists ==
=== Jazz ===
- Louis Armstrong
- Sharkey Bonano
- Papa Bue
- Miles Davis
- Kenny Drew
- Duke Ellington
- Stan Getz
- Dexter Gordon
- Coleman Hawkins
- Woody Herman
- Earl Hines
- Billie Holiday
- Clint Houston
- Gene Krupa
- George Lewis
- Vincent Nilsson
- Thelonious Monk
- Charlie Parker
- Stuff Smith
- Ralph Sutton
- Art Tatum
- Jack Teagarden
- Charles Tyler
- Lee Wiley
- Lester Young
- Ronnie Cuber

=== Blues ===
- Big Bill Broonzy
- Eddy Clearwater
- Jimmy Dawkins
- Champion Jack Dupree
- Snooks Eaglin
- Robert "Big Mojo" Elem
- Lonnie Johnson
- Magic Slim
- Memphis Slim
- Otis Spann
- Big Joe Williams
- Sonny Boy Williamson
