= 1920s in jazz =

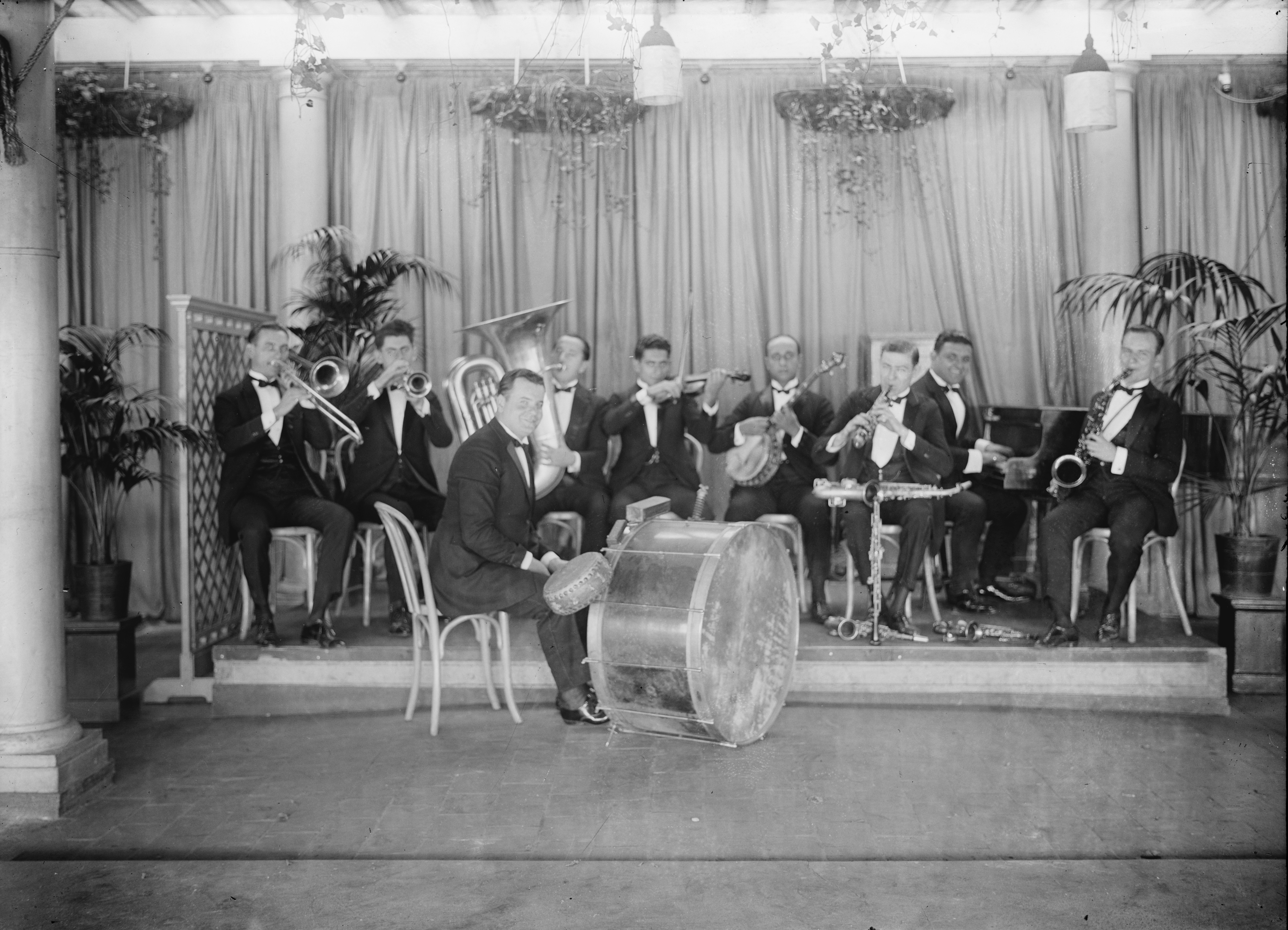
Ray Miller Orchestra

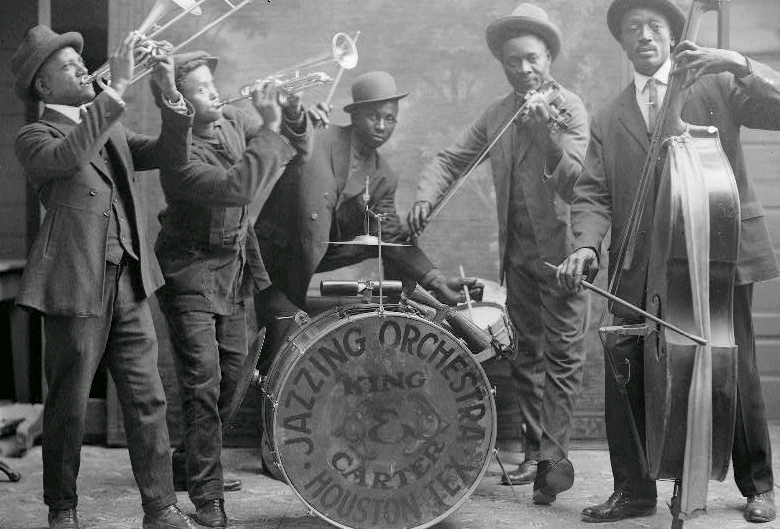
King & Carter Jazzing Orchestra, Houston, Texas, 1921

The period from the end of the First World War until the start of the Depression in 1929 is known as the "Jazz Age". Jazz had become popular music in America, although older generations considered the music immoral and threatening to cultural values. Dances such as the Charleston and the Black Bottom were very popular during the period, and jazz bands typically consisted of seven to twelve musicians. Important orchestras in New York were led by Fletcher Henderson, Paul Whiteman and Duke Ellington. Many New Orleans jazzmen had moved to Chicago during the late 1910s in search of employment; among others, the New Orleans Rhythm Kings, King Oliver's Creole Jazz Band and Jelly Roll Morton recorded in the city. However, Chicago's importance as a center of jazz music started to diminish toward the end of the 1920s in favor of New York.

In the early years of jazz, record companies were often eager to decide what songs were to be recorded by their artists. Popular numbers in the 1920s were pop hits such as "Sweet Georgia Brown", "Dinah" and "Bye Bye Blackbird". The first jazz artist to be given some liberty in choosing his material was Louis Armstrong, whose band helped popularize many of the early standards in the 1920s and 1930s.

Some compositions written by jazz artists have endured as standards, including Fats Waller's "Honeysuckle Rose" and "Ain't Misbehavin'". The most recorded 1920s standard is Hoagy Carmichael and Mitchell Parish's "Stardust". Several songs written by Broadway composers in the 1920s have become standards, such as George and Ira Gershwin's "The Man I Love" (1924), Irving Berlin's "Blue Skies" (1927) and Cole Porter's "What Is This Thing Called Love?" (1929). However, it was not until the 1930s that musicians became comfortable with the harmonic and melodic sophistication of Broadway tunes and started including them regularly in their repertoire.

== 1920 ==
In 1920, the Jazz Age was underway and was indirectly fueled by prohibition of alcohol. In Chicago, the jazz scene was developing rapidly, aided by the immigration of over 40 prominent New Orleans jazzmen to the city, continuous throughout much of the 1920s, including The New Orleans Rhythm Kings who began playing at Friar's Inn. However, in 1920, the cabaret business began in New York City and the growing number of speakeasies developing in the cellars of New York City provided many aspiring jazz musicians with new venues which gradually saw many musicians who had moved to Chicago ending up in the east coast. Classic Blues became very prominent from 1920 after Mamie Smith recorded Crazy Blues and grew in popularity along with jazz.

In 1920, Paul Whiteman and his band recorded "Whispering" in New York City, in a subgenre known as symphonic jazz. Meanwhile, in New York City Adrian Rollini began playing bass saxophone with the California Ramblers and would later in the decade play with Bix Beiderbecke. Duke Ellington had developed into a successful band leader and Louis Armstrong began to amaze audiences with New Orleans Jazz.

== 1921 ==
=== Standards ===
- 1921 – "The Sheik of Araby" is a song composed by Andrew Lamont with lyrics by Harry B. Smith and Francis Wheeler. It was written in response to the popularity of the Rudolph Valentino film The Sheik. The Club Royal Orchestra introduced the song on their first recording in 1921. The two recordings of trombonist Jack Teagarden have been cited as a big influence for the song's standard status.

== 1922 ==
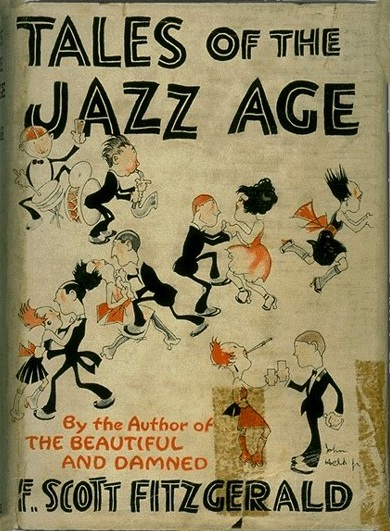
Cover of a 1922 edition of F. Scott Fitzgerald's book Tales of the Jazz Age

In 1922, Chicago and New York City were becoming the most important centres for jazz, and jazz was becoming very profitable for jazz managers such as Paul Whiteman who by 1922 managed some 28 different jazz ensembles on the East Coast, earning more than $1 million in 1922. Yet as a form of music it was still not appreciated by many critics, including Anne Faulkner, who passed off jazz as "a destructive dissonance," asking if the music "put the sin in syncopation"and Henry van Dyke who described jazz as "an unmitigated cacophony, a species of music invented by demons for the torture of imbeciles."

Chicago in 1922 in particular was attracting bands such as Joe "King" Oliver's Creole Jazz Band at the Lincoln Gardens, joined by Louis Armstrong on 8 August 1922 and the Austin High Gang featuring Frank Teschemacher (clarinet), Jimmy McPartland (cornet), Richard McPartland (guitar and banjo) and Lawrence "Bud" Freeman (sax) who began playing at the Friar's Inn in Chicago. Meanwhile, on the New York scene, Duke Ellington arrived in New York City with Sonny Greer and banjo player Elmer Snowden and met his idol James P. Johnson, Fats Waller who had begun to make a name for himself with his piano rolls and Willie "The Lion" Smith.Coleman Hawkins, already well noted for his high level of profiency joined Mamie Smith's Jazz Hounds and were later hired in New York by Fletcher Henderson.

Jazz began to emerge in the Soviet Union with the "First Eccentric Orchestra of the Russian Federated Socialist Republic – Valentin Parnakh's Jazz Band ".

== 1923 ==
=== Standard ===
- 1923 – "Charleston" is a jazz orchestration for the Charleston dance, composed by James P. Johnson with lyrics by Cecil Mack. Introduced by Elisabeth Welch in the 1923 Broadway musical Runnin' Wild, its success brought the Charleston dance to international popularity. Johnson's original rhythmic accompaniment inspired several later songs, many of which used the word "Charleston" in the title. The song was played in the 1946 film It's a Wonderful Life, with James Stewart and Donna Reed, at a dance scene. It was also a featured production number in the 1950 film Tea for Two.
- 1923 – "Tin Roof Blues" is a jazz composition by George Brunies, Paul Mares, Ben Pollack, Leon Roppolo and Mel Stitzel of the New Orleans Rhythm Kings. The band first recorded the tune in 1923, and it became a major influence for later white jazz groups. It is one of the early New Orleans jazz pieces most often played. Credited to Rhythm Kings band members on the original record, the tune may have been based on Joe "King" Oliver's rendition of "Jazzin' Babies Blues" by New Orleans pianist Richard M. Jones. Jo Stafford's 1953 hit "Make Love to Me" used the tune's music with ad

== 1924 ==
In 1924, the improvised solo had become an integral part of most jazz performances Jazz was becoming increasingly popular in New Orleans, Kansas City, Chicago and New York City and 1924 was something of a benchmark of jazz being seen as a serious musical form. John Alden Carpenter made a statement insisting that jazz was now 'our contemporary popular music', and Irving Berlin made a statement that jazz was the "rhythmic beat of our everyday lives," and the music's "swiftness is interpretive of our verve and speed". Leopold Stokowski, the conductor of the Philadelphia Orchestra in 1924, publicly embraced jazz as a musical art form and delivered praise to various jazz musicians. In 1924, George Gershwin wrote Rhapsody in Blue, widely regarded as one of the finest compositions of the 20th century.

Black jazz entrepreneur and producer Clarence Williams successfully recorded groups in the New Orleans area, among them Sidney Bechet and Louis Armstrong. Williams, like Armstrong soon moved from New Orleans and opened a record store in Chicago. In Chicago, Earl Hines formed a group and incidentally inhabited the neighboring apartment to Armstrong while he was in Chicago. Also in Chicago, trumpeter Tommy Ladnier begins playing in Joe Oliver's band. Meanwhile, Bechet soon moved to New England with Ellington during the summer of 1924, playing dances and later New York City.

In 1924, in jazz, ensembles in the Kansas City area began play a style with a four even beat ground beat as opposed to a New Orleans two beat ground beat behind a 4/4 melody. Charlie Parker grew up in Kansas City listening to this style of jazz.

In 1924, Django Reinhardt became a guitarist and began playing the clubs of Paris. Noted Classic Blues singer Bessie Smith began to achieve major fame.

In October 1924, Louis Armstrong joined Fletcher Henderson's band in New York City upon his wife's insistence. They began performing at the Roseland Ballroom on 51st street and Broadway in Manhattan. His new style of jazz playing greatly influenced the style of other New York musicians such as Coleman Hawkins and Duke Ellington. Ellington and his Washingtonians performed at the Hollywood Club on 49th street and Broadway, while Bix Beiderbecke and the Wolverines, renamed Personality Kids performed at the Cinderella Ballroom on 41st street and Broadway. On 5 December 1924, a 17-year-old Jimmy McPartland replaced Beiderbecke in the Wolverines (Personality Kids) band and violinist Dave Harmon joins.

== 1925 ==
=== Standards ===
- 1925 – "Dinah" is a song composed by Harry Akst with lyrics by Sam M. Lewis and Joe Young. It was introduced by Eddie Cantor in the musical Kid Boots and popularized by Ethel Waters's 1925 version, played significantly slower than the original. Bing Crosby's rendition with the Mills Brothers was a number one hit in 1932, and it was sung by Crosby in the film The Big Broadcast. Dinah Shore used it as her theme song, and took her stage name from the song title.
- 1925 – "Squeeze Me" is a jazz song composed by Fats Waller. The lyrics were credited to Clarence Williams, although Andy Razaf claims to have actually written the lyrics. The song was based on an old blues tune called "The Boy in the Boat". It was introduced by Buster Bailey. Albert Brunies's Halfway House Orchestra recorded an important instrumental version in 1925, and later the same year Williams made a popular recording with Louis Armstrong, Coleman Hawkins and vocalist Eva Taylor. Bessie Smith recorded an influential blues version in 1926.
- 1925 – "Sweet Georgia Brown" is a jazz song composed by Maceo Pinkard with music by Kenneth Casey. Bandleader Ben Bernie popularized the song and was given co-credit for the lyrics, although it is unclear whether or not he participated in the writing. Bernie's recording with his Hotel Roosevelt Orchestra stayed at number one of the pop charts for five weeks. The Harlem Globetrotters basketball team has been using Brother Bones and His Shadows' version as their anthem since 1952. Several later jazz tunes have been based on the song's chord progression, such as Jackie McLean's "Donna", Miles Davis's "Dig" and Thelonious Monk's "Bright Mississippi".
- 1925 – "Tea for Two" is a show tune from the Broadway musical No, No, Nanette, composed by Vincent Youmans with lyrics by Irving Caesar. The first hit recordings were by The Benson Orchestra of Chicago and Marion Harris in 1925. Art Tatum famously played the song in a 1931 cutting contest with Fats Waller and James P. Johnson. Tatum's use of substitute chords on the tune had a lasting effect on jazz harmony, and his 1939 piano solo recording was inducted into the Grammy Hall of Fame in 1986. The song became one of the most popular songs of the 1920s, and continues to be performed often. Caesar has said that the lyrics took him only five minutes to write.

== 1926 ==
=== Standards ===
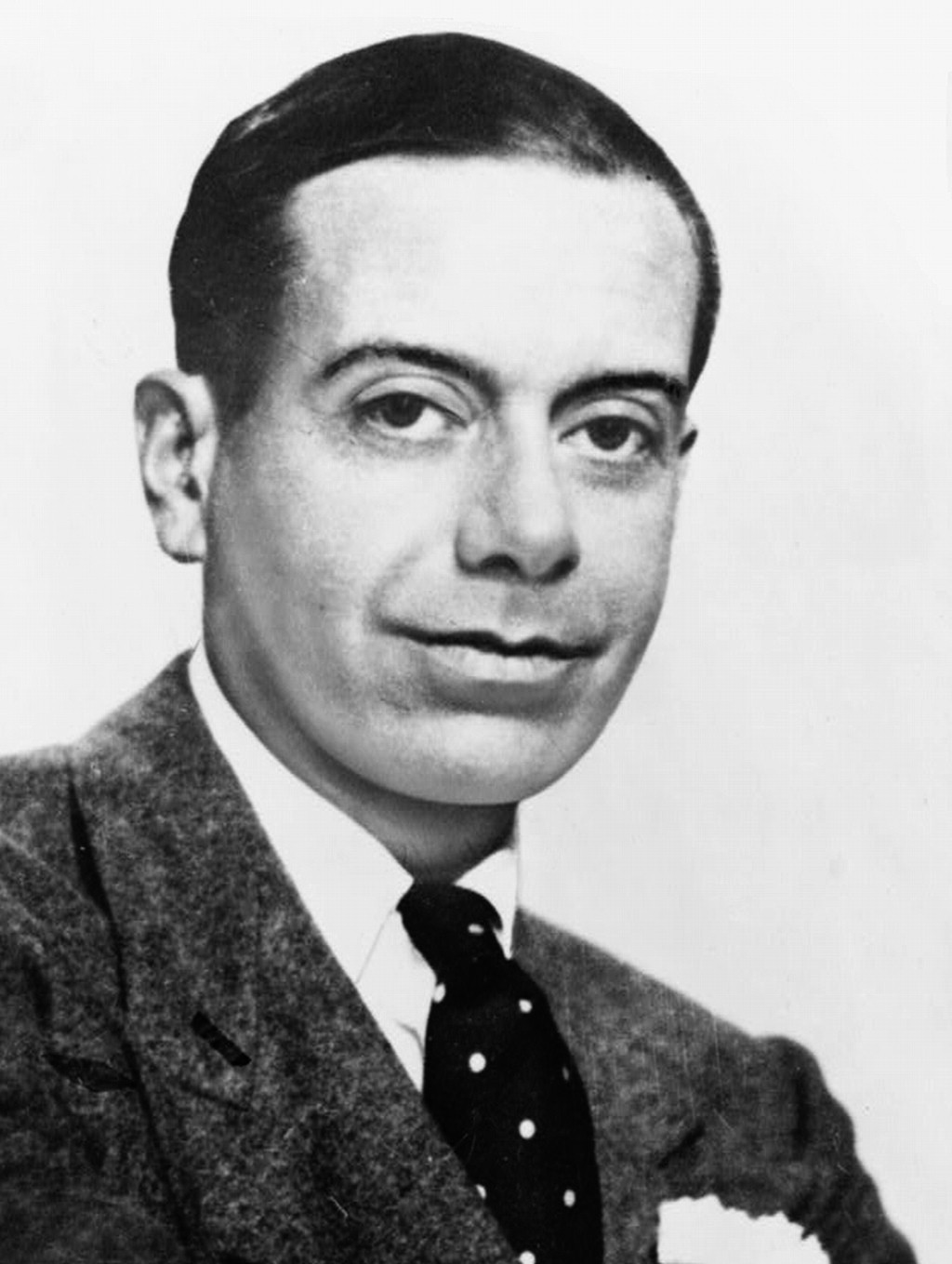
Cole Porter was one of the few Tin Pan Alley songwriters to write both lyrics and music for his songs. His standards include "What Is This Thing Called Love?" (1929), "Love for Sale" (1930) and "Night and Day" (1932).

- 1926 – "Big Butter and Egg Man" is a jazz song written by Percy Venable for Louis Armstrong and May Alix. It was first recorded by Armstrong's Hot Five; the original 1926 recording contains one of Armstrong's most highly regarded cornet solos.
- 1926 – "Bye Bye Blackbird" is a song composed by Ray Henderson with lyrics by Mort Dixon. It was first recorded by Gene Austin, whose rendition became a number one hit. Nick Lucas recorded a popular version the same year. Among jazz performers, the tune only gained popularity after its inclusion on the soundtrack of the 1955 film Pete Kelly's Blues and on Miles Davis's 1957 album 'Round About Midnight.
- 1926 – "'Deed I Do" is a song composed by Fred Rose with lyrics by Walter Hirsch. It was introduced by vaudeville performer S. L. Stambaugh and popularized by Ben Bernie's recording. It was influential clarinetist and bandleader Benny Goodman's debut recording, made with Ben Pollack and His Californians in 1926. Ruth Etting's rendition of the song became a top ten hit in 1927.
- 1926 – "If I Could Be with You (One Hour Tonight)" is a song composed by James P. Johnson with lyrics by Henry Creamer. It was introduced by Clarence Williams' Blue Five with vocalist Eva Taylor. McKinney's Cotton Pickers popularized the song with their 1930 recording and used it as their theme song. Louis Armstrong also recorded a popular version in 1930.
- 1926 – "I've Found a New Baby" is a song by Jack Palmer and Spencer Williams. Also known as "I Found a New Baby", it was introduced by Clarence Williams' Blue Five. The Benny Goodman Orchestra's 1940 version includes an influential guitar solo by Charlie Christian. Charlie Parker recorded the tune several times, first in 1940 as part of the Jay McShann Orchestra. Parker's interpretation was influenced by Lester Young, and the saxophonist even included quotations from Young in his later recordings. The tune is particularly popular among Dixieland bands.
- 1926 – "Muskrat Ramble" is a jazz composition by Kid Ory. Lyrics were added in 1950 by Ray Gilbert. First recorded by Louis Armstrong and his Hot Five in 1926, it became the group's most frequently recorded piece. Composer credit was given to Ory, although bandleader Armstrong has claimed to have written the song himself. Others, like New Orleans clarinetist Sidney Bechet, have argued that it was originally a Buddy Bolden tune titled "The Old Cow Died and the Old Man Cried". The tune was a prominent part of the Dixieland revival repertoire in the 1930s and 1940s.
- 1926 – "Someone to Watch Over Me" is a show tune from the Broadway musical Oh, Kay!, composed by George Gershwin with lyrics by Ira Gershwin. Gertrude Lawrence introduced the song on stage, singing it to a rag doll. Lawrence also made the first hit recording of the song in 1927. Lyricist Howard Dietz claims to have come up with the song's name and helped with the lyrics, but received no official credit. The song's jazz popularity was established in the mid-1940s by the recordings of Billy Butterfield, Eddie Condon, Coleman Hawkins and Ike Quebec.
- 1926 – "Sugar" is a song by Maceo Pinkard, Edna Alexander and Sidney D. Mitchell. It was first recorded by Ethel Waters in 1926 and popularized as a standard by Eddie Condon's 1927 recording that featured first-timers Gene Krupa, Joe Sullivan and Frank Teschmaker. The song is also known as "That Sugar Baby o' Mine", and is not to be confused by another song named "Sugar" from 1927, written by Jack Yellen, Milton Ager, Frank Crum and Red Nichols.

== 1927 ==
=== Standards ===
- 1927 – "Blue Skies" is a show tune by Irving Berlin from the musical Betsy. Richard Rodgers and Lorenz Hart had originally written a solo number for Belle Baker, titled "This Funny World", but the star was unsatisfied with the song and asked Berlin to write a show-stopper for the musical. Berlin responded with "Blue Skies", and on the opening night the audience demanded 24 encores of Baker's song. A 1927 rendition by Ben Selvin and His Orchestra, recorded under the name "The Knickerbockers", became a number one hit. Al Jolson performed the song in 1927 in the first ever feature-length sound film, The Jazz Singer. Jazz renditions include Benny Goodman's 1938 concert in Carnegie Hall and Tommy Dorsey's 1941 recording with young Frank Sinatra on vocals.
- 1927 – "'S Wonderful" is a show tune from the Broadway musical Funny Face, composed by George Gershwin with lyrics by Ira Gershwin. It was introduced on stage by Adele Astaire and Allen Kearns. The vocalist most associated with the song is Fred Astaire, who recorded it in 1952 accompanied by Oscar Peterson's band. Astaire also sang the song with Audrey Hepburn in the 1957 musical film Funny Face. Stan Getz's 1950 recording with Horace Silver revived the tune as a jazz standard.

== 1928 ==
=== Standards ===
- "Basin Street Blues" is a blues song written by Spencer Williams and introduced by Louis Armstrong. Trombonist and singer Jack Teagarden recorded the song several times, first in 1929 with the Louisiana Rhythm Kings. Teagarden's 1931 recording with The Charleston Chasers, led by Benny Goodman, popularized the song. An additional verse was later added by Teagarden and Glenn Miller, who also claimed to have written the lyrics for the chorus.
- "Crazy Rhythm" is a show tune composed by Roger Wolfe Kahn and Joseph Meyer with lyrics by Irving Caesar. It was introduced in the Broadway musical Here's Howe by Ben Bernie, who also made a successful vocal recording. Roger Wolfe Kahn and His Orchestra recorded it the same year with vocalist Franklyn Baur. The song has inspired the names of several albums, jazz groups, organizations and nightclubs.
- "Creole Love Call" is a jazz composition by Duke Ellington, James "Bubber" Miley and Rudy Jackson. It was based on the melody of "Camp Meeting Blues" by Joe "King" Oliver. Ellington's recording is known for the wordless vocal performance by Adelaide Hall. The tune is also known as "Creole Love Song".
- "If I Had You" is a popular ballad by Irving King (a pseudonym for James Campbell and Reginald Connelly) and Ted Shapiro. It was popularized in Britain by Al Bowlly with Fred Elizalde and His Orchestra, and shortly thereafter by Rudy Vallée in the United States. It was marketed as "the favorite fox-trot of the Prince of Wales". The first jazz recording was made in 1941 by Benny Goodman's sextet. Art Blakey recorded a memorable ballad version with saxophonist Lou Donaldson in 1954.
- "Lover, Come Back to Me" is a show tune from the Broadway show The New Moon, composed by Sigmund Romberg with lyrics by Oscar Hammerstein II. Paul Whiteman, the Arden-Ohman Orchestra and Rudy Vallée all recorded hit versions in 1929 while the musical was running. Billie Holiday performed the song on several records, first in 1944. Nat King Cole revived the song in 1953. A part of the composition was based on Pyotr Tchaikovsky's Barcarolle.
- "Mack The Knife" is a song from The Threepenny Opera, composed by Kurt Weill with lyrics by Bertolt Brecht. Originally called "Die Moritat von Mackie Messer" in German, the song was translated into English by Marc Blitzstein in 1954. The first jazz recording was made by Sidney Bechet in 1954 under the title "La Complainte de Mackie". Louis Armstrong's 1955 version established the song's popularity in the jazz world. It is also known as "The Ballad of Mack the Knife".
- "Nagasaki" is a jazz song composed by Harry Warren with lyrics by Mort Dixon. It was first recorded by Friar's Society Orchestra. The Ipana Troubadors made a hit recording in 1928. The most famous jazz versions were recorded by Benny Goodman in 1936 and 1947. Fletcher Henderson played it in 1934 in the Harlem Opera House as the "national anthem of Harlem".
- "Softly, As in a Morning Sunrise" is a song from the Broadway show The New Moon, composed by Sigmund Romberg with lyrics by Oscar Hammerstein II. The first jazz recording was made by Artie Shaw in 1938. The tune was a regular number in the Modern Jazz Quartet's repertoire; it was already considered a standard when the group recorded their first rendition in 1952.
- "Sweet Lorraine" is a song composed by Cliff Burwell with lyrics by Mitchell Parish. Teddy Wilson's version was the first to make the pop charts in 1935. The song is closely associated with Nat King Cole, who recorded it in 1940 and several times afterwards. According to a common story, Cole's singing career started in 1938 when a drunk customer insisted on the pianist singing "Sweet Lorraine" during a show.

== 1929 ==
=== Standards ===
- "Ain't Misbehavin'" is a song from the musical revue Hot Chocolates, composed by Fats Waller and Harry Brooks with lyrics by Andy Razaf. Leo Reisman and His Orchestra was the first to take the song to the pop charts in 1929, followed by several artists including Bill Robinson, Gene Austin and Louis Armstrong. At the intermission of Hot Chocolates at the Hudson Theatre, Armstrong made his Broadway debut playing a trumpet solo on the song. Waller's original instrumental recording was inducted into the Grammy Hall of Fame in 1984.
- "Black and Blue" is a song from the musical Hot Chocolates, composed by Fats Waller with lyrics by Harry Brooks and Andy Razaf. It was introduced by Louis Armstrong. Ethel Waters's 1930 version became a hit. The song is also known as "What Did I Do to Be So Black and Blue".
- "Honeysuckle Rose" is a song from the musical revue Load of Coal, composed by Fats Waller with lyrics by Andy Razaf. It was popularized by Fletcher Henderson and His Orchestra in 1933. Waller's 1934 recording of the song was inducted into the Grammy Hall of Fame in 1999. Benny Goodman's Orchestra played a 16-minute jam session on the tune in their 1938 Carnegie Hall concert, featuring members from the bands of Count Basie and Duke Ellington. Charlie Parker used a part of the song's harmony in "Scrapple from the Apple" (1947).
- "Just You, Just Me" is a song from the film Marianne, composed by Jesse Greer with lyrics by Raymond Klages. It was introduced by Marion Davies and Cliff Edwards. Lester Young recorded the tune several times. Thelonious Monk's 1948 composition "Evidence" was loosely based on it.
- "Liza (All the Clouds'll Roll Away)" is a show tune from the Broadway musical Show Girl, composed by George Gershwin with lyrics by Ira Gershwin and Gus Kahn. It was introduced on stage by Ruby Keeler and Dixie Dugan, accompanied by the Duke Ellington Orchestra. Keeler's husband and popular singer Al Jolson appeared at the opening performance and sang a chorus of the song from the third row, creating a sensation and popularizing the song.
- "Mean to Me" is a song composed by Fred E. Ahlert with lyrics by Roy Turk. It was first recorded by Ruth Etting. The song was a regular number in Billie Holiday's repertoire, and Holiday's 1937 recording with saxophonist Lester Young is considered the definitive vocal version. Young later made an instrumental recording with Nat King Cole and Buddy Rich.
- "More Than You Know" is a Broadway show tune composed by Vincent Youmans with lyrics by Edward Eliscu and Billy Rose. Introduced by Mayo Methot in Great Day, the song became a hit even though the musical only lasted for 29 performances. Ruth Etting took it to number nine in 1930, and sexophonist Benny Carter played an acclaimed trumpet solo on his 1939 recording, despite the trumpet not being his main instrument.
- "Rockin' Chair" is a song by Hoagy Carmichael. It was first recorded by Louis Armstrong in a duet with the composer. Carmichael has said that he wrote the song as a kind of sequel to his 1926 "Washboard Blues", which had lyrics by Fred Callahan. The song was made famous by Mildred Bailey, who used it as her theme song. Bailey's first hit recording was made in 1937.
- "Stardust" is a song composed by Hoagy Carmichael with lyrics by Mitchell Parish. Originally recorded by Carmichael as a mid-tempo jazz instrumental, the 1930 romantic ballad rendition by Isham Jones and His Orchestra became a top-selling hit. Louis Armstrong recorded an influential ballad rendition in 1931. The song is arguably the most recorded popular song, and one of the top jazz standards. Billboard magazine conducted a poll of leading disk jockeys in 1955 on the "popular song record of all time"; four different renditions of "Stardust" made it to the list, including Glenn Miller's (1941) at third place and Artie Shaw's (1940) at number one. The title was spelled "Star Dust" in the 1929 publication, and both spellings are used.
- "What Is This Thing Called Love?" is a song written by Cole Porter for the musical revue Wake Up and Dream. It was introduced by Elsie Carlisle in London. Ben Bernie's and Fred Rich's recordings made the charts in 1930. One of the best-known instrumental versions was recorded by Clifford Brown and Max Roach with Sonny Rollins in 1956. The song's chord progression has inspired several later compositions, including Tadd Dameron's bebop standard "Hot House".

== Bibliography ==
- The New Real Book, Volume I. Sher Music. 1988. ISBN 0-9614701-4-3.
- The New Real Book, Volume II. Sher Music. 1991. ISBN 0-9614701-7-8.
- The New Real Book, Volume III. Sher Music. 1995. ISBN 1-883217-30-X.
- The Real Book, Volume I (6th ed.). Hal Leonard. 2004. ISBN 0-634-06038-4.
- The Real Book, Volume II (2nd ed.). Hal Leonard. 2007. ISBN 978-1-4234-2452-9.
- The Real Book, Volume III (2nd ed.). Hal Leonard. 2006. ISBN 0-634-06136-4.
- The Real Jazz Book. Warner Bros. ISBN 978-91-85041-36-7.
- The Real Vocal Book, Volume I. Hal Leonard. 2006. ISBN 0-634-06080-5.
