= List of 1920s jazz standards =

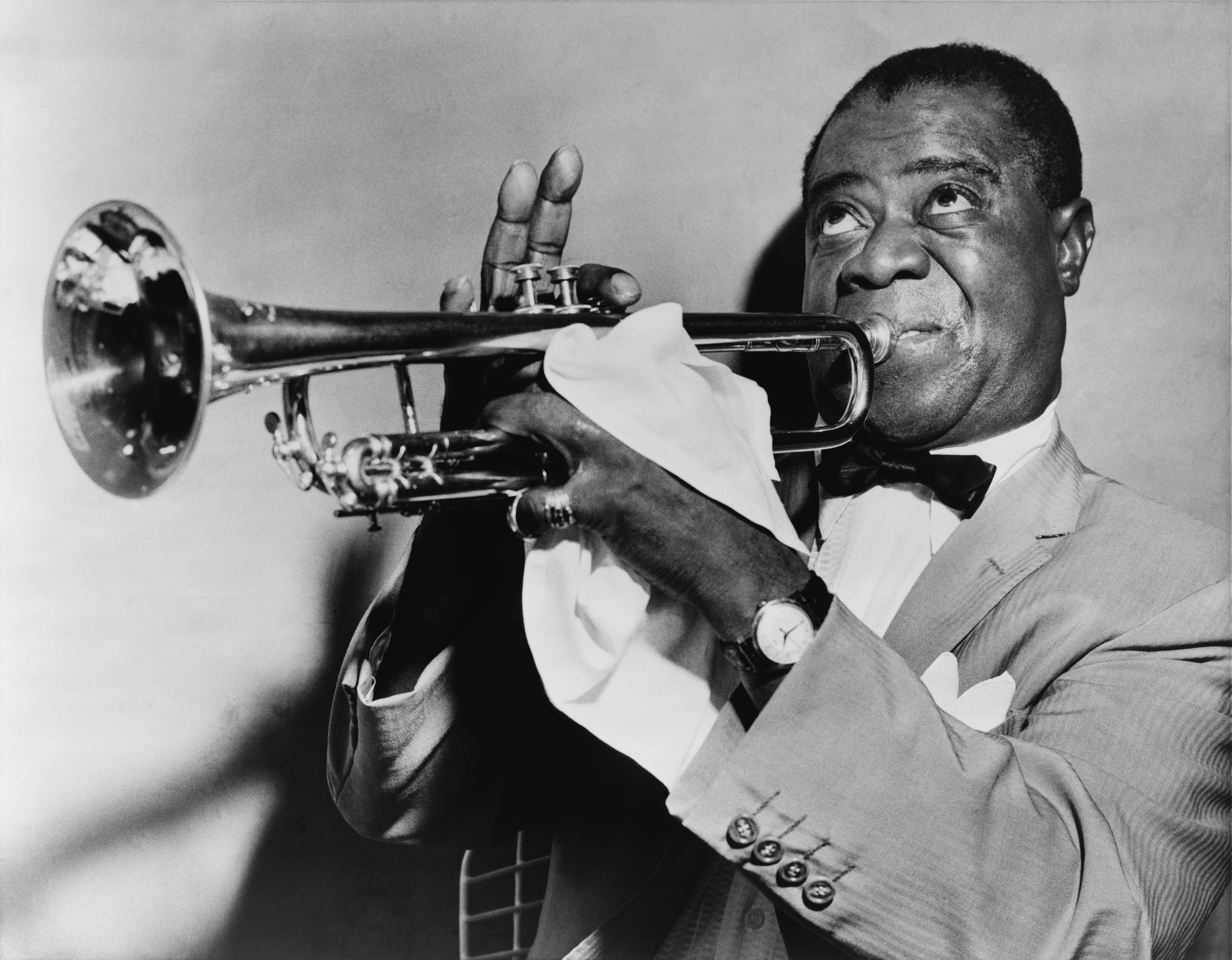
Trumpeter, bandleader and singer Louis Armstrong was an important innovator of early jazz. He introduced many contemporary popular songs to the jazz world that are now considered standards.

Jazz standards are musical compositions that are widely known, performed and recorded by jazz artists as part of the genre's musical repertoire. This list includes compositions written in the 1920s that are considered standards by at least one major book publication or reference work. Some of the tunes listed were already well-known standards by the 1930s, while others were popularized later. The time of the most influential recordings of a song, where appropriate, is indicated on the list.

A period known as the "Jazz Age" started in the United States in the 1920s. Jazz had become popular music in the country, although older generations considered the music immoral and threatening to old cultural values. Dances such as the Charleston and the Black Bottom were very popular during the period, and jazz bands typically consisted of seven to twelve musicians. Important orchestras in New York were led by Fletcher Henderson, Paul Whiteman and Duke Ellington. Many New Orleans jazzmen had moved to Chicago during the late 1910s in search of employment; among others, the New Orleans Rhythm Kings, King Oliver's Creole Jazz Band and Jelly Roll Morton recorded in the city. However, Chicago's importance as a center of jazz music started to diminish toward the end of the 1920s in favor of New York.

In the early years of jazz, record companies were often eager to decide what songs were to be recorded by their artists. Popular numbers in the 1920s were pop hits such as "Sweet Georgia Brown", "Dinah" and "Bye Bye Blackbird". The first jazz artist to be given some liberty in choosing his material was Louis Armstrong, whose band helped popularize many of the early standards in the 1920s and 1930s.

Some compositions written by jazz artists have endured as standards, including Fats Waller's "Honeysuckle Rose" and "Ain't Misbehavin'". The most recorded 1920s standard is Hoagy Carmichael and Mitchell Parish's "Stardust". Several songs written by Broadway composers in the 1920s have become standards, such as George and Ira Gershwin's "The Man I Love" (1924), Irving Berlin's "Blue Skies" (1927) and Cole Porter's "What Is This Thing Called Love?" (1929). However, it was not until the 1930s that musicians became comfortable with the harmonic and melodic sophistication of Broadway tunes and started including them regularly in their repertoire.

== 1920–1923 ==
"Avalon" (1920)
Al Jolson's original recording of "Avalon".

- 1920 – "Avalon" is a song written by Al Jolson, Buddy DeSylva and Vincent Rose. Jolson introduced the song, taking it to number two on the charts in 1921, and used it in the musicals Sinbad and Bombo. The song was possibly written by Rose, but Jolson's popularity as a performer allowed him to claim co-credit. The opening melody was taken from Giacomo Puccini's aria E lucevan le stelle from the opera Tosca, and the composers were successfully sued by Puccini's publishers in 1921 for $25,000 and all subsequent royalties.
- 1920 – "Margie" is a song composed by Con Conrad and J. Russel Robinson with lyrics by Benny Davis. It was introduced by the Original Dixieland Jazz Band and popularized by Eddie Cantor's 1921 recording. The song was one of the first hits for both Conrad and Davis, and was later used in the films Margie (1946) and The Eddie Cantor Story (1954). The name was inspired by Cantor's five-year-old daughter. The song is also known as "My Little Margie".
- 1921 - "The Jazz Me Blues" - is a Dixieland jazz song written by the African-American composer Tom Delaney. It was first recorded by Lucille Hegamin in 1921 and subsequently became a jazz standard. Tony Mottola and John Serry collaborated in the Joe Biviano Accordion & Rhythm Sextette to record an easy listening arrangement of the song in 1946 which is archived in the permanent collection of the Smithsonian Institution's National Museum of American History.
- 1921 – "The Sheik of Araby" is a song composed by Ted Snyder with lyrics by Harry B. Smith and Francis Wheeler. It was written in response to the popularity of the Rudolph Valentino film The Sheik. The Club Royal Orchestra introduced the song on their first recording in 1921. The two recordings of trombonist Jack Teagarden have been cited as a big influence for the song's standard status.
- 1922 – "Bugle Call Rag" is a jazz song by Billy Meyers, Jack Pettis and Elmer Schoebel. It was first recorded by the Friar's Society Orchestra (later the New Orleans Rhythm Kings) and popularized by Benny Goodman and Glenn Miller in the 1930s. Duke Ellington based his 1939 composition "The Sergeant Was Shy" on the song. The original recording of the song was titled "Bugle Call Blues".
- 1922 – "China Boy" is a song by Phil Boutelje and Dick Winfree. It was first recorded by Arnold Johnson and His Orchestra in 1922, and was popularized by Paul Whiteman's 1929 recording featuring a solo by Bix Beiderbecke. The 1927 recording by McKenzie and Condon's Chicagoans defined the early sound of Chicago style jazz. Benny Goodman's 1935 recording revived interest in the song, and it was performed in Goodman's Carnegie Hall concert in 1938. Sidney Bechet and Muggsy Spanier recorded a definitive version March 28, 1940.
- 1922 – "Farewell Blues" is a jazz composition by Paul Mares, Leon Roppolo and Elmer Schoebel of the Friar's Society Orchestra. It was used as the band's theme music, and their performances at the Friar's Inn influenced several younger white jazzmen, such as Bud Freeman and Jimmy McPartland. Isham Jones and His Orchestra had a hit with the tune in 1923.
- 1922 – "I Wish I Could Shimmy Like My Sister Kate" is a jazz composition with words and lyrics by Armand J. Piron. It was published in 1922 with copyright assigned to the publishing house of Clarence Williams. The song was promoted through numerous instrumental recordings for different labels by the Original Memphis Five under their usual name and as The Cotton Pickers. They also accompanied the African-American singer Leona Williams named as Her Dixie Band. Clarence Williams himself recorded the song playing solo piano accompaniment to his wife Eva Taylor. The song was revived in a 1939 recording by Muggsy Spanier and His Ragtime Band with a vocal chorus by George Brunies, which established its status as a standard.
- 1923 – "Charleston" is a jazz orchestration for the Charleston dance, composed by James P. Johnson with lyrics by Cecil Mack. Introduced by Elisabeth Welch in the 1923 Broadway musical Runnin' Wild, its success brought the Charleston dance to international popularity. Johnson's original rhythmic accompaniment inspired several later songs, many of which used the word "Charleston" in the title. The song was played in the 1946 film It's a Wonderful Life, starring James Stewart and Donna Reed, at a dance scene. It was also a featured production number in the 1950 film Tea for Two. It featured in an episode of the 1970s sitcom The Brady Bunch.
- 1923 – "Tin Roof Blues" is a jazz composition by George Brunies, Paul Mares, Ben Pollack, Leon Roppolo and Mel Stitzel of the New Orleans Rhythm Kings. The band first recorded the tune in 1923, and it became a major influence for later jazz groups. It is one of the early New Orleans jazz pieces most often played. Jo Stafford's 1953 hit "Make Love to Me" used the tune's music with added lyrics.

== 1924–1925 ==
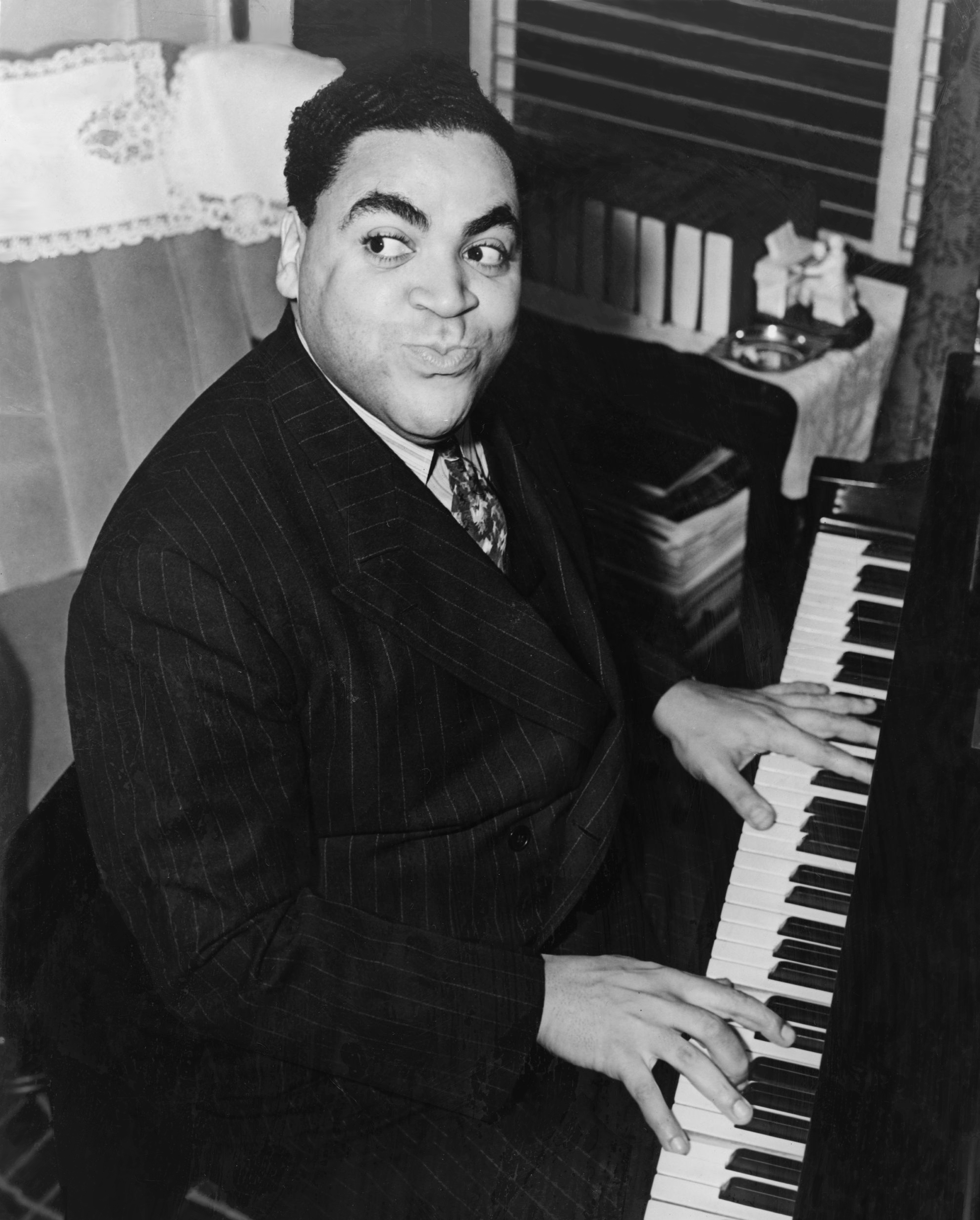
Jazz pianist Fats Waller wrote many of the early jazz standards, including "Squeeze Me" (1925), "Ain't Misbehavin'" (1929) and "Honeysuckle Rose" (1929).

- 1924 – "Everybody Loves My Baby" is a song composed by Spencer Williams with lyrics by Jack Palmer. It was introduced by Clarence Williams and His Blue Five, with Louis Armstrong on trumpet. Armstrong also recorded the song with the Fletcher Henderson Orchestra later in 1924; the take marked Armstrong's first vocal recording. The song is also known as "Everybody Loves My Baby, but My Baby Don't Love Nobody but Me".
- 1924 – "Fascinating Rhythm" is a song composed by George Gershwin, with lyrics by Ira Gershwin. It was first introduced by Cliff Edwards, Fred Astaire and Adele Astaire in the Broadway musical Lady Be Good. Cliff Edwards recorded a version of "Fascinating Rhythm" in 1924 that featured an early example of scat singing. The Astaires recorded the song on April 19, 1926, in London with George Gershwin on the piano (English Columbia 3968 or 8969). The 1926 Astaire/Gershwin version and a 1938 version by Hawaiian steel guitarist Sol Hoʻopiʻi have both been added to the Library of Congress's National Recording Registry of "culturally, historically, or aesthetically important" American sound recordings. Many jazz-oriented artists have recorded "Fascinating Rhythm", including Louis Bellson, Rosemary Clooney, Tommy Dorsey (for the 1943 movie Girl Crazy), Ella Fitzgerald, Benny Goodman, Stephane Grappelli, Vince Guaraldi, Scott Hamilton, Earl Hines, Sam Lanin, Red Norvo, Oscar Peterson, John Pizzarelli, George Shearing, Stuff Smith, Mel Torme, and Paul Whiteman.
- 1924 – "Hard Hearted Hannah (The Vamp of Savannah)" is a song composed by Milton Ager with lyrics by Charles Bates, Bob Bigelow and Jack Yellen. It was introduced by Frances Williams in the Broadway musical Innocent Eyes. Hit recordings were made by Dolly Kay, Margaret Young and Herb Wiedoeft and His Orchestra. Ella Fitzgerald sang it in the 1955 film Pete Kelly's Blues.
- 1924 – "How Come You Do Me Like You Do?" is a song by vaudeville duo Gene Austin and Roy Bergere. It became popular in 1924 with the recordings of blues singers Rosa Henderson and Viola McCoy. Marion Harris recorded a hit version in 1924. The song enjoyed a revival in 1954 after Bill Krenz's recording.
- 1924 – "I'll See You in My Dreams" is a popular song and jazz standard, composed by Isham Jones, with lyrics by Gus Kahn, and published in 1924. It was recorded on December 4 that year, by Isham Jones conducting Ray Miller's Orchestra. Released on Brunswick Records, it charted for 16 weeks during 1925, spending seven weeks at number 1 in the United States. Other jazz-oriented artists who recorded the song include Cliff Edwards, Louis Armstrong, Bing Crosby, Ella Fitzgerald, and Anita O'Day.
- 1924 – "King Porter Stomp" is a ragtime composition by Jelly Roll Morton, originally recorded as a piano solo. Lyrics were later added by Sonny Burke and Sid Robin. Morton claimed to have originally written the tune in 1902. It was named after pianist Porter King, and there is a rumor that Morton consulted ragtime pianist Scott Joplin about the composition. It became a hit when Benny Goodman and his orchestra recorded Fletcher Henderson's arrangement of it in 1935. The chord progression from the first strain has been used in numerous other jazz compositions and is commonly known as the Stomp progression.
- 1924 – "The Man I Love" is a ballad composed by George Gershwin with lyrics by Ira Gershwin. Originally written for the Broadway musical Lady, Be Good (1924), and then meant to be included in Strike Up the Band (1927) and Rosalie (1928), the song was dropped from all three musicals before the show opened. Marion Harris's 1928 recording helped popularize the song, and it has become one of the most recorded jazz standards.
- 1924 – "Oh, Lady Be Good!" is a show tune from the musical Lady, Be Good, composed by George Gershwin with lyrics by Ira Gershwin. Introduced on stage by Walter Catlett, the song became later identified with Ella Fitzgerald after her 1947 recording containing a scat solo. Lester Young's influential and much-imitated tenor saxophone solo on Count Basie's 1936 recording has been cited as a "crowning achievement" and "the best solo [Young] ever recorded".
- 1924 – "Riverboat Shuffle" is a jazz composition by Hoagy Carmichael. Introduced by Bix Beiderbecke and The Wolverines, it was Carmichael's first published composition. Publisher Irving Mills and The Wolverines pianist Dick Voynow were added to the credits on publication. Mitchell Parish wrote lyrics for it in 1939. Carmichael originally wanted to call the tune "Free Wheeling", but band members disliked the name and renamed it. Paul Whiteman recorded the tune in 1927 with Beiderbecke and Carmichael.
- 1924 – "Somebody Loves Me" is a show tune from George White's Scandals of 1924, composed by George Gershwin and Emilia Renaud with lyrics by Ballard MacDonald and Buddy DeSylva. It was introduced by Winnie Lightner on stage, and Paul Whiteman's 1924 recording was a number one hit. After the initial success as a popular song, the song became more often played by jazz artists. Nat King Cole and Peggy Lee recorded popular cross-over versions in the 1940s.
- 1925 – "Dinah" is a song composed by Harry Akst with lyrics by Sam M. Lewis and Joe Young. It was introduced by Eddie Cantor in the musical Kid Boots and popularized by Ethel Waters's 1925 version, played significantly slower than the original. Bing Crosby's rendition with the Mills Brothers was a number one hit in 1932, and it was sung by Crosby in the film The Big Broadcast. Dinah Shore used it as her theme song, and took her stage name from the song title.
- 1925 – "Don't Bring Lulu" is a song composed by Ray Henderson, with lyrics by Lew Brown and Billy Rose. It was recorded by Billy Jones, Billy Murray, and many others.
- 1925 – "I Want to Be Happy" is a show tune from the Broadway musical No, No, Nanette, composed by Vincent Youmans with lyrics by Irving Caesar. Its first jazz hit version was released in 1930 by Red Nichols and peaked at #19. A 1937 recording by Chick Webb And His Orchestra featured Ella Fitzgerald on vocals (and became the second theme song for the ABC Radio National show Counterpoint). Benny Goodman also released a version in 1937 that peaked at #17 and a version by Glenn Miller was the b-side to his 1939 hit "In the Mood".
- 1925 – "Squeeze Me" is a jazz song composed by Fats Waller. The lyrics were credited to Clarence Williams, although Andy Razaf claims to have actually written the lyrics. The song was based on an old blues tune called "The Boy in the Boat". It was introduced by Buster Bailey. Albert Brunies's Halfway House Orchestra recorded an important instrumental version in 1925, and later the same year Williams made a popular recording with Louis Armstrong, Coleman Hawkins and vocalist Eva Taylor. Bessie Smith recorded an influential blues version in 1926.
- 1925 – "Sweet Georgia Brown" is a jazz song composed by Maceo Pinkard with music by Kenneth Casey. Bandleader Ben Bernie popularized the song and was given co-credit for the lyrics, although it is unclear whether or not he participated in the writing. Bernie's recording with his Hotel Roosevelt Orchestra stayed at number one of the pop charts for five weeks. The Harlem Globetrotters basketball team has been using Brother Bones and His Shadows' version as their anthem since 1952. Several later jazz tunes have been based on the song's chord progression, such as Jackie McLean's "Donna", Miles Davis's "Dig" and Thelonious Monk's "Bright Mississippi".
- 1925 – "Tea for Two" is a show tune from the Broadway musical No, No, Nanette, composed by Vincent Youmans with lyrics by Irving Caesar. The first hit recordings were by The Benson Orchestra of Chicago and Marion Harris in 1925. Art Tatum famously played the song in a 1931 cutting contest with Fats Waller and James P. Johnson. Tatum's use of substitute chords on the tune had a lasting effect on jazz harmony, and his 1939 piano solo recording was inducted into the Grammy Hall of Fame in 1986. The song became one of the most popular songs of the 1920s and continues to be performed often. Caesar has said that the lyrics took him only five minutes to write.

== 1926–1927 ==
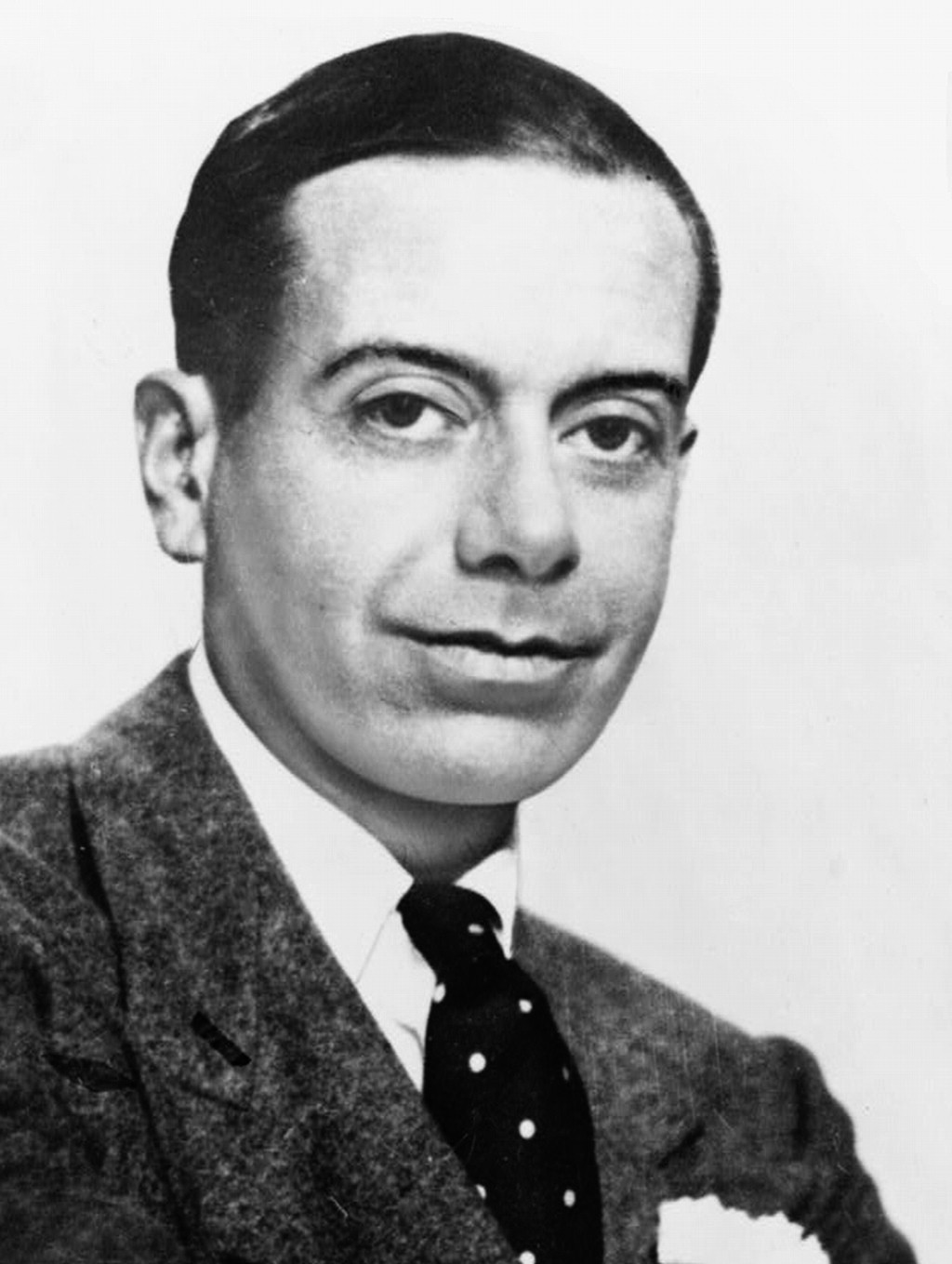
Cole Porter was one of the few Tin Pan Alley songwriters to write both lyrics and music for his songs. His standards include "What Is This Thing Called Love?" (1929), "Love for Sale" (1930) and "Night and Day" (1932).

- 1926 – "Big Butter and Egg Man" is a jazz song written by Percy Venable for Louis Armstrong and May Alix. It was first recorded by Armstrong's Hot Five; the original 1926 recording contains one of Armstrong's most highly regarded cornet solos.
- 1926 – "Bye Bye Blackbird" is a song composed by Ray Henderson with lyrics by Mort Dixon. It was first recorded by Gene Austin, whose rendition became a number one hit. Nick Lucas recorded a popular version the same year. Among jazz performers, the tune only gained popularity after its inclusion on the soundtrack of the 1955 film Pete Kelly's Blues and on Miles Davis's 1957 album 'Round About Midnight.
- 1926 – "'Deed I Do" is a song composed by Fred Rose with lyrics by Walter Hirsch. It was introduced by vaudeville performer S. L. Stambaugh and popularized by Ben Bernie's recording. It was influential clarinetist and bandleader Benny Goodman's debut recording, made with Ben Pollack and His Californians in 1926. Ruth Etting's rendition of the song became a top ten hit in 1927.
- 1926 – "I Can't Believe That You're in Love with Me" is a 1926 popular song and jazz standard composed by Jimmy McHugh, with lyrics by Clarence Gaskill. More than 20 recordings were made of "I Can't Believe That You're in Love with Me" in the 16 years following its publication. Early recordings included Roger Wolfe Kahn and His Orchestra (1926), Louis Armstrong (1930), Nat Gonella (1932), Earl Hines (1932), Artie Shaw (1938), Teddy Wilson and Billie Holiday (1938), Ella Fitzgerald (1941), and Anita O'Day (1945).
- 1926 – "If I Could Be with You (One Hour Tonight)" is a song composed by James P. Johnson with lyrics by Henry Creamer. It was introduced by Clarence Williams' Blue Five with vocalist Eva Taylor. McKinney's Cotton Pickers popularized the song with their 1930 recording and used it as their theme song. Louis Armstrong also recorded a popular version in 1930.
- 1926 – "I've Found a New Baby" is a song by Jack Palmer and Spencer Williams. Also known as "I Found a New Baby", it was introduced by Clarence Williams' Blue Five. The Benny Goodman Orchestra's 1940 version includes an influential guitar solo by Charlie Christian. Charlie Parker recorded the tune several times, first in 1940 as part of the Jay McShann Orchestra. Parker's interpretation was influenced by Lester Young, and the saxophonist even included quotations from Young in his later recordings. The tune is particularly popular among Dixieland bands.
- 1926 – "Muskrat Ramble" is a jazz composition by Kid Ory. From 1926 to 1939 published sheet music and some recordings spelled it "Muskat" Ramble. Lyrics were added in 1950 by Ray Gilbert. First recorded by Louis Armstrong and his Hot Five in 1926, it became the group's most frequently recorded piece. Composer credit was given to Ory, although bandleader Armstrong has claimed to have written the song himself. Others, like New Orleans clarinetist Sidney Bechet, have argued that it was originally a Buddy Bolden tune titled "The Old Cow Died and the Old Man Cried". The tune was a prominent part of the Dixieland revival repertoire in the 1930s and 1940s.
- 1926 – "Someone to Watch Over Me" is a show tune from the Broadway musical Oh, Kay!, composed by George Gershwin with lyrics by Ira Gershwin. Gertrude Lawrence introduced the song on stage, singing it to a rag doll. Lawrence also made the first hit recording of the song in 1927. Lyricist Howard Dietz claims to have come up with the song's name and helped with the lyrics, but received no official credit. The song's jazz popularity was established in the mid-1940s by the recordings of Billy Butterfield, Eddie Condon, Coleman Hawkins and Ike Quebec.
- 1926 – "Sugar" is a song by Maceo Pinkard, Edna Alexander and Sidney D. Mitchell. It was first recorded by Ethel Waters in 1926 and popularized as a standard by Eddie Condon's 1927 recording that featured first-timers Gene Krupa, Joe Sullivan and Frank Teschemacher. The song is also known as "That Sugar Baby o' Mine", and is not to be confused by another song named "Sugar" from 1927, written by Jack Yellen, Milton Ager, Frank Crum and Red Nichols.
- 1927 – "Blue Skies" is a show tune by Irving Berlin from the musical Betsy. Richard Rodgers and Lorenz Hart had originally written a solo number for Belle Baker, titled "This Funny World", but the star was unsatisfied with the song and asked Berlin to write a show-stopper for the musical. Berlin responded with "Blue Skies", and on the opening night the audience demanded 24 encores of Baker's song. A 1927 rendition by Ben Selvin and His Orchestra, recorded under the name "The Knickerbockers", became a number one hit. Al Jolson performed the song in 1927 in the first ever feature-length sound film, The Jazz Singer. Jazz renditions include Benny Goodman's 1938 concert in Carnegie Hall and Tommy Dorsey's 1941 recording with young Frank Sinatra on vocals.
- 1927 – "'S Wonderful" is a show tune from the Broadway musical Funny Face, composed by George Gershwin with lyrics by Ira Gershwin. It was introduced on stage by Adele Astaire and Allen Kearns. The vocalist most associated with the song is Fred Astaire, who recorded it in 1952 accompanied by Oscar Peterson's band. Astaire also sang the song with Audrey Hepburn in the 1957 musical film Funny Face. Stan Getz's 1950 recording with Horace Silver revived the tune as a jazz standard.

== 1928 ==
- "Basin Street Blues" is a blues song written by Spencer Williams and introduced by Louis Armstrong. Trombonist and singer Jack Teagarden recorded the song several times, first in 1929 with the Louisiana Rhythm Kings. Teagarden's 1931 recording with The Charleston Chasers, led by Benny Goodman, popularized the song. An additional verse was later added by Teagarden and Glenn Miller, who also claimed to have written the lyrics for the chorus.
- "Crazy Rhythm" is a show tune composed by Roger Wolfe Kahn and Joseph Meyer with lyrics by Irving Caesar. It was introduced in the Broadway musical Here's Howe by Ben Bernie, who also made a successful vocal recording. Roger Wolfe Kahn and His Orchestra recorded it the same year with vocalist Franklyn Baur. The song has inspired the names of several albums, jazz groups, organizations and nightclubs.
- "Creole Love Call" is a jazz composition by Duke Ellington, James "Bubber" Miley and Rudy Jackson. It was based on the melody of "Camp Meeting Blues" by Joe "King" Oliver. Ellington's recording is known for the wordless vocal performance by Adelaide Hall. The tune is also known as "Creole Love Song".
- "I Can't Give You Anything but Love, Baby" is an American popular song and jazz standard by Jimmy McHugh (music) and Dorothy Fields (lyrics). The song was introduced by Adelaide Hall at Les Ambassadeurs Club in New York in January 1928 in Lew Leslie's Blackbird Revue, which opened on Broadway later that year as the highly successful Blackbirds of 1928 (518 performances), wherein it was performed by Adelaide Hall, Aida Ward, and Willard McLean. Andy Razaf's biographer Harry Singer offers circumstantial evidence that suggests Fats Waller might have sold the melody to McHugh in 1926 and that the lyrics were by Andy Razaf. Jazz-oriented artists who have recorded the song include Louis Armstrong, Duke Ellington, Ella Fitzgerald, Oscar Peterson, Lester Young, Ethel Waters, Billie Holiday, and Benny Goodman.
- "If I Had You" is a popular ballad by Irving King (a pseudonym for James Campbell and Reginald Connelly) and Ted Shapiro. It was popularized in Britain by Al Bowlly with Fred Elizalde and His Orchestra, and shortly thereafter by Rudy Vallée in the United States. It was marketed as "the favorite fox-trot of the Prince of Wales". The first jazz recording was made in 1941 by Benny Goodman's sextet. Art Blakey recorded a memorable ballad version with saxophonist Lou Donaldson in 1954.
- "Lover, Come Back to Me" is a show tune from the Broadway show The New Moon, composed by Sigmund Romberg with lyrics by Oscar Hammerstein II. Paul Whiteman, the Arden-Ohman Orchestra and Rudy Vallée all recorded hit versions in 1929 while the musical was running. Billie Holiday performed the song on several records, first in 1944. Nat King Cole revived the song in 1953. A part of the composition was based on Pyotr Tchaikovsky's Barcarolle.
- "Mack the Knife" is a song from The Threepenny Opera, composed by Kurt Weill with lyrics by Bertolt Brecht. Originally called "Die Moritat von Mackie Messer" in German, the song was translated into English by Marc Blitzstein in 1954. The first jazz recording was made by Sidney Bechet in 1954 under the title "La Complainte de Mackie". Louis Armstrong's 1955 version established the song's popularity in the jazz world. It is also known as "The Ballad of Mack the Knife".
- "Nagasaki" is a jazz song composed by Harry Warren with lyrics by Mort Dixon. The Ipana Troubadors made a hit recording in 1928, and in 1935 it was recorded by the Friar's Society Orchestra. The most famous jazz versions were made by Benny Goodman in 1936 and 1947. Fletcher Henderson played it in 1934 in the Harlem Opera House as the "national anthem of Harlem".
- "Softly, As in a Morning Sunrise" is a song from the Broadway show The New Moon, composed by Sigmund Romberg with lyrics by Oscar Hammerstein II. The first jazz recording was made by Artie Shaw in 1938. The tune was a regular number in the Modern Jazz Quartet's repertoire; it was already considered a standard when the group recorded their first rendition in 1952.
- "Sweet Lorraine" is a song composed by Cliff Burwell with lyrics by Mitchell Parish. Recorded by Jimmie Noone's Apex Club Orchestra August 23, 1928, it became Noone's theme song. Teddy Wilson's version was the first to make the pop charts in 1935. The song is closely associated with Nat King Cole, who recorded it in 1940 and several times afterwards. Cole's singing career started in 1938 when a customer badgered him to sing along with his instrumental trio; the first song he sang was "Sweet Lorraine", which he heard Noone's band play in Chicago when he was nine years old.

== 1929 ==
- "Ain't Misbehavin'" is a song from the musical revue Hot Chocolates, composed by Fats Waller and Harry Brooks with lyrics by Andy Razaf. Leo Reisman and His Orchestra was the first to take the song to the pop charts in 1929, followed by several artists including Bill Robinson, Gene Austin and Louis Armstrong. At the intermission of Hot Chocolates at the Hudson Theatre, Armstrong made his Broadway debut playing a trumpet solo on the song. Waller's original instrumental recording was inducted into the Grammy Hall of Fame in 1984.
- "Black and Blue" is a song from the musical Hot Chocolates, composed by Fats Waller with lyrics by Harry Brooks and Andy Razaf. It was introduced by Louis Armstrong. Ethel Waters's 1930 version became a hit. The song is also known as "What Did I Do to Be So Black and Blue".
- "Honeysuckle Rose" is a song from the musical revue Load of Coal, composed by Fats Waller with lyrics by Andy Razaf. It was popularized by Fletcher Henderson and His Orchestra in 1933. Waller's 1934 recording of the song was inducted into the Grammy Hall of Fame in 1999. Benny Goodman's Orchestra played a 16-minute jam session on the tune in their 1938 Carnegie Hall concert, featuring members from the bands of Count Basie and Duke Ellington. Charlie Parker used a part of the song's harmony in "Scrapple from the Apple" (1947).
- "Just You, Just Me" is a song from the film Marianne, composed by Jesse Greer with lyrics by Raymond Klages. It was introduced by Marion Davies and Cliff Edwards. Lester Young recorded the tune several times. Thelonious Monk's 1948 composition "Evidence" was loosely based on it.
- "Liza (All the Clouds'll Roll Away)" is a show tune from the Broadway musical Show Girl, composed by George Gershwin with lyrics by Ira Gershwin and Gus Kahn. It was introduced on stage by Ruby Keeler and Dixie Dugan, accompanied by the Duke Ellington Orchestra. Keeler's husband and popular singer Al Jolson appeared at the opening performance and sang a chorus of the song from the third row, creating a sensation and popularizing the song.
- "Mean to Me" is a song composed by Fred E. Ahlert with lyrics by Roy Turk. It was first recorded by Ruth Etting. The song was a regular number in Billie Holiday's repertoire, and Holiday's 1937 recording with saxophonist Lester Young is considered the definitive vocal version. Young later made an instrumental recording with Nat King Cole and Buddy Rich.
- "More Than You Know" is a Broadway show tune composed by Vincent Youmans with lyrics by Edward Eliscu and Billy Rose. Introduced by Mayo Methot in Great Day, the song became a hit even though the musical only lasted for 29 performances. Ruth Etting took it to number nine in 1930, and saxophonist Benny Carter played an acclaimed trumpet solo on his 1939 recording, despite the trumpet not being his main instrument.
- "Rockin' Chair" is a song by Hoagy Carmichael. It was first recorded by Louis Armstrong in a duet with the composer. Carmichael has said that he wrote the song as a kind of sequel to his 1926 "Washboard Blues", which had lyrics by Fred Callahan. The song was made famous by Mildred Bailey, who used it as her theme song. Bailey's first hit recording was made in 1937.
- "Stardust" is a song composed by Hoagy Carmichael with lyrics by Mitchell Parish. Originally recorded by Carmichael as a mid-tempo jazz instrumental, the 1930 romantic ballad rendition by Isham Jones and His Orchestra became a top-selling hit. Louis Armstrong recorded an influential ballad rendition in 1931. The song is arguably the most recorded popular song, and one of the top jazz standards. Billboard magazine conducted a poll of leading disk jockeys in 1955 on the "popular song record of all time"; four different renditions of "Stardust" made it to the list, including Glenn Miller's (1941) at third place and Artie Shaw's (1940) at number one. The title was spelled "Star Dust" in the 1929 publication, and both spellings are used.
- "What Is This Thing Called Love?" is a song written by Cole Porter for the musical revue Wake Up and Dream. It was introduced by Elsie Carlisle in London. Ben Bernie's and Fred Rich's recordings made the charts in 1930. One of the best-known instrumental versions was recorded by Clifford Brown and Max Roach with Sonny Rollins in 1956. The song's chord progression has inspired several later compositions, including Tadd Dameron's bebop standard "Hot House".

== Bibliography ==
=== Reference works ===
- Anderson, Gene Henry; Budds, Michael J. (2007). The Original Hot Five Recordings of Louis Armstrong. Pendragon Press. ISBN 978-1-57647-120-3.
- Bogdanov, Vladimir; Woodstra, Chris; Erlewine, Stephen Thomas (2002). All Music Guide to Jazz: The Definitive Guide to Jazz Music. Backbeat Books. ISBN 978-0-87930-717-2.
- Brooks, Tim; Spottswood, Richard Keith (2004). Lost Sounds: Blacks and the Birth of the Recording Industry, 1890–1919. University of Illinois Press. ISBN 978-0-252-02850-2.
- Charters, Samuel Barclay (2008). A Trumpet Around the Corner: The Story of New Orleans Jazz. Univ. Press of Mississippi. ISBN 978-1-57806-898-2.
- Cipolla, Frank; Hunsberger, Donald (2006). Wind Band Activity in and Around New York CA. 1830–1950. Alfred Publishing. ISBN 978-0-7390-3892-5.
- Collier, James Lincoln (1985). Louis Armstrong: An American Genius. Oxford University Press US. ISBN 978-0-19-503727-2.
- Crawford, Richard; Magee, Jeffrey (1992). Jazz Standards on Record, 1900–1942: A Core Repertory. Center for Black Music Rsrch. ISBN 978-0-929911-03-8.
- Driggs, Frank; Haddix, Chuck (2006). Kansas City Jazz: From Ragtime to Bebop—A History. Oxford University Press US. ISBN 978-0-19-530712-2.
- Everett, William A.; Laird, Paul R. (2002). The Cambridge Companion to the Musical. Cambridge University Press. ISBN 978-0-521-79639-2.
- Furia, Philip (1992). The Poets of Tin Pan Alley: A History of America's Great Lyricists. Oxford University Press US. ISBN 978-0-19-507473-4.
- Furia, Philip; Lasser, Michael L. (2006). America's Songs: The Stories Behind the Songs of Broadway, Hollywood, and Tin Pan Alley. CRC Press. ISBN 978-0-415-97246-8.
- Giddins, Gary (2000). Visions of Jazz: The First Century. Oxford University Press US. ISBN 978-0-19-513241-0.
- Giddins, Gary (2004). Weather Bird: Jazz at the Dawn of Its Second Century. Oxford University Press US. ISBN 978-0-19-515607-2.
- Gioia, Ted (2012). The Jazz Standards: A Guide to the Repertoire. Oxford University Press US. ISBN 978-0-19-993739-4.
- Hischak, Thomas S. (2007). The Rodgers and Hammerstein Encyclopedia. Greenwood Publishing Group. ISBN 978-0-313-34140-3.
- Hoffmann, Frank W.; Ferstler, Howard (2005). Encyclopedia of Recorded Sound. CRC Press. ISBN 978-0-415-93835-8.
- Jasen, David A.; Jones, Gordon Gene (1998). Spreadin' Rhythm Around: Black Popular Songwriters, 1880–1930. Schirmer Books. ISBN 978-0-02-864742-5.
- Jasen, David A. (2002). A Century of American Popular Music: 2000 Best-Loved and Remembered Songs (1899–1999). Taylor & Francis. ISBN 978-0-415-93700-9.
- Jasen, David A. (2003). Tin Pan Alley: An Encyclopedia of the Golden Age of American Song. Taylor & Francis. ISBN 978-0-415-93877-8.
- Jasen, David A. (2007). Ragtime: An Encyclopedia, Discography, and Sheetography. CRC Press. ISBN 978-0-415-97862-0.
- Kenney, William Howland (1993). Chicago Jazz: A Cultural History, 1904–1930. Oxford University Press US. ISBN 978-0-19-509260-8.
- Kernfeld, Barry Dean (1995). The Blackwell Guide to Recorded Jazz. Wiley-Blackwell. ISBN 978-0-631-19552-8.
- Lawrence, A. H. (2001). Duke Ellington and His World. Routledge. ISBN 978-0-415-93012-3.
- Lichtenstein, Grace; Dankner, Laura (1993). Musical Gumbo: The Music of New Orleans. W.W. Norton. ISBN 978-0-393-03468-4.
- Magee, Jeffrey (2005). The Uncrowned King of Swing: Fletcher Henderson and Big Band Jazz. Oxford University Press US. ISBN 978-0-19-509022-2.
- Martin, Henry; Waters, Keith (2005). Jazz: The First 100 Years. Cengage Learning. ISBN 978-0-534-62804-8.
- Nettl, Bruno; Russell, Melinda (1998). In the Course of Performance: Studies in the World of Musical Improvisation. University of Chicago Press. ISBN 978-0-226-57410-3.
- Nollen, Scott Allen (2004). Louis Armstrong: The Life, Music, and Screen Career. McFarland. ISBN 978-0-7864-1857-2.
- Oliphant, Dave (1996). Texan Jazz. University of Texas Press. ISBN 978-0-292-76045-5.
- Phillips, Mark (2002). Heinemann GCSE music. Heinemann. ISBN 978-0-435-81318-5.
- Rawlins, Robert (2015). Tunes of the Twenties: And All That Jazz. Rookwood House. ISBN 978-0-9965949-0-5.
- Ruhlmann, William (2004). Breaking Records: 100 Years of Hits. Routledge. ISBN 978-0-415-94305-5.
- Schuller, Gunther (1986). Early Jazz: Its Roots and Musical Development. Oxford University Press US. ISBN 978-0-19-504043-2.
- Schuller, Gunther (1991). The Swing Era: The Development of Jazz, 1930–1945. Oxford University Press US. ISBN 978-0-19-507140-5.
- Shaw, Arnold (1989). The Jazz Age: Popular Music in the 1920s. Oxford University Press US. ISBN 978-0-19-506082-9.
- Studwell, William Emmett (1994). The Popular Song Reader: A Sampler of Well-Known Twentieth-Century Songs. Routledge. ISBN 978-1-56024-369-4.
- Studwell, William Emmett; Baldin, Mark (2000). The Big Band Reader: Songs Favored by Swing Era Orchestras and Other Popular Ensembles. Haworth Press. ISBN 978-0-7890-0914-2.
- Sudhalter, Richard M. (2003). Stardust Melody: The Life and Music of Hoagy Carmichael. Oxford University Press US. ISBN 978-0-19-516898-3.
- Tucker, Mark (1995). Ellington: The Early Years. University of Illinois Press. ISBN 978-0-252-06509-5.
- Tucker, Mark; Ellington, Duke (1995). The Duke Ellington reader. Oxford University Press US. ISBN 978-0-19-509391-9.
- Wilder, Alec; Maher, James T. (1972). American Popular Song: The Great Innovators, 1900–1950. Oxford University Press US. ISBN 978-0-19-501445-7.
- Wintz, Cary D.; Finkelman, Paul (2004). Encyclopedia of the Harlem Renaissance. Taylor & Francis. ISBN 978-1-57958-458-0.
- Woideck, Carl (1998). Charlie Parker: His Music and Life. University of Michigan Press. ISBN 978-0-472-08555-2.
- Zinsser, William (2006). Easy to Remember: The Great American Songwriters and Their Songs. David R. Godine Publisher. ISBN 978-1-56792-325-4.
- Williams, Iain Cameron Underneath a Harlem Moon: The Harlem to Paris Years of Adelaide Hall. Bloomsbury Publishers, ISBN 0-8264-5893-9
