= The Vivacious One =

Studio album by Ann-Margret
- Released: 1962
- Genre: Jazz; pop
- Label: RCA Victor
- Producer: Dick Peirce

Ann-Margret chronology
On the Way Up (1962)	The Vivacious One (1962)	Bachelors' Paradise (1963)

Professional ratings
Review scores
Source	Rating
AllMusic	3/5 stars

The Vivacious One is the third album by Swedish-American actress and singer Ann-Margret released by RCA Victor in 1962. It was her second album released in 1962 after On the Way Up.

Billboard Magazine noted that the release was "a lively album by the personable and vivacious Ann-Margret" and "a real pleaser...a fine collection belted out with savvy on this bright new disk."

In their review of the album, Cashbox noted that the singer "comes up with the a bag of sparkling goodies for her third LP outing...lark turns in a real pro performance that should win her a flock of new fans."

== Track listing ==
Side one
No.	Title	Writer(s)	Length
1.	"There'll Be Some Changes Made"	Benton Overstreet, Billy Higgins	2:05
2.	"I Was Only Kidding"	Gerry Goffin, Carole King	2:35
3.	"Make Love to Me"	Bill Norvas, Alan Copeland, Leon Roppolo, Paul Mares, Ben Pollack, George Brunies, Mel Stitzel, Walter Melrose	2:52
4.	"Tell Me, Tell Me"	Bob Merrill	2:22
5.	"Please Don't Talk About Me When I'm Gone"	Sam H. Stept, Sidney Clare	2:05
6.	"C'est si bon"	Henri Betti, Jerry Seelen	3:07

Side two
No.	Title	Writer(s)	Length
1.	"The Rock and Roll Waltz"	Shorty Allen, Roy Alfred	2:36
2.	"Jim Dandy"	Lincoln Chase	2:44
3.	"Thirteen Men"	Dickie Thompson	2:41
4.	"Señor Blues"	Horace Silver	2:55
5.	"Inka Dinka Doo"	Ben Ryan, James Francis "Jimmy" Durante	2:00
6.	"Begin the Beguine"	Cole Porter	3:20

== Personnel ==
- Ann-Margret – vocals
- H.B. Barnum – conducting
- Dick Peirce – producer
