= Croonin' =

Studio album by Anne Murray
- Released: November 2, 1993
- Studios: Sounds Interchange (Toronto, Ontario, Canada)
- Genres: Country, pop standards
- Length: 61:17
- Labels: EMI Canada; SBK (US); Capitol
- Producers: Anne Murray (co-producer); Tommy West

Anne Murray chronology
15 of the Best (1992)	Croonin' (1993)	The Best…So Far (1994)

Professional ratings
Review scores
Source	Rating
Allmusic	3/5 stars

Croonin' is the twenty-seventh studio album by Canadian country vocalist Anne Murray. It was released by EMI Music Canada and SBK Records on November 2, 1993. The album peaked at number 1 on the RPM Country Albums chart. Heartland Records put out a Croonin' album with two bonus tracks, and Murray sings Perry Como's hit "Round and Round" and Dean Martin's hit "Memories Are Made of This." This album was also released on vinyl LP.

== Track listing ==
No.	Title	Writer(s)	Length
1.	"Old Cape Cod"	Allan Jeffrey, Claire Rothrock, Milton Yakus	3:02
2.	"The Wayward Wind"	Stanley Lebowsky, Herb Newman	3:43
3.	"Secret Love"	Sammy Fain, Paul Francis Webster	3:56
4.	"Fever"	Eddie Cooley, John Davenport	3:22
5.	"When I Fall in Love"	Edward Heyman, Victor Young	3:34
6.	"Allegheny Moon"	Al Hoffman, Dick Manning	3:42
7.	"You Belong to Me"	Pee Wee King, Chilton Price, Redd Stewart	3:05
8.	"Born to Be with You"	Don Robertson	2:43
9.	"True Love"	Cole Porter	2:36
10.	"Teach Me Tonight"	Sammy Cahn, Gene de Paul	2:41
11.	"Cry Me a River"	Arthur Hamilton	4:07
12.	"Make Love to Me"	George Brunies, Alan Copeland, Paul Mares, Walter Melrose, Bill Norvas, Ben Pollack, Leon Roppolo, Mel Stitzel	2:49
13.	"Hey There"	Richard Adler, Jerry Ross	3:05
14.	"It Only Hurts for a Little While"	Mack David, Fred Spielman	2:43
15.	"I'm Confessin' (That I Love You)/I'm a Fool to Care"	Ted Daffan, Doc Daugherty, Al Neiburg, Ellis Reynolds	4:19
16.	"Wanted"	Jack Fulton, Lois Steele	3:06
17.	"I Really Don't Want to Know"	Howard Barnes, Robertson	4:41
18.	"Moments to Remember"	Robert Allen, Al Stillman	3:04

== Personnel ==
Musicians

- Anne Murray – lead vocals, backing vocals
- Doug Riley – acoustic piano, Fender Rhodes, Hammond B3 organ
- Steve Sexton – synthesizers
- Mike "Pepe" Francis – acoustic rhythm guitars, electric rhythm guitars, classical guitar
- Bob Mann – acoustic lead guitars, electric lead guitars
- Peter Cardinali – bass
- Barry Keane – drums, percussion
- Peter Appleyard – vibraphone
- Brian Leonard – marimba
- Vern Dorge – alto saxophone, soprano saxophone, tenor saxophone
- Melvin Berman – oboe
- Guido Basso – flugelhorn, harmonica
- Richard Armin – cello
- Terrence Helmer – viola
- Adele Armin – violin
- Vern Tarnowsky – violin
- Shirley Eikhard – backing vocals
- Bruce Murray – backing vocals
- Colina Phillips – backing vocals
- Debbie Schaal Ankeny – backing vocals
- Tommy West – backing vocals, lead vocals (9)
- Vivienne Williams – backing vocals

Music arrangements

- Doug Riley – string quartet arrangements and conductor (1, 3, 5, 6, 9, 18), oboe arrangements (3, 5)
- Peter Cardinali – string quartet arrangements and conductor (7, 10, 13, 14, 16, 17), oboe arrangements (13)

== Production ==
- Balmur Limited – executive producers
- Tommy West – producer
- Anne Murray – co-producer
- Kevin Doyle – recording, mixing
- Dany Tremblay – assistant engineer
- Bob Ludwig – mastering at Gateway Mastering (Portland, Maine, USA)
- Scott Thornley – cover design
- Denise Grant – photography
- Lee Kinoshita-Bevington – wardrobe stylist
- Sheila Yakimov – hair stylist
- George Abbott – make-up

== Charts ==
Chart performance for Croonin'
Chart (1993)	Peak position
Australian Albums (ARIA)	60
Canadian RPM Country Albums	1
Canadian RPM Top Albums	14
New Zealand Albums (RMNZ)	20
US Billboard Top Country Albums	54
