= Sidney Arodin =

American jazz clarinetist and songwriter (1901–1948)

Sidney Arnandan or Arnondrin or Arnondin, better known as Sidney Arodin (March 29, 1901, Westwego, Louisiana - February 6, 1948, New Orleans) was an American jazz clarinetist and songwriter, best known for co-writing the jazz and pop standard "Lazy River" with Hoagy Carmichael.

Arodin began playing clarinet at age 15 and played at local New Orleans gatherings and on riverboats. He made his way to New York City and played with Johnny Stein's New Orleans Jazz Band from 1922. He played with Jimmy Durante in the middle of the decade, then returned to Louisiana to play with Wingy Manone and Sharkey Bonano. In the 1930s he worked with Louis Prima and with a reconstituted version of the New Orleans Rhythm Kings which also featured Manone. After 1941, Arodin's poor health prevented him from playing frequently live, but before this time he recorded with Johnnie Miller, Albert Brunies, Monk Hazel, and the Jones-Collins Astoria Hot Eight. The oft-repeated claim that many of his performances are mistakenly credited on original recordings to Charlie Cordella is unsubstantiated.
