= Friar's Inn =

Nightclub and speakeasy in Chicago, Illinois

Coordinates: 41.8771°N 87.6258°W

Friar's Inn (also called New Friar's Inn) was a nightclub and speakeasy in Chicago, Illinois, a famed jazz music venue in the 1920s.

Though some sources refer to it casually as "Friar's Club", it was not related to the New York Friars Club.

Located in a basement at 60 East Van Buren or 343 South Wabash in the Chicago Loop, the establishment was owned by Mike Fritzel and attracted gangsters as well as fans of jazz music.

Among the notable bands associated with Friar's Inn were the New Orleans Rhythm Kings (originally the Friar's Society Orchestra) and the Austin High Gang (also known as the Blue Friars).

Noted musicians who played at Friar's Inn included Frank Teschemacher, Bud Freeman, Steve Brown, George Brunies, Merritt Brunies, Emmett Hardy, Paul Mares, Leon Roppolo, Bee Palmer, Louis 'Lou' Black, and Mel Stitzel. Joan Crawford worked as a dancer at the Friar's Inn early in her career.

== See also ==
- List of jazz clubs
