= Make Love to Me (1954 song) =

Single by Jo Stafford
- Released: 1953
- Songwriters: Bill Norvas, Alan Copeland, Leon Roppolo, Paul Mares, Ben Pollack, George Brunies, Mel Stitzel, Walter Melrose

Jo Stafford singles chronology
"Way Down Yonder in New Orleans" (1953)	"Make Love to Me" (1953)	"Indiscretion" (1954)

"Make Love to Me" is a 1954 popular song with words and music written by a larger team than normally is known to collaborate on a song: Bill Norvas, Alan Copeland, and the New Orleans Rhythm Kings, comprising Leon Rappolo, Paul Mares, Ben Pollack, George Brunies, Mel Stitzel, and Walter Melrose. The melody was derived from a 1923 song, "Tin Roof Blues", composed by the New Orleans Rhythm Kings.

== Vintage recordings ==
The best-known version of the song was recorded by Jo Stafford on December 8, 1953 (released by Columbia Records as catalog number 40143, with the flip side "Adi-Adios Amigo",) and in 1954 the #1 position on the Billboard chart went back and forth between this record and Doris Day's "Secret Love" (See 1954 in music#US No. 1 hit singles). On Cash Box magazine's charts, however, the song only reached #2. The same year, the song was covered in the United Kingdom by Alma Cogan and Billie Anthony.

The recording by Alma Cogan with Ken Mackintosh and his orchestra was recorded in London on February 16, 1954. It was released in 1954 by EMI on the His Master's Voice label as catalog numbers B 10677 and 7M 196. The flip side was "Said the Little Moment".

Other covers were recorded by:

- The Commanders (recorded February 2, 1954, released by Decca Records as catalog number 29048, with the flip side "Kentucky Boogie"
- the Tommy Dorsey orchestra (with Jimmy Dorsey and vocal by Gordon Polk) (recorded January 1954, released by Bell Records as catalog number 1029, flip side "My Friend the Ghost")

Peter Spar put Danish lyrics to the song under the title "Vær sød mod mig". Recorded in Copenhagen in 1954 by Raquel Rastenni (acc. Harry Felbert's sextet, Cond.: Harry Felbert) the track – arranged by Erik Kaare – was released on His Master's Voice X 8208.

== Remakes ==
The Kalin Twins recorded "Make Love to Me" on June 24, 1960: this version would remain un-issued as 45 rpm or LP by Decca Records until 1992, released by Bear Family Records in CD format under album When - The Kalin Twins as catalog number BCD 15597.

"Make Love to Me" would become an R&B chart hit via a duet remake by Johnny Thunder and Ruby Winters recorded in Nashville early in 1967. Before Diamond Records president Phil Kahl left New York City with the intent of producing distinct Nashville sessions for Thunder and Winters, Diamond Records co-president Joe Kolsky had suggested that Kahl record Winters and Thunder as a duo, Kolsky having noted the recent chart success of the Peaches and Herb remake of the traditional pop standard "Let's Fall in Love" and also the current Marvin Gaye/Kim Weston hit duet "It Takes Two". Kahl resultantly co-produced – with Buddy Killen – Winters and Thunder's duet recordings of "Make Love to Me" and also another 1950s pop hit "Teach Me Tonight": opted for as A-side, "Make Love to Me" reached #13 R&B in April 1967 also registering on the Billboard Hot 100 at #96.

The song was also included on Anne Murray's tribute-to-the-fifties album, Croonin', where it was released as the first single, becoming a top 10 hit on both pop and country charts in Canada.

"Make Love to Me" has also been recorded by Louis Prima and Keely Smith (album Louis and Keely!/ 1959), Kitty Kallen (1960), Ann-Margret (album The Vivacious One/ 1962), Chubby Checker and Dee Dee Sharp (album Down To Earth/ 1962), Molly Bee (album Good Golly Ms Molly/ 1975) and B. B. King (album Blues 'N' Jazz/ 1983).

=== Chart performance/ Anne Murray ===
Chart (1993)	Peak position
Canada Top Singles (RPM)	43
Canada Adult Contemporary (RPM)	3
Canada Country Singles (RPM)	6

Year-end chart (1993)	Position
Canada Adult Contemporary Tracks (RPM)	8
Canada Country Tracks (RPM)	63
