= Emmett Hardy =

American jazz cornet player (1903–1925)

- Hardy performing with The Carlisle Evans Band in 1921

Background information
- Born: Emmett Louis Hardy; June 12, 1903
- Origin: Gretna, Louisiana, U.S.
- Died: June 16, 1925 (aged 22)
- Genres: Jazz
- Occupation: Musician
- Instrument: Cornet

Emmett Louis Hardy (June 12, 1903 – June 16, 1925) was an American jazz cornet player during the early 1900s.

== Early life ==
Hardy was born in the New Orleans suburb of Gretna, Louisiana, United States, and lived much of his life in the Algiers neighborhood, on the west bank of New Orleans. Hardy was a child prodigy, described as already playing marvelously in his early teens. Some New Orleans musicians remembered as a musical highlight of their lives, a 1919 cutting contest where, after long and intense struggle, Hardy succeeded in outplaying Louis Armstrong. (It is likely that Armstrong, although two years older than Hardy, had not yet hit his full stride at that time.)

== Career ==
In Hardy's early teens, he was a member of Papa Jack Laine's band, then worked in the Carlisle Evans Band and Norman Brownlee's Orchestra of New Orleans. He belonged to a small band that supported singer Bee Palmer. After moving to Chicago, he became a member of the New Orleans Rhythm Kings. For a time during its Friar's Inn residency/ the NORK used a two-cornet format – Paul Mares, leader and first cornet, and Emmett Hardy as second. As with other New Orleans jazz bands of that time (such as King Oliver's Creole Jazz Band and The Original Tuxedo Orchestra), the more creative player played the second part, with the first cornet staying closer to the lead line. Hardy did not appear on any of the Rhythm Kings recording sessions, never making any commercial recordings before his early death.

After returning to New Orleans in the early 1920s, he led his own band and played in the band of Norman Brownlee.

== Technique ==
Hardy's playing is described as being more lyrical than many of his New Orleans contemporaries, but with a driving rhythm. His tone was much admired.

"Emmet... always preferred playing in some screwy, plenty tough keys like B-natural, F-sharp, C-sharp, D-flat, and E-natural, using all those keys on one tune and making his own modulations into and out of choruses. His tone was pure and wonderful and it sorta rolled forth, except with a drive like I've never heard anyone else get." —Monk Hazel, Down Beat magazine, May 15, 1940

Hardy was an important influence on Bix Beiderbecke, and Monk Hazel pointed out that Beiderbecke on the Wolverines records sounded very much like Hardy.

"It’s no wonder that later, after the Wolverine era when Bix was forging ahead with Goldkette and Whiteman, Beiderbecke modestly paid tribute to Hardy as his greatest inspiration, and that he even wrote Emmet’s mother late in 1925 saying 'Emmet was the greatest musician I have ever heard. If ever I can come near your son’s greatness I'll die happy.'"—Dave Dexter Jr., Down Beat, June 1, 1940

== Personality ==
Hardy also did metal work, made his own mouthpieces for his horn, and modified his cornet to add an additional spit-valve. A relative remembered Hardy as being somewhat shy and unassuming, with a good dry sense of humor; that he was easily frightened by sudden loud noises, and superstitious about passing by graveyards.

== Illness and death ==
When advancing tuberculosis started to make breathing difficult, Hardy taught himself banjo so he could continue playing music.

Hardy and some of his musician friends made some home recordings on wax phonograph cylinders for their own amusement. As Hardy's tuberculosis worsened and his death seemed inevitable, the friends decided to preserve the cylinders as a memento of Hardy's playing. At least one cylinder survived to the start of the 1950s; the relative who heard it then said Hardy's playing reminded him of Sharkey Bonano. When Tulane University's Jazz Archive was established in the late 1950s, however, a diligent search failed to turn up any of these recordings, which are presumed lost forever.

Hardy died of tuberculosis in New Orleans, just four days after his 22nd birthday, and was buried in Gretna, Louisiana.
