= Farewell Blues =

Song performed by Cab Calloway

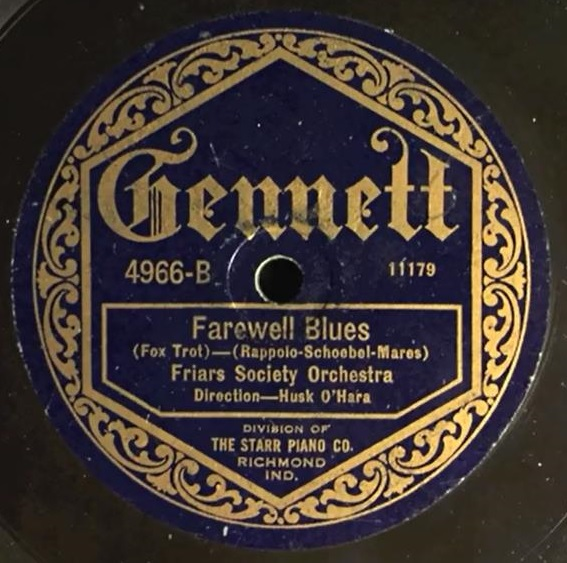
1922 78 released on Gennett Records.

"Farewell Blues" is a 1922 jazz standard written by Paul Mares, Leon Roppolo and Elmer Schoebel.

It was first released by the seminal jazz band New Orleans Rhythm Kings under the name the Friars Society Orchestra.

Farewell Blues recorded by The Virginians (1923)

== Background ==
The song was recorded on August 29, 1922, in Richmond, Indiana and released as Gennett 4966A, Matrix #11179, as by the Friars Society Orchestra under the direction of Husk O'Hara. It was first released by the New Orleans Rhythm Kings under the name the Friars Society Orchestra and soon was covered by several jazz bands. A band called The Georgians recorded it in 1923, copying Roppolo's acclaimed clarinet solo note for note.

As well as the many cover versions by jazz performers during the swing era, the tune was also picked up by Hawaiian music artists in this period such as Sam Ku West and Sol Hoopii, and later by instrumentalists in other genres, such as Lester Flatt and Earl Scruggs who recorded a bluegrass arrangement of "Farewell Blues" in 1955.

== Cover versions ==
- Fletcher Henderson's Dance Players (1923)
- The Georgians (1923)
- Gus Mulcay (1926)
- Sam Ku West (1927)
- The Charleston Chasers (1928)
- Ted Lewis (1929)
- Eddie Lang & Joe Venuti's All-Star Orchestra (1931)
- Roy Smeck (1931)
- Abe Lyman (1932)
- Isham Jones Orchestra – Swinging Down the Lane (1930)
- Cab Calloway – Kicking the Gong Around (1931)
- Benny Carter – When the Lights Are Low (1936)
- Woody Herman – Blues on Parade (1937)
- Sol Hoopii (1938)
- Wingy Manone (1939)
- Eddie Condon – Dixieland All Stars (1939)
- Glenn Miller – On the Alamo (1941); V-Disc 334A; RCA Bluebird 10495B
- Count Basie – Blues by Basie (1942); Columbia 36712
- Django Reinhardt – Djangology (1948)
- Flatt and Scruggs (1951)
- Pee Wee King and His Western Swing Band (1955)
- Danny Gatton – Redneck Jazz (1978)
- Alan Munde (1980)
- Accordéon Mélancolique – Gratitude (2012); Sterkenburg Records stam010

== See also ==
- List of 1920s jazz standards
