= Bugle Call Rag =

Jazz standard

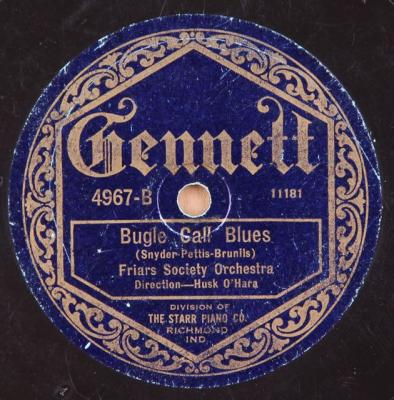
Original 1922 release under the title "Bugle Call Blues".

"Bugle Call Rag", also known as "Bugle Call Blues", is a jazz standard written by Jack Pettis, Billy Meyers and Elmer Schoebel. It was first recorded by the New Orleans Rhythm Kings in 1922 as "Bugle Call Blues", although later renditions as well as the published sheet music and the song's copyright all used the title "Bugle Call Rag". The song's hook is based on the "Assembly" bugle call.

== Background ==
The New Orleans Rhythm Kings recorded "Bugle Call Rag" on August 29, 1922 in Richmond, Indiana for Gennett Records. The recording was released as a 78 single as Gennett 4967-B with "Discontented Blues" as the A-side and as Starr 9304B as "Bugle Call Blues" as by the Friar's Society Orchestra with "Discontented Blues" as the A-side.

== Other recordings ==
The tune was popularized as a standard in renditions by Benny Goodman and Glenn Miller. It was also recorded by Duke Ellington, The Chocolate Dandies with Coleman Hawkins on saxophone, Ted Lewis, Cab Calloway, The Mills Brothers, Peanuts Hucko, Eddie Lang, Merle Travis, Bill Monroe, Nat Gonella, Syd Lawrence, Abe Lyman, Ray Noble, Earl Bostic, The Washingtonians, The Victor Military Band, Glen Gray, Meade Lux Lewis, Teddy Wilson, Johnny Dankworth, Muggsy Spanier, Harry Roy, Billy Butterfield, Doc Severinsen, Buddy Rich, Pete Fountain, Red Nichols, and Al Caiola.

== Movie appearances ==
It appears in several Hollywood films, including Phil Spitalny and His Musical Queens (1934), The Big Broadcast of 1937, Orchestra Wives (1942), Stage Door Canteen (1943), The Benny Goodman Story (1956) and The Aviator (2004).

== See also ==
- List of 1920s jazz standards
