= Merritt Brunies =

American jazz trombonist and cornetist (1895–1973)

Merritt Brunies (December 25, 1895 - February 5, 1973), was an American jazz trombonist and cornetist.

Brunies was born into a well-known musical family in New Orleans, Louisiana; among its members were George Brunies and Albert Brunies. Merritt led his own band, The Original New Orleans Jazz Band, from 1916 to 1918; this ensemble did not record, but it existed before both Jimmy Durante's New Orleans Jazz Band and the Original Dixieland Jazz Band (the latter formed shortly afterward in 1916). Following this, he formed another group which played at Friar's Inn in Chicago directly after the stint by the New Orleans Rhythm Kings. He played regularly in New Orleans in the 1930s, and moved to Mississippi in 1946, where he played with his brothers in a Dixieland jazz band until his retirement. He died in Biloxi, Mississippi.
