= Sam Ku West =

American guitarist

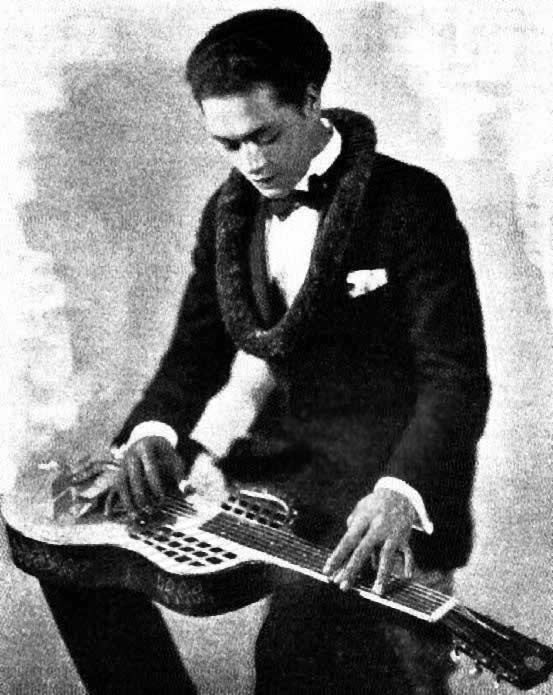
Sam Ku West

Sam Ku West (1907–1930) was an American steel guitar player from Honolulu, Hawaii. He died in Neuilly sur Seine near Paris, France.

== Career ==
West first performed professionally as a member of Irene West's touring band, adding the "West" surname to his birth name, Sam Ku, Jr.. After playing in Singapore in 1926, Prince George of England gave him the name "the Kreisler of the steel guitar". He also played concert harp live, though he never recorded with it.

West toured America on the vaudeville circuit and also performed abroad throughout East Asia and Europe. He recorded in 1927 and 1928 for several labels; 27 recordings are still extant. He died in Paris at the age of 23 on September 7, 1930.

== Discography ==
Partial listing:

Year	Title	Notes
"'Banner Records"'
ca. 1926 (?)	"St. Louis Blues" / "Memphis Blues"	with James Kohono
"'Gennet Records"'
1927	"Farewell Blues" / "Sweet Georgia Brown"
1927	"Old Joe Clark" / "Ua Like No Alike"
1927	"Cunha Medley" / "Cunha Medley"	A-side by "Kulani Trio"
1928	"Happy Heinie March" / "Walalae"
1928	"Aloha Oe" / "Strange Isles Medley"	B-side by the "Keole Brothers"
"'Victor"'
1928	"Le Ilima" / "Huehue Huehue"	A-side by "Holouha Trio"
1928	"Kawaihua Waltz" / "Maoani Ke Ala"
1928	"Palolo" / "Lepe Ulaula"
1928	"Wang Wang Blues" / "Stack O’Lee Blues"
1928	"Sunkist Hawaii" / "Na Le O Hawaii"	B-side by "Kane’s Hawaiians"
1928	"The Rosary" / "Old Black Joe"
1928	"Minnehaha" / "Drowsy Waters"
"'Vocalion Records"'
1927	"Someday Sweetheart" / "Honolulu Blues"
1927	"Hawaiian Hula" / "Sweet Hawaiian Dreams"
