= Boyce Brown =

American jazz saxophonist (1910-1959)

- Birth name: Boyce Brown
- Born: April 16, 1910
- Origin: (United States) Chicago, Illinois
- Died: January 30, 1959 (aged 48)
- Genres: Jazz
- Occupation: Saxophonist
- Instrument: Alto saxophone
- Formerly of: Wingy Manone

Boyce Brown (April 16, 1910 – January 30, 1959) was an American jazz dixieland alto saxophonist born in Chicago, Illinois.

Brown worked with Wingy Manone, Paul Mares, and Danny Alvin. His best-known recordings are a 1935 session with Paul Mares and his Friars Society Orchestra (first issued on LP in 1955 as part of Columbia's Chicago Style Jazz album) and a 1939 session with Jimmy McPartland & his Jazz Band, which was first released as part of Decca's Chicago Jazz album. In both sessions, Brown demonstrates a driving, harmonically advanced style.

In 1953, Brown entered a monastery of the Roman Catholic Servite Order, but returned in 1956 to release his one and only album as Brother Matthew, backed by a band organized by Eddie Condon.
