= Lou Black =

American musician

Louis Thomas Black (June 8, 1901 – November 18, 1965) was prominent Jazz era banjo player, part of the New Orleans Rhythm Kings during the 1920s.

== Biography ==
Born in Rock Island, Illinois, he began playing banjo during early childhood and became professional in 1917. He played in the Carlisle Dance Orchestra during the 1920s.

In 1921, he joined the famous New Orleans Rhythm Kings at Friar's Inn in Chicago. With this band, he participated to the first-ever interracial recording session with pianist Jelly Roll Morton.

He left the band in 1923 to play with other bands. These included the Dixieland Jass Band, King Oliver's Creole Jazz Band, Midway Gardens Orchestra, and Jean Goldkette's Jazz Orchestra.

From 1928 until 1931, he was a staff musician for radio station WHO in Des Moines, Iowa. He stopped playing banjo about the time the station was sold. In a later interview he said that he had become unhappy with the banjo's having been displaced in music by the guitar and the bass, until it became a "taxi-driver's instrument." He left music in 1931, but began playing again in 1961.

He sat in with several bands during a brief stay in New York City, then played gigs in Moline, Illinois from the fall of 1963.

While recovering in a Rock Island hospital from injuries sustained in an automobile accident, he suffered a fatal heart attack and died on November 18, 1965.
