= Elmer Schoebel =

American jazz pianist, composer, and arranger (1896–1970)

Elmer Schoebel (September 8, 1896 – December 14, 1970) was an American jazz pianist, composer, and arranger.

He was born in East St. Louis, Illinois, United States. Early in his career heplayed along to silent films in Champaign, Illinois After moving on to vaudeville, late in the 1910s, he played with the 20th Century Jazz Band in Chicago in 1920.

In 1922-23 he was a member of the New Orleans Rhythm Kings, then led his own band, known variously as the Midway Gardens Orchestra, the Original Memphis Melody Boys and the Chicago Blues Dance Orchestra, before joining Isham Jones in 1925. After returning to Chicago he played with Louis Panico and Art Kassel, and arranged for the Melrose Publishing House.

In the 1930s, Schoebel wrote and arranged, working as the chief arranger for the Warner Brothers publishing division. From the 1940s onward he did some performing with Conrad Janis, Blue Steele's Rhythm Rebels (1958), and with his own ensembles in St. Petersburg, Florida. He continued to play up until his death.

== Compositions ==
Schoebel wrote a number of standards, including "Bugle Call Rag", "Stomp Off, Let's Go","Nobody's Sweetheart Now", "Farewell Blues", and "Prince of Wails". "Prince of Wails" was the only composition Schoebel recorded as a leader, in 1929 as Brunswick 4652. He also wrote "I Never Knew What A Girl Could Do", "Oriental", and "Discontented Blues", while a member of the New Orleans Rhythm Kings.
