= Monk Hazel =

American jazz musician

Arthur Frank Hazel (August 15, 1903, Harvey, Louisiana - March 5, 1968, New Orleans, Louisiana), better known as Monk Hazel, was a jazz drummer and cornetist.

== Career background ==
In addition to being a drummer, Hazel occasionally took solos cornet and mellophone. Hazel performed with several bandleaders in and around New Orleans in the 1920s, among them Abbie Brunies, Tony Parenti, Jules Bauduc, and Johnny Wiggs.

Hazel's father was a drummer as well. Early on Monk played drums with Emmett Hardy, who gave him his first cornet, and then with Stalebread Lacombe. In the 1920s, Hazel worked with many bands including those led by Abbie Brunies (the Halfway House Orchestra), Tony Parenti (with whom he recorded in 1928) and Johnny Wiggs.

From the late 1920s to the early 1930s, Hazel led his own Bienville Roof Orchestra (which played atop the Bienville Hotel at Lee Circle, and made recordings in 1928) and then spent time in New York playing with Johnny Wiggs, Jack Pettis and with his own group (1929–31).

Hazel was in Hollywood for a period (working with Gene Austin) but eventually came back to New Orleans, performing with Joe Caprano (1937) and the Lloyd Danton Quintet. Hazel spent 1942-43 in the Army and then worked for a time outside of music.

During his final 20 years, Hazel was once again active in New Orleans, recording with his own band in 1945 and performing with Sharkey Bonano (1949-52), George Girard, Mike Lala, Santo Pecora and virtually every other important name in New Orleans jazz.

As a leader, Monk Hazel recorded four titles in 1928 for Brunswick Records and a full album for Southland Records in 1954; Pete Fountain and Al Hirt were among his sidemen on the latter recording.
