= Tin Roof Blues =

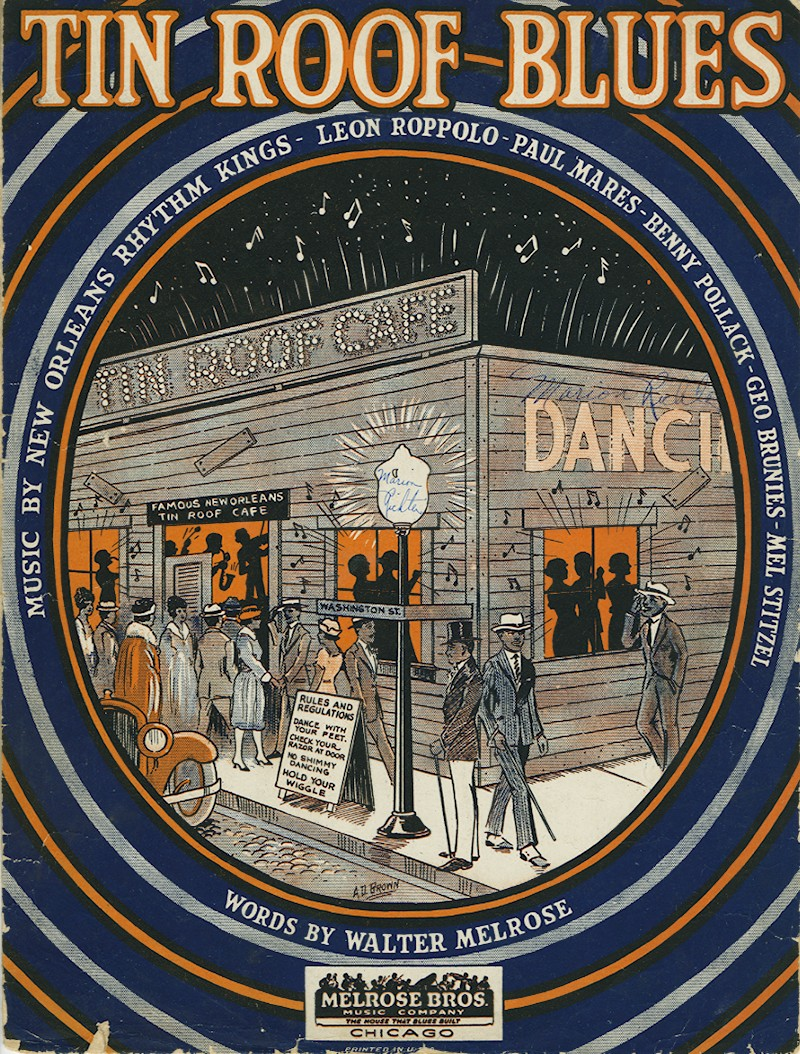
- 1923 sheet music cover

Single by New Orleans Rhythm Kings
- B-side: "That's a Plenty"
- Recorded: March 23, 1923 in Richmond, Indiana
- Genre: Jazz
- Label: Gennett
- Songwriters: George Brunies; Paul Mares; Ben Pollack; Leon Roppolo; Mel Stitzel; Walter Melrose
- 1923 recording of the song by the Original Memphis Five: file; help

"Tin Roof Blues" is a jazz composition by the New Orleans Rhythm Kings first recorded in 1923. It was written by band members Paul Mares, Ben Pollack, Mel Stitzel, George Brunies and Leon Roppolo. The tune has become a jazz standard and is one of the most recorded and often played New Orleans jazz compositions.

The 1923 sound recordings of the song entered the public domain in the United States in 2024.

== Background ==
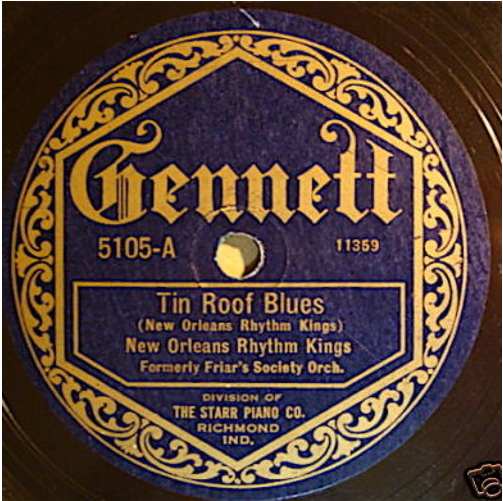
1923 release by Gennett Records

The New Orleans Rhythm Kings first recorded the number on 13 March 1923 for Gennett Records in Richmond, Indiana. The B-side was "That's a Plenty". There are three surviving alternative takes of the number from this session. The alternative takes were created as part of the phonograph recording and manufacture process; the musicians did not expect different versions to be released. The solos on the records contained less improvisation than much of later jazz and more than earlier jazz. Brunies's and Roppolo's solos were played similar but noticeably different on each of the three takes. Brunies continued to play the solo from the most famous take of the NORK recording for the rest of his career.

The sheet music was published by the Melrose Brothers Music Company in Chicago, a company that was established by Walter Melrose, who wrote lyrics for the song, and his brother, Lester Melrose. The sheet music cover was an illustration of the Tin Roof Café dance hall on Washington Avenue in New Orleans. The composers were band members George Brunies, Paul Mares, Ben Pollack, Leon Roppolo, and Mel Stitzel.

== Notable recordings ==
Louis Armstrong and the All Stars recorded the song for Columbia, which re-released it on the Columbia Hall of Fame series. Other notable recordings were made by Jelly Roll Morton in 1924, Ted Lewis, Joe "King" Oliver and His Dixie Syncopators in 1928, Wingy Manone, Sidney Bechet, Tommy Dorsey, Ray Anthony, Al Hirt, Johnny Mince, Ray Price, Roy Eldridge, Phil Napoleon, Herb Ellis, Ted Heath, Floyd Cramer, and Harry Connick Jr.

- Louis Armstrong – The California Concerts (1955)
- Sidney Bechet – 1949
- Herb Ellis with Stan Getz and Roy Eldridge – Nothing but the Blues (1957)
- Al Hirt with Pete Fountain – At the Jazz Band Ball (1957)
- Jelly Roll Morton – piano roll, 1924
- New Orleans Rhythm Kings – March 13, 1923
- King Oliver – 1928
- Lu Watters and His Yerba Buena Jazz Band – 1950
- Pat Yankee, vocal with Turk Murphy's Jazz Band, 1961

== See also ==
- List of 1920s jazz standards
