= Mel Stitzel =

Mel Stitzel (January 9, 1902 – December 31, 1952) was a German-born pianist best known for his work with the New Orleans Rhythm Kings, a leading jazz band of the early 1920s. The leading members of the group including cornetist Paul Mares, trombonist George Brunies and clarinet player Leon Roppolo were school friends from New Orleans who recruited others such as Stitzel and drummer Gene Krupa to join their band. Stitzel also played with The Bucktown Five in the early 1920s.

== Background ==
At first, the band was known as the Friar's Society Orchestra after forming to play a gig in Chicago at Friar's Inn, but changed their name to the New Orleans Rhythm Kings after their lengthy residency ended. All of the members of the New Orleans Rhythm Kings at the time of their recording session of March 1923 – Mares, Roppolo, Brunies, Stitzel, and drummer Ben Pollack – are credited as co-writers of one of the band's best-known songs: "Tin Roof Blues," which was used as the basis for "Make Love to Me," a million-seller for Jo Stafford in 1954. The band also recorded with pianist Jelly Roll Morton in one of the first multi-racial recordings in jazz.

Stitzel co-wrote "Doodle Doo Doo" with Art Kassel in 1924. He co-wrote "Bittersweet" with Ben Pollack. He also wrote the music for "The Chant" in 1926 after the Rhythm Kings broke up in 1925.
