= Squeeze Me =

1925 jazz standard composed by Fats Waller and performed by Bessie Smith

Single by Clarence Williams' Blue Five
- B-side: "Santa Claus Blues"
- Published: 1925
- Released: December 1925
- Recorded: October 26, 1925
- Genre: Jazz
- Length: 3:08
- Label: OKeh
- Composer: Fats Waller
- Lyricist: [Clarence Williams

"Squeeze Me" is a 1925 jazz standard composed by Fats Waller. It was based on an old blues song called "The Boy in the Boat". The lyrics were credited to publisher Clarence Williams, although Andy Razaf has claimed to have actually written the lyrics.

The song has been recorded by numerous artists, including Louis Armstrong, Mildred Bailey, Count Basie, Eddie Condon, Harry James, James P. Johnson, Bessie Smith, Jimmy Smith, Willie "The Lion" Smith, Dinah Washington, Tuba Skinny and Maria Muldaur.

== See also ==
- List of 1920s jazz standards
