= Steve Brown (bass player) =

American jazz musician and string bass player (1890–1965)

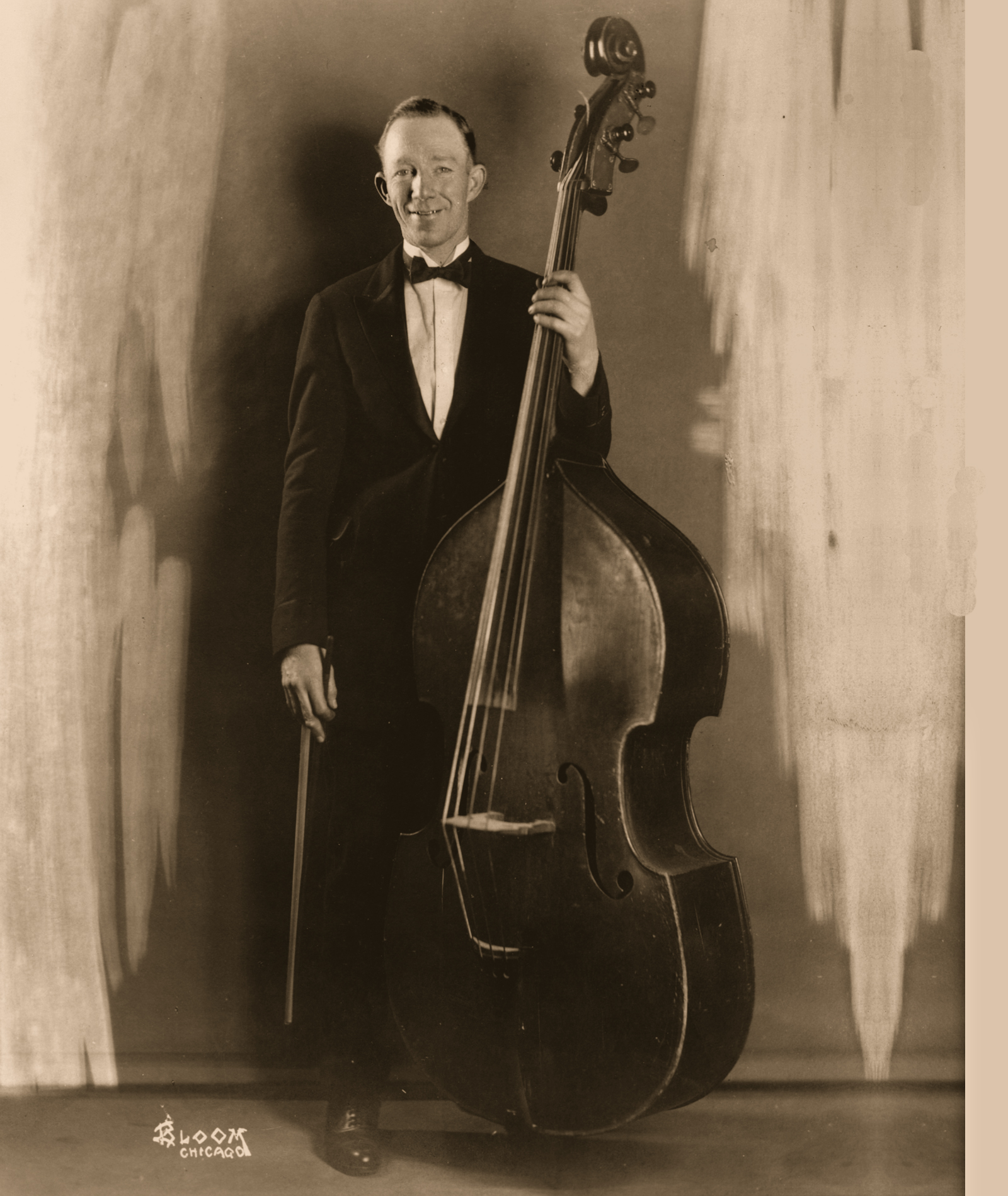

Background information
- Birth name: Theodore Brown
- Born: January 13, 1890; New Orleans, Louisiana, US
- Died: September 15, 1965 (aged 75); Detroit, Michigan
- Genres: Jazz
- Occupation: Musician
- Instrument: String bass
- Formerly of: New Orleans Rhythm Kings, Jean Goldkette, Paul Whiteman

Theodore "Steve" Brown (January 13, 1890 – September 15, 1965) was a jazz musician best known for his work on string bass. Like many New Orleans bassists, he played both string bass and tuba professionally.

Brown was the younger brother of trombonist Tom Brown. In his youth he played with his brother's band in New Orleans. Because of his devil-may-care personality he was nicknamed "Steve" after Steve Brodie, a man who became famous for jumping off the Brooklyn Bridge on a dare. Few musicians knew Brown's real name.

Brown went north to Chicago in 1915 with his brother Tom in the first wave of jazz musicians to go to the city. He was a member of the New Orleans Rhythm Kings in the early 1920s, where his slap style on bass attracted attention.

In 1924 he joined Jean Goldkette's Orchestra, with whom he remained until 1927, creating the first recordings of the style. In 1927, he joined the top-paying band in the United States, Paul Whiteman's Orchestra.

Around 1930 he settled in Detroit, Michigan, which would be his home for the rest of his life. He led his own band and continued playing with traditional jazz and Dixieland bands into the 1950s.

Wellman Braud, bass player with the Duke Ellington orchestra, once called Brown the greatest of all bass players.
