= Albert Brunies =

American jazz cornetist (1900–1978)

Albert "Abbie" Brunies (January 19, 1900 - October 2, 1978) was an American jazz cornetist.

Brunies came from a famous New Orleans musical family, which counted among its members George Brunies and Merritt Brunies. Brunies was the leader of the Halfway House Orchestra from 1919 to about 1927, playing at the Halfway House club in New Orleans. This ensemble recorded for Okeh Records in 1925. Among the musicians who played in this group were New Orleans Rhythm Kings members Charlie Cordella, Mickey Marcour, Leon Rappolo, Sidney Arodin, Bill Eastwood, Joe Loyacano and Leo Adde. He played in New Orleans into the mid-1940s, after which time he moved to Biloxi, Mississippi. There he played with Merritt in the Brunie Brothers Dixieland Jazz Band. This ensemble recorded sparsely.
