= Santo Pecora =

American jazz trombonist (1902-1984)

- Birth name: Santo Joseph Pecoraro
- Born: March 21, 1902; New Orleans, Louisiana, United States
- Died: May 29, 1984 (aged 82); New Orleans, Louisiana, U.S.
- Genres: Jazz
- Instrument: Trombone
- Formerly of: New Orleans Rhythm Kings

Santo Pecora (born Santo Joseph Pecoraro; March 21, 1902 – May 29, 1984) was an American jazz trombonist known for his longtime association with the New Orleans jazz scene.

He was born in New Orleans, Louisiana, United States. Pecora changed his name because his cousin, a drummer, was also named Santo Pecoraro. The two sometimes performed in ensembles together. Pecora began on French horn but settled on trombone as a teenager. He played in orchestras accompanying silent films as well as with the bandleaders Johnny De Droit and Leon Roppolo. He toured with singer Bee Palmer early in the 1920s, then joined the New Orleans Rhythm Kings in the middle of the decade.

He moved to Chicago late in the decade, playing both in jazz bands and in theater palaces, then became a big band sideman in the 1930s. He toured with Sharkey Bonano in the 1930s, then played with Wingy Manone in California. In the 1940s he returned to New Orleans, where he continued working with Bonano in addition to regular gigs on riverboats and at nightclubs. He remained a staple of the local scene into the 1960s.

Pecora died on May 29, 1984, in his hometown, at age 82.
