= Great Day (unfinished film) =

1930 film

- Directed by: Harry Beaumont; Harry A. Pollard
- Starring: Joan Crawford; Johnny Mack Brown; John Miljan; Anita Page; Marjorie Rambeau; John Charles Thomas
- Distributed by: Metro-Goldwyn-Mayer
- Country: United States
- Language: English

Great Day is an unfinished 1930 American pre-Code musical film, which was to star, in alphabetical order, Johnny Mack Brown, Joan Crawford, John Miljan, Anita Page, Marjorie Rambeau and John Charles Thomas.

== Plot ==
No plot due to the non-release of the film.

== Cast ==
- Joan Crawford as Roadhouse Entertainer
- Johnny Mack Brown
- John Miljan
- Anita Page
- Marjorie Rambeau
- John Charles Thomas as Leading Male

== Overview ==
Great Day began as a Vincent Youmans musical purchased by Metro-Goldwyn-Mayer to be tailored to Joan Crawford's talents. The 1929 show had not been a success on Broadway, lasting only twenty-nine performances. However, several of its songs — with lyrics by Billy Rose and Edward Eliscu — were memorable, including the title tune, another called "Without a Song" and "More Than You Know". It was the popularity of the music that encouraged MGM to acquire the rights for the film version.

Production started in the fall of 1930, but after around two weeks of shooting, the film was scrapped at considerable cost to the studio — $280,000.

MGM and Crawford mutually agreed to major rewrites to save the film with the plan to resume shooting with the revised script in 1931; it never happened, and Great Day was never released. In 1934, MGM began another attempt to make the film, this time starring Jeanette MacDonald, but this was also abandoned.
