= New Orleans Rhythm Kings =

American jazz band

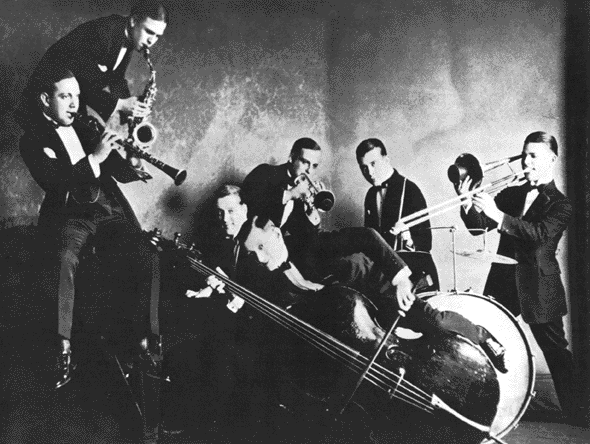
The New Orleans Rhythm Kings in 1922: (left to right) Leon Roppolo, Jack Pettis, Elmer Schoebel, Arnold Loyacano, Paul Mares, Frank Snyder, George Brunies

The New Orleans Rhythm Kings (NORK) were one of the most influential jazz bands of the early to mid-1920s. The band included New Orleans and Chicago musicians who helped shape Chicago jazz and influenced many younger jazz musicians.

They composed and recorded several jazz standards such as "Bugle Call Rag", "Milenburg Joys", "Farewell Blues", and "Tin Roof Blues". The 1954 pop song "Make Love to Me" was based on their music for "Tin Roof Blues".

== History ==
The New Orleans Rhythm Kings in its earliest stages was the creation of the drummer Mike "Ragbaby" Stevens, solely in that he sent the first telegram to Albert Brunies about going to Chicago to form a band and find better gigs than New Orleans had to offer. Albert "Abbie" Brunies and his younger brother, the trombonist George Brunies, were initially hesitant but suggested the idea to a friend, the trumpet player Paul Mares, who immediately took the opportunity.

"So I says Paul, I says, Abbie don't want to go to Chicago and I'm kind of leery, I'm afraid", George recalled. "Paul says, 'man, give me that wire. I'll go.' So Paul went up [to Chicago] and introduced himself to Ragbaby Stevens and Ragbaby liked him… and Paul got the railroad fare from his father and sent me $60".

George Brunies packed his trombone and set off to join Mares in Chicago, playing gigs and going to after-hours clubs with Mares. At one such club the pair met some of their future bandmates, the drummer Frank Snyder, the pianist Elmer Schoebel, and the saxophonist Jack Pettis.

The name "New Orleans Rhythm Kings" did not initially refer to this group but rather was the name of a group under the direction of Bee Palmer, a vaudeville performer. Palmer's group did not last, but within several months of the breakup of the band, a member of the group, the clarinetist Leon Roppolo, was playing on riverboats in Chicago with Elmer Schoebel, Jack Pettis, Frank Snyder, George Brunies, the banjoist Louis Black and (possibly) Paul Mares.

Mares, ready to move on from riverboat life, found the group an engagement at the Friar's Inn, a club owned by Mike Fritzel. The bassist Arnold Loyocano joined forces with the growing band, and thus began the group's engagement at the Friar's Inn, which lasted 17 months beginning in 1921. During this time the group performed as the Friar's Society Orchestra.

While at the Friar's Inn, the group attracted the interest not only of fans but of other musicians. The cornetist Bix Beiderbecke, who had been sent to school in Chicago by his parents in the hopes of removing him from jazz influences, regularly attended their shows and was often allowed to perform with the band.

The group recorded a series of records for Gennett Records in 1922 and 1923. On July 17 and 18 1923, they were joined by the pianist and composer Jelly Roll Morton. These sessions with Morton have sometimes been incorrectly called the first mixed-race recording session; while they are noteworthy, early examples, there were earlier instances such as the 1919 Gennett and Okeh recording of Creole clarinetists Achille Bauquet in Jimmy Durante's New Orleans Jazz Band.

After their engagement at the Friar's Inn ended, the New Orleans Rhythm Kings were largely scattered and disorganized. They re-formed periodically to make recordings, with significant member turnover (Roppolo and Mares were more or less the leaders and constants of the group), but the group never played all together again. They went their separate ways: Paul Mares continued to play music, releasing a record in 1935 and ran the P&M New Orleans Barbeque with his wife in the late 1930s. Leon Roppolo was (and always had been) mentally unstable, and he spent the last years of his life in and out of institutions until his early death in 1943, though he managed to keep playing music as best he could. Most of the other members of the NORK also kept successful musical careers after the group dissolved.

== Recordings ==
Panama
A 1922 recording by the band

In 1922 the group released the first of several records for Gennett Records, who were located in Richmond, Indiana. Gennett's studio was next to a railroad track, which was cursed by many frustrated musicians whose recording sessions were disturbed by the rattling trains. In the first session at Gennett, the Friars Society Orchestra (the name under which the recording was released) recorded eight songs: "Panama", "Tiger Rag", and "Livery Stable Blues", representing the New Orleans jazz standbys; the original compositions " Oriental", "Discontented Blues", and "Farewell Blues"; and a never-released Original Dixieland Jazz Band song, "Eccentric".

Paul Mares scheduled another two-day recording session at Gennett later, but the band had recently dissolved somewhat, moving in different directions following their stint at the Friar's Inn. For the session Mares got Brunies, Roppolo, Stitzel, and Pollack together to release a record as the New Orleans Rhythm Kings, the first time the name had been used, since it had referred to Bee Palmer's travelling vaudeville act.

The group's recordings demonstrate a more serious, crafted style than that of the then-famous Original Dixieland Jazz Band (ODJB). While the ODJB advertised their music as a novelty act, the NORK sought to distance themselves from the popular image of jazz as a novelty and instead marketed it as a genuine musical genre.

The third recording session occurred after Mares and Roppolo had spent some time playing in a small band in New York City. They returned to Chicago and scheduled another session with Gennett Records as the New Orleans Rhythm Kings. This session is notable because of the participation of Jelly Roll Morton. Morton was a Creole from New Orleans, and though he identified strongly with the white "French" side of being Creole, he was generally viewed by society as black (though he was fairly light-skinned and could sometimes "pass" as Latin-American), and therefore was subjected to many of the same social pressures as other blacks of the day. In 1923 the country was still largely racially segregated, as were jazz bands. White bands were beginning to spring up attempting to imitate the "hot" jazz style that the black musicians played, but rarely did any racial mixing occur in a professional setting (although in a non-professional setting, it was becoming more and more common). Jelly Roll Morton's participation in recording with the all white New Orleans Rhythm Kings was history in the making: it is an early example of mixed race recordings.

Mares and Roppolo went on to conduct two more recording sessions in New Orleans as the New Orleans Rhythm Kings in 1925 before the group dissolved altogether and its members went their separate ways.

=== Record reissues ===
A significant period of time after NORK disbanded, several record labels began reissuing the band's material. The first revival was by Riverside Records, which reissued NORK's Gennett recordings. The second reissue was from Milestone Records. Both of these reissues were important in keeping NORK's music commercially available and boosting their visibility to critics and historians. In the 1990s Milestone released the band's Gennett sides on compact disc. Six of the first eight recordings for Gennett under the Friars Society Orchestra name are on disk A of the four-CD Gennett Jazz set issued by JSP Records (JSP926). In 2019 Rivermont Records released a two-CD set featuring new transfers by Doug Benson. Using newly developed restoration technology, Benson stabilized the intermittent speed fluctuations that affected records from the band's 1922 session as Friar's Society Orchestra.

Compositions and arrangements by the New Orleans Rhythm Kings continue to be played by "traditional jazz" or Dixieland bands all over the world today. Some of their famous compositions and contributions to the jazz repertory include "Bugle Call Rag", "Milenburg Joys", "Farewell Blues", "Angry", "Baby", "Discontented Blues", "She's Crying for Me", "Oriental", "I Never Knew What a Girl Could Do", "Everybody Loves Somebody Blues", and "Tin Roof Blues".

"Make Love to Me", a 1954 pop song by Jo Stafford, using the New Orleans Rhythm King's music from the 1923 jazz standard "Tin Roof Blues", became a number 1 hit. Anne Murray and B. B. King also recorded "Make Love to Me".

=== NORK sound ===
The ODJB and the NORK were the two leading white bands of the day, but their musical styles were very different. As opposed to the short, choppy style of the ODJB, NORK played more legato pieces. Leon Roppolo's clarinet sound gave the band its characteristic, bluesy feel.

Richard M. Sudhalter, in his book Lost Chords: White Musicians and Their Contributions to Jazz, wrote that "Three takes of 'Tin Roof Blues' exist, three opportunities to listen to Roppolo's mind at work, arranging and rearranging the pieces of his elegiac little statement. He begins all three on his high G (concert F), ends all three on the same two-bar resolution. But the differences in between, matters of tone, dynamics, and shading as much as specific notes, are spellbinding.

"This solo, in each of its three variants, contains many 'bent' notes, the exact pitches of which resist attempts at formal notation. In certain cases…. a sustained note will have both a 'sharp' sign and a 'flat' sign above it, indicating a progression from one pitch variation to the other, in the order given."

Earlier in the same chapter, Sudhalter described the full band's sound in their first Gennett recordings:

"The notion of tunefulness implies particular attention to the aesthetics of sound. The tutti passages on 'Farewell Blues', with their echoes of railroad whistles, the carefully arranged interludes and fadeout ending on Schoebel's unusual 'Discontented Blues', bespeak rehearsal and behind-the-scenes work aimed at achieving a polished and varied band sound. Nothing on any record by a black band of the early '20s is anywhere near as aesthetically venturesome."

== Race and cultural context ==
At its roots, New Orleans jazz (which influenced Chicago jazz) represented an assimilation of Southern black traditions carried over from their African heritage mixed with white European traditions. The instrumentation was European (trumpets, trombones, etc.), while the melodic ideas and unconventional (at least, in the context of classical music) rhythms and musical forms were born from the ring shouts and country blues styles of black slaves. The first jazz bands were mostly black and played for black audiences, though the genre progressively got picked up by white audiences. Many of the musicians were unable to read music but instead relied heavily on head arrangements (learning the arrangement by ear and then committing it to memory) and an ability to improvise. In many other cases the musicians could read music, but white audiences were so captivated by the improvisational ability, that they were convinced was inherent in black musicians, that the musicians would memorize the arrangement beforehand and appear to improvise to cater to the expectations of white audiences.

The New Orleans Rhythm Kings represents a contingent of white jazz bands that emerged from 1915 to the early 1920s. These bands, perhaps the best-known of which was the Original Dixieland Jazz Band, attempted to imitate the fast virtuosic style of their black counterparts. "The relatively small inner circles of acute jazz listeners in the 1920s recognized that black musicians played better, more mature, and more confident jazz".

Despite a significant bias that only black musicians could play "real" jazz, white bands such as the New Orleans Rhythm Kings and the Original Dixieland Jazz Band emerged and were successful, especially in their recordings. "Livery Stable Blues" recorded by the ODJB in 1917 personified the vaudevillian style that white audiences sought in jazz: choppy, comedic, almost poking fun at itself with its animal sounds.

The New Orleans Rhythm Kings, however, brought a new flavor to recorded jazz. NORK and ODJB were not the first white jazz bands (there were many others that played around Chicago and New Orleans), but they were some of the first to make recordings, and the New Orleans Rhythm Kings was one of the first white jazz bands to make mixed-race recordings (with Jelly Roll Morton, a creole).

== Members ==
=== New Orleans contingent ===
- "Chink" Martin Abraham, string bass, tuba
- Leo Adde, drums
- Lester Bouchon, saxophone
- Steve Brown, string bass
- George Brunies, trombone
- Charlie Cordilla, clarinet, saxophone
- Bill Eastwood, banjo
- Emmett Hardy, cornet
- Arthur "Monk" Hazel, drums
- Glyn Lea "Red" Long, piano
- Arnold "Deacon" Loyacano (Loiacono), string bass, piano
- Oscar Marcour, violin
- Paul Mares, trumpet, leader
- Santo Pecora, trombone
- Leon Roppolo, clarinet

=== Chicago contingent ===
- Louis 'Lou' Black, banjo
- Voltaire de Faut, clarinet, saxophone
- Bob Gillette, banjo
- Husk O'Hare, promoter
- Don Murray, clarinet, saxophone
- Bee Palmer, vocalist
- Jack Pettis, saxophone
- Kyle Pierce, piano
- Ben Pollack, drums
- Elmer Schoebel, piano, arranger
- Glen Scoville, saxophone
- Frank Snyder, drums
- Mel Stizel, piano
