= George Brunies =

American jazz trombonist (1902–1974)

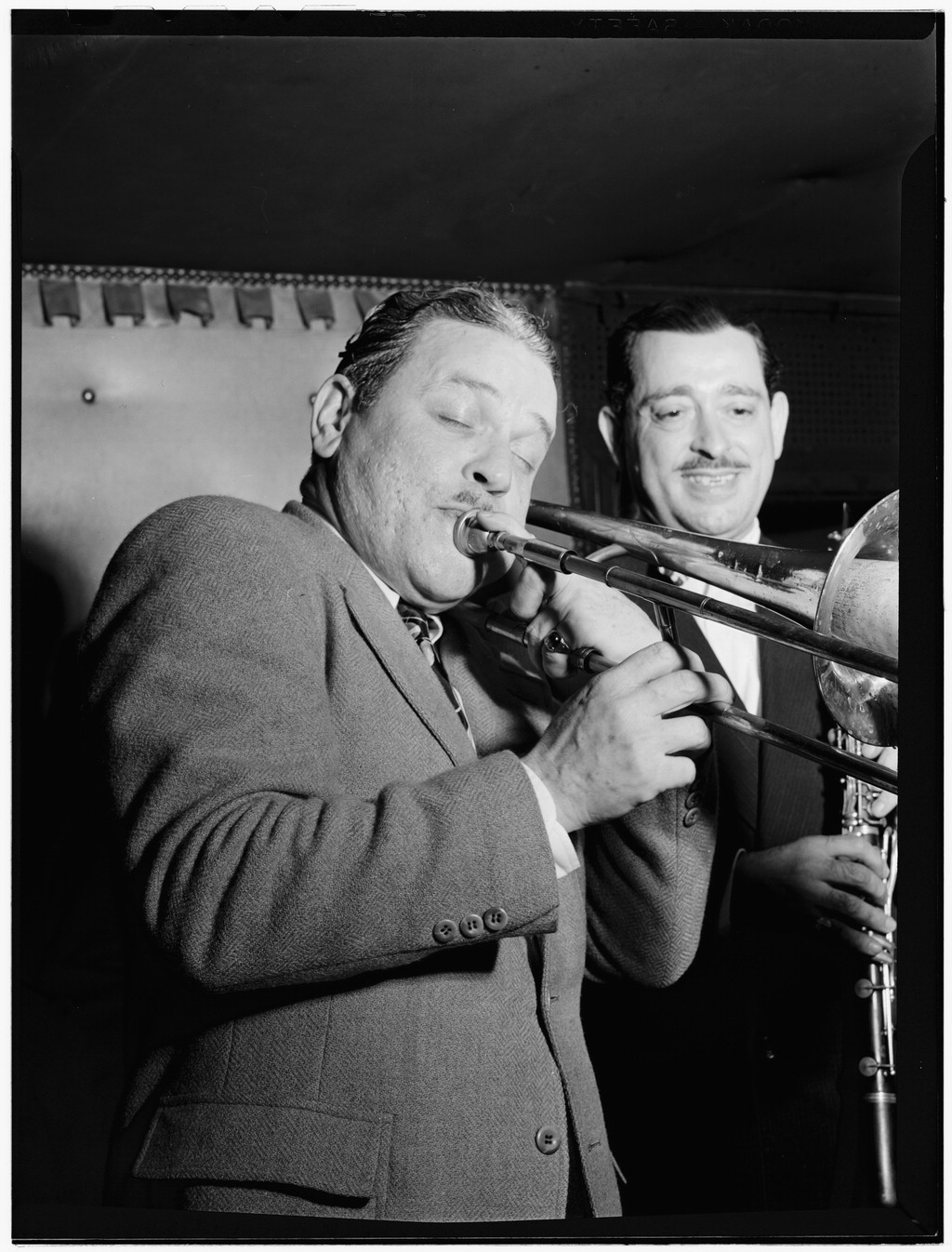
- George Brunis and Tony Parenti, Jimmy Ryan's (Club), New York, c. August 1946, image: Gottlieb

Background information
- Also known as: Georg Brunis
- Born: George Clarence Brunies; February 6, 1902; New Orleans, Louisiana, U.S.
- Died: November 19, 1974 (aged 72) Chicago, Illinois, U.S.
- Genres: Jazz, dixieland
- Occupation: Musician
- Instrument: Trombone
- Years active: 1920–1960

George Clarence Brunies (February 6, 1902 – November 19, 1974), a.k.a. Georg Brunis, was an American jazz trombonist, who was part of the dixieland revival. He was known as "The King of the Tailgate Trombone".

== Background ==
Brunies was born in New Orleans, Louisiana, United States, into a musical family. His father led a family band, and his brothers Henry, Merritt, Richard, and Albert ("Abbie") all became noted professional musicians. By the age of eight, George was already playing alto horn professionally in Papa Jack Laine's band. A few years later he switched to trombone. He played with many jazz, dance, and parade bands in New Orleans. He never learned to read music, but could quickly pick up tunes and invent a part for his instrument.

He first went to Chicago in 1919 with a band led by Ragbaby Stevens, then worked on riverboats going up and down the Mississippi River. In 1921, he returned to Chicago, and joined a band of his New Orleans friends playing at the Friar's Inn; this was the band that became famous as the New Orleans Rhythm Kings. Brunies's trombone style was influential to the young Chicago players, and his records were much copied.

After the Rhythm Kings broke up in Chicago in 1924, Brunies joined the nationally famous Ted Lewis band, which he played with through 1934.

After some time with Louis Prima's band he landed a steady gig at the New York City jazz club, Nick's, through 1938. In 1939, he joined Muggsy Spanier's band, with whom he made some of his most famous recordings. The following year he returned to Nick's, where he remained until 1946. Brunies then worked with Eddie Condon.

== Later career ==
In 1949, Brunies moved back to Chicago to lead his own band. Brunies often showed off his unusual technical abilities and bizarre sense of humor at the same time; for example he would lie on the floor and invite the largest person in the audience to sit on his chest while he played trombone.

On the advice of a numerologist, he changed his name to Georg Brunis in the late 1940s, when he was playing at the 1111 (eleven-eleven) Club in Chicago. He believed that this name change would increase his good fortune. The 1111 was a popular jazz club which was always full on Friday and Saturday nights with jazz lovers from the northern suburbs of Chicago. Every now and then other well-known jazz musicians, such as Muggsy Spanier, would drop in and sit and play until dawn.

Georg Brunis died in Chicago on November 19, 1974.

== Sources ==
- Kernfeld, Barry Dean, and Stanley Sadie. "New Orleans Rhythm Kings." The New Grove Dictionary of Jazz. London: Macmillan, 1988.
- New Orleans Rhythm Kings biography. The Red Hot Jazz Archive. Retrieved June 29, 2006.
- Kennedy, Rick. Jelly Roll, Bix, and Hoagy: Gennett Studios and the Birth of Recorded Jazz. Bloomington: Indiana UP, 1994. ISBN 978-0253213150
- Kenney, William Howland. Chicago Jazz: A Cultural History, 1904-1930. New York: Oxford UP, 1993. ISBN 9780195092608
