= Paul Mares =

American jazz cornet and trumpet player (1900-1949)

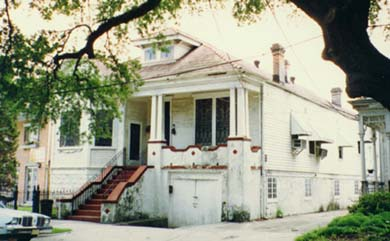
Mares' former house, near Esplanade Avenue & Broad

Paul Mares (June 15, 1900 – August 18, 1949), was an American early dixieland jazz cornet and trumpet player, and leader of the New Orleans Rhythm Kings.

Mares established himself as a respected bandleader over a group of wild and strong-willed musicians, as The New Orleans Rhythm Kings (N.O.R.K.) became one of the best-regarded bands in Chicago in the early 1920s.

In January 1935 Mares played trumpet on, and fronted, a recording session with a band called "Paul Mares and his Friars Society Orchestra" - a name that referred to the Friar's Inn club where the N.O.R.K. had first played in Chicago. The 1935 band included the white New Orleanian and N.O.R.K. veteran Santo Pecora on trombone, the black New Orleanian Omar Simeon on clarinet, and the Chicagoan altoist Boyce Brown, as well as George Wettling on drums, Jess Stacy on piano, Pat Pattison on bass, and Marvin Saxbe on guitar.
