= Leon Roppolo =

American jazz clarinetist (1902-1943)

Leon Joseph Roppolo (March 16, 1902 – October 5, 1943) was an American early jazz clarinetist, best known for his playing with the New Orleans Rhythm Kings. He also played saxophone and guitar.

== Life and career ==
Leon Roppolo (nicknamed "Rap" and sometimes misspelled as "Rappolo") was born in Lutcher, Louisiana, United States, up-river from New Orleans. His family, of Sicilian origin, moved to the Uptown neighborhood of New Orleans about 1912.

At the age of fifteen he decided to leave home to travel with the band of Bee Palmer, which soon became the nucleus for the New Orleans Rhythm Kings. After the breakup of the Rhythm Kings in Chicago, Roppolo and Paul Mares headed east to try their luck on the New York City jazz scene. Contemporary musicians recalled Roppolo making some recordings with Original Memphis Five and California Ramblers musicians in New York in 1924; these sides were presumably unissued, or if issued unidentified.

Roppolo exhibited ever more eccentric behavior and violent temper. This was finally too much for his family to take, and Leon was committed to the state mental hospital in 1925. Roppolo died in New Orleans at the age of forty-one.

== Compositions ==
Roppolo's compositions include the jazz standards "Farewell Blues" and "Milenberg Joys", "Gold Leaf Strut" or "Golden Leaf Strut", "Tin Roof Blues" (1923), and "Make Love to Me".
