= Muskrat Ramble =

Song by Louis Armstrong and His Hot Five
- Written: 1926
- Genre: Jazz
- Composer: Kid Ory
- Lyricist: Ray Gilbert

"Muskrat Ramble" is a jazz composition written by Kid Ory in 1926. It was first recorded on February 26, 1926, by Louis Armstrong and his Hot Five, and became the group's most frequently recorded piece. It was paired on the flip side with another one of Armstrong's hits, "Heebie Jeebies." It was a prominent part of the Dixieland revival repertoire in the 1930s and 1940s, and was recorded by Bob Crosby, Roy Eldridge, Lionel Hampton, Woody Herman, Muggsy Spanier, Chet Atkins, Lu Watters, the Andrews Sisters, Harry James, and Al Hirt, among others. It is considered a part of the jazz standard repertoire.

Without Ory's consent, lyrics were written for the instrumental tune in 1950 by Ray Gilbert. After Gilbert protested that he was entitled to share credit with Ory, the American Society of Composers, Authors and Publishers awarded him one-third credit on all performances of "Muskrat Ramble", vocal and instrumental.

== History ==
Kid Ory said that he originally composed the tune "Muskrat Ramble" in 1921, and that the title was made up by Lil Hardin at the 1926 session when it was first recorded by Louis Armstrong and his Hot Five. Armstrong, on the other hand, claimed in an interview to have written the tune himself, and that it was Ory who only named it. Thomas Brothers has suggested that Armstrong wrote the first strain and that Ory wrote the second strain. Sidney Bechet has said that it was originally an old Buddy Bolden tune called "The Old Cow Died and the Old Man Cried".

Owing to a misprint, or the record company's sensibilities, the tune was titled "Muskat Ramble" on its initial release.

The tune contains a 32-bar ensemble section at the beginning, followed by 16-bar solo sections for the trombone, cornet and clarinet. After the solos, an ensemble section of 32 bars is played, followed by a two-bar trombone tag. Ory's tag at the end is almost always copied in performances. In the ensemble sections, the clarinet, cornet and trombone play a three-part counterpoint line typical of 1920s New Orleans bands.

== Notable recordings ==
- Louis Armstrong and His Hot Five
  Okeh 8300B
  Recorded February 26, 1926, in Chicago, Illinois
  Louis Armstrong (cornet), Johnny Dodds (clarinet), Lil Hardin (piano), Kid Ory (trombone), Johnny St. Cyr (banjo)
- Lu Watters' Yerba Buena Jazz Band
  Jazz Man 3
  Recorded December 19–20, 1941, in San Francisco, California
  Lu Watters (cornet), Russ Bennett (banjo), Bill Dart (drums), Ellis Horne (clarinet), Clancy Hayes (banjo), Dick Lammi (tuba), Turk Murphy (trombone), Wally Rose (piano), Bob Scobey (trumpet)
- Phil Harris and his Dixieland Syncopators
  RCA Victor 20-3273
  EMI, His Master's VoiceB 9927 (UK)
  Recorded February 24, 1950, in Hollywood, California
  Vocal refrain by Phil Harris, lyrics by Ray Gilbert
- The Big Chief Jazzband
  His Master's Voice A.L. 3371
  Recorded January 8, 1954, in Oslo, Norway
- The McGuire Sisters released a version, which was a hit single in 1954, reaching No. 11 on Billboard's chart of "Best Sellers in Stores", No. 10 on Billboard's chart of "Most Played in Juke Boxes", and No. 16 on Billboard's chart of "Most Played by Jockeys".
- Bing Crosby and Louis Armstrong for their album Bing & Satchmo (1960)

Singer Freddy Cannon had a pop version that went to #54 on Billboard's Top 100 in 1961

== Royalties and rights ==
Sometime in 1947, after working with Ory on the soundtrack for the RKO film Crossfire, clarinetist Barney Bigard asked him, "How much royalties do you get out of 'Muskrat Ramble'?"

I don't even know why I asked. I guess more out of conversation than curiosity. "I don't get nothing," came his reply and I almost fell off the chair. He said he never sold it to anyone since he had composed it that day for the Louis Armstrong Hot Five recording. That was some twenty years before and it had become one of the all-time dixieland hits in the meantime.

Ory said that his publisher, the Melrose Publishing Company, had sold the song to another company and he had never received "nickel one". Through friends in the music publishing business Bigard identified the current publisher of "Muskrat Ramble", and he took Ory to their offices. Bigard described the exchange in his autobiography:

We waited a few minutes and in we went. "Hello, Mr. Levy," I said. "I'd like to introduce you to a man who composed a tune that you publish and gets played all the time. This is Edward 'Kid' Ory, and he has never gotten a dime in royalties." … They must have looked high and low for him all right. All they had to do was look in the union book.

Ory received a check for around $8,000 on the spot, and royalties of about $600 every quarter thereafter. "That started him buying his new home," said Bigard, who noted a change in Ory from then on. "At first it was nothing big, but do you know that he never thanked me for getting straight with his royalties. Never said a word. Maybe success was having something to do with it. … I didn't stay around till the end, but he was making a lot of enemies. He just was a different guy than I had known and helped — been glad to help, in fact."

=== ASCAP decree ===
Ray Gilbert wrote lyrics to the originally instrumental tune in 1950. In 1951 Gilbert protested to the American Society of Composers, Authors and Publishers that his lyric — written without Ory's permission — added value to the tune and entitled him to share equal credit with Ory. ASCAP's Classification Committee decreed in 1956 that Gilbert was entitled to a third of all performance credits of "Muskrat Ramble", both vocal and instrumental, retroactive to 1950.

"In spite of ASCAP's disavowal of setting a precedent," wrote Billboard magazine, "the decision is regarded as likely to spark similar protests on the part of other lyricists who have added words to established instrumentals in the past. It also raises something of a moral issue in that the trade is wondering if the decision bespeaks ASCAP's approval of publishers adding lyrics to an instrumental work without the consent of the composer."

=== Ory vs. McDonald ===
Babette Ory, Kid Ory's daughter from his second marriage and heir to the "Muskrat Ramble" copyright, sued Country Joe McDonald for copyright infringement in 2001. The complaint alleged that the tune for McDonald's signature song "I Feel Like I'm Fixin' to Die Rag"—specifically the chorus that begins, "And it's one, two, three, what are we fighting for?"—was lifted in part from "Muskrat Ramble". The song was famously performed by Country Joe and the Fish at Woodstock in 1969. This suit was dismissed due to the lateness of the filing. Since decades had already passed from the time McDonald composed his song in 1965, Ory based her suit on a new version of it recorded by McDonald in 1999. Judge Nora Manella, then of the United States District Court for the Central District of California, upheld McDonald's laches defense, noting that Ory and her father were aware of the original version of the song, with the same questionable section, for some three decades without bringing a suit. This ruling was upheld by the United States Court of Appeals for the Ninth Circuit in 2005, and Ory was also ordered to pay McDonald's substantial attorneys' fees.

== See also ==
- List of 1920s jazz standards
- Muskrat Love
