= Castle Jazz Band =

US jazz band

The Castle Jazz Band was a Dixieland jazz band, part of the "West Coast revival" of traditional jazz music. Their recordings were popular worldwide for a time, although touring outside their Portland, Oregon base was limited.

== History ==
The Castle Jazz Band started in 1943, part of a West Coast revival of traditional jazz that rebelled against modern jazz. It was named after "The Castle", a roadhouse tavern south of Portland (although at the time the group worked there they were simply called "Monte Ballou and his Orchestra").

The band's roots began earlier, in 1940, with a band led by trumpeter Dick Sheuerman. He assembled a five-piece band with Bill Pavia on clarinet, George Phillips on trombone, Al Puderbaugh on piano, and Axel Tyle on drums. The group played at the Hi-Hat Club in downtown Portland until late 1941. During the run there, guitarist/vocalist Monte Ballou sat in frequently. At the time he was a headliner at the popular Clover Club in downtown Portland. In 1943, he reassembled the Hi-Hat group and began playing Saturdays at The Castle.

The band was a cooperative venture that never paid its members. It was led by banjoist Monte Ballou. Their first recordings took place March 28 and April 16, 1944, and the first issue (At the Jazz Band Ball/Ostrich Walk, Castle Records 1) was limited to 200 copies. A second issue (At the Jazz Band Ball/Sister Kate) was limited to 100 copies, and trumpeter Bob Scobey of San Francisco's Lu Watters Yerba Buena Jazz Band substituted for cornetist Ned Dotson. Wartime and employment difficulties ensured the band would not record again until December 29, 1947 (At a Georgia Camp Meeting/Ory's Creole Trombone, Castle Records 2), but this recording was more widely distributed and garnered the national and international attention of jazz fans and received critical acclaim. Ballou changed from guitar to banjo for the 1947 recording, and this, plus a change from string bass to tuba, had a significant effect on the band's sound. The most famous lineup was formed in 1948, and played at the Jantzen Beach Amusement Park in Portland, dressed in various costumes. They became regulars at the Rathskeller Club in 1948, and then moved to a more upscale location, the Sportsman Club, where they were a draw not only locally, but also from the traditional jazz fanbase in San Francisco. Their heyday was from 1949 to 1951. This time period included being a featured group at the 1949 Dixieland Jubilee concert (where they were recorded by Decca Records playing "High Society"), and 13 more 78 RPM recordings on the Castle Records label. Trumpet player Don Kinch claimed one of these records, Floating Down the Old Green River, sold more than a million copies. George Bruns left in 1950 to join the Turk Murphy band, and was replaced initially by George Phillips (who had worked and recorded in the earlier edition of the band), and then by Rod Levitt.

Levitt was considered too modern for the band and found it difficult to fit in. The cooperative band broke up in 1951, and Ballou formed a new version of the band that performed in a club he bought called the Diamond Horseshoe, in good part due to the success of the Castle Records releases. Ballou sold the club in 1954 and disbanded in order to briefly join forces with Doc Evans.

After his time with Evans Ballou reformed the group and continued to work various venues in the Portland area in addition to private engagements. Members of the 1949–50 band were reassembled in the late 1950s to make two LPs for the Good Time Jazz Records label (reissued on CD). In the early 1960s, Ballou led the band for a steady engagement in the Roaring 20s club in Harvey Dick's Hoyt Hotel, but when that ended in 1966 Ballou found it difficult to find another steady engagement. He continued to perform sporadically in the Portland area, often as a single act as he had done in his younger days. Periodically he would assemble a six or seven piece for concerts and recordings, including sessions in 1968 and 1972.

== Style ==
The Castle Jazz Band was an all-white traditional jazz ensemble. It was composed of top-notch musicians who considered themselves neo-traditionalists; as such they rejected big band music as over-arranged and bebop as the domain of "drug-addicted crackpots". The Castle Jazz Band stuck to what they considered the roots of jazz, with an instrumentation consisting of trumpet, clarinet, trombone, tuba, drums, banjo and piano. They aimed to emulate the music of Jelly Roll Morton and King Oliver. The band was reviewed as "rousing" and having the ability to impart "fire" to "cornier" numbers. Of importance to the band's success was the "rhythm and enthusiasm" of Ballou, and Kinch's trumpet which could evoke Bix Beiderbecke. Also important was the "hell of a good time" the band was able to communicate. Individual solos were limited in the Castle band, with Ballou preferring an ensemble style. They were considered to be a "superior, authentic, two-beat" band. The band was well-rehearsed, but did not come off as overly polished. Of greatest importance was blending of the ensemble work, or as Kinch put it, "It's your sound that matters."

== Impact ==
During its heyday the Castle Jazz Band was Portland's most popular jazz group, both locally and internationally. In the late 1940s, they were among four groups which were leading the traditional jazz movement on the West coast. George Avakian stated that the band made Oregon "a better place to live" and considered them the acme of semi-professional jazz groups at the time (even though several members of the band, including Ballou, were full-time musicians).

== Castle Records ==
Castle 8, When the Saints Go Marching In

Castle Records was founded by Harry Fosbury to release the band's records. The label's first issues were primitive sounding, but as recording engineer Fosbury continued, the sound quality improved. In addition to the Castle Jazz Band, Castle Records also released four piano solos by Lee Stafford. The recordings for the label took place between 1944 and 1950, Castle Records 15 being the last 78 rpm issue.

== Personnel ==
- Monte Ballou, banjo, guitar, vocals (1944–1954, 1957–1977)
- George Bruns, trombone (1947–1949)
- Don Kinch, cornet/trumpet (1947–1950, 1958)
- Freddie Crews, piano (1951–1954)
- Larry DuFresne, piano (1947–1950)
- Bob Gilbert, clarinet (1948–1954)
- Bob Johnson, piano (1944)
- Rod Levitt, trombone
- George Phillips, trombone (1944, 1949–1950)
- Hiram "Hi" Gates, trombone (1951–1952)
- Nathanial "Ned" Dotson, cornet (1944, 1950–1952)
- Bill "Willie" Pavia, clarinet (1944–1947)
- Bob Short, tuba (1947–1954)
- Axel Tyle, drums (1944–1948)
- Homer Welch, drums (1949–1950)
- Bob Chester, drums (1951–1953)
- Edwin Fountaine Sr., Bass (1966–1977)
- Ernie Carson, trumpet (1954–1956)
