= Chris Tyle =

American jazz musician

Chris Tyle (born May 1955) is dixieland jazz musician who performs on cornet, trumpet, clarinet and drums.

== Career ==
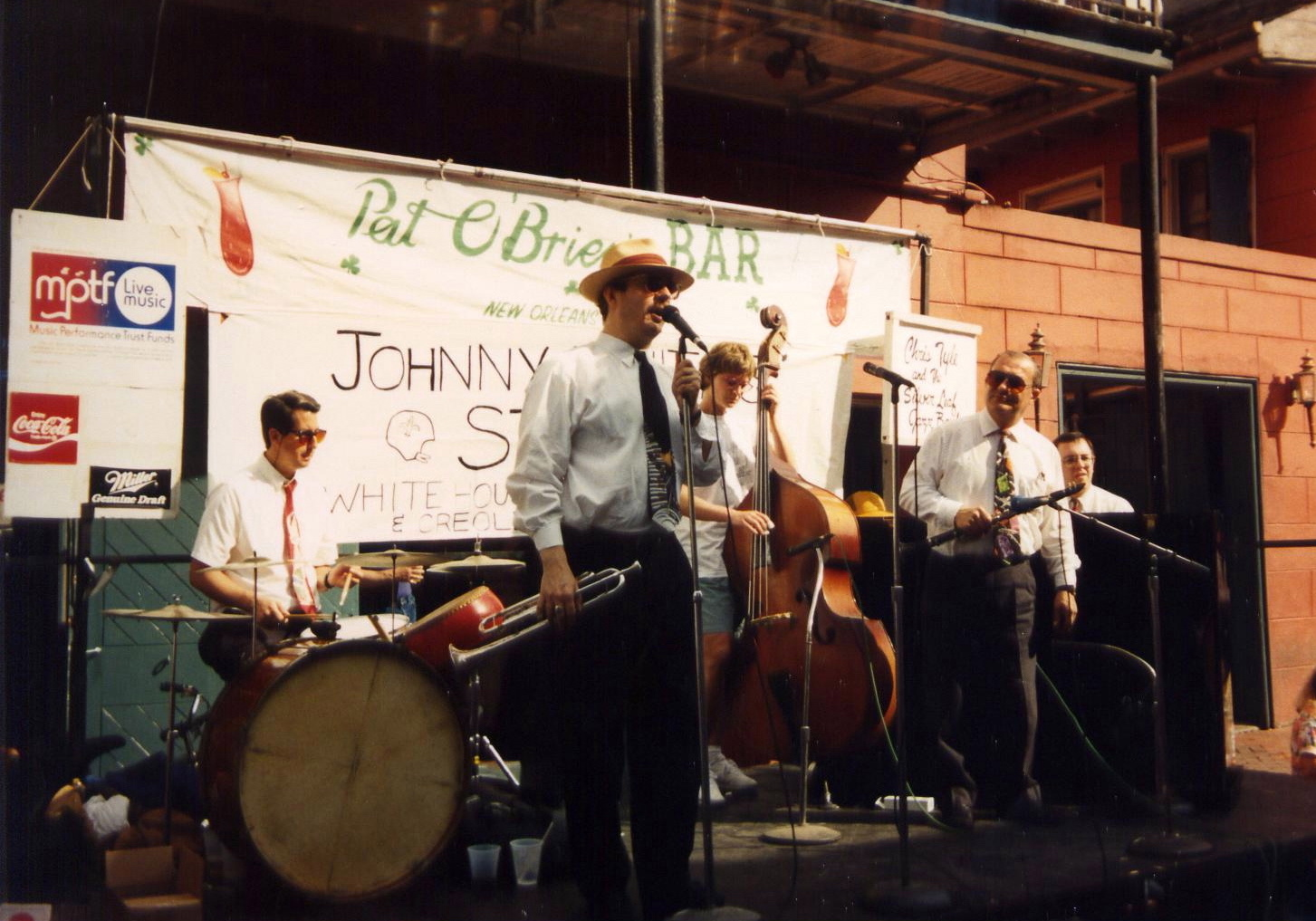
Chris Tyle (at microphone with trumpet) leading a combo in the French Quarter, 1993

Tyle grew up in a musical family. His father, Axel Tyle (1912–1981), was a jazz drummer and member of the Portland, Oregon-based Castle Jazz Band.

Tyle's first musical job was with Don Kinch's Conductors Ragtime (1976–1979). Kinch (1917–2011), played with Axel Tyle in the Castle Jazz Band in the late 1940s, and went on to work with the Turk Murphy Jazz Band and the Firehouse Five Plus Two.

In 1979 Tyle played and recorded with the Turk Murphy Jazz Band in San Francisco, then returned to Portland to form a swing music band named Wholly Cats (named after a number written and recorded by Benny Goodman and Count Basie). The band was a popular fixture on the Portland scene from 1979–1984, releasing an album in 1982. After disbanding the group's vocalist and guitarist, Rebecca "Becky" Kilgore, went on to become a popular freelance artist and has made many recordings and festival appearances.

Tyle moved to New Orleans in 1989, immediately becoming an in-demand performer with a number of groups, including Steve Pistorius's Mahogany Hall Stompers, Jacques Gauthe's Creole Rice Jazz Band, and John Gill's Dixieland Serenaders . He also worked with jazz greats Danny Barker (guitar) and Albert "Pud" Brown (clarinet/sax). In 1992 Tyle formed the Silver Leaf Jazz Band which worked six nights-a-week at the Royal Sonesta Hotel on Bourbon Street.

In 2002 Tyle returned to the Pacific Northwest to pursue a freelance career. Up until 2015 he performed regularly with the Titanic Jazz Band of Los Angeles, Combo DeLuxe of Seattle/Tacoma, and "subbed" with Bob Schulz' Frisco Jazz Band of San Francisco and other West Coast traditional jazz bands. He also has frequently performed in Europe, most notably with the Gambit Jazzmen of England.

In 2006 he became a member of the orchestra for the musical A la Recherche de Joséphine (Looking for Josephine), directed and written by Jérôme Savary, and starring Nicolle Rochelle. The show ran for six months in 2006-2007 at the Opéra-Comique in Paris, France, and has subsequently toured in France, performed in Vienna, the United States, and Lebanon.

Tyle has made over 70 recordings with a variety of groups, including eight with his Silver Leaf Jazz Band. A song from his Silver Leaf Jazz Band album The Smiler (Stomp Off) was used in the PBS documentary Jazz. Another Silver Leaf Jazz Band album, New Orleans Wiggle (Jazzology), received the highest rating in the Penguin Guide to Jazz on CD 2003, one of only ten recordings in the book to receive this rating.

In addition to musical performance, Tyle is a writer and educator. He has written many articles and is a contributor to Jazz Standards. He is a member of the International Association of Jazz Educators and the Jazz Journalists Association.

Tyle moved to France in October 2015 and retired from full-time performance, due in part to a medical condition known as essential tremor which is exacerbated in performance situations. He continues to play clarinet with the New Orleans Jazz Trio.

== Selected discography ==
Chris Tyle's Silver Leaf Jazz Band of New Orleans

- Streets and Scenes of New Orleans (Good Time Jazz/Concord)
- Jelly's Best Jam (Good Time Jazz/Concord)
- Great Composers of New Orleans Jazz (Good Time Jazz /Concord)
- New Orleans Wiggle (Jazzology)
- The Smiler (Stomp Off)
- Sugar Blues (Stomp Off)

Turk Murphy Jazz Band

- A Natural High – Turk Murphy Jazz Band (Bainbridge)
