= Burt Bales =

American musician

Burton Franklin Bales (April 20, 1916, in Stevensville, Montana – October 26, 1989, in San Francisco) was an American jazz stride pianist.

Bales began to play piano at age twelve, and played in hotels and nightclubs in California in the 1930s. He played regularly in San Francisco in the 1940s, with Lu Watters's Yerba Buena Jazz Band, but was drafted in 1943 and only recorded with that group on one brief session with Bunk Johnson. He was discharged for myopia and led his own band from 1943 to 1946 before taking an extended residency at San Francisco's 1018 Club. He played with Turk Murphy (1949–50), Bob Scobey, and Marty Marsala, then played mostly solo between 1954 and 1966; one of his regular gigs was at Pier 23. He recorded extensively for Good Time Jazz, Arhoolie, ABC-Paramount, and Euphonic.

== Military service ==
Bales enlisted in the United States army on January 23, 1943.
