= List of jazz musicians =

This is a list of jazz musicians by instrument based on existing articles on Wikipedia. Do not enter names that lack articles. Do not enter names that lack sources.

== Accordion ==
- Kamil Běhounek (1916–1983)
- Luciano Biondini (born 1971)
- Asmund Bjørken (1933–2018)
- Stian Carstensen (born 1971)
- Gabriel Fliflet (born 1958)
- Richard Galliano (born 1950)
- Tommy Gumina (1931–2013)
- Frode Haltli (born 1975)
- Pete Jolly (1932–2004)
- Guy Klucevsek (1947–2025)
- Nisse Lind (1904–1941)
- Frank Marocco (1931–2012)
- Mat Mathews (1924–2009)
- Joe Mooney (1911–1975)
- Eivin One Pedersen (1956–2012)
- Leon Sash (1922–1979)
- George Shearing (1919–2011)
- Art Van Damme (1920–2010)

== Bass guitar ==
- Victor Bailey (1960–2016)
- Brian Bromberg (born 1960)
- Stanley Clarke (born 1951)
- Bob Cranshaw (1932–2016)
- Mark Egan (born 1951)
- Alphonso Johnson (born 1951)
- Bill Laswell (born 1955)
- Marcus Miller (born 1959)
- Monk Montgomery (1921–1982)
- Jaco Pastorius (1951–1987)
- John Patitucci (born 1959)
- Steve Swallow (born 1940)
- Jamaaladeen Tacuma (born 1956)
- Gerald Veasley (born 1955)
- Eberhard Weber (born 1940)

== Bassoon ==
- Garvin Bushell (1902–1991)
- Karen Borca (born 1948)
- Yusef Lateef (1920–2013)
- Illinois Jacquet (1922–2014)
- Makanda Ken McIntyre (1931–2001)
- Frank Tiberi (born 1928)
- Frankie Trumbauer (1901–1956)

== Cello ==
- Harry Babasin (1921–1988)
- Ron Carter (born 1937)
- David Darling (1941–2021)
- Richard Davis (born 1930)
- David Eyges (born 1950)
- Nathan Gershman (1917–2008)
- Dave Holland (born 1946)
- Tristan Honsinger (born 1949)
- Sam Jones (1924–1981)
- Fred Katz (1919–2013)
- Diedre Murray (born 1951)
- Oscar Pettiford (1922–1960)
- Hank Roberts (born 1954)
- Abdul Wadud (1947–2022)
- Doug Watkins (1934–1962)
- Eberhard Weber (born 1940)
- Laufey Lin (born 1999)

== Clarinet ==
- Woody Allen (born 1935)
- Craig Ball
- Barney Bigard (1906–1980)
- Don Burrows (1928–2020)
- Don Byron (born 1958)
- Evan Christopher (born 1969)
- Anat Cohen (born 1975)
- Eddie Daniels (born 1941)
- Kenny Davern (1935–2006)
- Buddy DeFranco (1923–2014)
- Johnny Dodds (1892–1940)
- Irving Fazola (1912–1949)
- Pete Fountain (1930–2016)
- Victor Goines (born 1961)
- Benny Goodman (1909–1986)
- Edmond Hall (1901–1967)
- Jimmy Hamilton (1917–1994)
- Woody Herman (1913–1987)
- Peanuts Hucko (1918–2003)
- Michael Marcus (born 1952)
- Joe Muranyi (1928–2012)
- Jimmie Noone (1895–1944)
- Ken Peplowski (1959–2026)
- Sid Phillips (1902–1973)
- Russell Procope (1908–1981)
- Pee Wee Russell (1906–1969)
- Tony Scott (1921–2007)
- Artie Shaw (1910–2004)
- Bill Smith (1926–2020)
- Putte Wickman (1924–2006)
- Lester Young (1909–1959)

== Cornet ==
- Nat Adderley (1931–2000)
- Louis Armstrong (1901–1971)
- Bix Beiderbecke (1903–1931)
- Buddy Bolden (1877–1931)
- Bobby Hackett (1915–1976)
- Jeff Hughes
- Freddie Keppard (1889–1933)
- Butch Morris (1947–2013)
- Red Nichols (1905–1965)
- Rex Stewart (1907–1967)
- Chris Tyle (born 1955)
- Steamboat Willie (born c. 1950)

== Flugelhorn ==
- Joe Bishop (1907–1976)
- Miles Davis (1926–1991)
- Art Farmer (1928–1999)
- Freddie Hubbard (1938–2008)
- Thad Jones (1923–1986)
- Chuck Mangione (1940–2025)
- Shorty Rogers (1924–1994)
- Clark Terry (1920–2015)
- Ack van Rooyen (1930–2021)
- Kenny Wheeler (1930–2014)

== Flute ==
- Greg Abate (born 1947)
- Jane Bunnett (born 1956)
- Wayman Carver (1905–1967)
- Buddy Collette (1921–2010)
- Eric Dolphy (1928–1964)
- Paul Horn (1930–2014)
- Bobby Jaspar (1926–1963)
- Rahsaan Roland Kirk (1935–1977)
- Moe Koffman (1928–2001)
- Byard Lancaster (1942–2012)
- Yusef Lateef (1920–2013)
- Hubert Laws (born 1939)
- Dave Liebman (born 1946)
- Charles Lloyd (born 1938)
- Herbie Mann (1930–2003)
- James Moody (1925–2010)
- Sam Most (1930–2013)
- Gerry Niewood (1943–2009)
- Jerome Richardson (1920–2000)
- Sam Rivers (1923–2011)
- Bruno Romani (born 1960)
- Bud Shank (1926–2009)
- Alberto Socarras (1908–1987)
- Les Spann (1932–1989)
- James Spaulding (born 1937)
- Jeremy Steig (1942–2016)
- Ira Sullivan (1931–2020)
- Lew Tabackin (born 1940)
- Henry Threadgill (born 1944)
- Dave Valentin (1952–2017)
- Frank Wess (1922–2013)

== French horn ==
- David Amram (born 1930)
- Vincent Chancey (born 1950)
- John Clark (born 1944)
- Junior Collins (1927–1976)
- Sharon Freeman
- John Graas (1917–1962)
- Pete Levin (born 1942)
- Willie Ruff (1931–2023)
- Gunther Schuller (1925–2015)
- Tom Varner (born 1957)
- Julius Watkins (1921–1977)

== Harmonica ==
- Larry Adler (1914–2001)
- William Galison (born 1958)
- Max Geldray (1916–2004)
- Howard Levy (born 1951)
- Grégoire Maret (born 1975)
- Eddie Shu (1918–1986)
- Toots Thielemans (1922–2016)
- Frédéric Yonnet (born 1973)

== Harp ==
- Dorothy Ashby (1932–1986)
- Alice Coltrane (1937–2007)
- Adele Girard (1913–1993)
- Corky Hale (born 1936)
- Deborah Henson-Conant (born 1953)
- Casper Reardon (1907–1941)
- Brandee Younger (born 1983)

== Miscellaneous ==
- Rufus Harley – bagpipes
- Edmond Hall – celesta
- Meade Lux Lewis – celesta
- Thelonious Monk – celesta
- Emmett Chapman – Chapman Stick
- Red McKenzie – comb
- Steve Turre – conch shells
- Anthony Braxton – contrabass clarinet
- Paul McCandless – oboe, English horn
- Tom Scott – lyricon
- David Grisman – mandolin
- Dave Samuels – marimba
- Hot Lips Page – mellophone
- Scott Robinson – ophicleide
- Pat Metheny – orchestrion
- Charlie Mariano – nadaswaram
- Alphonse Picou – piccolo
- Sidney Bechet – sarrusophone
- Collin Walcott – sitar
- Andy Narell – steel drums
- Django Bates – tenor horn
- Max Roach – timpani
- Cliff Edwards – ukulele
- Herbie Hancock – vocoder
- Freddie Moore – washboard

== Oboe ==
- Bob Cooper (1925–1993)
- Yusef Lateef (1920–2013)
- Paul McCandless (born 1947)
- Makanda Ken McIntyre (1931–2001)
- Don Redman (1900–1964)
- Andrew White (1942–2020)

== Tuba ==
- Bill Barber (1920–2007)
- Pete Briggs (1904–unknown)
- Don Butterfield (1923–2006)
- Red Callender (1916–1992)
- June Cole (1903–1960)
- Ray Draper (1940–1982)
- Ralph Escudero (1898–1970)
- Howard Johnson (1941–2021)
- Dick Lammi (1909–1969)
- Cyrus St. Clair (1890–1955)
- Bob Stewart (born 1945)
- Joe Tarto (1902–1986)
