= Artie Matthews =

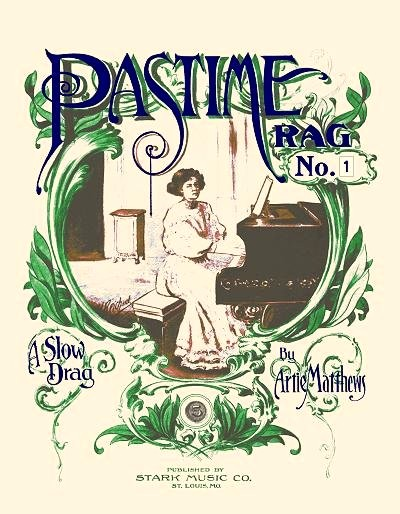
Pastime Rag, No.1 (1913)

Artie Matthews (November 15, 1888 – October 25, 1958) was an American songwriter, pianist, and ragtime composer.

Artie Matthews was born in Braidwood, Illinois; his family moved to Springfield, Illinois in his youth. He learned to play piano, mostly popular songs and light classics, until he heard ragtime played by a pianist named Banty Morgan about 1905. Matthews was fascinated and immersed himself in ragtime and started playing and writing numbers in the style. In 1908 he moved to the ragtime center of St. Louis, Missouri, which would be one of his bases, frequently alternating with Chicago, Illinois. He worked as a pianist, arranger, and wrote music for local theater productions.

In early 1913 music publisher John Stark heard Matthews and offered him 50 dollars each for any original rags he submitted for publication. Matthews also worked as an arranger for Starks.

In 1916 Artie Matthews moved to Cincinnati, Ohio, where he first worked as a church organist. In 1921 Matthews and his wife Anna Howard founded the Cosmopolitan School of Music, a music school for African Americans, where Matthews taught until his death. Among Matthews students was Frank Foster, who would become the principal arranger for the Count Basie orchestra. Singer Pinocchio James also attended the school.

Some rank Artie Matthews with Scott Joplin, Joseph Lamb, and James Scott as one of the finest and most sophisticated ragtime composers. His most famous rags are the "Pastime Rags", numbered 1 to 5, the latter of which was recorded in 1946 by Lu Watters and the Yerba Buena Jazz Band with Wally Rose on piano. His 1912 Baby Seals Blues was one of the first published Blues. His Weary Blues remains a standard in Dixieland and New Orleans jazz bands.

== See also ==
- List of ragtime composers
