= Dick Lammi =

American jazz musician (1909–1969)

Dick Lammi (January 15, 1909 – November 29, 1969) was an American jazz tubist and bassist associated with Dixieland jazz.

Lammi played violin and banjo early in his career, and played as a banjoist in various groups in the Pacific Northwest in the late 1920s. He settled in Portland, Oregon in the early 1930s, and played bass in a group there; after a move to San Francisco in 1936, he began playing tuba alongside bass. His best-known work was as a member of Lu Watters's band, the Yerba Buena Jazz Band. Lammi played in the ensemble from 1941 to 1950, including on virtually all of their recordings.

In the 1950s, Lammi worked with Bob Scobey, Turk Murphy, Wally Rose, and Clancy Hayes. He recorded little after the early 1960s, and his exact date of death is disputed.

== Discography ==
With Turk Murphy

- The Music of Jelly Roll Morton (Columbia, 1954)
- When the Saints Go Marching In (Columbia, 1954)
- Barrelhouse Jazz (Columbia, 1955)
- New Orleans Jazz Festival (Columbia, 1956)
- New Orleans Shuffle (Columbia, 1957)
- George Lewis & Turk Murphy at Newport (Verve, 1957)

With others

- Clancy Hayes, Clancy Hayes Sings (Verve, 1957)
- Lu Watters, Live from the Dawn Club (Fairmont, 1973)
- Lu Watters, Live at Hambone Kelly's (G.H.B., 1994)
