= George Probert =

American jazz musician (1927–2015)

- Born: George Arthur Probert, Jr. March 5, 1927; Los Angeles, California, United States
- Died: January 10, 2015 (aged 87) Monrovia, California, United States
- Genres: Jazz
- Occupations: Instrumentalist, bandleader
- Instruments: Clarinet, soprano saxophone

George Arthur Probert, Jr. (March 5, 1927 – January 10, 2015) was an American jazz clarinetist, soprano saxophonist, and bandleader active principally on the Dixieland jazz revival circuit. He was born in Los Angeles.

Probert was an autodidact on his instruments. He played with Bob Scobey (1950–53) and then with Kid Ory's Creole Jazz Band. Between 1954 and 1969, he played in the Firehouse Five Plus Two Dixieland revival band, an ensemble formed by animators from Walt Disney Studios, and recorded with Disney composer George Bruns in 1957 and again in 1968. Probert led his own bands from 1973, touring America and Europe, especially The Netherlands. In 1997 Probert toured in England, Germany & the Netherlands with Big Bill Bissonnette's International Jazz Band; an all-star group which also featured Anthony "Tuba Fats" Lacen of New Orleans & British pianist Pat Hawes. He also worked as a television and movie music editor. He died on January 10, 2015, in Monrovia, California.

== Discography ==
- Siren Songs (Jazz Crusade, 1995)
- By George! It's Probert in England (Jazz Crusade, 1995)
- In the Gutter Big Bill Bissonnette's International Jazz Band (Jazz Crusade, 1997)
- Big Bill Bissonnette & His International Jazz Band Vol. 1 & 2 (Jazz Crusade, 1997)
- George Probert's Second Story Jazz Band (Jazzology, 2000)
- The Incredible George Probert (GHB Records BCD-70, 2015)
