= Joe Marsala =

Italian-American jazz clarinetist and songwriter (1907–1978)

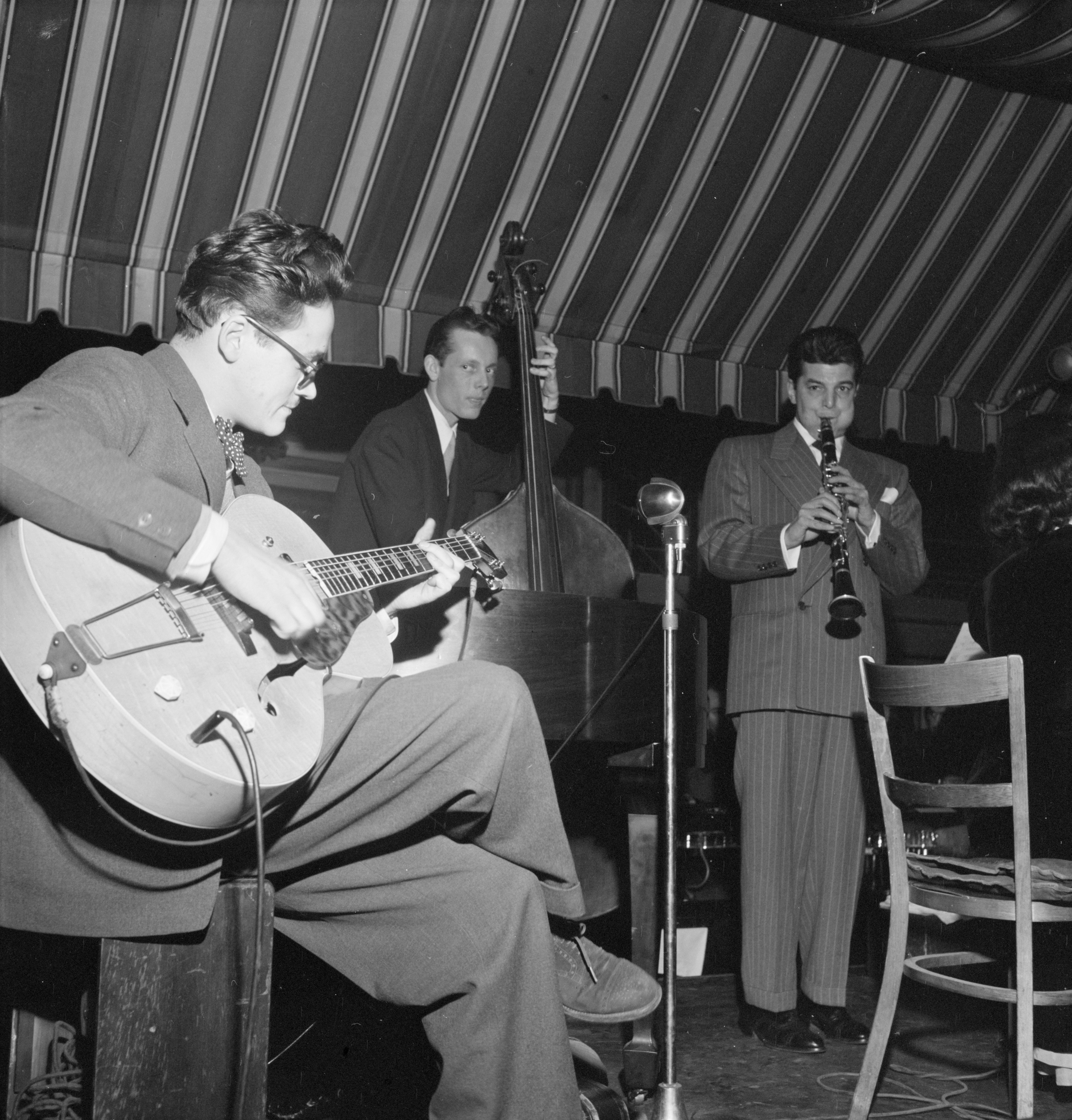
- Toots Thielemans and Joe Marsala (right). Photo: William P. Gottlieb

Background information
- Birth name: Joseph Francis Marsala
- Born: January 4, 1907; Chicago, Illinois, U.S.
- Died: March 4, 1978 (aged 71); Santa Barbara, California, U.S.
- Genres: Jazz, Dixieland, swing
- Occupation: Musician
- Instrument: Clarinet
- Years active: 1920s–1948
- Spouse: Adele Girard (m. 1937)

Joseph Francis Marsala (January 4, 1907 – March 4, 1978) was an Italian-American jazz clarinetist, alto and tenor saxophonist, and songwriter, older brother of trumpeter Marty Marsala.

== Music career ==
He was born in Chicago, Illinois, United States. In the 1920s, Marsala played guitar in clubs in his hometown of Chicago with Ben Pollack and Wingy Manone. After moving to New York City, he recorded and performed with Manone in the 1930s. As a leader, he worked with drummers Buddy Rich, Shelly Manne, and Dave Tough; guitarist Eddie Condon, pianist Joe Bushkin, trumpeter Max Kaminsky, his brother Marty Marsala, and his wife, jazz harpist Adele Girard. In 1948, he left professional performing and entered music publishing.

By 1949, he was writing traditional pop songs, including "Don't Cry, Joe (Let Her Go, Let Her Go, Let Her Go)", which was recorded by Frank Sinatra. The song led friends to the unfounded fear his marriage was over when in fact it was written for GIs who had returned home from World War II to find that their girlfriends had married someone else. He wrote "And So to Sleep Again" with Sunny Skylar and it was recorded by Patti Page in 1951.

Marsala taught clarinet to Bobby Gordon, the son of Jack Gordon, who worked for RCA Records. Marsala became Gordon's mentor and produced his records for Decca, including "Warm and Sentimental" and "Young Man's Fancy". Arbors Records released Bobby Gordon Plays Joe Marsala, Lower Register in 2007 and The Bobby Gordon Quartet Featuring Adele Girard Marsala, Don't Let It End, which featured Adele's last session for Arbors in 1992.

According to his wife, Marsala suffered from an allergy to nickel and had a rash on his hands from the nickel-plated keys on the clarinet. He was also bothered by colitis and was unable to drink alcohol for a time. Although his younger brother Marty was drafted, Marsala was an unacceptable candidate because of cartilage and ligament tears in his knee. He and his wife entertained stateside for the USO during the war years.

Marsala died of cancer in Santa Barbara, California on March 4, 1978, aged 71.

== Selected discography ==
- 1936-1942 The Chronological (Classics 763, 1994)
- 1944-1945 The Chronological (Classics 902, 1996)

== Sources ==
- Atteberry, Phillip D. "The Sweethearts of Swing: Adele Girard and Joe Marsala." The Mississippi Rag. April 1996
- Marsala Trampler, Eleisa, "Don't Let It End Pt. I: Joe Marsala". The Clarinet. June 2007
- Marsala Trampler, Eleisa, "Don't Let It End Pt. II: Bobby Gordon". The Clarinet. September 2007
- Marsala-Trampler, Eleisa, "Adele Girard Marsala: First Lady of the Jazz Harp". The American Harp Journal. Winter 2005
- Liner Notes: Bobby Gordon Plays Joe Marsala: Lower Register. Arbors. 2007
