= Yerba Buena Jazz Band =

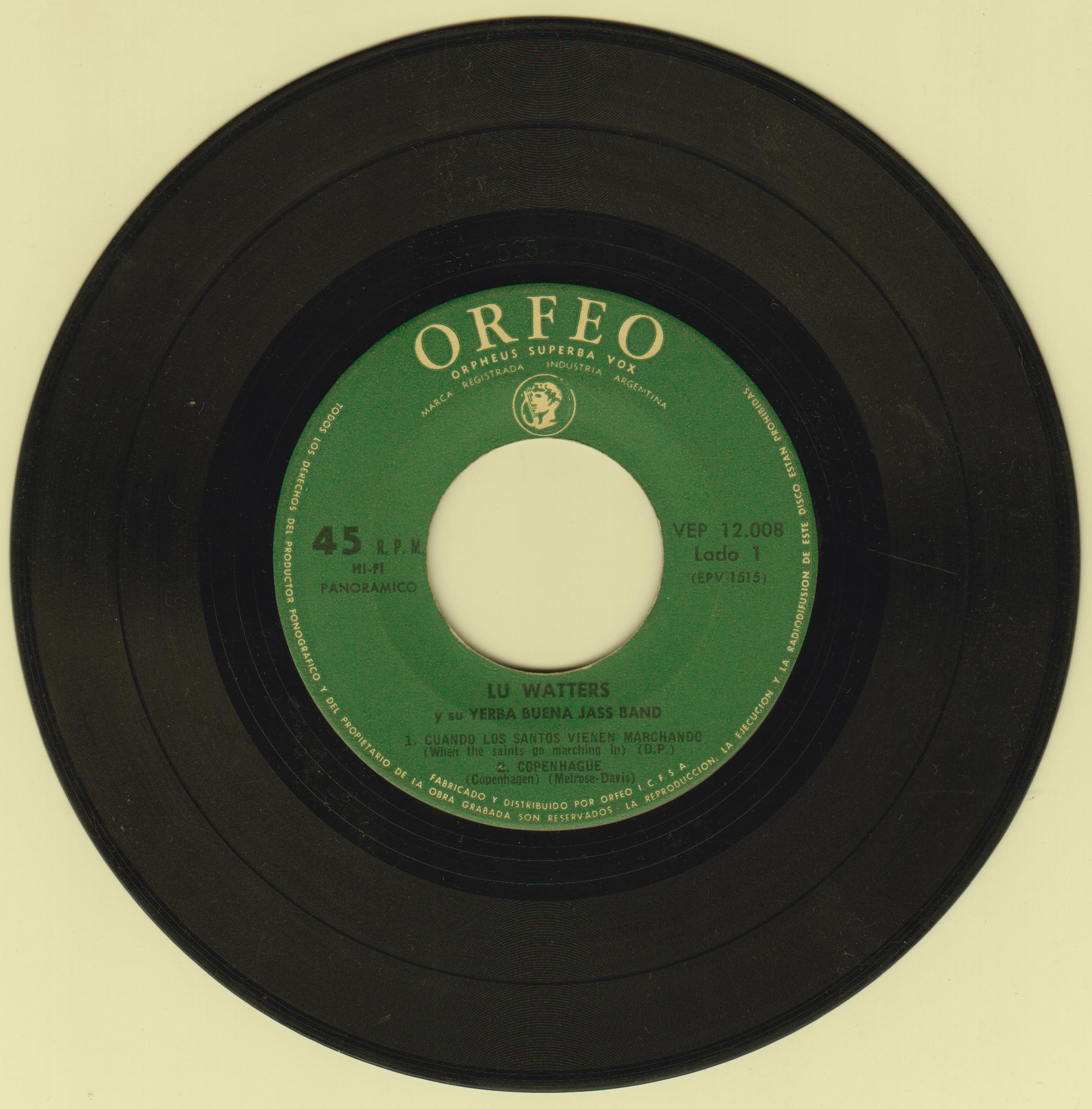
A maxi single record edited in Argentina.

Lu Watters & the Yerba Buena Jazz Band is the name of an American traditional jazz revival band founded by Lu Watters in 1940. Yerba Buena was the original name of San Francisco, California. Notable members included singer and banjoist Clancy Hayes, clarinetist Bob Helm, trumpeter Bob Scobey, trombonist Turk Murphy, tubist/bassist Dick Lammi, and Watters himself.

In the late 1930s, cornetist Lu Watters was playing commercial dance gigs in the San Francisco area. He went on tour across America with the Carol Lofner big band. While in New Orleans, he became interested in traditional jazz. Back in California, he assembled jam sessions with Bill Dart, Clancy Hayes, Bob Helm, Dick Lammi, Turk Murphy, and Wally Rose to play traditional jazz. His rehearsal spot was the Big Bear Lodge on Redwood Road in the Oakland hills.

In 1938, he formed a band that included Hayes, Helm, Squire Gersh, Bob Scobey, and Russell Bennett. The band found steady work at Sweet's Ballroom in Oakland, slipping in pieces of traditional New Orleans jazz into the repertoire until Watters was fired.

In 1939, he established the Yerba Buena Jazz Band to revive the New Orleans jazz style of King Oliver, adding trombone player Turk Murphy. (Yerba Buena was the first name of San Francisco.) He brought in pianist Forrest Browne, who taught the band music by Jelly Roll Morton.

Watters wrote music and arrangements to add to the traditional repertoire. The band performed at the Dawn Club in San Francisco, where it "began a phenomenally successful career as America’s first real revivalist band." It went on hiatus in 1942 when Watters entered the U.S. Navy but reunited at the Dawn Club after World War II.

After the Dawn closed in 1947, the band started the club Hambone Kelly's in El Cerrito, California. In 1949 the band performed with visiting musicians Kid Ory, James P. Johnson, and Mutt Carey. After Hambone Kelly's closed, the band broke up in 1950.

By 1959 the band had lost two key players, Bob Scobey and Turk Murphy, who had gone on their own. Watters ended the Yerba Vista Jazz Band. The Rough Guide concludes: “(they) had gone about as far as they could go: the revival had been launched worldwide and they had broadcast and recorded regularly for ten years.”

== Discography ==
During its ten year existence, the Yerba Buena Jazz Band recorded for several small labels.

In 1941 And 1942, the band recorded in San Francisco for the young label Jazz Man Records. Four sessions recorded for Jazz Man Records resulted in 19 released 78 rpm sides.

After the band reorganized in 1946 after World War II it recorded for another new label, West Coast Records. The first seven sessions were held on seven consecutive Monday evenings from April 16, 1946 to May 27 in San Francisco's Avalon Ballroom. The sound went by direct telephone line to a nearby recording studio where the masters were cut. West Coast recorded additional Avalon sessions in September the same year and February the next. The nine sessions resulted in 26 released sides on 78s.

During the fall of 1946, ABC radio broadcast a 15-minute show three times a week at 11:45 p.m. from the Dawn Club. A fan recorded selections of these shows for his personal enjoyment. Sixteen songs from these broadcasts were released on a Fairmont Records LP record in 1973.

The same fan also recorded a “This is Jazz” August 16, 1947 radio broadcast featuring the band. “This is Jazz” was a 1947 nationally broadcast radio series. Fairmont also released seven numbers from this broadcast on one side of an LP.

The above are all of the recordings of the band with its original front line of Watters, Scobey, and Murphy.

In 1949 and 1950, after Scobey and Murphy had left the band, several recordings were made at Hambone Kelly's for Norman Granz that resulted in 39 sides that were mostly released on Mercury, and later on Clef, Down Home, and Verve.

In January 1952, Good Time Records bought the masters from Jazz Man Records. It also acquired the masters from West Coast Records. The West Coast Records were reissued on three LPs (12001, 12002, and 12003) in 1954. The Jazz Man masters were also reissued on LP.

In 1993, Fantasy Records released a four-CD, 96 recordings, set of the Good Times' Yerba Buena recordings. It includes all but three of the band's released sides and several unreleased ones through 1947.

In 2001, Giants of Jazz, a label based in Italy, released a CD called San Francisco Style: Lu Watters Yerba Buena Jazz Band: Clancy Hays, vocals, containing 20 of the three dozen sides by the band from December 7, 1949 through the last recordings from mid-1950. By December 1949, both Bob Scobey and "Turk" Murphy had left the band.

All of the Jazz Man recordings were issued in the UK on Melodisc Records:

- Melodisc 1123 Original Jelly Roll Blues (Jelly Roll Morton)/ At a Georgia Camp Meeting (Mills)
- Melodisc 1124 Daddy Do (Fred Longshaw) /Millenberg Joys
- Melodisc 1125 Muskrat Ramble (Kid Ory)/ Smokey Mokes (Holzman)
- Melodisc 1126 Tiger Rag/Come Back Sweet Papa (Russell / Barbarin)
- Melodisc 1148 Creole Belles (Bodewalt)/ Chattanooga Stomp (King Oliver)
- Melodisc 1149 Working Man Blues (King Oliver) / Big Bear Stomp (Lu Watters)
- Melodisc 1150 Copenhagen (davis)/ Jazzin' Babies Blues (Jones)
- Melodisc 1158 1919 Rag (arr. by Lu Watters) / Ostrich Walk (Nick La Rocca)
- Melodisc 1170 South (Moten/Hayes)/ Richard M. Jones Blues
- Melodisc 1180 Friendless Blues / I'm Goin' Huntin' (Blythe/Bertrand)
