= List of Concord record labels =

This is a list of labels owned by Concord.

== Concord ==
- Concord Records
  - Concord Jazz
  - Heads Up International
  - Telarc International Corporation
- Fearless Records
  - Razor & Tie
  - Washington Square
- Rounder Records
  - Sugar Hill Records
  - Zoë Records
- Craft Recordings
  - Craft Latino
    - Fania Records
  - Milestone Records
  - Musart Records
  - Prestige Records
  - Stax Records
  - Varèse Sarabande
  - Vee-Jay Records
  - Victory Records
  - Wind-up Records
- Fantasy Records
  - Vanguard Records
- Kidz Bop
- Music For Little People
- Loma Vista Recordings (joint venture)
- Easy Eye Sound (joint venture)

== Defunct/dormant labels ==
- Feinery Records
- Flying Fish Records
- Galaxy Records
- Bandit Records
- HighTone Records
- Kicking Mule Records
- Playboy Jazz Records
- Reality Records
- Rockingale Records
- The Jazz Alliance Records
- Vee-Jay Records
- Volt Records
- Concord Picante
- Hear Music
- Monterey Jazz Festival Records
- Peak Records
- Specialty Records
- Telarc International Corporation
- Heads Up International
- Concord Concerto
- Stretch Records
- Sugar Hill Records
- Takoma Records
- The Bicycle Music Company
- Vanguard Records
- Wind-Up Records
- Contemporary Records
- Debut Records
- Good Time Jazz Records
- Nitro Records
- Milestone Records
- Original Blues Classics
- Original Jazz Classics
- Pablo Records
- Prestige Records
- Riverside Records
- Fania Records
- Independiente
- Delicious Vinyl
