= George Lewis & Turk Murphy at Newport =

1957 live album by George Lewis/Turk Murphy

Live album by George Lewis / Turk Murphy
- Released: 1957
- Recorded: July 4 & 6, 1957
- Venue: Newport Jazz Festival, RI
- Genre: Jazz
- Label: Verve; MGV 8232
- Producer: Norman Granz

George Lewis chronology
George Lewis of New Orleans (1956)	George Lewis & Turk Murphy at Newport (1957)	The Perennial George Lewis (1958)

Turk Murphy chronology
The Music of Jelly Roll Morton (1954) (1954)	George Lewis & Turk Murphy at Newport (1957) (1957)	Music for Wise Guys & Boosters, Card Sharps & Crap Shooters (1959) (1959)

Professional ratings
Review scores
Source	Rating
AllMusic	3/5 stars

George Lewis & Turk Murphy at Newport is a live album by George Lewis' Sextet and Turk Murphy's Septet recorded at the Newport Jazz Festival in 1957 and released on the Verve label.

== Track listing ==
1. "Basin Street Blues" (Spencer Williams) – 1:28
2. "Bourbon Street Parade" (Paul Barbarin) – 5:15
3. "Tin Roof Blues" (George Brunies, Paul Mares, Ben Pollack, Leon Roppolo, Mel Stitzel) – 6:37
4. "Royal Garden Blues" (Clarence Williams, Spencer Williams) – 4:06
5. "That's a Plenty" (Lew Pollack, Ray Gilbert) – 4:55
6. "St. James Infirmary" (Joe Primrose) – 4:23
7. "Weary Blues" (Artie Matthews) – 3:29
8. "Down by the Riverside" (Traditional) – 3:55
- Recorded at the Newport Jazz Festival, Newport, RI on July 4, 1957 (tracks 1–5) and July 6, 1957 (tracks 6–8)

== Personnel ==
=== Tracks 1–5 ===
- George Lewis – clarinet
- Jack Willis – trumpet
- Bob Thomas – trombone
- Joe Robichaux – piano
- Alcide "Slow Drag" Pavageau – bass
- Joe Watkins – drums

=== Tracks 6–8 ===
- Turk Murphy – trombone, vocals
- Larry Conger – trumpet
- Bill Napier – clarinet
- Peter Clute – piano
- Dick Lammi – banjo
- Al Conger – tuba
- Thad Vandon – drums
