= Dick Roberts (musician) =

American musician

Charles "Dick" Roberts, (October 9, 1897 – November 1, 1966) was a professional banjo and guitar player.

Roberts was born in Virginia. He substituted for Harper Goff with the Firehouse Five Plus Two when the latter had to leave the band because of his increasing engagements with Walt Disney's cartoon and movie productions. Roberts also founded and led The Banjo Kings, an American banjo band, with Red Roundtree.

He also appeared in the movie "Banjo On My Knee" (1936). He died in Los Angeles, California.
