= Pinocchio James =

Cornelius "Pinocchio" James (December 23, 1927 — May 6, 1982) was an African-American singer of jazz and rhythm and blues. Jazz writer Richard Cook stated that he was "a singer in the Joe Williams mould".

== Life and career ==
Pinocchio James was born in Macon, Georgia on December 23, 1927. He was educated at Artie Matthews's Cosmopolitan School of Music in Cincinnati. He served in the United States Army from 1946 through 1949. He first appeared as a soloist in the entertainment industry and also recorded under his own name, in 1951. His single "Camp Meeting/333 Jump" was released by Okeh Records that year.

In 1953, accompanied by Todd Rhodes and his orchestra, he performed the song "Your Mouth's Got a Hole in It", a regional hit in 1953. Another song was "Pinnochio's Blues" (recorded 1951); it was re-released on the compilation The Okeh Rhythm and Blues Story 1949-1957, Vol. 2.

James became a member of the stage group of the Lionel Hampton Orchestra in 1957. He stayed with Hampton until the mid-1960s. In 1958 he performed with Hampton and his orchestra on tour to Belgium and Germany. and performed with Hampton on the Ed Sullivan Show. On Hampton's label Glad Records, James recorded the songs "New Orleans Woman" (1958), "Kidney Stew" (1959), "Hey! Ba-Ba-Re-Bop" (1959), and "Everybody Loves My Baby" (1961).

James's filmed a recording of "Georgia on My Mind" in 1965 that was later included on video compilation Meet the Bandleaders (1984, Swingtime Video). He also recorded that song with Hampton in 1963. He died on May 6, 1982.
