= Squire Gersh =

American jazz tubist and double-bassist (1913–1983)

William Girsback (May 13, 1913 in San Francisco - April 27, 1983), better known as Squire Gersh, was an American jazz tubist and double-bassist.

== Life and career ==
Gersh played in San Francisco with Lu Watters, Bob Scobey, Turk Murphy, and Mutt Carey; he recorded with Watters in 1942 and with Murphy multiple times between 1950 and 1966. He accompanied Louis Armstrong on record and for a tour of South America between 1956 and 1958, then played in Europe with Kid Ory and Red Allen in 1959.
