= Harper Goff =

American artist, musician and actor

- Born: Ralph Harper Goff; March 16, 1911; Fort Collins, Colorado, U.S.
- Died: March 3, 1993 (aged 81); Palm Springs, California, U.S.
- Education: Chouinard Art Institute
- Occupations: Artist, musician, actor
- Years active: 1935–1993
- Spouse: Flossie Newcomb (m. 1933)

Harper Goff (March 16, 1911 – March 3, 1993), born Ralph Harper Goff, was an American artist, musician, and actor. For many years, he was associated with The Walt Disney Company, in the process of which he contributed to various major films, as well as to the planning of the Disney theme parks. During World War II, he was also an advisor to the U.S. Army on camouflage (Blechman 2004; Behrens 2009).

== Early life ==
Goff was born in Fort Collins, Colorado to parents Ralph Algene Goff and Elizabeth Maude Goff (maiden name Anderson). He grew up in Fort Collins and rode the trolley around the then 8,000 populated town. At age 12, his moved to California.

He studied art at Chouinard Art Institute in Westlake, Los Angeles, then moved to New York City, where he worked as a magazine illustrator, producing artwork for Collier's, Esquire and National Geographic. As a designer, he sometimes produced advertising for the U.S. Army.

== Camouflage service ==
During World War II, by his own account, Goff was approached for advice about camouflage paint by the U.S. Army, because he had been "making paint and working on a do-it-yourself painter's kit" (Naversen 1989, p. 150). Assigned to a camouflage research facility at Fort Belvoir, Virginia, he developed a set of paint colors (which he compared to paint-by-number kits) that were used as "standard issue" hues for camouflage, as well as a camouflage pigment that was chemically impermanent, enabling its removal when it was no longer needed. Later in the war, he transferred to the U.S. Navy where (in his words) "I was working on confusing the silhouettes of ships" [not unlike dazzle camouflage] (Naversen 1989, p. 151).

== Film career ==
Returning to the U.S., Goff moved back to California and worked as a set designer for Warner Bros., producing the sets for such memorable films as Sergeant York, Charge of the Light Brigade, and Captain Blood. Goff was a lifelong model train enthusiast. In 1951, while in a London model-making shop, he met Walt Disney when they both wanted to buy the same model train.

As a result of having met Disney, he joined the Los Angeles artistic team of the Walt Disney Studios, a relationship that continued, off and on, until his death in 1993. His extraordinary work gave a distinctive character to a number of Disney productions. He is specifically credited with many of the finest inventive effects in Disney's groundbreaking live-action film, 20,000 Leagues Under the Sea, which he art-directed, even though the movie credit reads: "Production Developed By..." Goff designed the exterior of the Nautilus, along with sets for every compartment within the submarine. The film was awarded two Academy Awards, for color art direction and best special effects. At that time, in 1954, the Art Directors Union had created a bylaw within the Academy of Motion Pictures, which stated that only union art directors could win the award. The academy gave the award for "Best Art Direction — Color 1954", to Goff's assistant, John Meehan, because he had a union card. Goff went on to get a union card, but was never given the award.

Years later, Goff created the submarine, Proteus, for the film, Fantastic Voyage (Working again with 20.000 Leagues director Richard Fleischer), and art-directed the highly acclaimed Willy Wonka & the Chocolate Factory.

Goff also contributed heavily to the early renderings and concept art for Disney's proposed Mickey Mouse Park, which became the theme park known as Disneyland, and several areas of Walt Disney World theme park.

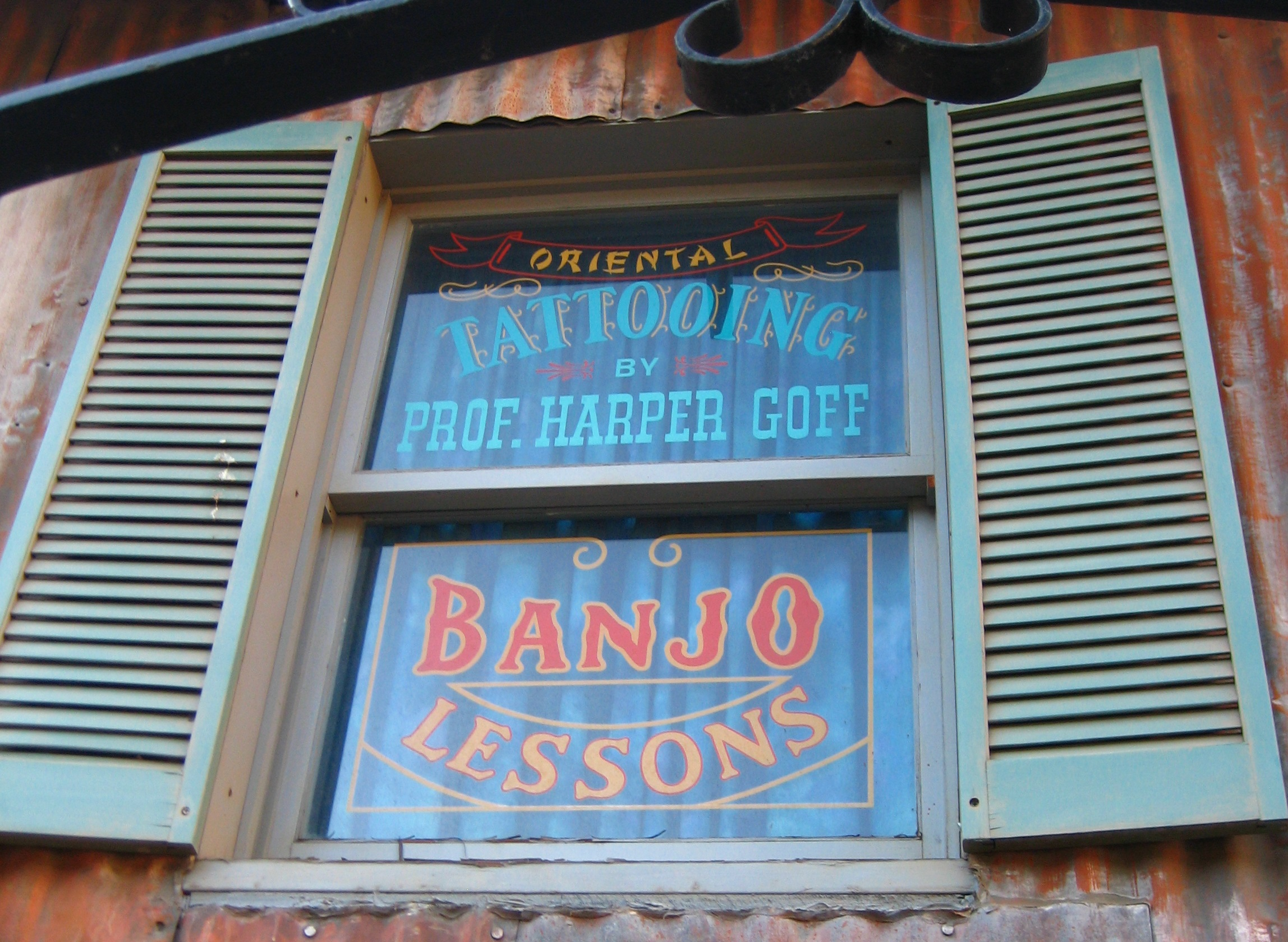
Harper Goff window in Disneyland above the Adventureland Bazaar shop

He also played the banjo in the seven-piece Dixieland band called Firehouse Five Plus Two, formed by other Disney staff and led by trombonist Ward Kimball with animator Frank Thomas on the piano. He was also known as a good whistler, with his whistling used in the Mickey Mouse Club and for the Firehouse Five Plus Two. When Tom Sawyer Island opened in 1973 at Magic Kingdom, they named Harper's Mill after him. Just above the Adventureland Bazaar shop in Disneyland, there is a window dedicated to Goff for his time in Walt Disney Imagineering. In 1993, he was posthumously named a Disney Legend.

== Personal life and death ==
Goff was married more than 60 years to his wife Flossie Newcomb. He died at his home in Palm Springs, California, on March 3, 1993, at the age on 81 due to heart failure.

== Art direction credits ==
- 1942: Casablanca (Set Designer)
- 1951: Mickey Mouse Park (later renamed Disneyland) (Concept Artist, e.g., contributed ideas to Main Street, U.S.A. and Jungle Cruise)
- 1954: 20,000 Leagues Under the Sea (Art Director)
- 1955: Pete Kelly's Blues (Production Designer)
- 1956: The Great Locomotive Chase (Production Research)
- 1957: The Vikings (Production designer 1957–1958)
- 1966: Fantastic Voyage (Creative Production Research)
- 1971: Willy Wonka & the Chocolate Factory (Art Director)

== Acting credits ==
As an actor, he also played the following roles:

- 1950: Hit Parade of 1951 — Jazz Musician
- 1951: Detective Story — Gallantz (uncredited)
- 1952: Carrie — Man (uncredited)
- 1953: Dragnet (Episode 2.18: "The Big Break") — Roy Townsend
- 1954: Dragnet (Episode 3.31: "The Big Girl") — Emil Collins
- 1954: Dragnet — Employee, Melrose Bridge Club (uncredited)
- 1954: 20,000 Leagues Under the Sea — Minister in San Francisco Steam Packet office (uncredited)
- 1955: The Adventures of Ozzie and Harriet (Episode 3.24: "The Witness") — Man
- 1955: Pete Kelly's Blues — Tuxedo Band member (uncredited) (final film role)
