= Adele Girard =

American jazz harpist

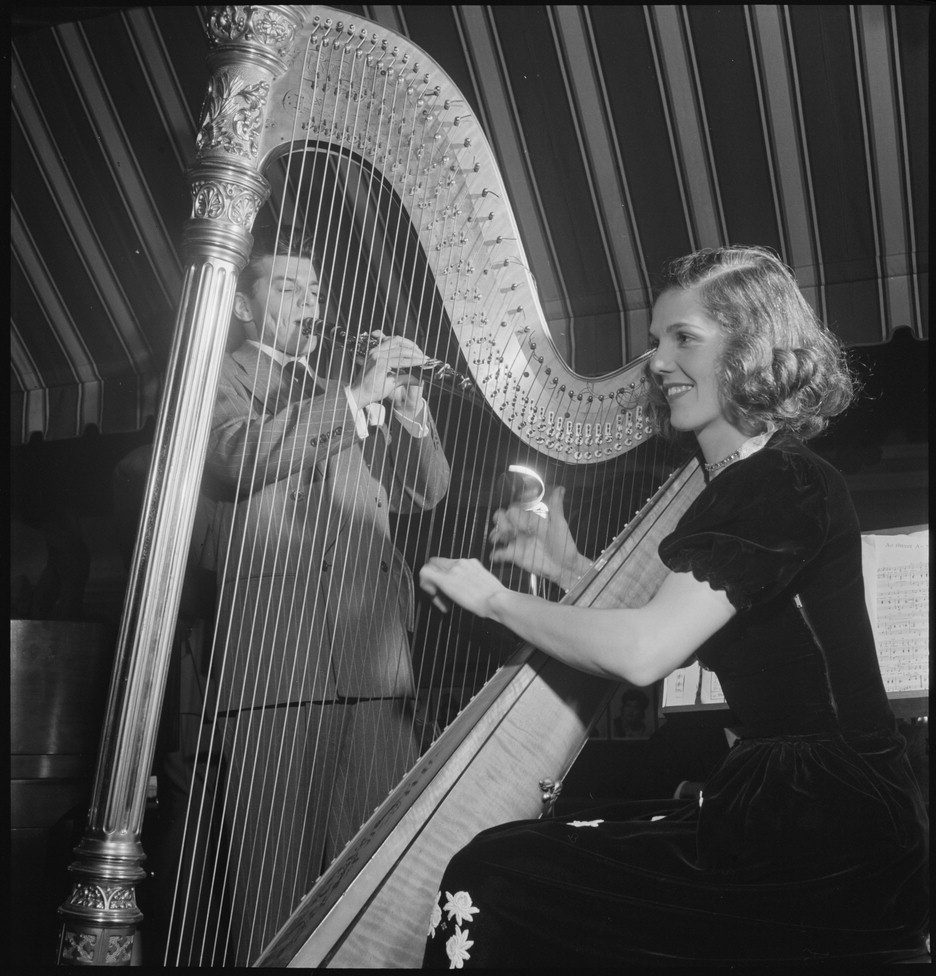
- Girard and Joe Marsala

Background information
- Birth name: Adele Beatrice Girard
- Born: June 25, 1913; Holyoke, Massachusetts, U.S.
- Died: September 7, 1993 (aged 80); Denver, Colorado, U.S.
- Genres: Jazz, dixieland, swing
- Occupation: Musician
- Instrument: Harp
- Spouse: Joe Marsala (1937-1978; his death)

Adele Beatrice Girard Marsala (née Girard; June 25, 1913 – September 7, 1993) was a jazz harpist associated with dixieland and swing music. She is the first woman to bring the concert harp to prominence in jazz, with only Casper Reardon preceding her. As a musician she is known by her birth name Adele Girard, but she became Adele Girard Marsala after marrying clarinetist Joe Marsala.

== Biography ==
Adele Girard's father, Leon, was a violinist who conducted and played in the pit orchestra for silent movies at the Bijou Theater in Holyoke, Massachusetts. He conducted the Holyoke City Band and the Springfield Broadcast Symphony. Girard's mother, Eleisa Noel Girard, was a pianist who studied opera and had been offered a scholarship to La Scala in Italy, though she turned it down because she was unable to afford the trip. She taught both her children, Adele and Don, how to play piano. When she was four, Girard accompanied her uncles as they sang "K-K-K-Katie" and "Over There", songs from the First World War.

At age fourteen, she was given harp lessons by Alice Mikus, a family friend who played in the Springfield Broadcasting Symphony. In 1933, she got a job as a vocalist with the Harry Sosnik orchestra in Chicago. When Sosnik learned she could play the harp, he bought her one. She performed with the Dick Stabile orchestra in New York City in 1935 and in 1936 with the Three Ts, the Teagarden brothers (Jack and Charles) and Frankie Trumbauer at the Hickory House in New York City on 52nd Street. She replaced harpist Casper Reardon, who had been hired for a Broadway show.

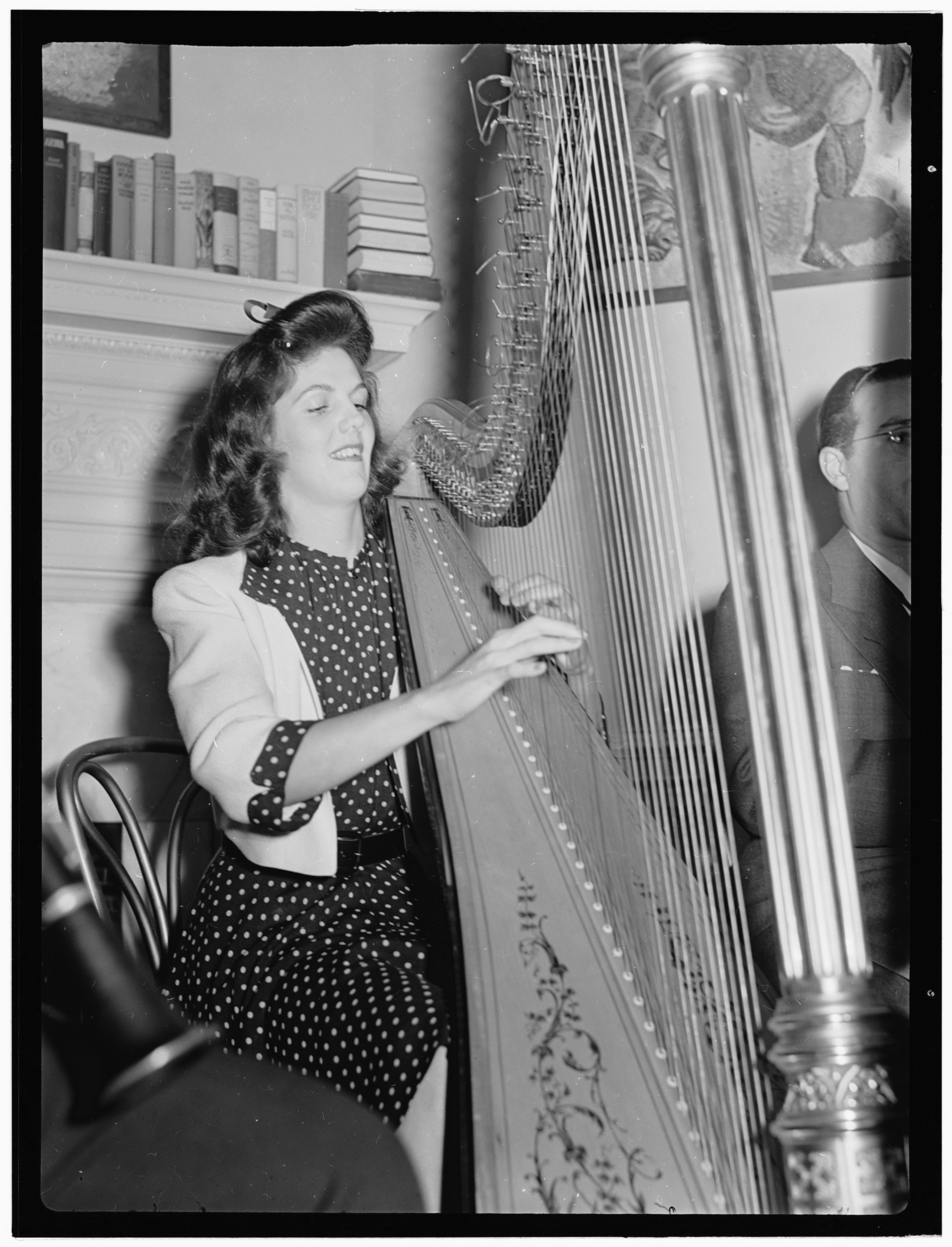
Girard in the 1930s at the Turkish Embassy in Washington, D.C.

When the Ts toured, Girard worried that she would be unable to continue payments on her first harp. She asked the proprietor of Hickory House to keep her on, and he introduced her to Joe Marsala. In 1937 she wed Marsala and became a member of his band.

Marsala's band included Eddie Condon and Buddy Rich. The Marsalas worked in the house band at Hickory House for ten years. He introduced her to Shelly Manne, Charlie Byrd, Gene DiNovi, and Neal Hefti.

In 1946, Marsala found a job at ABC as a studio musician while Girard worked for NBC. Although Marsala was unhappy with the work, he wrote the song "Don't Cry Joe" which became a hit when it was recorded by Frank Sinatra. Inspired by a photograph of Aspen in Life magazine, they bought a station wagon and moved to Colorado. Marsala co-wrote the musical I've Had It, which made fun of Aspen's mixture of cowboys and classical musicians. Girard sang in the leading role.

Although Marsala tried to take the show beyond Colorado, he was unsuccessful, and in 1954 the couple returned to New York City where Marsala helped start a music publishing company, Beatrice Music, that bore Adele Girard's first name. Girad returned to studio work. Beatrice Music was bought by Seeburg Music Corporation in 1962 and Marsala was hired as vice president. He helped organize the album Warm and Sentimental by clarinetist Bobby Gordon on which Girard recorded.

Back in Chicago, Girard drifted out of music and spent her time restoring furniture, drawing, painting, and ice skating. When Seeburg struggled financially, she and Marsala moved to California, where she was hired to teach drama at the University of California. She played piano for some of the shows and occasionally filled an acting role. She and Marsala performed publicly for the last time in 1970 during a two-week residency at Donte's in North Hollywood, where visiting sidemen included Shelly Manne, Dick Cary, Neil Hefti, and Leonard Feather. After Marsala died in 1978, Girard performed at venues along the California coast, sometimes accompanied by Bobby Gordon. Despite having suffered two strokes, she agreed to record the album Don't Let It End (Arbors, 1991) with Gordon.

The song was Marsala's tribute to the swing era. Girard died from congestive heart failure in Denver, Colorado, in 1993.

== Sources ==
- Atteberry, Phillip D. "The Sweethearts of Swing: Adele Girard and Joe Marsala". The Mississippi Rag. April 1996
- Marsala Trampler, Eleisa, "Don't Let It End Pt. I: Joe Marsala". The Clarinet. June 2007
- Marsala Trampler, Eleisa, "Don't Let It End Pt. II: Bobby Gordon". The Clarinet. September 2007
- Marsala-Trampler, Eleisa, "Adele Girard Marsala: First Lady of the Jazz Harp". The American Harp Journal. Winter 2005
- Liner Notes: Bobby Gordon Plays Joe Marsala: Lower Register. Arbors. 2007
