= Marty Marsala =

American jazz trumpeter (1908–1975)

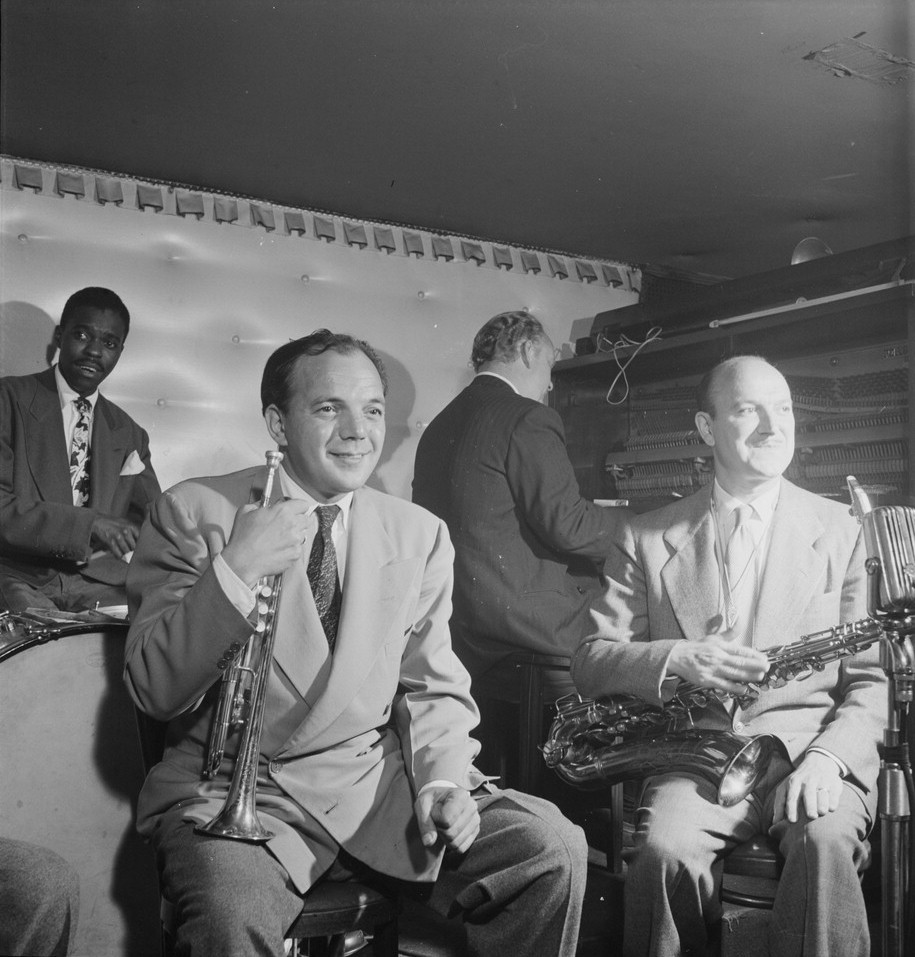
- Marty Marsala and Bud Freeman. Photo: William P. Gottlieb.

Background information
- Born: Martin Samuel Marsala; April 2, 1908; Chicago, Illinois, US
- Died: April 27, 1975 (aged 67) Chicago, Illinois, US
- Genres: Jazz; Swing; Dixieland
- Occupation: Trumpeter
- Instrument: Trumpet

Martin Samuel Marsala (April 2, 1908 – April 27, 1975) was an American jazz trumpeter born in Chicago, perhaps best known for working from 1926-1946 with his brother Joe Marsala in a big band in New York City and Chicago. He had also toured with various artists, such as Chico Marx and Miff Mole, to name a few. During the 1940s Marsala was a celebrated West Coast jazz trumpeter, commuting back and forth from Chicago to San Francisco frequently. In various club settings Marsala shared stages with Earl Hines and Sidney Bechet.

== Biography ==
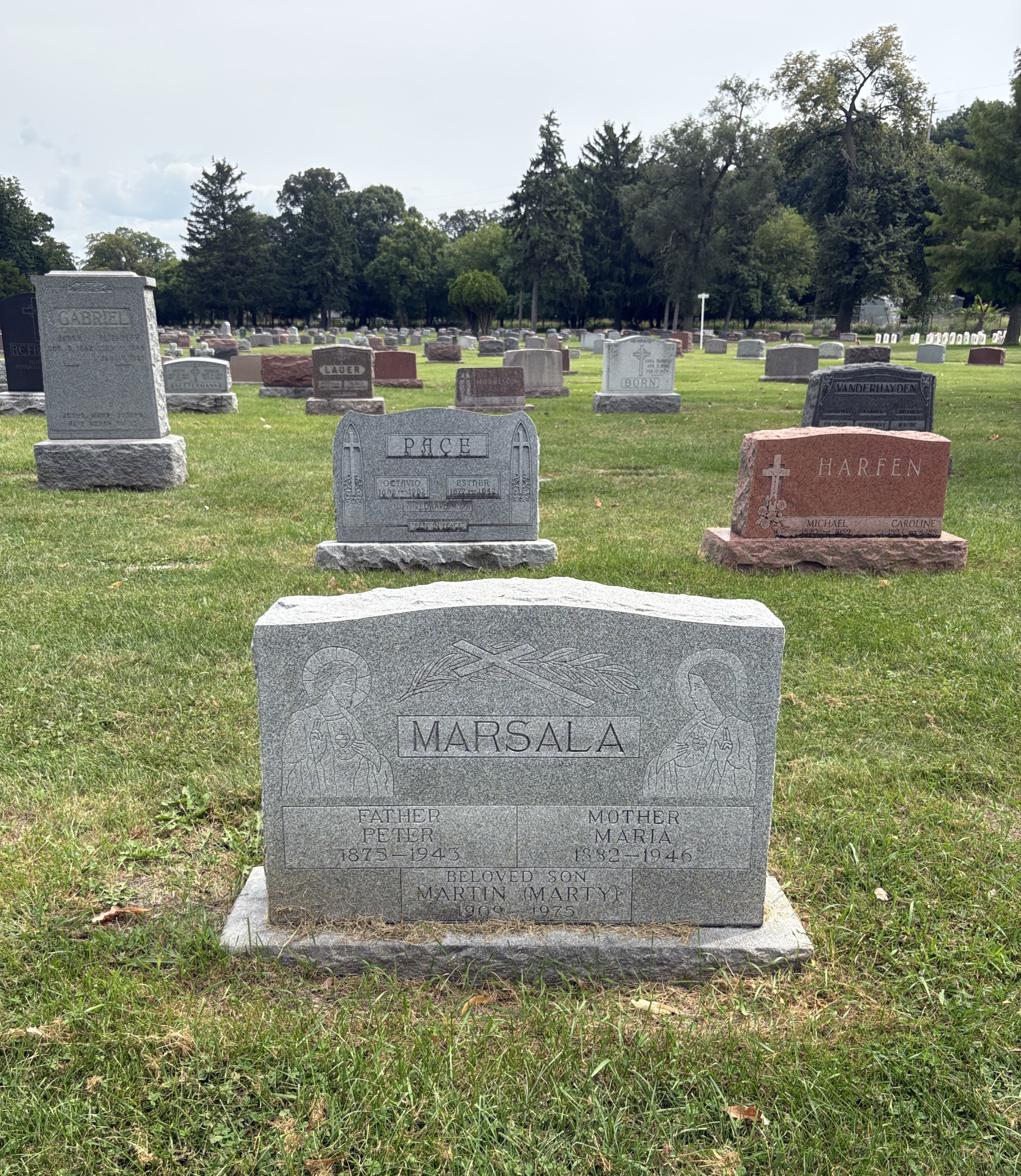
Marsla's grave at St. Joseph Cemetery

Marty Marsala began his professional career playing drums for bands led by Joe Bananas and Red Feilen in Chicago. During the 1920s he switched to the trumpet and soon joined his brother Joe Marsala's band in New York City following years as a freelance musician in Chicago, trumpeting for them from 1936 to 1941. In 1937 and 1938 he also worked with Bob Howard and Tempo King.

He worked with the Will Hudson Orchestra and then led a local band for a while, joining Chico Marx's band and playing for them from 1942 to 1943; the band was technically led by Ben Pollack, but performed under Marx's name. He served briefly in the United States Army from 1944–1945. After service he toured between San Francisco and Chicago, playing much dixieland with his brother again as well as Miff Mole and Tony Parenti. He became especially popular in California during these years. In 1955 he moved permanently to San Francisco and began leading his own groups and recording with Kid Ory and Earl Hines. During the 1960s his health deteriorated and he retired from performing in 1965, never recording under his own name.

He died in Chicago on April 27, 1975, and was buried at St. Joseph Cemetery in River Grove, Illinois.

== Discography ==
Year	Album	Leader	Label
1936	"Tempo King"	Tempo King	Timeless Records
1955	"At Club Hangover"	Earl Hines	Storyville Records
1999	"The Complete Kid Ory Verve Sessions"	Kid Ory	Verve Records
1936–1942	Joe Marsala: 1936-1942	Joe Marsala	Classics Records
