= Clancy Hayes =

American jazz vocalist and banjo player (1908–1972)

Clarence Leonard Hayes (November 14, 1908 – March 13, 1972) was an American jazz vocalist and banjo player. His regular banjo was a six string one, which is tuned as a guitar.

== Early life ==
Hayes was born in Caney, Kansas, on November 14, 1908. As a child, he learned the drums, then switched to guitar and banjo.

== Later life and career ==
Hayes was part of a vaudeville troupe in the Midwest after 1923, and lived in San Francisco from 1927. He became more popular in the 1930s through radio and club performances. From 1938 to 1940 he played in a big band led by Lu Watters, after which he spent a decade with the Yerba Buena Jazz Band, playing rhythm banjo and, on occasion, drums. He spent almost all of the 1950s singing with Bob Scobey's band.

In the 1960s he led his own bands, which also recorded for various labels. He also played with the Firehouse Five Plus Two, Turk Murphy, and a group that evolved into the World's Greatest Jazz Band. As a vocalist, "Hayes was noted for his straightforward singing of ballads and his flamboyant delivery of livelier songs." He died in San Francisco on March 13, 1972.

Clancy's biography and discography: Clancy Hayes - The Swinging Minstrel, written by Chris Reid with Hal Smith, was published in September 2025 by Hardinge Simpole.

== Discography ==
- Clancy Hayes and His Washboard Five (Down Home, 1951)
- Cakewalk to Lindy Hop (Columbia, 1956)
- Clancy Hayes Sings (Verve, 1957)
- Clancy Hayes' Dixieland Band (Audio Fidelity, 1960)
- Swingin' Minstrel (Good Time Jazz, 1963)
- Oh! By Jingo (Delmark, 1964)
- Happy Melodies (ABC-Paramount, 1965)
- Live at Earthquake McGoon's (ABC-Paramount, 1966)
- More of Manassas (Fat Cat Jazz, 1969)
- Mr. Hayes Goes to Washington (Clanco, 1972)
- Satchel of Song (San Francisco Traditional Jazz Foundation, 2001)

With Bob Scobey

- The San Francisco Jazz of Bob Scobey (Verve, 1957)
- Between 18th and 19th on Any Street (RCA Victor, 1957)
- Beauty and the Beat (RCA Victor, 1957)
- Direct from San Francisco! (Good Time Jazz, 1957)
- Scobey & Clancy Raid the Juke Box (California, 1958)
- College Classics (RCA Victor, 1958)
