= Firehouse Five Plus Two =

1940s-1970s Dixieland Band of Disney Studios cartoonists who often played at Disneyland

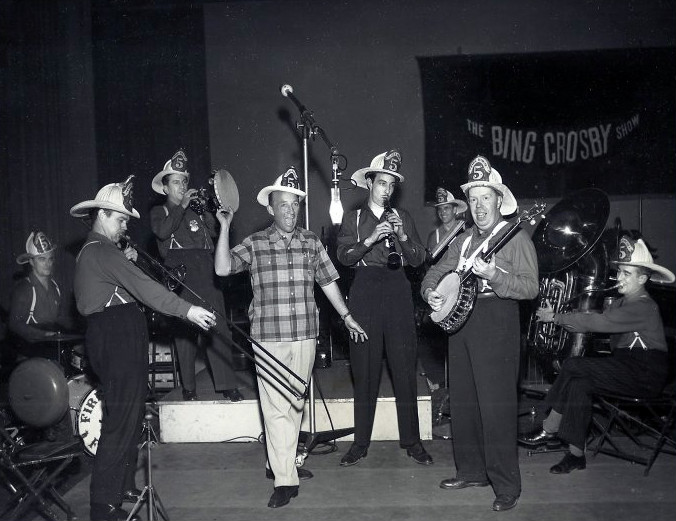
The band with Bing Crosby for an appearance on his CBS radio program, 1950

The Firehouse Five Plus Two was an American Dixieland jazz band, popular in the 1950s, consisting of members of the Disney animation department. Ward Kimball, the leader and trombonist, was inspired to form the band after spending time with members of the Disney animation and sound department and finding they were jazz aficionados and amateur musicians. The lunchtime chats escalated into a full-on lunchtime jam session as Kimball and animator Frank Thomas, a pianist, found they "sounded pretty good all by ourselves." The band went by two other names, the Huggajeedy Eight and the San Gabriel Valley Blue Blowers. The "Firehouse" motif came from a 1916 American LaFrance fire engine that Kimball restored for the local Horseless Carriage Club, and the "Five Plus Two" from the band's original lineup of seven.

The band was also formative in creating the Good Time Jazz label under their fellow aficionado Lester Koenig, who managed all the band's releases from 1940's The Firehouse Five Plus Two Story, Volume 1 to 1970's Live at Earthquake McGoon's. Walt Disney approved of the band, letting them play at the company's Christmas parties, at Disneyland, and other social functions, on the single condition that they never fully leave their jobs at the studio.

== Members ==
The formative members of the band, as listed in the liner notes for The Firehouse Five Plus Two Story.

- Danny Alguire — (Cornet), fingerprint expert formerly with L.A. police department, assistant director at Disney. (1949-1952; 1954-1972; 1980)
- Harper Goff —(Banjo), illustrator at Warner Brothers and Colliers Magazine, Disney designer and Imagineer. (1949-1952; 1954-1956; 1980)
- Ward Kimball — (Trombone, siren, tambourine, sound effects, washboard, leader), lead animator and director for Walt Disney Animation and Disney Studios. (1949-1952; 1954-1972; 1980)
- Clarke Mallery — (Clarinet), animator for Superman and Aquaman cartoons of the 1960s. (1949-1952)
- Monte Mountjoy — (Drums), formerly with Bob Wills. (1949-1954)
- Erdman (Ed) Penner — (Soprano saxophone, bass saxophone on early recordings, later switched to tuba), story man for Walt Disney Animation, died in 1956. (1949-1952; 1954-1956)
- Frank Thomas — Piano, lead animator for Walt Disney Animation. (1949-1952; 1954-1965; 1980)

Later, other Disney artists and professional jazz musicians joined in:

- George Bruns - Tuba and trombone, substituting for Kimball, composer for many Disney animated and live action films. (1956-1966)
- Eddie Forrest - Drummer for the Disney Studios Orchestra and the Hollywood Bowl Orchestra. (1955-1972; 1980)
- Don Kinch - Tuba, substituting for Ed Penner following his death. (1960-1972)
- Jimmy MacDonald - Drums, Voice Actor, Foley artist and head of Disney sound department. (1949; 1954-1955)
- George Probert - Clarinet, and soprano sax, former assistant director at Disney. (1954-1972; 1980)
- Dick Roberts - Banjo, leader of the Banjo Kings. (1960-1966)

Timeline

== Discography ==
In addition to many singles, the band recorded at least thirteen LP records, starting in 1949. The last album, Live at Earthquake McGoon's, was recorded in 1970 in San Francisco. This list includes only 12” LPs. The first four ltems are reissues of previously released 78 rpm records and 10” LPs. They have subsequently been re-released on CD and remain available.

- The Firehouse Five Plus Two Story*, Part One (1951)
- The Firehouse Five Plus Two Story*, Part Two (1951)
- The Firehouse Five Plus Two Story*, Part Three (1952)
- The Firehouse Five Plus Two Story*, Part Four (1952)
- The Firehouse Five Plus Two Plays for Lovers (1956)
- The Firehouse Five Plus Two, Volume Five: Goes South! (1956)
- The Firehouse Five Plus Two Goes To Sea (1957)
- The Firehouse Five Plus Two Dixieland Favorites (1960)
- The Firehouse Five Plus Two Crashes a Party (1960)
- The Firehouse Five Plus Two Around the World (1961)
- The Firehouse Five Plus Two At Disneyland (1962)
- The Firehouse Five Plus Two Goes To a Fire (1964)
- The Firehouse Five Plus Two Twenty Years Later (1970)
- The Firehouse Five Plus Two Live at Earthquake McGoon's (1970)

(* also released as a 4-record album)

== In popular culture ==
In early Pogo comic strips, former Disney animator Walt Kelly featured a band called "The Firehouse Five Glee and Pilau Society". One 1950 Sunday strip featured a caricature of Ward Kimball as "Kimbo Cat".

In 1977, comedian Ray Stevens recorded a "chicken clucking" version of Glenn Miller's "In the Mood" under the name "Henhouse Five Plus Too".

=== Televised/film appearances ===
The band appeared in several Disney television specials, including their first special in 1950, One Hour In Wonderland. They also appeared on the early Mickey Mouse Club television shows and appeared in animated form in the 1953 Goofy animated short, "How to Dance".

The band also received an homage in the direct-to-video 1999 Disney movie Mickey's Once Upon a Christmas, where a band composed of actual firefighters played a jazzy rendition of "Jingle Bells" to help with a toy drive along with Mickey in "The Gift of the Magi" segment.

The band received an homage in the ending of the 2009 Disney film The Princess and the Frog, with the jazz-playing alligator Louis now belonging to a group called "The Firefly Five Plus Lou". A caricature of Frank Thomas is seen playing the piano.

Besides appearing in Disney productions, the band also appeared with Teresa Brewer in the 1951 Universal short "Teresa Brewer and the Firehouse Five Plus Two" and appeared as themselves in the 1951 Kathryn Grayson film, Grounds for Marriage. The Firehouse Five Plus Two also appeared on A Merry Christmas with Bing Crosby and the Andrews Sisters on February 22, 1950, sponsored by Chesterfield cigarettes.
