= Bob Helm =

American jazz clarinetist and saxophonist (1914–2002)

Robert Marshall Helm (July 18, 1914 – September 1, 2002) was a jazz clarinetist and saxophonist.

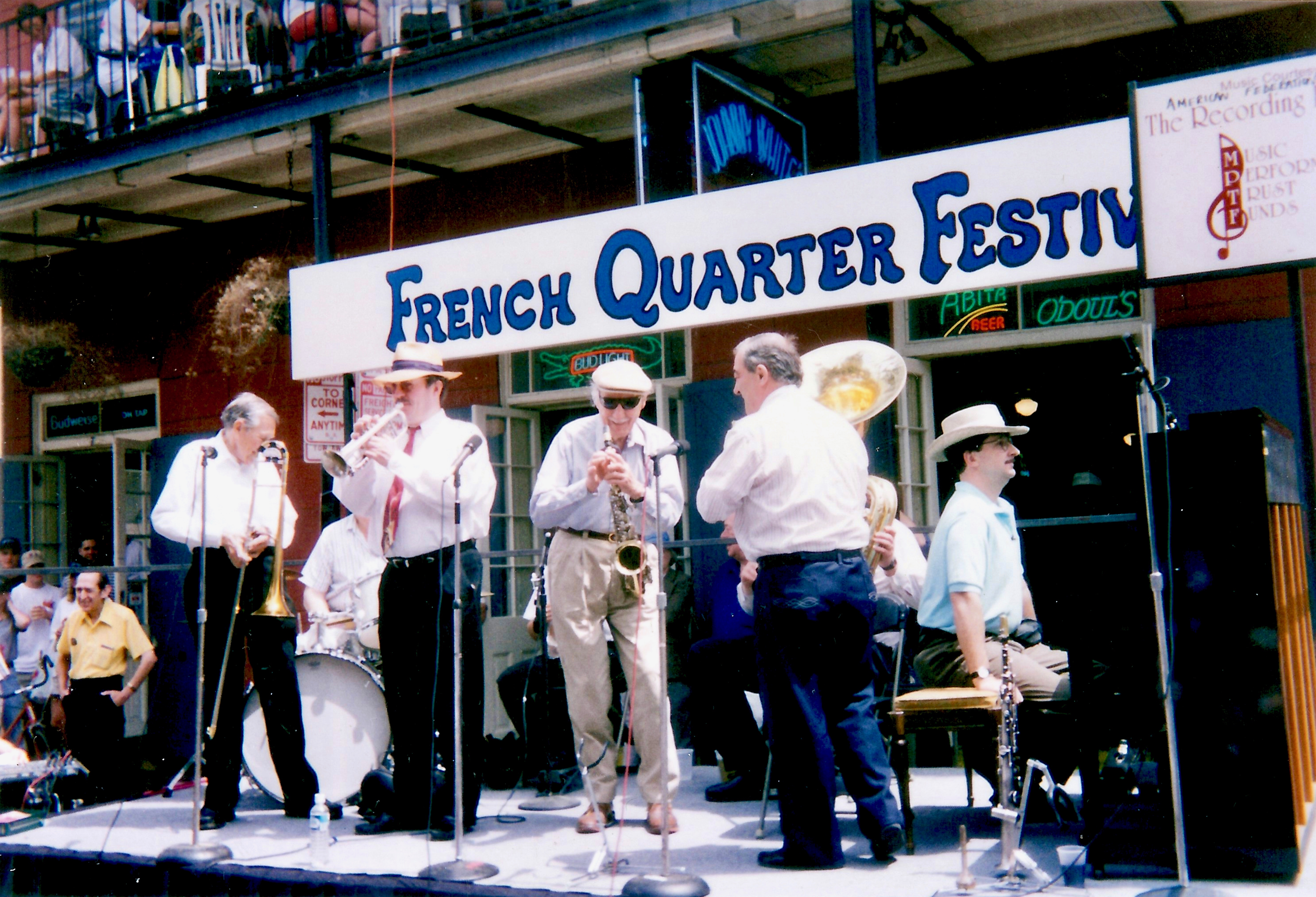
Helm at center on saxophone at French Quarter Festival 1990.

Helm was born in Fairmead, California and began playing brass instruments when he was young. He later turned to alto saxophone and by the age of 11 was a professional tenor saxophonist who also played several other instruments. He met Lu Watters and Turk Murphy in 1935 and began playing with them. Five years in the army were followed by returns to the same leaders. He recorded an album as a leader in 1954. Helm continued to play into the 1990s and in 1994–95 recorded another album, Hotter than That, for Stomp Off. He died in San Rafael, California, on September 1, 2002.
