= Good Time Jazz Records =

American jazz record company and label

- Parent company: Concord Music Group
- Founded: 1949
- Founder: Lester Koenig
- Defunct: 1969
- Status: Inactive
- Genre: Jazz
- Country of origin: U.S.

Good Time Jazz Records was an American jazz record company and label. It was founded in 1949 by Lester Koenig to record the Firehouse Five Plus Two and earned a reputation for Dixieland jazz.

The label produced new releases and reissues, including recordings by Jelly Roll Morton, Burt Bales, Turk Murphy's jazz band, Wally Rose, Luckey Roberts, Willie "The Lion" Smith, Lu Watters, Bob Scobey, Bunk Johnson, Kid Ory, George Lewis, Johnny Wiggs, Sharkey Bonano, Don Ewell, and blues musician Jesse Fuller.

Good Time Jazz was subsumed by Koenig's Contemporary Records. Its last recording was made in 1969. When Koenig died in 1977, the label's catalog was sold to Fantasy Records, which anthologized some of it. It was acquired by the Concord Music Group in 2004 when Fantasy was taken over.
