= Wally Rose =

American jazz musician (1913–97)

Walter "Wally" Rose (October 2, 1913, Oakland, California – January 12, 1997, Walnut Creek, California) was an American jazz and ragtime pianist.

== Career ==
Rose was a mainstay of the jazz scene in San Francisco during the 1940s and 1950s. He was the pianist for Lu Watters's group, the Yerba Buena Jazz Band, for its existence during 1939–50, adding a ragtime component to the group.

Following this, he played with Bob Scobey (1951) and Turk Murphy (1952–54), then did mainly solo work for the rest of his career. He recorded for Jazz Man Records in 1941–42, including well-received versions of "Black and White Rag" and "Temptation Rag". He also recorded several albums for Good Time Jazz, and also recorded for Columbia Records. He made an album in 1982, which was his first release as a leader in 24 years.

== Discography ==
- Ragtime Piano Masterpieces (Columbia, 1953)
- Wally Rose (Good Time Jazz, 1953)
- Cake Walk to Lindy Hop (Columbia, 1955)
- Ragtime Classics (Good Time Jazz, 1958)
- Wally Rose on Piano (Blackbird, 1970)
- Whippin' the Keys (Blackbird, 1971; Delmark, 2008)
- Revisited (Stomp Off, 1982)
- Turk Murphy's San Francisco Jazz, Vol. 2 (Good Time Jazz, 1953, revised 1957)
- Rags-Blues-Joys (Solo Art, 1994)
