= Bob Scobey =

American jazz trumpet player (1915–1976)

Robert Alexander Scobey Jr. (December 9, 1916 – June 12, 1963) was an American jazz trumpet player of traditional or Dixieland music based originally in the San Francisco area and later in Chicago, Illinois. He was born in Tucumcari, New Mexico, and died in Montreal, Quebec, Canada.

== Early life ==
Scobey was born in Tucumcari, New Mexico in 1916 but his family moved to Stockton, California before his first birthday and lived there until 1930. His mother bought him a cornet when he was nine. He practiced enough to be in the school band, but thought he wanted to be a chemist. After his family moved to Berkeley, California in 1930, his high school band director recognized his ability and encouraged him to study with good musicians. He studied with the band director, then with a former member of the Goldman band and then a member of the San Francisco Symphony. After high school graduation in 1934, he decided to be a musician after realizing that musicians made more money than chemists.

== Professional life ==
He began his career playing in dance orchestras, theater pit bands, and nightclubs in the 1930s. In 1938, he joined a band organized by trumpeter Lu Watters to play in Sweet's Ballroom in Oakland, California. Two years later, when Watters organized the traditional jazz band, the Yerba Buena Jazz Band, he joined it. (Yerba Buena was the original name for San Francisco, California.) Except for three and a half years, from 1942 to 1946, when Scobey served in the U. S. Army during World War II, he remained in the band. In addition to Watters and Scobey, the band included Bob Helm, Clancy Hayes, Squire Girsback, Russ Bennett, and Turk Murphy. Jazz critic and producer Nesuhi Ertegun says, "Waters and Scobey, with Turk Murphy on trombone, were to constitute one of the most powerful and exciting brass teams in the history of traditional jazz." The two trumpet players, Watters and Scobey, switched back and forth playing first and second trumpet during this period. In 1946 the reorganized band performed in the Dawn Club in San Francisco, then the next year moved to Hambone Kelly's in El Cerrito across the bay.

In late 1949 he left to lead his own band, Bob Scobey's Frisco Band because he was tired of the volume and regular two-beat rhythm of Watters. Clancy Hayes joined the band to sing and play banjo. Scobey was a natural leader, full of new ideas and new tunes. He was complemented by Hayes, "whose lazy southern charm" defined the band. The collaboration recorded over two hundred tracks, including Hayes' own compositions, such as "Huggin' and a Chalkin'," before he left in 1959 to follow a solo career.

From 1950, the group had a three-year residency at Victor & Roxie's in Oakland, California, where the band "met with instant and rapidly growing public support." The band also started recording on the Good Time Jazz label in April 1950. The Frisco Band was broadcast in 1952 and 1953 on Rusty Draper's television show. In 1953, Louis Armstrong sang with them at the Pasadena Civic Auditorium. In 1953 the band moved to one of the largest nightclubs on the west coast, the Rancho Grande in Lafayette, California, near Berkeley. From 1954-57, African-American blues singer Lizzie Miles recorded and toured with the band.

In 1955, Scobey and his band played dates at San Quentin Prison and at the Rancho Grande in Lafayette, California — a sizable roadhouse with a dance floor. In 1957, he recorded for Verve Records and RCA Victor. An important and successful album for RCA was Bing with a Beat recorded with Bing Crosby in 1957. From early in 1956, he toured colleges and universities and, in 1958, he recorded many of the student favorites in New York, the album College Classics (RCA Victor LPM 1700).

In 1959 Scobey and the band moved to his own club, Club Bourbon Street in Chicago, and toured extensively in the Midwest, Las Vegas, New York, and San Francisco. While touring in 1960, he was reportedly drinking half and half or heavy cream to ease the pain in his stomach.

He died of cancer on June 2, 1963 in Montreal, Canada, where he had gone for an experimental cancer treatment.

== Death ==
Scobey died of cancer in 1963 in Montreal, Canada. His wife Jan produced a biography entitled He Rambled!, and arranged for his band to form again and record some blues songs. She also saw to the reissuing of his albums.

== Sources ==
- Carr, I, Fairweather D, Priestley, P. (2000). Jazz: The Rough Guide. Rough Guides. ISBN 1-85828-528-3
- Ertegün, Nesuhi. (1952). Bob Frisco's Band Part II [Album]. Good Time Jazz.
