= Lu Watters =

American trumpeter and bandleader (1911–1989)

- Born: Lucius Carl Watters; December 19, 1911; Santa Cruz, California, U.S.
- Died: November 5, 1989 (aged 77) Santa Rosa, California, U.S.
- Genres: Jazz, dixieland
- Occupation: Musician
- Instrument: Trumpet
- Years active: 1920s–1950

Lucius Carl Watters (December 19, 1911 – November 5, 1989) was a trumpeter and bandleader of the Yerba Buena Jazz Band. Jazz critic Leonard Feather said, “The Yerba Buena band was perhaps the most vital factor in the reawakening of public interest in traditional jazz on the west coast.”

== Career ==
Watters was born in Santa Cruz, California, United States, on December 19, 1911 and raised in Rio Vista, California. At St. Joseph's military academy in Sacramento, California, he belonged to the drum and bugle corps, where he was chosen "most promising bugler." In 1925, he moved with his family to San Francisco, where he started a jazz band. He taught himself how to arrange music and played trumpet on a cruise ship. He studied music at the University of San Francisco with help from a scholarship, but he dropped out of school to pursue a career.

During the 1930s, he went on tour across America with the Carol Lofner big band. While in New Orleans, he became interested in traditional jazz. Back in California, he assembled jam sessions with Bill Dart, Clancy Hayes, Bob Helm, Dick Lammi, Turk Murphy, and Wally Rose. In 1938, he formed a band that included Hayes, Helm, Squire Gersh, Bob Scobey, and Russell Bennett. The band found steady work at Sweet's Ballroom in Oakland, slipping in pieces of traditional New Orleans jazz into the repertoire until Watters was fired.

In 1939, he established the Yerba Buena Jazz Band to revive the New Orleans jazz style of King Oliver. (Yerba Buena was the first name of San Francisco.)

King Oliver in 1923 played "rich polyphony and rocking but relaxed tempo", without individual solos, also called "collective improvisation". Lester Koenig, the owner of Good Time Records, described it as "the ensemble style, the contrapuntal weaving of improvised melodic lines by clarinet, trumpet, and trombone, with the ensemble a setting for occasional solo breaks and choruses."

He brought in pianist Forrest Browne, who taught the band music by Jelly Roll Morton. Watters wrote music and arrangements to add to the traditional repertoire. The band performed at the Dawn Club in San Francisco, where it "began a phenomenally successful career as America’s first real revivalist band." It went on hiatus in 1942 when Watters entered the U.S. Navy but reunited at the Dawn Club after World War II. After the Dawn closed in 1947, the band started the club Hambone Kelly's in El Cerrito, California. In 1949 the band performed with visiting musicians Kid Ory, James P. Johnson, and Mutt Carey.

After Hambone Kelly's closed, the band broke up in 1950. By 1950, the band had lost two key players, Bob Scobey and Turk Murphy, who had gone on their own. Watters ended the Yerba Vista Jazz Band. The Rough Guide concludes: “(they) had gone about as far as they could go: the revival had been launched worldwide and they had broadcast and recorded regularly for ten years.”

Watters left music and became a carpenter, cook, and a student of geology.

In 1961, a mineral from California was named wattersite in his honor.

In 1963, he came out of retirement to perform with Murphy at an anti-nuclear protest in California to prevent a nuclear plant from being constructed at Bodega Bay. He recorded an album for Fantasy with Rose, Helm, Bob Mielke, and Barbara Dane called Blues Over Bodega. It included the title track and another song named for the San Andreas Fault, which was consistent with his interest in geology.

After this brief return to music, he retired again and in 1959 he was a chef at an institution in Cotati, California.

Lu Watters died on November 5, 1989, in Santa Rosa, California.

== Personnel ==
- Lu Watters – trumpet
- Bob Scobey – trumpet
- Turk Murphy – trombone
- Squire Gersh – tuba
- Dick Lammi – tuba
- Bob Helm – clarinet
- Ellis Horne – clarinet
- Forrest Browne – piano
- Wally Rose – piano
- Russell Bennett - banjo
- Clancy Hayes – banjo
- Harry Mordecai – banjo
- Bill Dart – drums

== Discography ==
During its ten year existence, the Yerba Buena Jazz Band recorded for several small labels.

In 1941 And 1942, the band recorded in San Francisco for the young label Jazz Man Records. Four sessions recorded for Jazz Man Records resulted in 19 released 78 rpm sides.

When the band reorganized in 1946 after World War II it recorded for another new label, West Coast Records. The first seven sessions were held on seven consecutive Monday evenings from April 16, 1946, to May 27 in San Francisco's Avalon Ballroom. The sound went by direct telephone line to a nearby recording studio where the masters were cut. West Coast recorded additional Avalon sessions in September the same year and February the next. The nine sessions resulted in 26 released sides on 78s.

During the fall of 1946, ABC radio broadcast a 15-minute show three times a week at 11:45 p.m. from the Dawn Club. A fan recorded selections of these shows for his personal enjoyment. Sixteen songs from these broadcasts were released on a Fairmont Records LP record in 1973. The same fan also recorded a “This is Jazz” August 16, 1947, radio broadcast featuring the band. “This is Jazz” was a 1947 nationally broadcast radio series. Fairmont also released seven numbers from this broadcast on one side of an LP.

The above are all of the recordings of the band with its original front line of Watters, Scobey, and Murphy.

In 1949 and 1950, after Scobey and Murphy had left the band, several recordings were made at Hambone Kelly's for Norman Granz that resulted in 39 sides that were mostly released on Mercury, and later on Clef, Down Home, and Verve.

In January 1952, Good Time Records bought the masters from Jazz Man Records. It also acquired the masters from West Coast Records. The West Coast Records were reissued on three LPs (12001, 12002, and 12003) in 1954. The Jazz Man masters were also reissued on Good Time LP. In the 1990s, Fantasy Records, which then owned the Good Times catalog, acquired the Fairmont radio recordings. In 1993, Fantasy Records released a four-CD, 96 recordings, set of the Good Times' Yerba Buena recordings. It includes all the band's released sides and several unreleased ones through 1947, except for three recording made from the Avalon Ballroom in February 1947.

In 2001, Giants of Jazz, a label based in Italy, released a CD called San Francisco Style: Lu Watters Yerba Buena Jazz Band: Clancy Hays, vocals, containing 20 of the three dozen sides by the band from December 7, 1949, through the last recordings from mid-1950. By December 1949, both Bob Scobey and "Turk" Murphy had left the band.
