= Turk Murphy =

American jazz trombonist, band leader (1915–1987)

Background information
- Born: Melvin Edward Alton Murphy; December 16, 1915; Palermo, California, U.S.
- Died: May 30, 1987 (aged 71) San Francisco, California, U.S.
- Genres: Traditional jazz, Dixieland jazz
- Occupations: Musician, singer, bandleader
- Instrument: Trombone
- Labels: Good Time Jazz; Verve; Atlantic; GHB; Stomp Off; MPS; Merrymakers; Columbia; Roulette; RCA

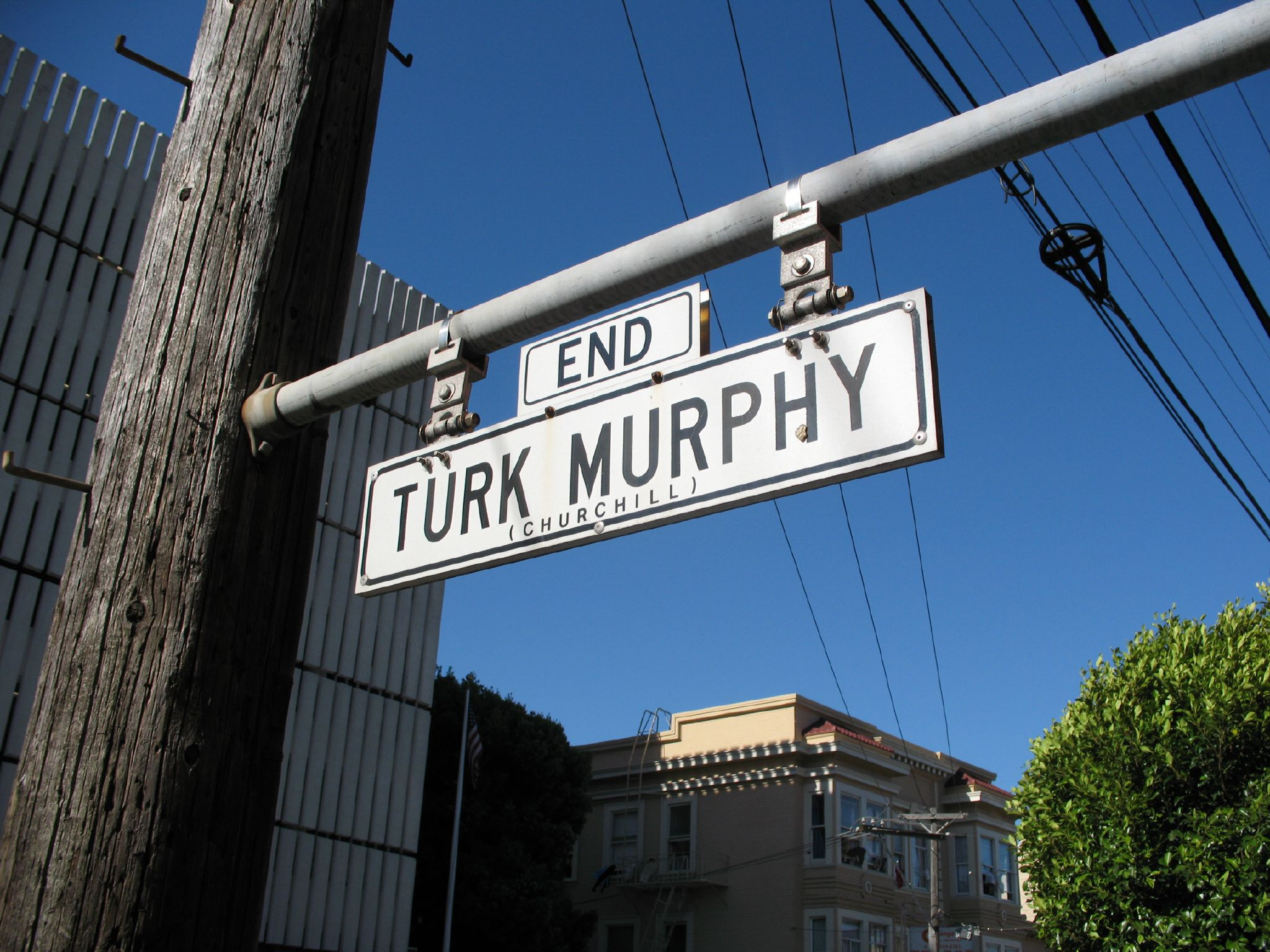
Turk Murphy Lane in San Francisco

Melvin Edward Alton "Turk" Murphy (December 16, 1915 – May 30, 1987) was an American trombonist and bandleader, who played traditional and Dixieland jazz.

== Early life ==
He was born on December 16, 1915, in Palermo, California, United States. He attended Williams High School and graduated in 1933. The building now houses the Sacramento Valley Museum. Murphy was a stutterer, but not when singing or announcing.

== Career ==
From 1937, Murphy was a trombonist for Lu Watters and, in 1940, with Watters' Yerba Buena Jazz Band, formed to play at San Francisco's Dawn Club. Murphy served in the Navy during World War II, during which, he played and recorded with Lu Watters and Bunk Johnson. After the Navy, Murphy continued with Watters.

From Friday the 13th, June 1947, through 1950, Murphy performed with Lu Watters and the Yerba Buena Jazz Band at Hambone Kelly's, a 500-capacity nightclub, the former Sally Rand's Hollywood Club on San Pablo Avenue in El Cerrito, California. A county line bisected Hambone Kelly's. Hambone Kelly's had a front bar in Alameda County and a larger back-room bar in Contra Costa County.

"Turk formed his own band in 1949. They toured nationally with multiple residencies in New York City, making their San Francisco home base the Italian Village club (1952–1954), The Tin Angel (1955–1957), and Easy Street (1957–1959)."

In 1951, Turk Murphy's Jazz Band played at the Beverly Cavern, in Hollywood, Los Angeles for six weeks.

In 1952, Turk Murphy's Jazz Band, included pianist Wally Rose, clarinetist Bob Helm, banjoist Dick Lammi, and tubaist Bob Short.

In April 1959, Turk's band was playing at Easy Street, 2215 Powell.

After Earthquake McGoon's closed, Turk Murphy's Jazz Band performed at the New Orleans Room in the Fairmont Hotel on Nob Hill, San Francisco.

In January 1987, he played Carnegie Hall.

== Earthquake McGoon's ==
Until 1960, Murphy stayed mostly on the road. Then Murphy and pianist Pete Clute opened their nightclub, Earthquake McGoon's, at 99 Broadway, the former Mr. Z's and earlier, Sail'N, which opened in 1960, then moved to 630 Clay Street, operated for sixteen years, moving to 128 The Embarcadero then Pier 39, closing in 1984. KJAZ radio broadcast live from Earthquake McGoon's, at Pier 39, sponsored by See's Candies.

== Television ==
The band appeared on The Ed Sullivan Show twice, in 1959 and 1965. In 1979, Robert Schulz began an eight-year stint with the band. Other notable band members included trumpeters Don Kinch and Leon Oakley; pianists Pete Clute, Don Keeler, and Ray Skjelbred; banjoist Carl Lunsford, tuba and trombonist Bill Carroll, singers Pat Yankee and Jimmy Stanislaw.

Murphy was the singer for the 1971 Sesame Street cartoon shorts, "The Alligator King" and "No. 9 Martian Beauty". They were animated and produced by his friend Bud Luckey. Murphy arranged and performed on many of Luckey's other Sesame Street animated shorts.

== Personal life ==
In 1952, while living in a flat on Chestnut Street, Murphy and Grace broke up.

He was friend of trombonist and Disney animator Ward Kimball, who created many memorable caricatures of Murphy, and Charles Addams, creator of the Addams Family.

He died on May 30, 1987.

== Discography ==
- 1950 San Francisco Jazz, Vol. 1 (Good Time Jazz)
- 1950 In Hollywood
- 1951 San Francisco Jazz, Vol. 2 (Good Time Jazz)
- 1952 Turk Murphy with Claire Austin (Good Time Jazz)
- 1953 Barrelhouse Jazz (Columbia)
- 1954 When the Saints Go Marching In (Columbia)
- 1954 Music of Jelly Roll Morton (Columbia)
- 1955 Dancing Jazz (Columbia)
- 1956 New Orleans Jazz Festival (Columbia)
- 1957 New Orleans Shuffle (Columbia)
- 1957 George Lewis & Turk Murphy at Newport (Verve)
- 1957 Music for Losers (Verve)
- 1958 Turk Murphy at Easy Street (Verve)
- 1958 Live at Easy Street, Vol. 1 (Dawn Club)
- 1959 Turk Murphy at the Round Table (Roulette)
- 1959 Music for Wise Guys and Boosters (Roulette)
- 1962 Let the Good Times Roll
- 1972 In Concert, Vol. 1 (GHB)
- 1972 Turk Murphy and His San Francisco Jazz Band, Vol. 2 (GHB)
- 1972 In Concert, Vol. 2 (GHB)
- 1972 Turk Murphy (GHB)
- 1972 Turk Murphy and His San Francisco Jazz Band, Vol. 1 (GHB)
- 1972 Turk Murphy's Jazz Band (Merrymakers)
- 1973 Frisco Jazz Band, Live! (MPS)
- 1973 The Earthquake McGoon Recordings (Merrymakers)
- 1980 A Natural High (Bainbridge)
- 1986 Concert in the Park (Merrymakers)
- 1986 San Francisco Memories (Merrymakers)
- 1986 Southern Stomps (Lake)
- 1987 Turk at Carnegie (Stomp Off)
- 1995 San Francisco Jazz (Merrymakers)
- 1995 Turk Murphy's San Francisco Jazz Band (Merrymakers)
- 1995 Sentimental Journeys (Merrymakers)
- 1995 Live from the Rathskellar, Vol. 2 (Merrymakers)
- 1995 Live from the Rathskellar, Vol. 1 (Merrymakers)
- 1998 Live at Carson Hot Springs
- 2000 Recorded Live at the Cinegrill: 1950
- 2006 Turk's DeLight (Jasmine)

== Other sources ==
- Richard Cook, Jazz Encyclopedia, London 2007, p. 453
