= Dixieland jazz =

Style of jazz music

Dixieland
- Stylistic origins: Jazz
- Cultural origins: New Orleans, Louisiana, U.S.
- Typical instruments: Cornet; trumpet; trombone; clarinet; tuba; banjo; piano; keyboard; double bass; drums; guitar; vocals

Regional scenes
- New Orleans; Chicago

Other topics
- List of jazz venues; jazz standards; jazz (word)

Dixieland jazz, also referred to as traditional jazz, hot jazz, or simply Dixieland, is a style of jazz based on the music that developed in New Orleans at the start of the 20th century. The 1917 recordings by the Original Dixieland Jass Band fostered awareness of this new style of music.

== History ==
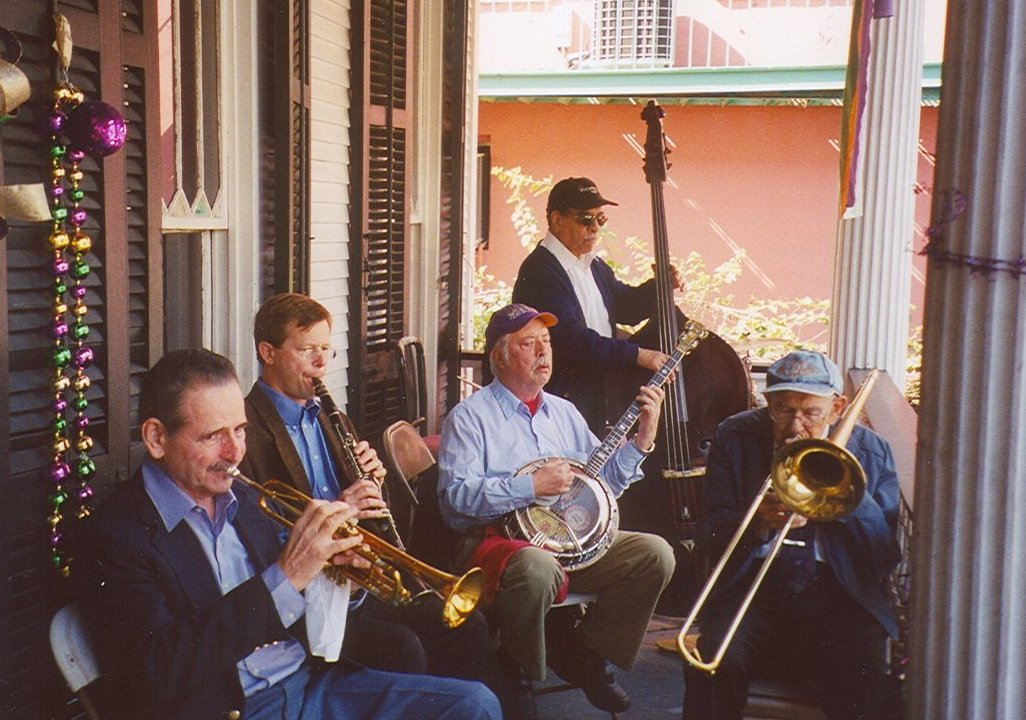
A traditionalist jazz band plays at a party in New Orleans in 2005.

The Original Dixieland Jazz Band, recording its first disc in 1917, was the first instance of jazz music being called "Dixieland", though at the time, the term referred to the band, not the genre. The band's sound was a combination of African American/New Orleans ragtime and Sicilian music. The music of Sicily was one of the many genres in the New Orleans music scene during the 1910s, alongside church music, brass band music and blues.

Much later, the term "Dixieland" was applied to early jazz by traditional jazz revivalists, starting in the 1940s and 1950s. In his book Jazz, the critic Rex Harris defined Dixieland as "Jazz played in a quasi-New Orleans manner by white musicians." The name is a reference to the "Old South", specifically anything south of the Mason–Dixon line. The term encompasses earlier brass band marches, French Quadrilles, beguine, ragtime, and blues with collective, polyphonic improvisation. While instrumentation and size of bands can be very flexible, the "standard" band consists of a "front line" of trumpet (or cornet), trombone, and clarinet, with a "rhythm section" of at least two of the following instruments: guitar or banjo, string bass or tuba, piano, and drums. Louis Armstrong's All-Stars was the band most popularly identified with Dixieland during the 1940s, although Armstrong's own influence during the 1920s was to move the music beyond the traditional New Orleans style.

The definitive Dixieland sound is created when one instrument (usually the trumpet) plays the melody or a recognizable paraphrase or variation on it, and the other instruments of the "front line" improvise around that melody. This creates a more polyphonic sound than the arranged ensemble playing of the big band sound or the straight "head" melodies of bebop.

During the 1930s and 1940s, the earlier group-improvisation style fell out of favor with the majority of younger black players, while some older players continued on in the older style. Though younger musicians developed new forms, many beboppers revered Armstrong and quoted fragments of his recorded music in their own improvisations.

The Dixieland revival in the late 1940s and 1950s was formed in reaction to the orchestrated sounds of the swing era and the perceived chaos of the new bebop sounds (called "Chinese music" by Cab Calloway). Led by the Assunto brothers' original Dukes of Dixieland, a band known for its virtuoso improvisation and recording history's first stereo record, the movement brought semi-retired musicians a measure of fame late in their lives, as well as bringing retired musicians back onto the jazz circuit after years of not playing (including Kid Ory and Red Nichols). Many Dixieland groups of the revival era consciously imitated the recordings and bands of decades earlier. Other musicians continued to create fresh performances and new tunes. In the 1950s a style called "Progressive Dixieland" sought to blend polyphonic improvisation with bebop-style rhythm. Spike Jones & His New Band and Steve Lacy played with such bands. This style is sometimes called "Dixie-bop". Lacy went on to apply that approach to the music of Thelonious Monk, Charles Mingus, Duke Ellington, and Herbie Nichols.

== Etymology ==
"Traditional jazz" can refer to both the early-20th century New Orleans-style of jazz performance, as well as the revivals of the genre seen in post-war American and Britain.

Johnny Stein's Dixie Jass band and The Original Dixieland Jazz Band® are the first two jazz bands to come on to the New Orleans jazz or jass music scene. Jass was eventually replaced with jazz by November 24, 1917 in NYC when The Original Dixieland Jazz Band® recorded music.

== Cultural influences ==
The emergence of Dixieland jazz cannot be understood without considering the socio-cultural environment of New Orleans. The city's unique ecological and social conditions played a role in the production of Dixieland. The fusion of multiple musical cultures and backgrounds including African, European, and Caribbean helped create a musical environment that encouraged a blending of styles. Factors such as population, economic conditions, and social practice shaped the development of Dixieland jazz. Parades such as Mardi Gras and St. Patrick's Day provided spaces for musicians to experiment with new sounds and styles.

The social structure of New Orleans also had a significant impact on the development of jazz. African American communities in New Orleans were not only involved in the creation of jazz but through the shaping of its earliest performances. The community had several gatherings in churches, clubs, or at home that helped foster an informal setting in which musicians could express themselves through creativity.

== Main forms ==
=== Chicago style ===
Dixieland largely evolved into Chicago style in the late 1910s and the new style was popularly called that name by the early 1920s.

"Chicago style" is often applied to the sound of Chicagoans such as Jimmy McPartland, Eddie Condon, Muggsy Spanier, and Bud Freeman. The rhythm sections of these bands substitute the string bass for the tuba and the guitar for the banjo. Musically, the Chicagoans play in more of a swing-style 4-to-the-bar manner. The New Orleanian preference for an ensemble sound is deemphasized in favor of solos. Chicago-style Dixieland also differs from its southern origin by being faster paced, resembling the hustle-bustle of city life. Chicago-style bands play a wide variety of tunes, including most of those of the more traditional bands plus many of the Great American Songbook selections from the 1930s by George Gershwin, Jerome Kern, Cole Porter, and Irving Berlin. Non-Chicagoans such as Pee Wee Russell and Bobby Hackett are often thought of as playing in this style. This modernized style came to be called Nicksieland, after Nick's Tavern, where it was popular, though the term was not limited to that club.

=== West Coast revival ===
The "West Coast revival" is a movement that was begun in the late 1930s by Lu Watters and his Yerba Buena Jazz Band in San Francisco and extended by trombonist Turk Murphy. It started out as a backlash to the Chicago style, which is closer in development towards swing. The repertoire of these bands is based on the music of Joe "King" Oliver, Jelly Roll Morton, Louis Armstrong, and W.C. Handy. Bands playing in the West Coast style use banjo and tuba in the rhythm sections, which play in a two-to-the-bar rhythmic style.

Much performed traditional Dixieland tunes include: "When the Saints Go Marching In", "Muskrat Ramble", "Struttin' with Some Barbecue", "Tiger Rag", "Dippermouth Blues", "Milenberg Joys", "Basin Street Blues", "Tin Roof Blues", "At the Jazz Band Ball", "Panama", "I Found a New Baby", "Royal Garden Blues" and many others. All of these tunes were widely played by jazz bands of the pre-WWII era, especially Louis Armstrong. They came to be grouped as Dixieland standards beginning in the 1950s.

=== Dutch "Old-style jazz" ===
Largely occurring at the same time as the "New Orleans Traditional" revival movement in the US, traditional jazz music made a comeback in the Low Countries. However, most Dutch jazz bands (such as The Ramblers) had since evolved into the swing era, while the few remaining traditional jazz bands (such as the Dutch Swing College Band) did not partake in the broader traditional revival movement, and continued to play ragtime and early jazz. This greatly limited the number of bands aspiring jazz musicians could join (as they were using instruments unavailable to most Dutch musicians such as double basses and the piano), so were forced to improvise, resulting in a new form of jazz ensemble generally referred to "Oude Stijl" ("Old Style") jazz in Dutch.

Influenced by the instrumentation of the two principal orchestral forms of the wind band in the Netherlands and Belgium, the "harmonie" and the "fanfare", traditional Dutch jazz bands do not feature a piano and contain no stringed instruments apart from the banjo. They include multiple trumpets, trombones and saxophones accompanied by a single clarinet, sousaphone and a section of marching percussion usually including a washboard.

The music played by Dutch jazz bands includes original New Orleans tunes and songs of the revival era. In playing style, Dutch jazz bands occupy a position between revivalist and original New Orleans jazz, with more solos than the latter, but without abandoning the principle of ensemble playing. With the average band containing up to 15 players, Dutch jazz bands tend to be the largest ensembles to play traditional jazz music.

== Styles influenced by traditional jazz ==
Musical styles showing influences from traditional jazz include later styles of jazz, rhythm and blues, and early rock and roll. Traditional New Orleans second-line drumming and piano playing are prominent in the music of Fats Domino. The New Orleans drummer Idris Muhammad adapted second-line drumming to modern jazz styles and gained crossover influence on the R&B style of James Brown. Soprano saxophonist Steve Lacy combined New Orleans style polyphonic improvisation with bebop. Bassist Charles Mingus paid homage to traditional jazz styles with compositions such as "Eat That Chicken" and "My Jellyroll Soul". The contemporary New Orleans brass band styles, such as the Dirty Dozen Brass Band, The Primate Fiasco, the Hot Tamale Brass Band and the Rebirth Brass Band, have combined traditional New Orleans brass band jazz with such influences as contemporary jazz, funk, hip hop, and rap. The M-Base (Multi-Basic Array of Synchronous Extemporization) improvisational concept used by ensembles including Cassandra Wilson, Geri Allen, Greg Osby, Steve Coleman, Graham Haynes, Kevin Eubanks and others is an extension of the polyphonic improvisation of New Orleans jazz.

== Revival ==
The Dixieland revival renewed the audience for musicians who had continued to play in traditional jazz styles and revived the careers of New Orleans musicians who had become lost in the shuffle of musical styles that had occurred over the preceding years. Younger black musicians shunned the revival, largely because of a distaste for tailoring their music to what they saw as nostalgia entertainment for white audiences with whom they did not share such nostalgia. The Jim Crow associations of the name "Dixieland" also did little to attract younger black musicians to the revival.

The Dixieland revival music during the 1940s and 1950s gained a broad audience that established traditional jazz as an enduring part of the American cultural landscape, and spawned revival movements in Europe. Well-known jazz standard tunes such as "Basin Street Blues" and "When the Saints Go Marching In" are known even to non-jazz fans thanks to the enduring popularity of traditional jazz. Country Joe McDonald's Vietnam-era protest song "Feel Like I'm Fixin' to Die Rag" is based on tonal centers and incorporates the "B" refrain from the New Orleans standard "Muskrat Ramble". Traditional jazz is a major tourist attraction for New Orleans to the present day. It has been an influence on the styles of more modern players such as Charles Mingus and Steve Coleman.

New Orleans music combined earlier brass band marches, French quadrilles, biguine, ragtime, and blues with collective, polyphonic improvisation. The "standard" band consists of a "front line" of trumpet (or cornet), trombone, and clarinet, with a "rhythm section" of at least two of the following instruments: guitar or banjo, string bass or tuba, piano, and drums. The Dixieland sound is created when one instrument (usually the trumpet) plays the melody or a variation on it, and the other instruments improvise around that melody. This creates a more polyphonic sound than the heavily arranged big band sound of the 1930s or the straight melodies (with or without harmonizing) of bebop in the 1940s.

The "West Coast revival", which used banjo and tuba, began in the late 1930s in San Francisco. The Dutch "old-style jazz" was played with trumpets, trombones and saxophones accompanied by a single clarinet, sousaphone and a section of Marching percussion usually including a washboard.

== Festivals ==
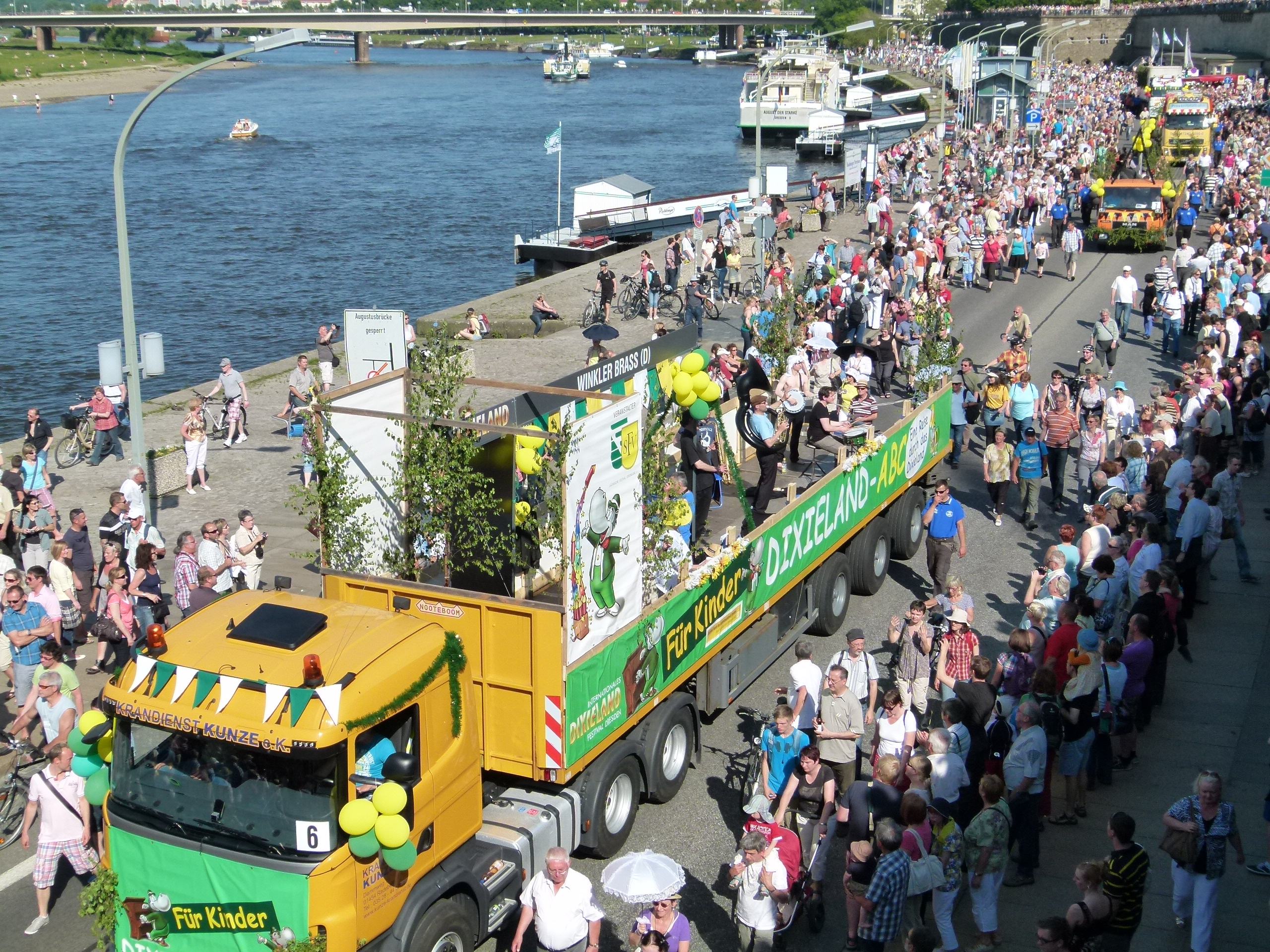
The International Dixieland Festival in Dresden

- In the United States, the largest traditional jazz festival, the Sacramento Jazz Jubilee, was held in Sacramento, California annually on Memorial Day weekend, with about 100,000 visitors and about 150 bands from all over the world. It ended in 2017 after 44 years. Other smaller festivals and jazz parties arose in the late 1960s as the rock revolution displaced many of the jazz nightclubs.
- The New Orleans Jazz & Heritage Festival in New Orleans, Louisiana features jazz and many other genres by local, national, and internationally known artists.
- In Tarragona, Catalonia, the Tarragona International Dixieland Festival (Catalan: Festival Internacional Dixieland de Tarragona), Spain's only dixieland festival, has been held annually the week before Easter, since 1994, with 25 bands from all over the world and 100 performances in streets, theatres, cafés and hotels.
- In Dresden, Germany, a week-long international Dixieland festival has been held every year since 1970, the Internationales Dixieland Festival Dresden. The event culminates in a parade with floats.
- In Davenport, Iowa, the Bix Beiderbecke Memorial Jazz Festival is held on the Mississippi River waterfront each summer celebrating Dixieland music and the life of cornetist Bix Beiderbecke, a 1920s musician from Davenport. It is combined with a prestigious road race, the "Bix 7".
- In Ghent, Belgium, every year during the second week of July there is an international Jazz festival, the Gent Jazz Festival.
- In Weiz, Steiermark, Austria, every year in August the Dixie and Swing Festival includes indoor concerts, a street music festival, and evening jam sessions.

== Periodicals ==
There are several active periodicals devoted to traditional jazz: the Jazz Rambler, a quarterly newsletter distributed by San Diego's America's Finest City Dixieland Jazz Society; The Syncopated Times, which covers traditional jazz, ragtime, and swing; Just Jazz and The Jazz Rag in the UK; and, to an extent, Jazz Journal, an online-only publication based in Europe covering a variety of jazz styles.

== Quotations ==
Arguably the happiest of all music is Dixieland jazz. The sound of several horns all improvising together on fairly simple chord changes with definite roles for each instrument but a large amount of freedom, cannot help but sound consistently joyful.

— Scott Yanow

By the mid-1930s the word 'Dixieland' was being applied freely to certain circles of white musicians. First by the trade press, then by the public. By the end of the decade it all but lost any direct 'Southern' association.

— Richard Sudhalter

== See also ==
- Jazz standard
