= When Icky Morgan Plays the Organ =

- "When Icky Morgan Plays the Organ" by Clark Randall featuring Glenn Miller, Brunswick 7415,1935.

Single by Clark Randall and his Orchestra
- A-side: "Troublesome Trumpet"
- Released: 1935
- Recorded: 1935
- Genre: Big band, jazz
- Length: 2:52
- Label: Brunswick
- Songwriter: Glenn Miller

"When Icky Morgan Plays the Organ" is a 1935 big band and jazz song written by Glenn Miller. The song was released as a 78 single by Clark Randall and his Orchestra on Brunswick.

"When Icky Morgan Plays the Organ" was released as a Brunswick 10 inch 78 single in 1935 as Brunswick 7415 backed with "Troublesome Trumpet".

"When Icky Morgan Plays the Organ" was a novelty song composed and recorded by Glenn Miller in 1935 when he was a member of the Clark Randall Orchestra, which featured Bob Crosby, Gil Rodin, Nappy Lamare, and singer Frank Tennille, the father of Toni Tennille of the Captain and Tennille, whose pseudonym was Clark Randall.

The unique title of the song comes from the "icky" slang expression that Dick Morgan, an eccentric member of the Ben Pollack orchestra, used. Dick Morgan was the banjo and guitar player in the Ben Pollack band, who also used a realistic replica of a python in his act with the Pollack band. George Simon recalled how the song came about: "Glenn composed one of the songs, "When Icky Morgan Plays the Organ, Look Out!" — dedicated to his good friend Dick Morgan, who had played guitar in Pollack's band." Miller recorded ten songs with the Clark Randall orchestra in March, 1935.

The song appears on the 2001 compilation album Bob Crosby and His Orchestra: And Then Some, Parts 1 and 2 of the Complete Discography on Halcyon, HALC 142, and the 2005 compilation series The Glenn Miller Story, Vol. 1-2 on Avid Entertainment. The recording is also on Bob Crosby & His Orchestra. Rarities No. 41, a vinyl LP album, catalogue number 41, which was released on Rarities Records, Copenhagen, Denmark, appearing as "When Icky Morgan Plays His Organ".

== Personnel ==
The personnel on this recording session were: Hilton Nappy Lamare, vocal on side A, "Troublesome Trumpet"; Clark Randall and his orchestra featuring: Clark Randall, vocal on side B, "When Icky Morgan Plays the Organ"; Charlie Spivak, Yank Lawson, trumpet; Glenn Miller, Larry Altpeter, trombone; Matty Matlock, clarinet/alto sax; Gil Rodin, alto sax; Eddie Miller, clarinet/tenor sax; Deane Kincaide, tenor sax; Gil Bowers, piano/organ; Hilton Nappy Lamare, guitar; Pete Peterson, string bass; and Ray Bauduc, drums. The song was recorded in New York City on March 15, 1935. The matrix number is B 17048. The matrix number for "Troublesome Trumpet" is B 17047 so "When Icky Morgan Plays the Organ" was the B side. The song is listed as "Novelty Fox Trot with Vocal Interludes" with the songwriting credit by Glenn Miller.

== Sources ==
- Flower, John. Moonlight Serenade: A Bio-discography of the Glenn Miller Civilian Band. New Rochelle, NY: Arlington House, 1972.
- Rust, Brian. The American Dance Band Discography: 1917-1942. Vols. 1 and 2. New Rochelle, NY: Arlington House Publishers, 1975
- Simon, George Thomas. Glenn Miller and His Orchestra. NY: Crowell, 1974.
- Simon, George Thomas (1971). Simon Says: The Sights and Sounds of the Swing Era, 1935-1955 . New York: Galahad. ISBN 0-88365-001-0.
- Smith, Jay D. Jack Teagarden: The Story of a Jazz Maverick. Cambridge, MA: DaCapo Press, 1988. p. 90.
