= The Boswell Sisters =

Singing trio popular during the Jazz Age (1925–1936)

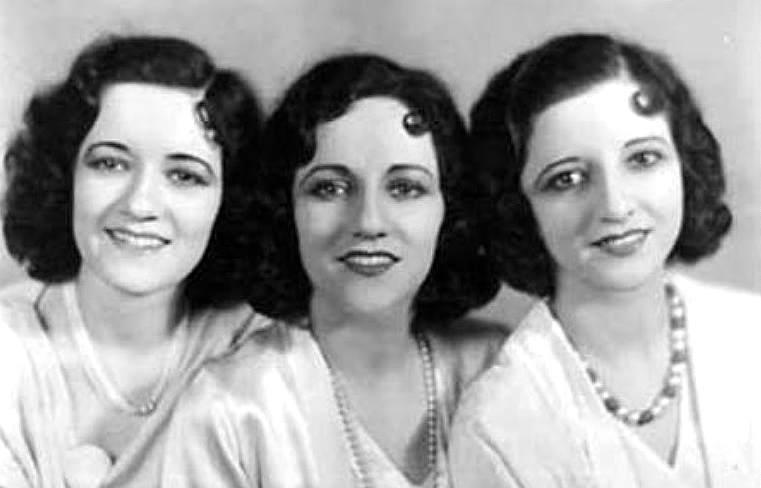
- From left: Vet, Connie and Martha in 1931

Background information
- Origin: New Orleans, Louisiana, U.S.
- Genre: Vocal jazz
- Years active: 1925–1936
- Labels: Victor; Okeh; Brunswick; Decca; Columbia
- Past members: Martha Boswell; Connie Boswell; Helvetia Boswell
- Website: bozzies.com

The Boswell Sisters were an American close harmony singing trio of the jazz and swing eras, consisting of three sisters: Martha Boswell (June 9, 1905 – July 2, 1958), Connie Boswell (later spelled "Connee"; December 3, 1907 – October 11, 1976), and Helvetia "Vet" Boswell (May 20, 1911 – November 12, 1988). Hailing from uptown New Orleans, the group blended intricate harmonies and song arrangements featuring effects such as scat, instrumental imitation, "Boswellese" gibberish, tempo and meter changes, major/minor juxtaposition, key changes, and incorporation of sections from other songs. They attained national prominence in the United States in the 1930s during the twilight of the Jazz Age and the onset of the Great Depression.

After the trio split in 1936, Connie continued as a solo vocalist in radio, film, and later television for an additional quarter century. The trio's "unique singing style and ground-breaking arrangements fused 'blackness' and 'whiteness' in music," and their collaborations with "the preeminent white swing musicians of their day—the Dorsey Brothers, Glenn Miller, Benny Goodman, Joe Venuti and Eddie Lang, Artie Shaw, Victor Young, Bunny Berigan—had a profound effect on the development of the big band sound in the 1930s." When assessing their legacy, scholars claim the Boswell Sisters "made 'real' jazz commercially viable, destigmatizing the music and opening its appreciation to the wider American public."

== Early life and education ==
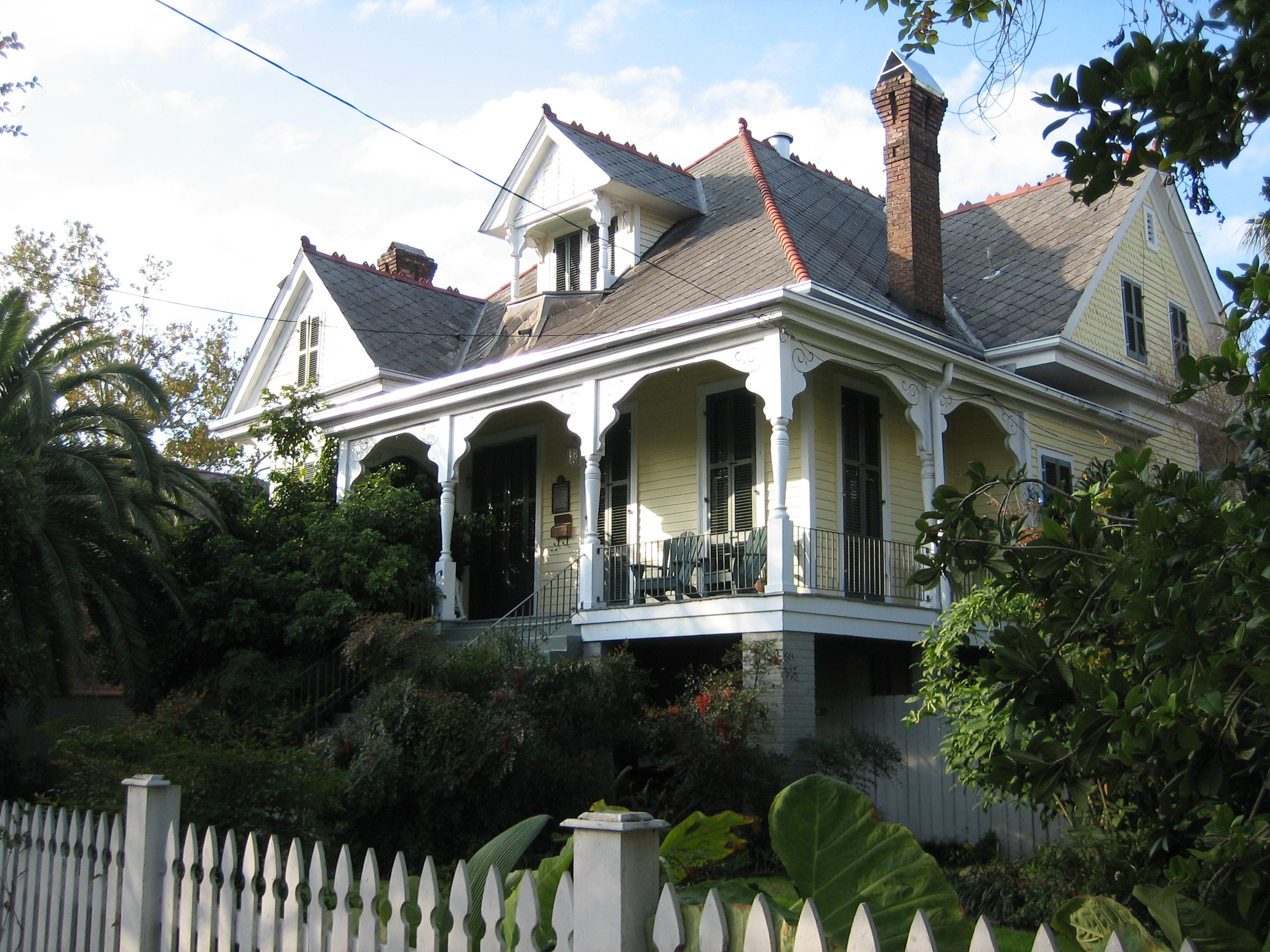
House on Camp Street in uptown New Orleans where the Boswell Sisters grew up

Martha and Connie (Note: Stras 2009, p. 318: "Connie changed the spelling of her name to 'Connee' a few years after embarking on her solo career; various reasons have been put forward for this change, including that she found it difficult and tiring to dot the 'i' when signing autographs, as her right hand and arm were weakened by polio. Family sources maintain that her sister Martha persuaded her to make the change 'for good luck'.") were born in Kansas City, Missouri; Helvetia was born in Birmingham, Alabama. Their parents were manager and former vaudevillian from Indiana Alfred Clyde "A. C." Boswell (1877–1944) and his music-loving wife Meldania George Foore (1871–1947), originally from Missouri. The sisters—along with their 14-year-old brother Clyde Jr. (Clydie)—landed in New Orleans, Louisiana as children in 1914. They were raised in a middle-class family home at 3937 Camp Street. The sisters' parents, their Aunt Mattie, and their Uncle Charlie originally sang as a barbershop quartet. This love of music and singing was passed on to the children.

Martha, Connie, and Vet studied classical piano, cello, and violin, respectively, under the tutelage of Tulane University professor Otto Finck. They performed their classical repertoire in local recitals, often as a trio, but the city's jazz scene swiftly won them over, personally and professionally. "We studied classical music ... and were being prepared for the stage and a concert tour throughout the United States, but the saxophone got us," Martha said in a 1925 interview with the Shreveport Times.

In addition to providing the young Boswells with formal, classical musical education, Meldania Boswell took her children regularly to see the leading African–American performers of the day at the renowned Lyric Theatre. Although Black and White performers and audiences of the period normally were segregated, the Lyric Theatre offered a "Midnight Frolics" program for white-only audiences. There, young Connie heard Mamie Smith, whose "Crazy Blues" (1920), the first blues record performed by an African American, was a hit. Connie later imitated Smith's style on the Boswells' first record "I'm Gonna Cry (Cryin' Blues)," then settled into her own vocal style. Like many middle-class southern households, the Boswell family employed black house servants who, in this musical home environment, were welcome to sing while working, and the girls were known to join in with the singing. Helvetia in particular remembered that their housekeeper, named Aunt Rhea, sang traditional African-American lullabies to her at bedtime. In interviews, the sisters recalled driving around New Orleans listening for new and interesting sounds, which they often found when being outside African–American churches and barrooms of the French Quarter or when listening to street musicians at the French Market. Connie's other primary vocal influence was the legendary Italian opera tenor Enrico Caruso, whom she saw perform at the Athenaeum in New Orleans: "I used to sit and listen and be amazed by his breathing. Then I’d try and do what he was doing. I’d take a long breath and hit a lot of notes."

As their older brother Clydie began breaking away from classical music to study jazz, he introduced his sisters to the syncopated style and to many of the young jazz players in New Orleans. Leon Roppolo (clarinet, guitar), Monk Hazel (drums, cornet), Pinky Vidacovich (clarinet, saxophone), Nappy Lamare (guitar, banjo), Ray Bauduc (tuba, vocals), Dan LeBlanc (tuba), Leon Prima (trumpet), Louis Prima (trumpet, vocals), Wingy Manone (trumpet, vocals), Al Gallodoro (clarinet, saxophone), Chink Martin (bass, tuba, guitar), Santo Pecora (trombone), Raymond Burke (clarinet, saxophone), and Tony Parenti (clarinet, saxophone) were regular guests at the Boswell home. Norman Brownlee and his band were also regular participants in musical evenings at the Boswell home. Reportedly, father A.C. Boswell tried unsuccessfully to limit these visits to just one night per week—with little success. The sisters were particularly influenced by Brownlee's cornetist Emmett Louis Hardy, another friend of Clydie, whose well-documented talent and skill helped shape the sisters' knowledge of jazz harmony, syncopation, and improvisation. Hardy and Clydie both died young and unrecorded, Hardy of tuberculosis at age 22 and Clydie of Spanish flu-related complications at the age of 18.

After becoming interested in jazz, Vet took up the banjo and guitar, and Connie the saxophone and trombone. Martha continued playing the piano but focused on the rhythms and idioms of ragtime and hot jazz.

== Career ==
=== New Orleans ===
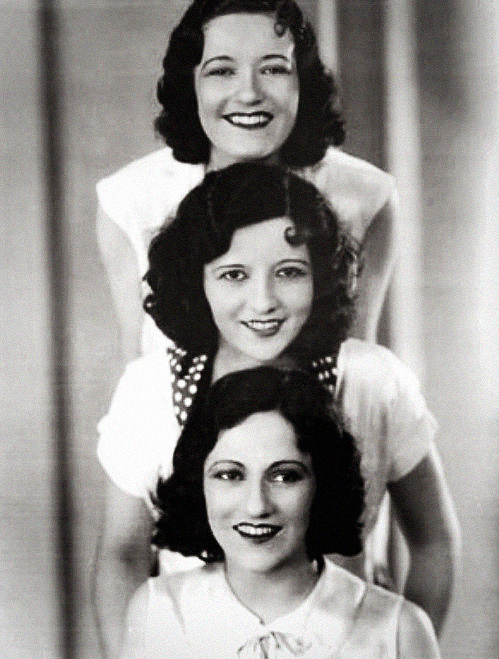
The Boswell Sisters in March 1932. From top: "Vet," Martha, and Connie.

The sisters came to be well known in New Orleans while in their early teens, making appearances in local theaters and on the emerging medium of radio. By the early 1920s, they were performing regularly at local vaudeville theaters, with an act that combined classical, semi-classical, and jazz styles—though, as their popularity increased, the classics faded into the background.

The sisters performed as they would for virtually their entire career: Martha and Connie seated at the piano, with Vet close behind. This arrangement served to disguise Connie's inability to walk, or stand for any length of time, a condition whose source has never been fully confirmed. A childhood bout with polio and a coaster wagon accident are the two main hypotheses, and Connie backed up both of them in various media sources. One theory holds that Meldania crafted the accident story in order to spare her daughter the stigma attached to the disease.

In March 1925, they made their first recording for Victor Records with a mobile recording unit. The session consisted of five songs, three of which were composed by Martha. Victor rejected three of the recordings and accepted "I'm Gonna Cry (Crying Blues)" and "Nights When I Am Lonely" for release (both by Martha). The recording equipment used for this session was the primitive acoustic horn-style of sound capture, which tended to make vocals sound thin and tinny (and so singers were often forced to over compensate by singing at full volume into the horn). At the time of this first recording session Martha was 19, Connie 17 and Vet only 13 years of age. The Boswells would not record again until 1930, instead performing on a succession of vaudeville circuits in the Midwest and later California.

=== West Coast ===
In December 1928, while completing their Midwest vaudeville tour through Arkansas, Texas, and Oklahoma, Connie Boswell was injured and briefly hospitalized, as reported on the front page of the Arkansas City Daily Traveler on Monday, December 10, 1928. The Boswell sisters arrived in San Francisco at the beginning of 1929. They were able to sign with a California vaudeville circuit and start performing again within the week, as advertised in the Napa Valley Register on January 5, 1929. Their next break came when an old New Orleans acquaintance invited the sisters to appear on his weekly radio program at KFWB.

"By 1929 the sisters were living in Los Angeles and had signed a contract with radio station KNX, owned and operated by the Los Angeles Evening Express newspaper and broadcast from the Paramount Pictures studios. The Boswells contributed to sponsored variety programs, such as The Navigator Hour and The Paramount Hour. In 1930 they signed with Warner Brothers Pictures’ station KFWB, which would also play a role in the early careers of Bing Crosby, Ronald Reagan, and, later, the Beach Boys"

This initial exposure led to an opportunity for Martha to perform as a voice actor and singer on Tom Breneman's KNX radio comedy show "Tom and His Mule Hercules", playing Tom's girlfriend "Miss Somaphine". Breneman soon hired the Boswell trio to perform regularly on KNX (broadcast from the Paramount Pictures studios). "Tom and His Mule Hercules" later became known as "Tom and Miss Somaphine", and finally "Radio Periscope" with the continued participation of Martha, and the Boswells as a trio. When later in the year Breneman became programming director for station KFVD he continued to program Boswell trio radio appearances.

Another New Orleans friend by the name of Bobby Burns Berman had opened a restaurant in Hollywood, and invited the Boswell trio to perform at "B.B.B.'s Cellar". The restaurant performances got them noticed by Hollywood entertainment executives. The Boswells began to get "side-miking" work in Hollywood film musicals at this time, singing for other performers in "They Learned About Women" (MGM), "Let's Go Places" (Fox), and "Under Montana Skies" (Tiffany Productions).

As the sisters gained regional notice through their radio appearances, the trio made as many as 50 broadcast transcription recordings for the Continental Broadcasting Corporation, and a selection of these were shipped out for broadcast in Hawaii.

In July 1930, the Boswells made their first disc recordings in almost five years, beginning with two songs recorded for Victor Records in Hollywood. Both featured the Jackie Taylor Orchestra as backing musicians. In October 1930, the Boswells then recorded a total of five songs for OKeh Records accompanied solely by Martha Boswell on piano: Four of the OKeh recordings were issued on two records, and internationally the tracks were paired with jazz recordings by Louis Armstrong and Frankie Trumbauer.

The Boswells received numerous mentions in various radio/stage/screen magazines of the period:

"It really isn't fair to be both beautiful and talented, but nevertheless it goes right on happening as witness this page of fair harmonizers. The Boswell Sisters, with their soft Louisiana accent, began showing promise with Connie, who at seven, played the 'cello in the New Orleans Philharmonic Orchestra. After making Victor records, appearing in vaudeville and moving pictures, the girls have more or less settled down to radio broadcasting from the San Francisco studios to the National Broadcasting Company. Connie shines as a "blues" singer; Martha plays all the accompaniments and sings her part and Vet harmonizes, plays several instruments and doubles for the 'plunk' of a banjo in an amazing manner."
—"What Price Television?" from Radio Doings; The Red Book of Radio, December, 1930, p.18

"GIRLS MADE GOOD
The Boswell Sisters vocal trio starred for some time on KFWB, appeared on the 'California Melodies' program this week, which is released nationally by the Columbia network. The hometowners in New Orleans made it a special Boswell night and stayed home to listen in on the girls who made good in Hollywood." —Fred Yeates, Radioland, August 2nd, 1930

However, the trio's unique approach to arrangements, which often involved reworking melodies and lyrics, altering tempos and keys in mid-song, as well as their improvisational style, did not always garner universal acclamation.

In their inaugural year of radio broadcasting in California, "station employers received letters of opprobrium from outraged listeners voicing disapproval of the sisters' new and unusual arranging and singing styles." One letter stated: "Why don't you choke those Boswell Sisters? How wonderful it would be if they sang just one song like it was written. Really when they get through murdering it, one can never recognize the original." Another outraged letter from an angry listener read: "Please get those terrible Boswell Sisters off the station! You can't follow the melody and the beat is going too rapidly. And to me they sound like savage chanters!"

During this period, the Boswells developed their signature recording technique somewhat by accident. Normally the sisters would sing into a large carbon microphone from a distance of about three feet, but on one particular day there was a problem: Connie was sick with a head cold and couldn't project her voice as usual. They decided to sing together more softly and in a lower register, grouped close around the single microphone. (Note: Crowther, Bruce and Mike Pinfold (1997). Jazz: The Singers and Their Styles. London: Blandford. p. 38. "We were going to cut our transcription one week and I had a terrible cold and couldn't hit the high notes strongly and clearly enough, so Martha covered the piano with burlap, I dropped all the songs … an octave or two and the three of us got very close around the mike and sang, sweet and low, into it. Of course, we had no idea what we sounded like, but the next week we heard the playback and knew we were on to something that no one else was doing."—Connie Boswell)

=== East Coast ===
"...the Boswells left KGO— the flagship station of the NBC Pacific Coast network—in January 1931 to travel to New York where they had landed a 52-week network contract with NBC. They were to appear on several special broadcasts of the Pleasure Hour sponsored by not Chesterfield (that happened for the Boswells the next year and was their longest running commercial program, lasting 10 months) but by Camel cigarettes." —David W. McCain, The King Sisters: A Chapter From the History of Harmony

After moving to New York City in 1931, the Boswell Sisters soon attained national attention and began making national radio broadcasts. The trio had a program on CBS from 1931 to 1933. They soon signed a contract with Brunswick Records and made recordings from 1931 to 1935 under the aegis of producer Jack Kapp. These Brunswick recordings are widely regarded as milestone recordings of vocal jazz. For their Brunswick recordings, "the Boswells took greater liberties, regularly changing style, tempi, modality, lyrics, time signatures and voicings (both instrumental and vocal) to create unexpected textures and effects."

The sisters' reworking of melodies and rhythms of popular songs, and the participation of top New York jazz musicians (including the Dorsey Brothers, Benny Goodman, Bunny Berigan, Fulton McGrath, Joe Venuti, Arthur Schutt, Eddie Lang, Joe Tarto, Mannie Klein, Chauncey Morehouse, Dick McDonough, and Carl Kress), made these recordings unlike any others. Some of the sessions with Dorsey Brothers' band musicians were notable in having the young Glenn Miller writing instrumental arrangements for his bandmates from Connie’s dictation. Melodies were rearranged and slowed down, major keys were changed to minor keys (sometimes in mid-song), and unexpected rhythmic changes were par for the course. The Boswells were among the few performers who were allowed to make changes to current popular tunes since, during this era, music publishers and record companies pressured performers not to alter current popular song arrangements. Connie also recorded a series of more conventional solo records for Brunswick during the same period.

In an interview with CBS Records and Sony Music producer and archivist Michael Brooks, Connie Boswell revealed the often chaotic nature of the New York jazz recording sessions in the early 1930s. (Note: Brooks, Michael (1972). The Boswell Sisters 1932-34 (Liner Notes). Somerville, Massachusetts, USA: Biograph Records. BLP-C3, C 10887. "Most of our Brunswick sessions were cut between midnight and dawn. We’d finish up our show at the Paramount or the Roxy, then go over to Plunkett’s, a tiny bar on 53rd Street about four doors off Broadway frequented by New York studio, pit and dance band musicians and get the Dorseys, Bunny Berigan, Manny Klein, Stan King and the rest of the boys. Then there’d be a sobering-up session while we pumped black coffee into them and we’d finally get to recording. In those days we didn’t have tape but recorded directly onto wax. The boys’d often be juiced and there’d be mistakes galore. Sometimes we’d spoil twenty to thirty waxes before we’d get an acceptable take. That would be labeled Take 'A' and we’d ruin a few more and get to Take 'B' and then so on. I used to write the arrangements and they were pretty tightly scored although I always tried to get a loose, swinging sound and give the boys room to blow. They were just the greatest bunch of fellas to work with: crazy, but all wonderful musicians who understood exactly what we were trying to do and we had a ball, I can tell ya.") But years later, both Connie and Vet spoke with pride about the trio's first session with top-flight New York studio accompanists, after which the musicians stood up to applaud and cheer. "That's a real compliment...when those boys stand." (Note: McCain, David. ""It's the Girl"—The Boswell Sisters with the Dorsey Brothers Orchestra (1931)" (PDF). Library of Congress. Only four months earlier at their very first session for Brunswick (March 19, 1931), a house orchestra composed of Bob Effros (trumpet); Tommy Dorsey (trombone); Jimmy Dorsey (clarinet); Arthur Schutt (piano); Dick McDonough (guitar); Joe Tarto (string bass) and Stan King (drums) had accompanied the Boswell Sisters on “Whad’ja Do To Me?” and “When I Take My Sugar to Tea.” This recording was released as Brunswick 6083. Vet Boswell recalled that after the first run-through of this session, the Boswells received a standing ovation as well as cheers and whistles from “the boys” who accompanied them.)

=== Popular success ===
The Boswell Sisters soon appeared in films during this time. They sang the lively "Shout, Sister, Shout" (1931), written by Clarence Williams, in the 1932 film The Big Broadcast, which featured Bing Crosby and Cab Calloway. (Note: The song was also featured in the television show Boardwalk Empire, Season 5 Episode 5.) The song—one of the sisters' signature tunes—was described in a November 2011 issue of the music magazine Mojo as "by no means as archaic as its age." They sang their 1934 song "Rock and Roll" in the film Transatlantic Merry-Go-Round, bringing with them an early use of the phrase rock 'n' roll, referring in the song to "the rolling rocking rhythm of the sea".

The Boswell Sisters chalked up 20 hits during the 1930s, including the number-one record "The Object of My Affection" (1935). (Of special note is their involvement in a handful of 12" medley/concert recordings made by Red Nichols, Victor Young and Don Redman and their 1934 recording of "Darktown Strutters' Ball", which was issued only in Australia.) They also completed two successful tours of Europe, appeared on the inaugural television broadcast of CBS, and performed on Hello, Europe, the first internationally broadcast radio program.

The Boswell Sisters were among radio's earliest stars, making them one of the first hit acts of the mass-entertainment age. In 1934, the Sisters appeared 13 times on the radio show Bing Crosby Entertains on CBS. They were featured in fan magazines, and their likenesses were used in advertisements for beauty and household products. During the early 1930s the Boswell Sisters, Three X Sisters, and Pickens Sisters were the talk of early radio female harmonizing. The Andrews Sisters started out as imitators of the Boswell Sisters. Young Ella Fitzgerald loved the Boswell Sisters and in particular idolized Connie, after whose singing style she initially patterned her own. (Note: "Who influenced me? There was only one singer who influenced me. I tried to sing like her all the time, because everything she did made sense musically, and that singer was Connie Boswell. When I was a girl, I listened to records by all the singers, white and black, and I know that Connie was doing things that no one else was doing at the time. You don't have to take my word for it, just check the recordings made at the time and hear for yourself.—Ella Fitzgerald)

In 1936, the group signed to American Decca, now headed by their producer Jack Kapp, but after just six single records they broke up. The last recording was made on February 12, 1936 (Irving Berlin's "Let Yourself Go" and "I'm Putting All My Eggs In One Basket"). Approximately one month earlier, Martha Boswell had married Major George L. Lloyd of Britain's Royal Air Force. Connie served as her sister's only attendant at the wedding and Harold J. Warner served as their best man. Lloyd was the managing director of the Aero Insurance Underwriters in New York. and a flying ace of the Great War Connie Boswell continued to have a successful solo career as a singer for Decca. She changed the spelling of her name from Connie to Connee in the 1940s, reputedly because it made it easier to sign autographs. When she tried to become involved with the overseas USO tours during World War II, she was not granted permission to travel overseas because of her disability, so she instead visited hospitalized soldiers and sailors in the U.S. and "did considerable entertaining at Army and Navy posts throughout the country during World War II". Connie and fellow singer Eddie Cantor "were among the original founders of the March of Dimes, and from 1960 on her appearances were limited to benefits for hospitals and other institutions active on behalf of the handicapped".

== Vocal techniques ==
=== Passing harmony ===
The Boswell Sisters approached harmony in a manner different from most vocal groups of the 1920s and 30s. Rather than assign each vocalist to a particular range, such as contralto, alto, soprano, etc., the sisters were comfortable moving unexpectedly across one another's natural ranges. Martha Boswell described it as "a desertion, at various times, of the tones in which we would normally sing", but with the end effect being a "blending" of tones. This idea is supported by a later Vet Boswell comment that "whichever one the note seemed to fit the voice better, we left it that way. We never had a set tenor or alto."

Allowing one another the freedom to choose a different pitch range, in the moment, and basically switch places, became a hallmark of their harmony style. A primary example of the Boswell passing harmony/cross-voicing technique would be the trio's singing on "The Lonesome Road" recorded in 1934.

=== 'Boswellese' gibberish ===
The Boswell Sisters' recording of "Nights When I Am Lonely" for Victor in 1925 was the first recorded instance of what has come to be known as "Boswellese," a gibberish language reportedly created by their father, A.C. Boswell, but taken to a virtuoso level by his daughters. The effect was achieved by inserting "ggled" (pronounced as "guhl-d") after the vowel of a word, with the chosen rhythm determining where the accent should be placed. Probably the clearest example of this technique appears in the trio's version of "Everybody Loves My Baby" from 1932. Essentially the Boswellese chorus substitutes for the expected instrumental break.

"Along with the blackness of their vocal quality, the sisters' musical style incorporated many elements that could be associated with blackness, blues, and hot jazz. 'Boswellese' gibberish, although primarily an effective way of making a straight tune more rhythmically sophisticated, was also alienating and foreign to the listener, redolent of both scat and the 'jive talk' being developed by the alternative black jazz community."

=== Authenticity and a natural tessitura ===
By the beginning of the 1930s, the Boswells plainly differed from their competitors by avoiding caricature or hyper-vocalization in their performances. Both Martha and Connie developed the lower parts of their natural ranges, and the trio sang mostly in their throats and chests rather than relying on the fashionable nasally intonations favored by most white female singers of the day. By sticking to their natural voices and leaving their genuine New Orleans accents intact, the Boswells were able to avoid the introduction of false mannerisms and artificial melodrama into their song renditions:

"...what set the Boswells’ sound apart from that tradition [minstrelsy] was the lack of travesty or hypervocalization, or the necessity for another contextual marker (blackface makeup, black-identified material) to confirm the racial categorization. Furthermore, the Boswells sang with voices that sounded naturally produced; the quality of tone, ornamentation, vibrato, and enunciation was not overly manufactured, and the accent was genuine."

For the American public, the Boswell Sisters' sound contrasted sharply with the popular white singers of the day:

"The radio audience in California could only compare what they heard from the Boswells with known models, and up against the most popular white female voices of the period, the Boswell Sisters were, quite literally, something else. Connie and Martha’s ultra-low tessitura and the sisters’ informal and natural diction contrast sharply with those of the established white sweethearts of stage and screen, such as Ruth Etting, Gertrude Lawrence, and the soon-to-be archetypal Hollywood soprano Jeanette MacDonald."

== Legacy ==
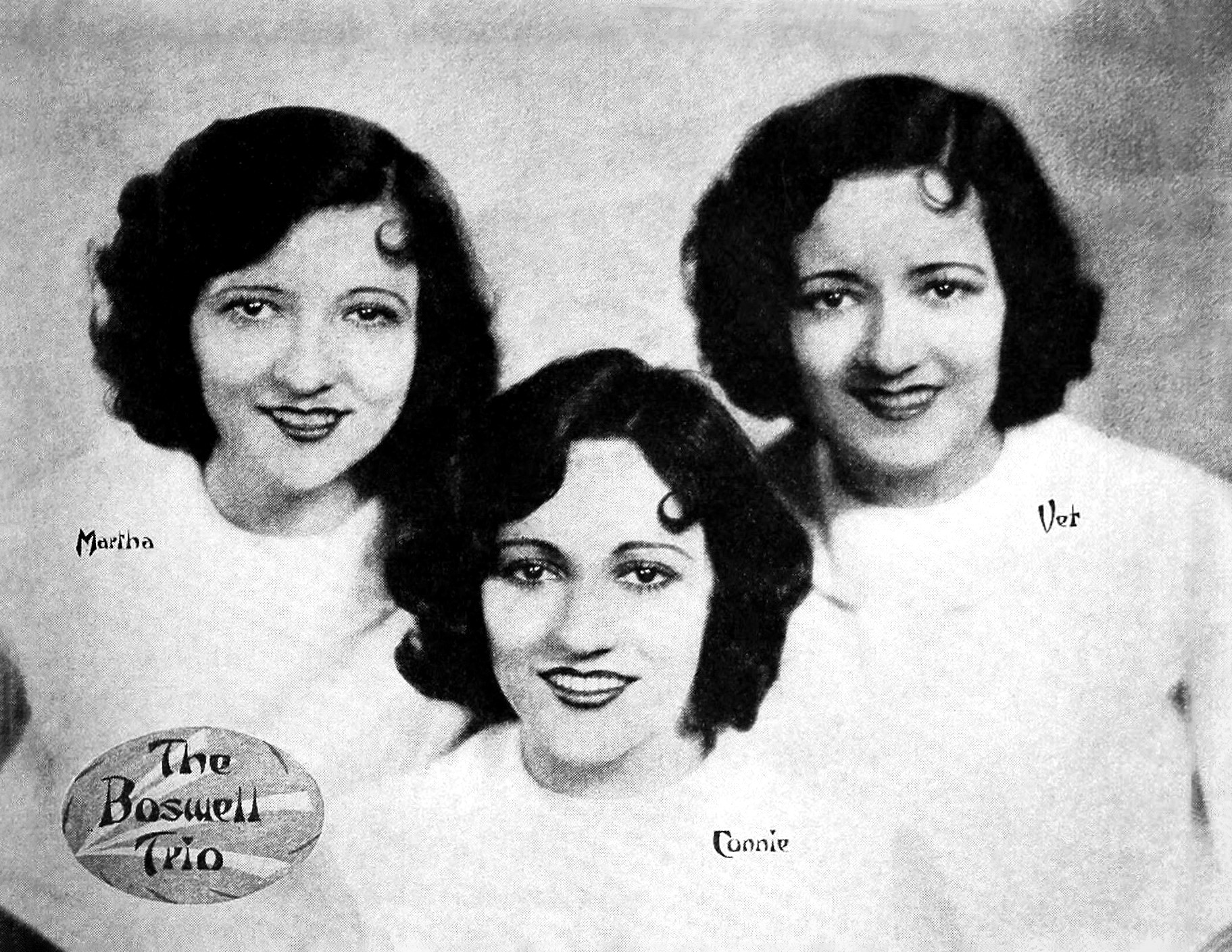
The trio in 1931

Later groups such as the Pfister Sisters, the Stolen Sweets, Boswellmania, the Puppini Sisters, YazooZazz, the Spanish group O Sister!, the Italian trio Sorelle Marinetti, and the Israeli band the Hazelnuts imitated the sisters' recordings. Finnish group Merry Ladies has recorded their arrangements and some of them in Finnish language versions. Finnish broadcasting company YLE published a radio feature by Riina Katajavuori discussing the origins of Boswell Sisters music. Canada's Company B Jazz Band includes many Boswell Sisters arrangements in its repertoire and even created a set saluting the Boswells' appearance in Transatlantic Merry-Go-Round for the cover of their second album, Rock & Roll. The Ditty Bops have covered Boswell Sisters songs in concert. Caffeine Trio from Brazil also claims to have been influenced by them. There is also an Australian group, the Boswell Project, based in Adelaide, South Australia. A London harmony trio, The Haywood Sisters, have also recorded some Boswell Sisters hits and are greatly influenced by their style.

In 2001, The Boswell Sisters, a major musical based on their lives, was produced at the Old Globe Theatre in San Diego. The play starred Michelle Duffy, Elizabeth Ward Land, and Amy Pietz and was produced by the same team that produced Forever Plaid. The show was a hit with audiences and a critical success, but failed to be picked up for a much hoped-for Broadway run.

The Boswell Sisters were inducted into the Vocal Group Hall of Fame in 1998. At a ceremony covered by the Pfister Sisters, the Boswells were inducted into the Louisiana Music Hall of Fame in 2008.

In 2014, Vet's daughter and granddaughter published The Boswell Legacy, the first comprehensive book on the life and times of the influential trio. The same year, the 52-track compilation double-CD Shout, Sister, Shout! was released by Retrospective Records. In his review of the album, Robert Christgau wrote of the Sisters: "They were so prolific and original that except for Billie [Holiday] and their fan Ella they were not just the premier jazz singers of the decade, rewriting melodies at will, but pop stars with a dozen top 10 singles. The Boswells didn’t just imitate instruments when the fancy struck them, they sang as though they were instruments, outswinging both the ‘30s competition and such heirs as Lambert, Hendricks and Ross."

== Hit singles ==
| Year | Single | Chart positions |
| Year | Single | US (Note: Joel Whitburn's methodology for recreating pre-1940s chart positions has been criticized by scholars. As such, this chart should not be taken as definitive.) |
|---|---|---|
| 1931 | "When I Take My Sugar to Tea" | 6 |
| 1931 | "Roll On, Mississippi, Roll On" | 7 |
| 1931 | "I Found a Million Dollar Baby" | 3 |
| 1931 | "It's the Girl" | 9 |
| 1931 | "(With You on My Mind I Find) I Can't Write the Words" | 20 |
| 1931 | "Gems from George White's Scandals" | 3 |
| 1931 | "An Evening in Caroline" | 12 |
| 1932 | "Was That the Human Thing to Do?" | 7 |
| 1932 | "Stop the Sun, Stop the Moon (My Man's Gone)" | 14 |
| 1932 | "Between the Devil and the Deep Blue Sea" | 13 |
| 1934 | "Coffee in the Morning (Kisses in the Night)" | 13 |
| 1934 | "You Oughta Be in Pictures (My Star of Stars)" | 17 |
| 1934 | "Rock and Roll" | 7 |
| 1935 | "The Object of My Affection" | 1 |
| 1935 | "Dinah" | 3 |
| 1935 | "Alexander's Ragtime Band" | 9 |
| 1935 | "St. Louis Blues" | 15 |
| 1935 | "Cheek to Cheek" | 10 |
| 1936 | "I'm Gonna Sit Right Down and Write Myself a Letter" | 3 |
| 1938 | "Alexander's Ragtime Band" (re-issue) | 4 |

== Bibliography ==
- Cave, Mark; Titus, Kyla (2014). Shout, Sister, Shout! The Boswell Sisters of New Orleans (Text panel for the 2014 exhibition). New Orleans: The Historic New Orleans Collection. Archived from the original on December 20, 2014.
- Dunning, John (1998). On the Air: The Encyclopedia of Old-Time Radio. Oxford University Press. ISBN 978-0-19-507678-3.
- Nicholson, Stuart (2014). Ella Fitzgerald: A Biography of the First Lady of Jazz, Updated Edition. Routledge. ISBN 978-1-13-678814-7.
- "The Register: Bulletin of the Tulane University of Louisiana 1917–1918". 19. No. 13. New Orleans: Tulane University. October 1, 1918. pp. 186, 178.
- Sampson, Henry (1980). Blacks in Blackface: A Source Book on Early Black Musical Shows. Metuchen, New Jersey: Scarecrow Press. ISBN 978-0-8108-1318-2.
- Whitburn, Joel (1986). Pop Memories: 1890–1954. Record Research. ISBN 978-0-8982-0083-6.
- Stras, Laurie (2009). "Sing a Song of Difference: Connie Boswell and a Discourse of Disability in Jazz". Popular Music. 28 (3). Cambridge University Press: 297–322. doi:10.1017/S0261143009990080.
- Berkvist, Robert (January 30, 2013). "Patty Andrews, Singer With Her Sisters, Is Dead at 94". The New York Times (National ed.). New York. p. A21.
- "Bridal Set For Today By Martha Boswell". The New York Times. New York. January 1, 1936. p. 36.
- Christgau, Robert (August 12, 2020). "Consumer Guide: August, 2020". And It Don't Stop. Substack.
- "Joel Whitburn Criticism: Chart Fabrication, Misrepresentation of Sources, Cherry Picking". Songbook. March 3, 2013.
- Manilla, Ben (November 11, 2006). "Mamie Smith and the Birth of the Blues Market". All Things Considered.
- "'Saxophones Got Us,' Three Boswells Declare, Reason for Surrendering to Jazz". The Shreveport Times. Louisiana. December 12, 1925. Archived from the original on November 12, 2018.
- Vitty, Cort (February 2012). "The Personal Storm of Connee Boswell". Radio Recall.
