= Norma Teagarden =

American jazz musician

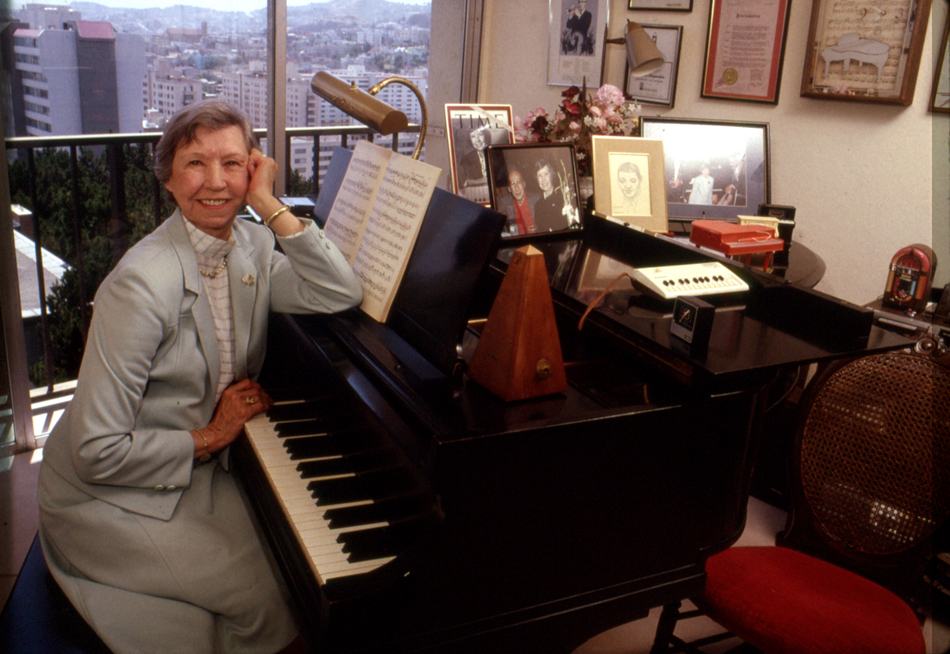
Teagarden at her home in San Francisco, 1989

Norma Louise Teagarden (April 28, 1911 – June 6, 1996) was an American jazz pianist.

She was born in Vernon, Texas, United States, into a musical family that consisted of her mother Helen, who played ragtime piano and taught; her brothers Charlie, a trumpeter, Clois, a drummer, and Jack, a trombonist. She performed with her brother Jack during the 1940s and 1950s.

She performed on piano and violin during the early part of her career, which began in Oklahoma City. In the 1920s, she moved to New Mexico and worked in territory bands, returned to Oklahoma City in the 1930s, and then moved to California in the 1940s. She toured with her brother Jack from 1944 to 1947 and from 1952 to 1955.

Outside the Teagarden family, she worked with Ben Pollack, Matty Matlock, and Ray Bauduc. She eventually settled in San Francisco, where she often performed on solo piano, or with bandleader Turk Murphy.
