= Leo Adde =

American jazz drummer (1904–1942)

- Birth name: Leon Adde
- Born: April 21, 1904; New Orleans, Louisiana, U.S.
- Died: March 1, 1942 (aged 37)
- Genres: Jazz
- Instruments: Drums

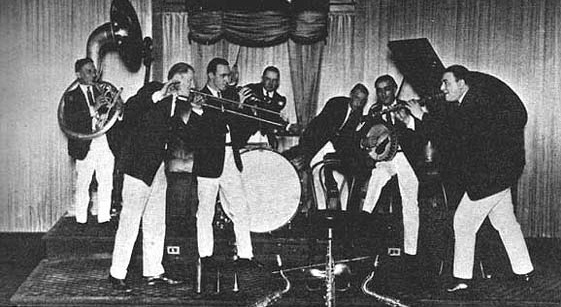
Johnny Bayersdorffer's Jazzola Novelty Orchestra, New Orleans. Left to right: Chink Martin Abraham, brass bass; Tom Brown, trombone; Johnny Bayersdorffer, cornet & leader; Leo Adde, drums; Steve Loyacano, banjo; Nunzio Scaglione, clarinet.

Leon "Leo" Adde (April 21, 1904 – March 1, 1942) was an American jazz drummer.

== Career ==
Adde began by playing the cigar box on percussion, and played as a duo with Raymond Burke on the streets of New Orleans in the mid-1910s. Adde joined the Halfway House Orchestra under Abbie Brunies early in the 1920s, and played in Johnny Miller's New Orleans Frolickers at the end of the decade. Adde also recorded in the 1920s with Johnny Bayersdorffer and with the New Orleans Rhythm Kings.

In the 1930s, Adde drummed with the Melody Masters, led by Sharkey Bonano and Louis Prima's brother Leon Prima. He moved with the ensemble to New York City, where they sometimes performed as the New Orleans Melody Masters. Later in the decade, he recorded with the New Orleans Owls, and returned to New Orleans before the end of the 1930s.
