= Irving Fazola =

American jazz clarinetist

- Birth name: Irving Henry Prestopnik
- Born: December 10, 1912; New Orleans, Louisiana, U.S.
- Died: March 20, 1949 (aged 36); New Orleans, Louisiana, U.S.
- Genres: jazz (dixieland, swing)
- Occupation(s): musician (clarinetist, saxophonist, bandleader)
- Instrument(s): clarinet, saxophone
- Years active: 1927–1949
- Labels: Brunswick; Vocalion

Irving Fazola (December 10, 1912 – March 20, 1949) was an American jazz clarinetist.

== Biography ==
Irving Henry Prestopnik was born in New Orleans, Louisiana, United States. After receiving the nickname "Fazola", he used it as his last name. Influenced in early life by Leon Roppolo, Fazola was playing professionally by age 15. In New Orleans he worked with Sharkey Bonano, Candy Candido, Armand Hug, and Louis Prima. He joined the Ben Pollack band when it came through town and performed with it in Chicago and New York City. After brief time with Glenn Miller and Gus Arnheim, Fazola became a member of the Bob Crosby band in 1938. He achieved some fame with this band, ranking as top clarinetist in the DownBeat magazine polls of 1940 and 1941. After leaving Crosby, he worked in bands in Chicago, New York, and New Orleans, including time with George Brunies at the Famous Door, before settling in New Orleans in 1943. Although musicians told him he could find greater fame and fortune in New York, he told them he felt more comfortable in his hometown with its wonderful food, which he ate in large quantities. According to Pete Fountain, Fazola drank heavily, which contributed to his weight and his early death. He died of a heart attack at the age of 36 in 1949.

Fazola influenced Fountain, whose style resembled Fazola's and who substituted for Fazola at the Opera House the night of his death. Fountain owned one of Fazola's clarinets, but he said the odor of garlic from it was so strong that it was nearly impossible to play. The clarinet was built on the Albert System in which the fingers stretch more than on the Boehm system that Fountain used. The "woody" or "fat" sound of Fountain derived in part from a crystal mouthpiece similar to the one Fazola had used.
