= Gold Drum and Bugle Corps =

Open Class competitive junior drum and bugle corps

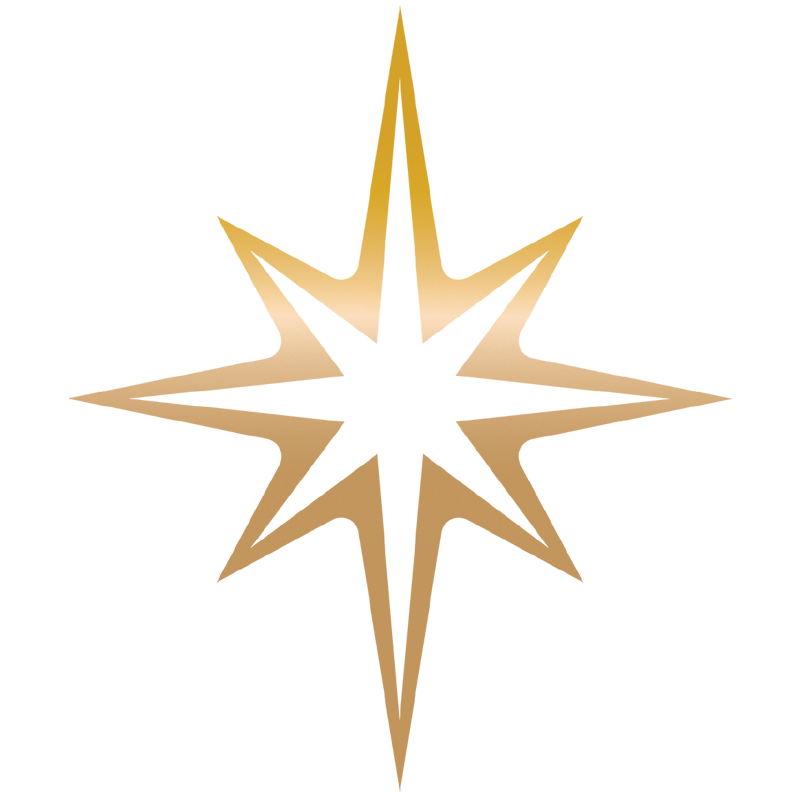
- Location: Oceanside, California
- Division: World Class
- Founded: 2005
- Director: Joe Paul
- Website: golddrumcorps.org

The Gold Drum and Bugle Corps is a World Class competitive drum and bugle corps. Based in Oceanside, California, Gold performs in Drum Corps International (DCI) competitions.

== History ==
The Hawthorne Gold Drum and Bugle Corps was founded in 2005 in Hawthorne, California, by Dr. Donald Flaherty. Dr. Flaherty was the corps' executive director until 2022.

For its first five seasons, the corps competed only within the state of California. In 2010, the corps relocated to Oceanside, in order to be accessible to more of the youth of Southern California and changed its name to Gold Drum and Bugle Corps.

The corps first ventured out of California in 2011, traveling to Salt Lake City for one performance, then on to Loveland and Denver, Colorado for DCI's Drums Along the Rockies regional competitions.

Gold first attended the DCI World Championships in 2007, when DCI traveled west to Pasadena. Since 2012, Gold has traveled to the Midwest to attend the DCI World Championships in Michigan City, Marion, and Indianapolis, Indiana.

In 2013, Gold was joined by students from the Laizhou Martial Arts Institute of Laizhou, China as performers in the corps' show, "East Meets West." The school had been featured performers in the 2008 Beijing Olympics Opening Ceremony.

Gold celebrated its 20th Anniversary in 2025, which also marked the corps' first time joining the DCI Texas Tour at the Southwestern Championship. Following its 20th Anniversary, Gold rebranded, bringing a new look to the organization.

In October 2026, it was announced that Gold was approved to transition into World Class, beginning with the 2027 season.

== Sponsorship ==
The Gold Drum and Bugle Corps is sponsored by Gold Youth Arts Organization, Inc., a 501(c)(3) musical organization. The executive director is Kevin Valentine.

== Show summary (2005–2026) ==
Key
Light blue background indicates DCI Open Class Finalist
Pale green background indicates DCI World Class Semifinalist

Year	Repertoire	World Championships	
Year	Repertoire	Score	Placement
2005	Introductions; Original music by the staff of Gold	Did not attend World Championships	
2006	The Black Widow; Original music by the staff of Gold	Did not attend World Championships	
2007	Spanish Gold; Repertoire unavailable	74.175	9th Place; Division III
2008	29,029 ft: EVEREST; Repertoire unavailable	Did not attend World Championships	
2009	Entomology; Original music by Travis Larson	Did not attend World Championships	
2010	Primary Colors; Yellow, Blue & Red; Original music by Travis Larson	Did not attend World Championships	
2011	Reel to Real; Selections from movie soundtracks	Did not attend World Championships	
2012	Different; Dunkle und Rau, Different & Celebration! Original music by Scott Director	84.300	7th Place; Open Class; Finalist
2012	Different; Dunkle und Rau, Different & Celebration! Original music by Scott Director	66.350	26th Place; World Class
2013	East Meets West; Pingpang, Mínyáo & Zuìzhong; Original music by Scott Director	86.750	6th Place; Open Class; Finalist
2013	East Meets West; Pingpang, Mínyáo & Zuìzhong; Original music by Scott Director	69.960	26th Place; World Class
2014	The Journey; Every Journey Begins With a Single Step; New Places, New People, New Things & One Journey Ends and Another Begins; Original music by Scott Director	74.125	6th Place; Open Class; Finalist
2014	The Journey; Every Journey Begins With a Single Step; New Places, New People, New Things & One Journey Ends and Another Begins; Original music by Scott Director	71.250	28th Place; World Class
2015	Pop Star; Pop Star by Scott Director, Rich Hinshaw & Joe Millea (Based on Toxic by Cathy Dennis, Christian Karlsson, Pontus Winnberg & Henrik Jonback)	67.725	8th Place; Open Class; Finalist
2015	Pop Star; Pop Star by Scott Director, Rich Hinshaw & Joe Millea (Based on Toxic by Cathy Dennis, Christian Karlsson, Pontus Winnberg & Henrik Jonback)	60.525	34th Place; World Class
2016	El Dia De Los Muertos; Processional, The Offering, Celebration & Limbo; Original music by Scott Director	68.600	8th Place; Open Class; Finalist
2016	El Dia De Los Muertos; Processional, The Offering, Celebration & Limbo; Original music by Scott Director	67.638	30th Place; World Class
2017	Grow; The Seed, The Sprout, The Sapling & Maturity; Original music by Scott Director	72.750	7th Place; Open Class; Finalist
2017	Grow; The Seed, The Sprout, The Sapling & Maturity; Original music by Scott Director	70.100	29th Place; World Class
2018	Through Our Eyes; Black and White, Through Our Eyes & Dyslexiaphrenia; Original music by Scott Director	76.750	3rd Place; Open Class; Finalist
2018	Through Our Eyes; Black and White, Through Our Eyes & Dyslexiaphrenia; Original music by Scott Director	75.425	23rd Place; World Class; Semifinalist
2019	The Pursuit of Happiness; Rat Race; Love, Love, Love, Love, Love; Money & Happiness Found; Original music by Scott Director	79.250	3rd Place; Open Class; Finalist
2019	The Pursuit of Happiness; Rat Race; Love, Love, Love, Love, Love; Money & Happiness Found; Original music by Scott Director	77.100	22nd Place; World Class; Semifinalist
2020	Season canceled due to the COVID-19 pandemic		
2021	Speakeasy; Proud Mary by John Fogerty / Dedicated to the One I Love by Lowman Pauling & Ralph Bass / Big Noise From Winnetka by Ray Bauduc & Bob Haggart	No scored competitions	
2022	The Gift; The Sound of Silence by Paul Simon / Ceremony of the Twelve, Hearing Beyond, The Escape & Discovering Beyond by Scott Director	81.900	2nd Place; Open Class; Finalist
2022	The Gift; The Sound of Silence by Paul Simon / Ceremony of the Twelve, Hearing Beyond, The Escape & Discovering Beyond by Scott Director	79.025	20th Place; World Class; Semifinalist
2023	The Hands That Pull the Strings; Symphony No. 1 in C Minor, Op. 68 by Johannes Brahms / Separate Ways (Worlds Apart) by Steve Perry & Jonathan Cain / Russians by Sting & Sergei Prokofiev / It's A Sin by Neil Tennant & Christopher Lowe / Un Nouveau Méchant by Frankie Rice	80.675	2nd Place; Open Class; Finalist
2023	The Hands That Pull the Strings; Symphony No. 1 in C Minor, Op. 68 by Johannes Brahms / Separate Ways (Worlds Apart) by Steve Perry & Jonathan Cain / Russians by Sting & Sergei Prokofiev / It's A Sin by Neil Tennant & Christopher Lowe / Un Nouveau Méchant by Frankie Rice	79.913	20th Place; World Class; Semifinalist
2024	In Memory Of; Un Nouveau Méchant (A New Villain) by Frankie Rice / Everybody Wants to Rule the World by Roland Orzabal, Ian Stanley, & Chris Hughes / Faust Symphony S.108—Part 1—Faust by Franz Liszt / Darkness of Light by Greg Dombrowski / Faust Symphony S.108—Part III—Mephistopheles by Franz Liszt	79.800	3rd Place; Open Class; Finalist
2024	In Memory Of; Un Nouveau Méchant (A New Villain) by Frankie Rice / Everybody Wants to Rule the World by Roland Orzabal, Ian Stanley, & Chris Hughes / Faust Symphony S.108—Part 1—Faust by Franz Liszt / Darkness of Light by Greg Dombrowski / Faust Symphony S.108—Part III—Mephistopheles by Franz Liszt	77.800	21st Place; World Class; Semifinalist
2025	The Demon Barber of Fleet Street; Sweeney Todd, No Place Like London, The Worst Pies in London, My Friends, Not While I'm Around, Johanna (Parts I & II), and Epiphany all by Stephen Sondheim	80.875	2nd Place; Open Class; Finalist
2025	The Demon Barber of Fleet Street; Sweeney Todd, No Place Like London, The Worst Pies in London, My Friends, Not While I'm Around, Johanna (Parts I & II), and Epiphany all by Stephen Sondheim	79.900	20th Place; World Class; Semifinalist
2026	Luminous; Particle VIII (The Light Before the Rain) by Tammy Adams / Without Warning! by Stephen Melillo / Firefly by Ryan George / Someone Like You by Frank Wildhorn / Urban Dances by Richard Danielpour & Zdeněk Mácal / Sun by Thomas Bergersen	80.300	3rd Place; Open Class; Finalist
2026	Luminous; Particle VIII (The Light Before the Rain) by Tammy Adams / Without Warning! by Stephen Melillo / Firefly by Ryan George / Someone Like You by Frank Wildhorn / Urban Dances by Richard Danielpour & Zdeněk Mácal / Sun by Thomas Bergersen	77.975	22nd Place; World Class; Semifinalist
