= Charlie Teagarden =

American jazz trumpeter (1913–1984)

Charlie Teagarden (July 19, 1913 – December 10, 1984), known as 'Smokey Joe', was an American jazz trumpeter. He was the younger brother of Jack Teagarden. His nickname was Little T.

Born in Vernon, Texas, United States, Teagarden worked locally in Oklahoma before he and Jack joined Ben Pollack's Orchestra in 1929. Pollack's recordings were Teagarden's first. He then worked with Red Nichols (1931) and Roger Wolfe Kahn (1932) before doing an extended run in Paul Whiteman's orchestra (1933–40). In 1936 he, Jack, and Frankie Trumbauer played together in the ensemble The Three T's.

Teagarden played in his brother's big band in 1940, but soon branched off to lead his own ensembles. He played with Jimmy Dorsey in 1948-50 and Bob Crosby from 1954 to 1958, as well as working with Pete Fountain in the 1960s. He worked steadily in Las Vegas after 1959. His only release as a leader was issued in 1962 on Coral Records. At the 1963 Monterey Jazz Festival, he performed with Jack, sister Norma, and mother Helen. Teagarden went into semi-retirement in the 1970s.

Teagarden died on December 10, 1984, in Las Vegas, Nevada.
