= Thurman Teague =

American jazz musician (1909-1987)

Thurman Teague (July 21, 1909 – October 15 or 20, 1987 in Los Angeles, California) was an American jazz double-bassist.

Teague first played banjo and guitar, and worked in Chicago with Jack Goss around 1930 as a guitarist; he switched to double-bass after this instrument became more audible on recordings in the electrical recording era. In the 1930s he worked as a bassist with Ben Pollack, Vincent Lopez, Sharkey Bonano, and Santo Pecora, then joined Harry James's orchestra, with whom he played until 1945. After World War II he lived on the West Coast and played with Red Nichols, Jack Teagarden, Frank Sinatra, and Drew Page among others; as a session musician, he played on some 200 recordings.
