= Raymond Burke (clarinetist) =

American jazz clarinetist (1904–1986)

Raymond Burke (né Barrois; 6 June 1904 – 21 March 1986) was an American jazz clarinetist.

== Biography ==
Raymond Burke was born Raymond Barrois on June 6, 1904, in New Orleans, Louisiana. He gave few interviews and believed the life of a musician had little to do with his music.

He was polite, albeit eccentric. He had wavy hair, a thin mustache, and dressed conservatively. He spoke with a thick New Orleans accent and used colorful regional vocabulary, which some found confusing. He did not drink, smoke, or gamble. He is portrayed as unpretentious.

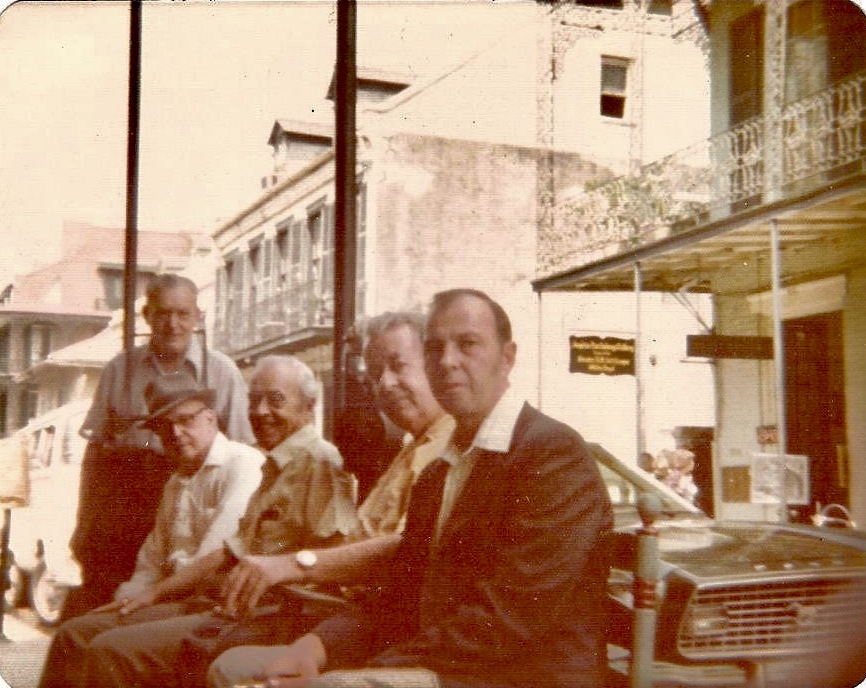
Photo of Raymond Burke (standing) & friends in the French Quarter, 1977

Burke rarely left the city except for out-of-town gigs or tours with the Preservation Hall Jazz Band later in life. His friend and jazz enthusiast Al Rose said Burke spent no more than ten weeks outside of New Orleans. Burke was the nephew of Jules Cassard, a jazz trombonist who played with the Reliance Brass Band, and the cousin of Dixieland musician Harold Peterson.

Burke said that his first instrument was a flute he carved from a fishing pole. He then played the tin whistle, kazoo, and clarinet. His first job in music came in 1913 when he panhandled on the kazoo with future New Orleans Rhythm Kings drummer Leo Adde, who played percussion on a cigar box.

In the 1930s Burke played with The Henry Belas Orchestra (trumpeter Henry Belas, trombonist Al Moore, drummer Joe Stephens, and pianist "PeeWee"); The Melon Pickers (guitarist Henry Walde, bassist John Bell, drummer Al Doria, trumpeter Bill Nauin, and pianist Julius Chevez.) Burke also spent a short period of time in Kansas City for a musical job, but soon returned.

In the 1940s and 1950s he played with Alvin Alcorn, Sharkey Bonano, and frequently in a trio with pianist Jeff Riddick and bassist Sherwood Mangiapane. In the 1960s and 1970s Burke he played with Preservation Hall musicians.

== Rabais Shop ==
According to his colleagues, Burke's only non-musical form of employment was the management of a "Rabais" shop at 906 Bourbon Street. According to friend Al Rose, a Rabais shop is "not as high flown as an antique store nor as disreputable as a junk shop". It is a personal collection that the owner makes semi-available to the public for sale. Burke's shop was in a residential section of Bourbon Street which had light pedestrian traffic and generated very little business. It lacked furniture, except for one wooden stool where Burke sat, and it also lacked electricity, ensuring that the shop closed at sundown.

The shop was filled with old jazz records, historical memorabilia, musical instruments and equipment, books, magazines, and a collection of sheet music. Being dark and cluttered on the inside, the store was not made for browsing. Rather, if a patron had a specific request, Burke would recall whether he had the object in stock, and if so, would have to find it in the collection. Al Rose claims that the store averaged about two dollars of income per day. However, he also argues that the store had another, more musically important purpose. Throughout the work day (from 1pm to sundown) musicians would seek Burke at the Rabais to play with him. These sessions were informal and unattended, consisting of Burke's clarinet and whatever instrument the player(s) had brought. By the end of any given day, Rose estimates that up to a dozen musicians would have stopped by to play with Burke. Among these men were amateurs as well as distinguished musical talent.

== Popularity ==
While Burke was an active musician for most of his life, he did not achieve mainstream popularity or commercial success. He was known for playing modestly, and in large ensembles his clarinet could easily be overpowered. Burke also refused to let contemporary music influence his sound for commercial reasons, and played in what many considered an outdated style. Another possible factor in Burke's obscurity is his association with "Second Line" jazz. Although the term has several different meanings, it has been used to differentiate white musicians who played New Orleans Style jazz from black or Creole musicians. Since New Orleans jazz is typically associated with the African American population in that city, "Second Line" can be used negatively to refer to white musicians who have imitated and simplified this style. Thus, Charles Suhor argues that Burke, as well as other talented white New Orleans Jazz musicians, was neglected throughout much of his early career and not taken seriously.

According to John Steiner, 1939 was an important year for the discovery of Burke's music, as well as for other relatively low key jazz musicians. This year marked the availability of cheap, portable recorders. Jazz enthusiasts would bring these devices to local jam sessions and record their favorite musicians. Among these collectors, recordings were passed around, and Burke's audience increased gradually over the next two decades. As a result, Burke became especially popular with jazz insiders rather than the public. According to Steiner, jazz enthusiasts feared that Burke could become another forgotten jazz great, similar to Buddy Bolden, and so attempted to spread his music.

== Style characteristics ==
Raymond Burke played in the Dixieland style. According to Charles Suhor, Dixieland is characterized by "more conventional tones of wind instruments, rejection of rapid vibratos, greater instrumental facility, and considerable attention to solos, which are routinely 'passed around' in between opening and closing ensemble choruses." Burke's repertoire consisted primarily of old standards.

New York Times reviewer, John S. Wilson claimed that Burke "used mellow, woodsy lower notes to build delightfully catchy little phrases and runs". He also noted that Burke would wriggle around in his seat while playing, and that, during solos, he would play from a strange, semi-crouched position. He also commended Burke's "unhurried" approach. Although Dixieland is often assumed to be a campy imitation of past music, Wilson notes that Burke does not depend on musical stereotypes or clichés. Al Rose also claims that although Burke's music was traditional it was not nostalgic. Instead of imitating the musical style of 1920s jazz, Rose felt that Burke remained an innovative musician who happened to work through that particular style of music.

A concert in 1965 exemplified many of his musical characteristics. This concert brought Burke together with Chicago style pianist Art Hodes. Although the reviewer claims that the group was prone to "ragged endings" and occasional uncertainty and hesitation, he applauds Burke's ability to play with Hodes and feed off his spontaneity. The reviewer notes Burke's economic solo lines and argues that he was a master of spreading out musical ideas. The review asserts that Burke had an excellent handling of the lower register of the clarinet, known as the chalumeau register. Burke would often begin a solo line with an unexpected high note, then proceed down in pitch until he reached this register.

Even within the Dixieland style, Burke's playing was viewed as eccentric. Al Rose claimed that, "He just doesn't play a clarinet part! The tourist expects to hear the really conventional harmony, and Raymond just won't stick to it. He's got all that ingenious counterpoint on his mind—and you know, if it's on his mind, he blows it!"

He refused to play music which he deemed too fast or too slow. He believed that playing music at a fast tempo was showing off and distracted the audience. On the other hand, he also insisted that jazz should not be played too slow, claiming that "the blues ain't funeral music".

Unlike many musicians who became associated with the New Orleans style, he did not flutter or play in an uncontrolled way. He would not sacrifice tone for a crowd-pleasing effect. He was known to stop during a performance and walk offstage if he felt one of his bandmates was pandering to the audience.

== Preservation Hall ==
Preservation Hall was a concert space established in the 1960s which became the center of a revival in New Orleans jazz. In 1961, Icon Records executive Grayson Mills traveled to New Orleans in order to record veteran jazz musicians. Because many of these players were elderly, Mills conceived of Preservation Hall as a place to practice and gain back their skills in front of an audience. Preservation Hall was designed solely for listening to the musicians. The Hall served no food or drinks, had only a few rows of benches for seating, and lacked a dance floor. Donation was the only source of revenue for the club, as admittance was free. Mills hoped that, if the musicians were not worried about appealing to tourists or needy club owners, they would regain their creativity. He became a regular Preservation Hall musician for the rest of his life.

In the mid 1960s, Allan Jaffe assumed management of Preservation Hall and expanded its operations. To ensure the financial survival of the Hall during low tourist seasons, Jaffe began looking at alternative ways for Preservation Hall to maintain an income. He began managing numerous "Preservation Hall Bands", negotiating recording contracts, and sending groups on international tours, even sending Burke to the Soviet Union in 1979.

== Influence ==
According to Al Rose, although Burke is admired by jazz musicians and fans, he has had no influence. Because Dixieland is sometimes considered outdated, there are few players who approach it with the same creativity as Burke. Furthermore, his playing was considered eccentric even within the Dixieland style. For instance, in a Second Line magazine article, Rose recalls suggesting to musician George Girard that he adopt Burke into his band. His response was, "Man, that would be plain heaven, but if I had him I'd still need a clarinet player".

== Sources ==
- Suhor, Charles. Jazz in New Orleans: The Postwar Years Through 1970. Scarecrow Press, Inc. London. 2001. ISBN 978-1461660026
- Rose, Al. Souchon, Edmond. New Orleans Jazz: A Family Album. Louisiana State University Press. Baton Rouge. 1967. ISBN 978-0807111734
- The Emergence of Raymond Burke, Second Line Magazine, Volume 9, 1958
- The Rabais of Raymond Burke Second Line Magazine, Volume 9, 1958
- A Tribute to Raymond Burke Second Line Magazine, Volume 9, 1958
- Wilson, John S. "Jazz Group Carries on an Old Tradition" The New York Times, August 11, 1963.
- Wilson, John S. "New Orleans Recalled." The New York Times. July 7, 1972.
- Wilson, John S. Jazz Fiesta Gets the Beat Slowly. The New York Times. June 9, 1969.
