= Connee Boswell =

American musician (1907–1976)

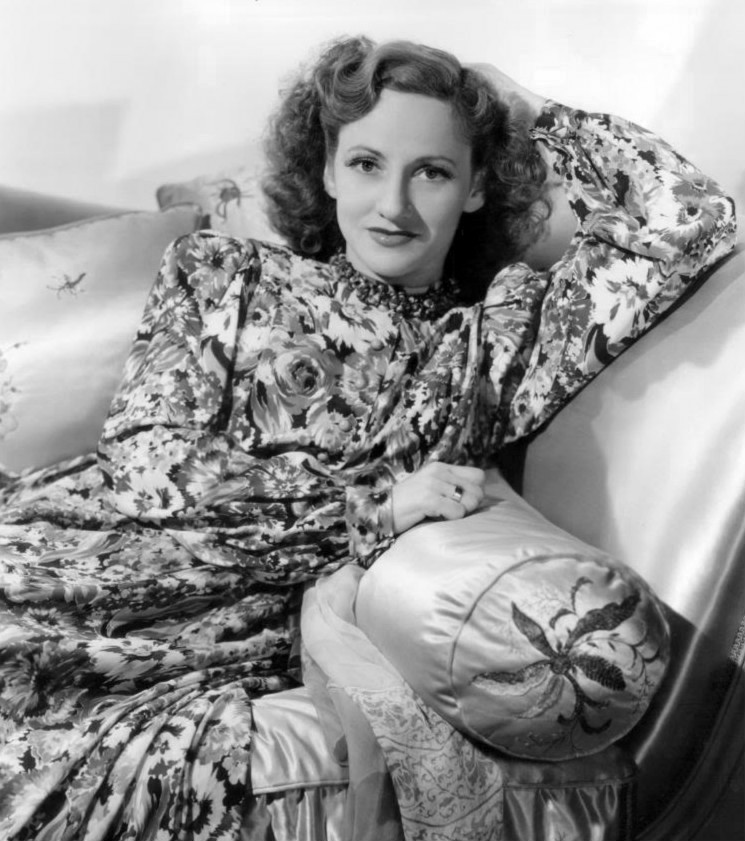
- Boswell in 1941

Background information
- Born: Constance Foore Boswell; December 3, 1907; Kansas City, Missouri, U.S.
- Died: October 11, 1976 (aged 68) Manhattan, New York City, U.S.
- Genre: Jazz
- Occupation: Vocalist
- Instrument: Vocal

Constance Foore "Connee" Boswell (December 3, 1907 – October 11, 1976) was an American vocalist born in Kansas City, Missouri, but raised in New Orleans, Louisiana. With sisters Martha and Helvetia "Vet", she performed in the 1920s and 1930s as the trio The Boswell Sisters. They started as instrumentalists but became a highly influential singing group via their recordings and film and television appearances.

Connee Boswell is considered one of the great female jazz vocalists and was a major influence on Ella Fitzgerald, who said "My mother brought home one of her records, and I fell in love with it...I tried so hard to sound just like her." In 1936, Connee's sisters retired and Connee continued on as a solo artist (having also recorded solos during her years with the group).

== Biography ==
Boswell was born in Kansas City, Missouri. The Boswells came to be well known locally while still in their early teens, making appearances in New Orleans theaters and on radio. They made their first recordings for Victor Records in 1925, which included "Cryin' Blues", wherein Connee is featured singing in the style of her early influence, African-American singer Mamie Smith. The Boswell Sisters became stage professionals that year when they were tapped to fill in for an act at New Orleans' Orpheum Theatre. They received an invitation to go to Chicago and perform in 1928 and honed their act on the Western vaudeville circuit. When their tour ended, they traveled to San Francisco. The hotel that had been recommended had a less than savory reputation, and the man at the desk suggested that the three young ladies might be better off in another hotel. That man, Harry Leedy, part owner of Decca Records, became the sisters' manager on a handshake and later Connee's husband.

The sisters traveled to Los Angeles, where they performed on local radio and "side-miked" for the soundies, including the 1930 production Under Montana Skies. They did not attain national attention, however, until they moved to New York City in 1930 and started making national radio broadcasts. After a few recordings with Okeh Records, they made numerous recordings for Brunswick Records from 1931 to 1935. In addition to the Boswell Sisters recordings for Brunswick, Connee herself was recorded as a solo artist and experienced several successful singles. In 1935, the Boswell Sisters had a No. 1 hit with "The Object of My Affection", the biggest of twenty top 20 records they would enjoy. In 1936, the group signed to Decca Records, but after just three releases called it quits (the last recording took place on February 12, 1936). Connee continued to have a successful solo career as a singer for Decca, but also later recorded for the new Apollo label (1947), RCA Victor (1956), and Decca subsidiary, Design (1958).

In addition to being a co-star on NBC Radio's Kraft Music Hall in 1940–1941, Boswell starred in her own radio show on the NBC Blue Network (later ABC Radio), The Connee Boswell Show, (1944). In 1946 she was featured on CBS Radio's Tonight On Broadway (1946).

Her other guest appearances on radio included The Salute To Irving Berlin/Alexander's Ragtime Band (the feature film), CBS, August 5, 1938; America Calling (appeal for Greek War Relief), February 8, 1941; March of Dimes Special, January 11, 1940; CBC Fourth Annual Victory Loan, May 21, 1943; and "Philco Radio Time", ABC, June 4, 1947.

Boswell also sang in a number of Hollywood films, including It's All Yours (1937), Artists and Models (1937), Syncopation (1942) and Swing Parade of 1946, as well as with the Boswell Sisters in 1932's The Big Broadcast and 1934's Moulin Rouge.

Boswell was interviewed via phone by Bill Fisher on WOWO (Fort Wayne, Indiana). The acetate disk's label contained no date. However, since her then-new Decca single of "Begin The Beguine" was promoted in it, the date should be presumed to be 1952. All through her career with The Boswell Sisters and into the early 1940s, her name was spelled "Connie". She later changed the spelling to Connee. Stories vary as to why she made the change (e.g., because it made it easier to sign autographs or that she felt it was unique and would bring good luck).

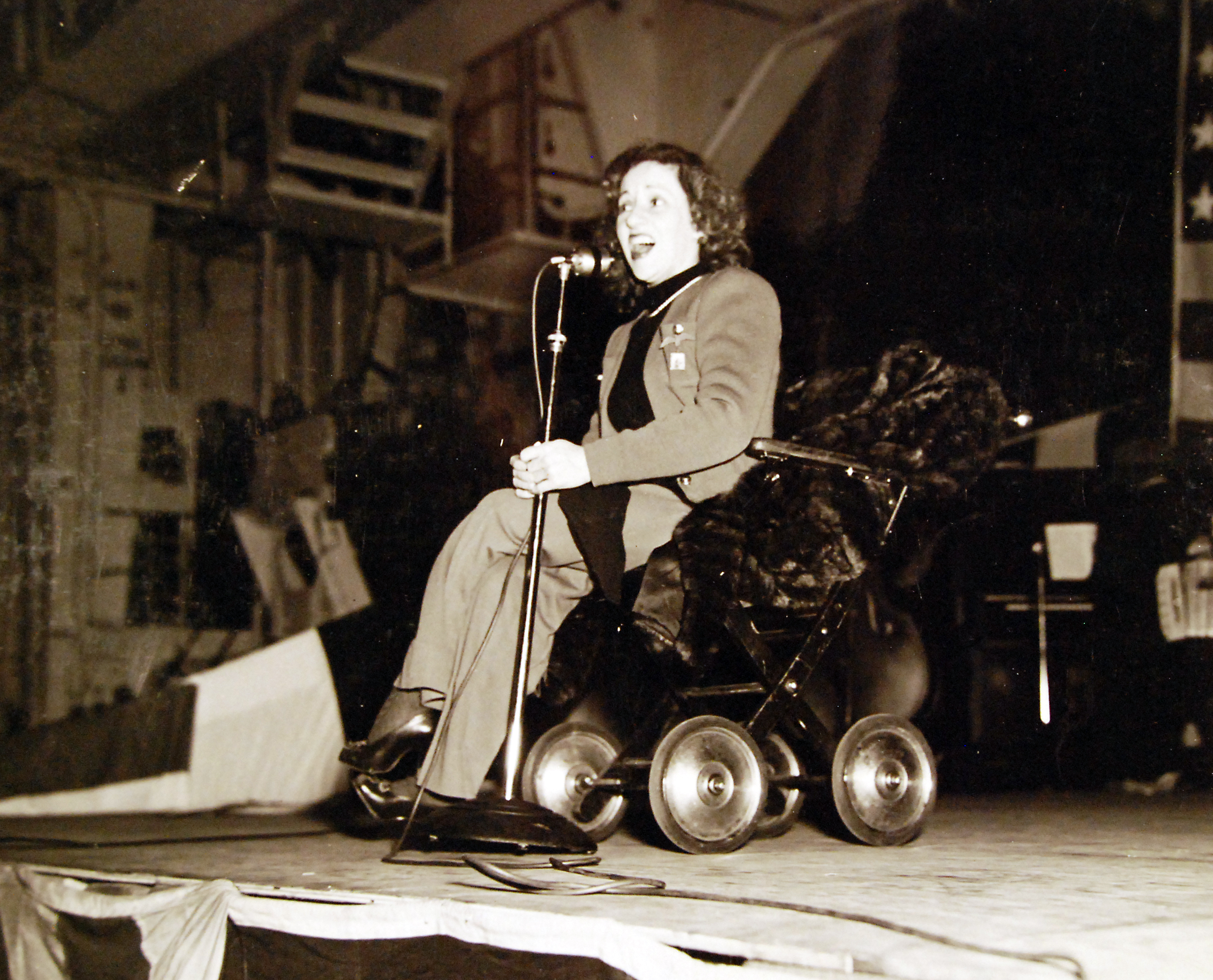
Boswell singing aboard the USS Intrepid (CV-11) in 1944

Boswell sang from a wheelchair—or a seated position—during her career, owing to a childhood bout, aged four, of polio. The general public was not aware of her condition, although Boswell herself did not keep it a secret. During World War II, she tried to get involved with the USO tours, but was not given permission to travel overseas; the Army thought it might not be a morale booster to have a singer who used a wheelchair perform for the troops. She was frequently active in philanthropic efforts to bring awareness and support to those affected by disabilities, including support of the March of Dimes through recordings, personal appearances and television promotional spots.

Boswell was a favorite duet partner of Bing Crosby, and they frequently sang together on radio, as well as recording several hit records as a duo in the 1930s and 1940s. (Crosby and The Boswell Sisters first sang together in 1931 on a 12" medley of songs from the then-current George White's Scandals, issued on Brunswick 20102). She and Crosby recorded a version of "Alexander's Ragtime Band" which was introduced by Eddie Cantor. This recording benefited the National Foundation for Infantile Paralysis, which later became the March of Dimes.

In 1939, Crosby and Boswell had three hit duet records that each climbed into the top 12 on Billboard; "An Apple for the Teacher" climbed all the way to No. 2.

Boswell had several dozen solo hits, including "Moonlight Mood" (1942). Her last charted hit was "If I Give My Heart to You" (1954). Boswell's career slackened in the 1950s, but she still recorded occasionally, and was featured on a number of television broadcasts, including Jazz Party (also known as "Art Ford's Jazz Party") and a regular stint on the 1959 series Pete Kelly's Blues as "Savannah Brown".

== Death ==
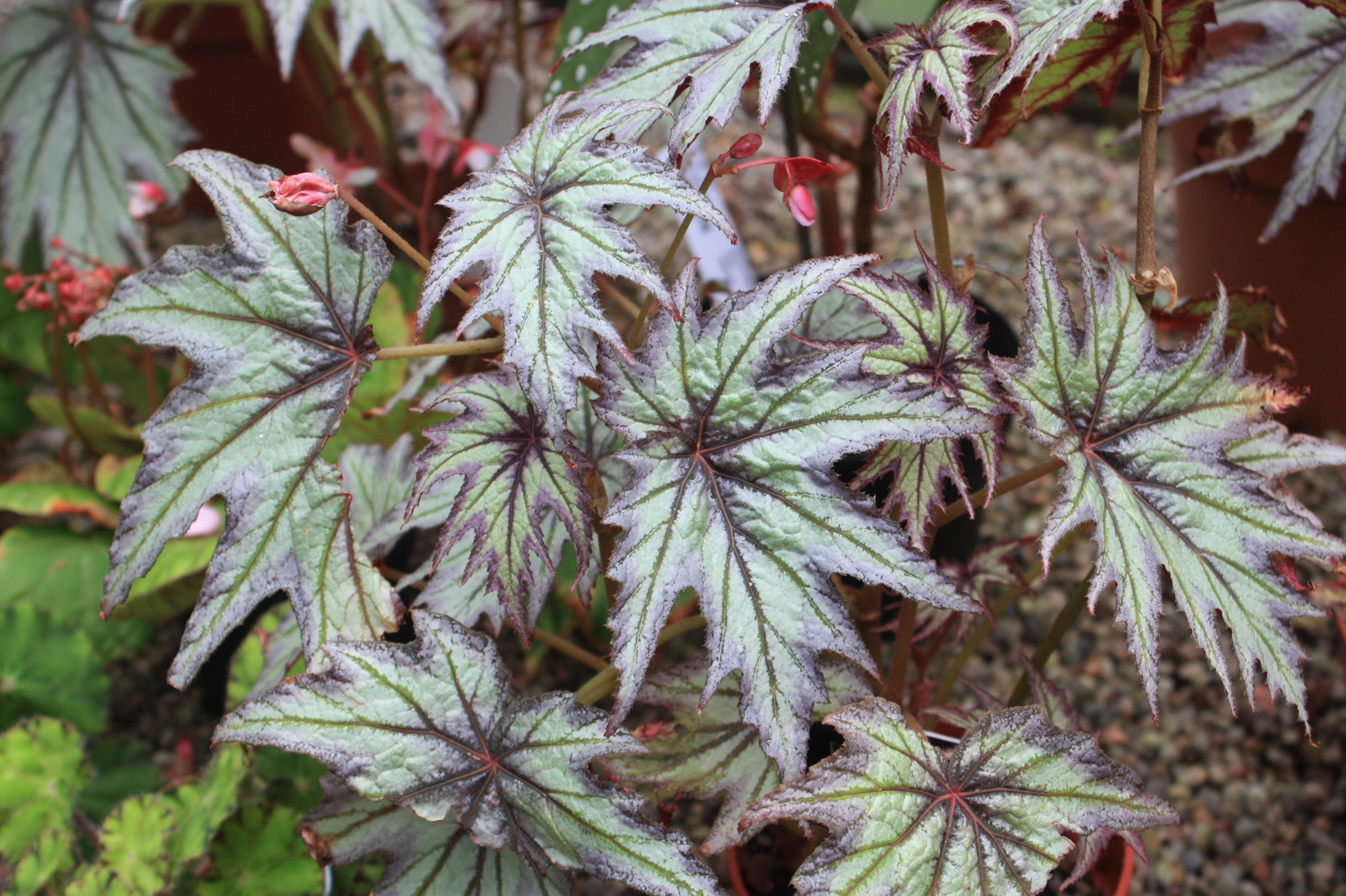
Begonia Connee Boswell

Connee Boswell died on October 11, 1976, from stomach cancer at Mount Sinai Hospital in New York City, at age 68.

She was married to Harry Leedy and had no children. Her life was chronicled in the 2006 documentary short subject Connee Boswell: Life Is a Song, produced by Austin, Texas-based independent filmmaker Randall Riley. The film premiered during the Boswell Sisters Centennial in New Orleans in 2007. The documentary was screened as La Vida es una Cancion in Spain at the Swing Sevilla Festival on April 2, 2016, with Spanish-language subtitles.

== Discography ==
=== Albums ===
- Bing and Connee (Decca, 1952)
- Singing the Blues (Decca, 1953)
- Connee (Decca, 1956)
- Connee Boswell and the Original Memphis Five in Hi-Fi (RCA Victor, 1957)
- The New Sound of Connee Boswell: Sings the Rodgers & Hart Song Folio (Design, 1958)
- Connee Boswell Sings The Irving Berlin Song Folio (Design, 1958)
- An Evening with Connie Boswell (Pickwick, 1989)
- Deep in a Dream (Harlequin, 1996)
- Heart & Soul (ASV Living Era, 1997)
- Moonlight and Roses (Flare, 2001)
- Singing the Blues (Sepia, 2006)

=== Hit singles (solo) ===
Year	Single	Chart positions
Year	Single	US
1932	"Say It Isn't So"	10
1934	"Blue Moon"	--
1934	"Isn't It a Shame"	19
1935	"Moon Over Miami"	19
1936	"On the Beach At Bali Bali"	3
1937	"Whispers In the Dark"	9
1937	"Bob White (Whatcha Gonna Swing Tonight?)"(with Bing Crosby)	1
1937	"Basin Street Blues"(with Bing Crosby)	12
1938	"Fare Thee, Honey, Fare Thee Well"	11
1938	"I Let a Song Go Out of My Heart"	5
1938	"Alexander's Ragtime Band"(with Bing Crosby)	1
1938	"Simple and Sweet"	12
1939	"An Apple for the Teacher"(with Bing Crosby)	2
1939	"Start the Day Right"(with Bing Crosby)	12
1939	"At Least You Could Say Hello"	14
1940	"Between 18th & 19th on Chestnut Street"(with Bing Crosby)	12
1940	"On the Isle of May"	3
1940	"Let's Be Buddies"	25
1941	"Sand in My Shoes"	24
1941	"I'll Keep on Loving You"	22
1942	"South Wind"	21
1942	"Moonlight Mood"	22
1942	"Why Don't You Fall in Love with Me"	21
1946	"Let It Snow! Let It Snow! Let It Snow!"	9
1946	"Who Told You That Lie?"	22
1946	"Ole Buttermilk Sky"	14
1948	"You Were Meant for Me"	19
1952	"My Little Nest of Heavenly Blue"	25
1953	"Singin' the Blues"	27
1953	"Main Street on Saturday Night"	29
1953	"I'm Gonna Sit Right Down and Write Myself a Letter"	29
1954	"The Philadelphia Waltz"	30
1954	"If I Give My Heart to You"	10
