= Nappy Lamare =

American jazz banjoist, guitarist, and vocalist

- Birth name: Joseph Hilton Lamare
- Born: June 14, 1905; New Orleans, Louisiana, U.S.
- Died: May 8, 1988 (aged 82); Newhall, California, U.S.
- Genres: Jazz, Dixieland
- Occupation: Musician
- Instrument: Guitar

Joseph Hilton "Nappy" Lamare (June 14, 1905 – May 8, 1988) was an American jazz banjoist, guitarist, and vocalist.

== Music career ==
Lamare was born in New Orleans, Louisiana, United States. He got his nickname from his friend, Eddie Miller, because he had curly hair. He started playing trumpet, then dropped it for banjo when he was thirteen. Weeks later, he was a member of the Midnight Serenaders. In his teens he worked with Sharkey Bonano, Monk Hazel, and Johnny Wiggs and, in 1925, toured in California with Johnny Bayersdorffer. He recorded for the first time two years later with the New Orleans Owls.

He moved to New York City, playing mostly guitar instead of banjo. He became of a member of the Ben Pollack orchestra and sang on "Two Tickets to Georgia" and “Got the Jitters” in 1933. After Pollack left, Bob Crosby took over the orchestra in 1934, and Lamare remained with him until 1942, performing in records and films, sometimes as a vocalist. After the orchestra dissolved again, he moved to California and spent the rest of his career playing Dixieland as leader of the Louisiana Levee Loungers, then the Straw Hat Strutters in the 1940s and 1950s. The Strutters appeared in the movie Hollywood Rhythm and on the weekly TV variety show Dixie Showboat. While heading the Riverboat Dandies, he injured his pinky finger and played bass guitar for five years until his finger healed.

The latter part of his career he spent in reunions with Bob Crosby, performing at Disneyland, and touring with the World's Greatest Jazz Band. He played guitar, banjo, and sang until his death at the age of 82.

== Discography ==
=== As leader ===
- Hilton "Nappy" Lamare and His Rendezvous Ballroom Orchestra (Fairmount, 1947)
- Riverboat Dandies with Ray Bauduc (Capitol, 1957)
- Two-Beat Generation with Ray Bauduc (Capitol, 1959)

=== As sideman ===
- Bob Crosby, South Rampart Street Parade (GRP, 1992)
- Roy Eldridge, Little Jazz (Columbia, 1989)
- John Fahey, Of Rivers and Religion (Reprise, 1972)
- Bobby Hackett, Coast Concert (Capitol, 1956)
- Johnny Maddox, Dixieland Blues (Dot, 1958)
- Wingy Manone, Wingy Manone Vol. 1 (RCA, 1969)
- Eddie Miller, A Portrait of Eddie (Blue Angel, 1970)
- Jack Teagarden, King of the Blues Trombone (Epic/Columbia, 1963)
