= The Bob Crosby Show (radio program) =

- Country of origin: United States
- Language(s): English
- Syndicates: CBS; Mutual; NBC
- Starring: Bob Crosby; Eileen Wilson; The Pied Pipers
- Announcer: Les Tremayne; John Lund
- Written by: Carroll Carroll; David Gregory; Ben Freedman; John Murray

The Bob Crosby Show can refer to any of several old-time radio musical variety program in the United States. They were broadcast on CBS, Mutual and NBC, with the first beginning in 1935 and the last ending in 1950.

== Format ==
The program focused on music, with Crosby as the star and his Bobcats orchestra providing accompaniment. One of its characteristics was featuring "a different up-and-coming female vocalist" each week. Peggy Lee, Kay Starr and Jo Stafford were among those in that group. Radio historian John Dunning, in his reference book, On the Air: The Encyclopedia of Old-Time Radio, wrote, "The Bob Crosby Show, as such, was a product of the 1940s, but it had its roots in the big band era of the previous decade."

== Personnel ==
Singer/bandleader Bob Crosby was the star of the program, with Johnny Mercer as the host. Other singers included Eileen Wilson and The Pied Pipers. Announcers included Les Tremayne, John Lund and Larry Keating. Writers included Carroll Carroll, David Gregory, Ben Freedman and John Murray.

== Versions ==
The Bob Crosby Show was broadcast as shown in the table below.

Began	Ended	Network	Sponsor
October 25, 1935	January 17, 1936	NBC	Roger & Gallet perfumes
1940	1940	Mutual	sustaining
1940	1940	NBC	sustaining
July 18, 1943	June 25, 1944	NBC	P. Lorillard tobacco products
1944	1945	NBC	sustaining
January 1, 1946	July 17, 1946	CBS	Ford Motor Company

Source: Musicmakers of Network Radio: 24 Entertainers, 1926-1962, except as noted.

== See also ==
- Club Fifteen
