= Martha Boswell =

American jazz singer and pianist (1905–1958)

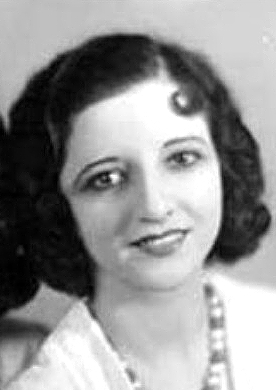
- Boswell in 1931

Background information
- Born: Martha Foore Boswell; June 9, 1905; Kansas City, Missouri, U.S.
- Died: July 2, 1958 (aged 53) Peekskill, New York, U.S.
- Genres: Jazz
- Occupation: Musician
- Spouse(s): Jules L. Picard (divorced) George Lloyd (m. 1936; died 1955)

Martha Foore Boswell Lloyd (June 9, 1905 – July 2, 1958) was an American jazz singer and pianist, and the eldest of the vocal trio the Boswell Sisters. Her younger sisters were Connee and Helvetia "Vet" Boswell.

The Boswell Sisters, who were classically trained musicians, started their career in vaudeville in their native New Orleans. In 1925, they performed on local radio as an instrumental act. Martha played piano, Connee played cello, saxophone, and guitar, and Vet played banjo, guitar, and violin. When they became a vocal act, Connee was the lead vocalist. They began recording in 1925, including singing songs from Hollywood films including Monkey Business starring the Marx Brothers. In 1936, both Martha and Helvetia decided to leave the group for marriage. Their last recording as a group was made on February 12, 1936 (Irving Berlin's "Let Yourself Go" and "I'm Putting All My Eggs In One Basket").

One month earlier, on January 1, 1936, Martha had married Major George L. Lloyd of Britain's Royal Air Force. Her previous marriage to Jules L. Picard ended in divorce. Connee served as her sister's only attendant at the wedding and Harold J. Warner served as their best man. Lloyd was the managing director of the Aero Insurance Underwriters in New York. and a flying ace in the Great War Connee continued to a solo singing career, and appeared in radio, film and television, and made recordings into the 1960s.
