= George Lloyd (RAF officer) =

Rhodesian-born WWI flying ace (1892–1955)

George Lawrence Lloyd
- Born: 1 October 1892; Southern Rhodesia
- Died: 15 July 1955 (aged 62); Peekskill, New York, USA
- Burial place: Hillside Cemetery, Cortlandt Manor, New York; 41°18′59″N 73°53′50″W
- Military career
- Allegiance: United Kingdom
- Branch: British Army; Royal Air Force
- Service years: 1915–1919
- Rank: Major
- Nickname: Zulu
- Units: Staffordshire Yeomanry; No. 60 Squadron RFC; No. 40 Squadron RFC
- Awards: Military Cross; Air Force Cross

Major George Lawrence Lloyd MC, AFC (1 October 1892 – 15 July 1955) was a Rhodesian-born flying ace of the First World War, credited with eight aerial victories.

== Early life and background ==
Lloyd was born in Rhodesia in 1892, which at that time was a chartered territory of the British South Africa Company.

== World War I ==
On 19 November 1915, Lloyd was commissioned as a second lieutenant in the Staffordshire Yeomanry (Queen's Own Royal Regiment), Territorial Force. He was later seconded to the Royal Flying Corps, in which he was appointed a flying officer on 28 February 1917. Lloyd was posted to No. 60 Squadron RFC in April 1917, to fly the Nieuport 17 single seat fighter in operations supporting the Battle of Arras. Inferiority of tactics, technology and training meant that RFC suffered heavy casualties, and the period was subsequently known as "Bloody April". On 22 April, Lloyd gained his first aerial victory, destroying an observation balloon north-east of Boiry-Notre-Dame. On 29 June, between Douai and Estrées, he accounted for two Albatros D.III fighters, one destroyed and the other driven down out of control, and drove down another D.III over Wancourt on 7 July.

Lloyd was promoted to lieutenant in his regiment on 1 July 1917, while remaining seconded to the RFC as a second lieutenant, but was appointed a flight commander with the temporary rank of captain on 6 July, and transferred to No. 40 Squadron RFC, where on 14 July he drove down another D.III east of Douai, for his fifth victory, making him an 'ace'. Further victories followed; he drove down an Albatros D.V three miles east of Lens on 12 August, destroyed an Albatros reconnaissance aircraft over Fromelles on 18 August, and destroyed another D.V at La Bassée on 7 October. His overall tally was a balloon, two Albatros fighters and a two-seater reconnaissance aircraft destroyed, and four Albatros fighters driven down out of control, making him the 12th highest-scoring South African ace of the War.

On 19 November, Lloyd was awarded the Military Cross, which was gazetted on 19 March 1918. His citation read:

Second Lieutenant (Temporary Captain) George Lawrence Lloyd, Yeomanry and Royal Flying Corps.

"For conspicuous gallantry and devotion to duty. Single-handed, he attacked three enemy machines, one of which he brought down out of control. On another occasion he attacked four enemy machines, one of which he brought down in a steep dive. He has brought down many other enemy machines and taken part in numerous combats, displaying magnificent gallantry and skill on all occasions."

On 1 October 1918, only weeks prior to the armistice, he was promoted to the acting rank of major (a squadron commander's rank). On 2 May 1919, Lloyd relinquished his RAF commission on ceasing to be employed. On 3 June 1919, he was awarded the Air Force Cross in recognition of "distinguished services rendered during the war".

== Post-war life ==
After the war, Lloyd emigrated to the United States, where in 1936 he married Martha Boswell (1905–1958), one of The Boswell Sisters, a popular singing trio. Lloyd died in Peekskill, New York, on 15 July 1955.

== Bibliography ==
- Franks, Norman (2000). Nieuport Aces of World War I. Oxford, UK: Osprey Publishing. ISBN 978-1-85532-961-4.
