= Vic Briedis =

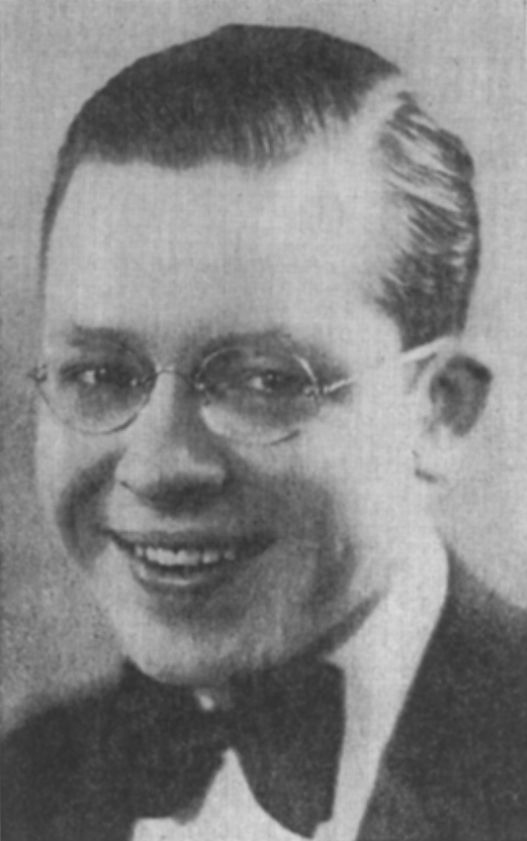
- Vic Briedis in 1928

Background information
- Born: Viktoras Briedis; 1903
- Died: 14 March 1937 (aged 33–34)
- Genres: Jazz; swing; big band
- Occupation: Musician
- Instrument: Piano
- Years active: 1926–1937
- Labels: Warner Bros.

Vic Briedis (Lithuanian: Viktoras Briedis; 1903 – 14 March 1937) was a Lithuanian-American jazz pianist. Briedis collaborated with artists such as Ben Pollack and Glenn Miller.

== Biography ==
Vic Briedis was born in 1903 to Lithuanian immigrants. Other sources mention his birth date as being 1910. It is possible that Briedis and his family first arrived in the United States in 1910. He learned the piano in the Chicago Beethoven Conservatory, the only Lithuanian immigrant music school in the United States. In his youth, Briedis actively participated in events hosted by the local Lithuanian society in Market Park. He soon established himself as a competent orchestra and jazz band pianist. Briedis initially played at the Congress Hotel, the Friar's Inn, and the Cinderella cafe. In 1926 Briedis began collaborating with the Ben Pollack orchestra, for whom he orchestrated work. In 1928 they left for New York City. For some time, Pollack's orchestra played in the Broadway musical Hello, Daddy. In the mornings they played at the Park Central Hotel, while in the afternoons they recorded music in various recording studios.

Briedis recorded numerous records with Pollack's The Park Central Orchestra, Benny Goodman's Boys and others. In 1929 he recorded two pieces with jazz clarinetist Tony Parenti. Only one piece, entitled Old Man Rhythm, was released, and is considered the first jazz recording in Lithuanian history. In 1930, Briedis became a regular accompanist of Hollywood actress and singer Ruth Etting, performing extensively with her and recording albums. He also constantly assisted other actors and singers at the Hollywood Warner Bros. company. In 1936 he published a piece entitled Lazy Rhythm. In 1936, he appeared in the film Cain and Mabel. Briedis edited and orchestrated the music for the film Gold Diggers of 1937. He lived in Hollywood.

Briedis died on 14 March 1937. Doctors attributed the cause of his death to toxic gases from the car he was found in.
