= Bob Crosby =

American singer and bandleader (1913–1993)

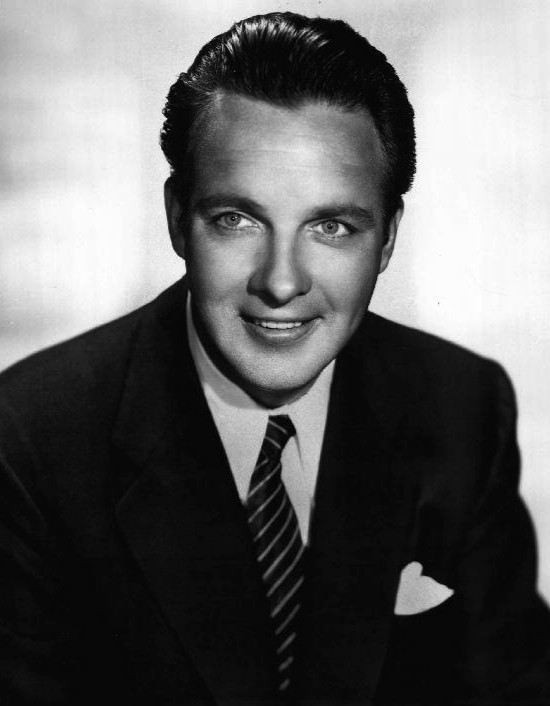
- Crosby in 1953

Background information
- Born: George Robert Crosby; August 23, 1913; Spokane, Washington, U.S.
- Died: March 9, 1993 (aged 79) San Diego, California, U.S.
- Genres: Jazz; swing; big band; Dixieland
- Occupations: Bandleader, singer
- Years active: 1931–1993
- Spouses: Marie Grounitz (m. 1933; div. 1938) June Kuhn (m. 1938)

George Robert Crosby (August 23, 1913 – March 9, 1993) was an American jazz singer and bandleader, best known for his group the Bob-Cats, which formed around 1935. The Bob-Cats were a New Orleans Dixieland-style jazz octet. He was the younger brother of famed singer and actor Bing Crosby. On TV, Bob Crosby guest-starred in The Gisele MacKenzie Show. He was also a regular cast member of The Jack Benny Program, on both radio and television, taking over the role of bandleader after Phil Harris' departure. Crosby hosted his own afternoon TV variety show on CBS, The Bob Crosby Show (1953–1957). During the summer of 1958, he hosted a prime time variety show with the same name on NBC. Crosby received two stars on the Hollywood Walk of Fame, for television and radio.

== Early years ==
Crosby was born in on August 23, 1913, Spokane, Washington, to bookkeeper Harry Lowe Crosby and Catherine "Kate" Harrigan, the daughter of a builder from County Mayo in Ireland.

The couple had seven children: Larry, Everett, Ted, Harry (popularly known as Bing Crosby), Catherine, Mary Rose, and George Robert, popularly known as Bob.

Crosby attended Gonzaga College, but he dropped out to seek a career in music. During World War II, he served in the U.S. Marine Corps, leading a band for much of his time in service.

== Career ==
=== Singer and bandleader ===
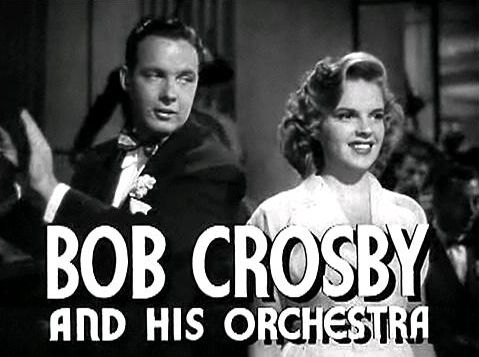
With Judy Garland in Presenting Lily Mars (1943)

Crosby began singing in the early 1930s with the Delta Rhythm Boys, which included vocalist Ray Hendricks and guitarist Bill Pollard, and with Anson Weeks (1931–34) and the Dorsey Brothers (1934–35). He became a bandleader in 1935 after Ben Pollack's band broke up, and many of the former members of that group elected him to lead them. That year, he also recorded with the Clark Randall Orchestra led by Gil Rodin and featuring singer Frank Tennille (a.k.a. Clark Randall). Glenn Miller was a member of that orchestra, and they recorded Miller's novelty composition "When Icky Morgan Plays the Organ." Crosby's own band also formed a "band-within-the-band" called the Bob-Cats, a Dixieland octet including soloists from the larger orchestra, many of whom were from New Orleans. The band included at various times Ray Bauduc, Yank Lawson, Billy Butterfield, Charlie Spivak, Muggsy Spanier, Irving Fazola, Nappy Lamare, Jack Sperling, Joe Sullivan, Jess Stacy, Bob Haggart, Walt Yoder, and Bob Zurke.

In the spring of 1940, during a performance in Chicago, teenager Doris Day was hired as the band's vocalist.

For its theme song, the band chose George Gershwin's song "Summertime." The band's hits included "South Rampart Street Parade," "March of the Bob Cats," "In a Little Gypsy Tea Room," "Whispers in the Dark," "Day In, Day Out," "Down Argentine Way," "You Must Have Been a Beautiful Baby," "Dolores," and "New San Antonio Rose." A bass-and-drums duet between Haggart and Bauduc, "Big Noise from Winnetka," became a hit in 1938–39.

There were reunions in the 1950s and 1960s. During that time there was a revival of interest in big band jazz, and Crosby worked for Disney studios and toured the midwest.

Bob Haggart and Yank Lawson organized a band that combined dixieland and swing to try to carry on the legacy of Bob Crosby. From the late 1960s until the mid-1970s, the band was known as the World's Greatest Jazz Band, but when both became dissatisfied with the name they changed it to the Lawson-Haggart Jazz Band.

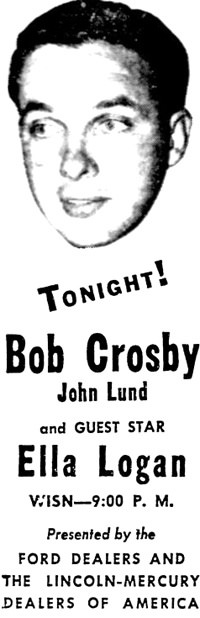
A poster of Bob's show with Ella Logan

=== Radio ===
During World War II, Bob Crosby spent 18 months in the Marines touring with bands in the Pacific. His radio variety series, The Bob Crosby Show, aired on NBC and CBS in different runs from July 18, 1943, to July 16, 1950. This was followed by Club Fifteen on CBS from 1947 through 1953 minus a brief interlude when he was replaced as host by singer Dick Haymes during parts of 1949 and 1950. During his stint on Club Fifteen, he was teamed with the ever-popular Andrews Sisters three nights per week, singing with them and engaging in comedy skits. He first met the trio in 1938 when his orchestra backed their Decca recording of "Begin the Beguine," their popular vocalization of Artie Shaw's big band hit. One can't help when hearing these old Club Fifteen broadcasts how eerily similar Bob and the Andrews Sisters sound to the trio's very frequent and hugely successful pairings with brother Bing Crosby on the Decca label. Bob and Patty even scored a hit duet on Decca Records with their duet recording of the novelty "The Pussy Cat Song (Nyow! Nyot Nyow!)," which peaked at No. 12 on Billboard. A half-hour CBS daytime series, The Bob Crosby Show, followed from 1953 to 1957. Bob introduced the Canadian singer Gisele MacKenzie to American audiences and subsequently guest-starred in 1957 on her NBC television series, The Gisele MacKenzie Show.

On September 14, 1952, he replaced Phil Harris as the bandleader on The Jack Benny Program, remaining until Benny retired the weekly radio show in May 1955 after 23 years. In joining the show, he became the leader of the same group of musicians who had played under Harris. According to Benny writer Milt Josefsberg, Crosby was hired for budget reasons. Because of strong competition from TV, the radio program budget had to be reduced, and so Bob replaced Phil. Prior to joining Benny on the radio, Crosby, who was based on the east coast, would often play with Benny during Benny's live New York appearances, and he was seen frequently throughout the 1950s on Benny's television series.

As a performer, Crosby had tremendous charisma and wit combined with a laid-back persona. He was able to swap jokes competently with Benny, including humorous references to his brother Bing's wealth and his string of losing racehorses. An exchange during one of the popular Christmas programs ran thus: Crosby muses to Jack that he's bought gifts for everyone but band member Frank Remley. When Jack suggests "a cordial, like a bottle of Drambuie," Crosby counters that Drambuie is an after-dinner drink and adds, alluding to Remley's penchant for alcohol, that "Remley never quite makes it to after dinner."

=== Television ===
Bob Crosby guest-starred in the television series The Gisele MacKenzie Show. He also starred in his own afternoon variety show, The Bob Crosby Show, that aired from 1953 to 1957. His follow-up prime time show, also titled The Bob Crosby Show, aired during the summer of 1958. He also fronted a TV program in Australia in the 1960s. He was one of two featured singers (the other being Dennis Day) in mid-1950s episodes of The Jack Benny Program.

== Personal life ==
Crosby's first marriage was to Marie Elizabeth Grounitz. They had a daughter, Elizabeth Ann. He married socialite June Kuhn at his home in Spokane on September 22, 1938. They had five children: Christopher, George, Stephen, Cathleen and Junie. Crosby died in La Jolla, San Diego, California, on March 9, 1993, at 79, from complications of cancer.

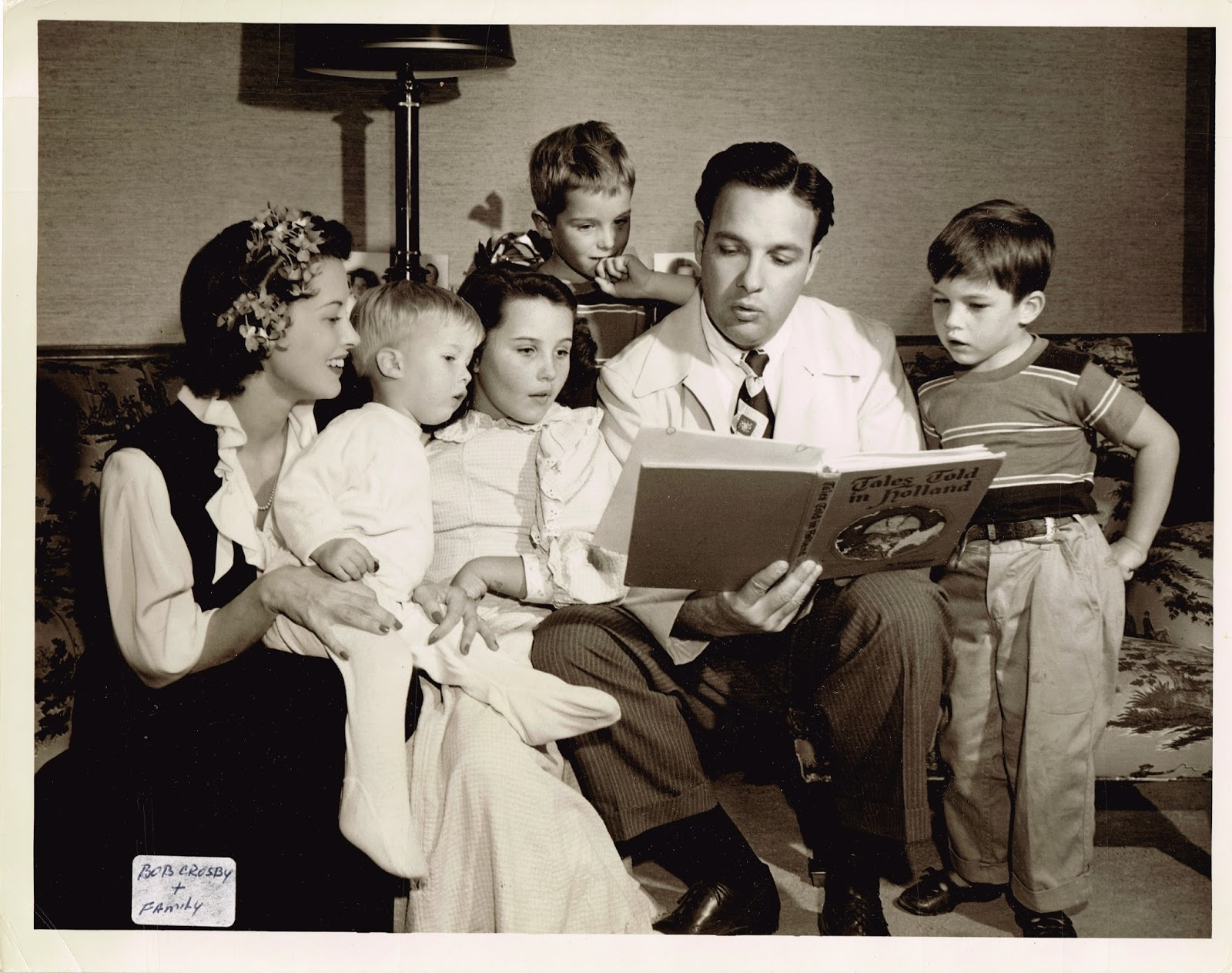
Bob Crosby reading "Tales Told in Holland" to his family.

== Awards and honors ==
Crosby received two stars on the Hollywood Walk of Fame on February 8, 1960, for television (at 6252 Hollywood Boulevard) and radio (at 6313 Hollywood Boulevard).

== Partial filmography ==
- Rhythm on the Roof (1934, short) – Himself
- Collegiate (1936) – Chorus Boy
- Paramount Headliner: Bob Crosby and His Orchestra (1938, short) – Orchestra Leader
- Let's Make Music (1941) – Himself
- Sis Hopkins (1941) – Jeff Farnsworth
- Rookies on Parade (1941) – Duke Wilson
- Abercrombie Had a Zombie (1941, short) – Himself
- Merry-Go-Roundup (1941, short) – Himself
- Holiday Inn (1942) – Orchestra Leader (uncredited)
- Reveille with Beverly (1943) – Himself
- Presenting Lily Mars (1943) – Himself
- Don't Hook Now (1943, short) – Himself
- Thousands Cheer (1943) – Himself
- See Here, Private Hargrove (1944) – Himself
- Pardon My Rhythm (1944) – Himself
- Kansas City Kitty (1944) – Jimmy
- The Singing Sheriff (1944) – Bob Richards
- My Gal Loves Music (1944) – Mel Murray
- Meet Miss Bobby Socks (1944) – Don Collins
- Pillow to Post (1945) – Clarence Wilson (scenes deleted)
- When You're Smiling (1950) – Himself
- Call Me Mister (1951) – Himself (uncredited)
- Stars in the Eye (1951)
- Two Tickets to Broadway (1951) – Orchestra Leader
- The Greatest Show on Earth (1952) – Spectator (uncredited)
- Down Among the Sheltering Palms (1952) – Himself (uncredited)
- Road to Bali (1952) – Himself (uncredited)
- Senior Prom (1958) – Bob Crosby
- The Five Pennies (1959) – Wil Paradise (final film role)
