= Johnny Bayersdorffer =

American jazz cornetist and bandleader (1899–1969)

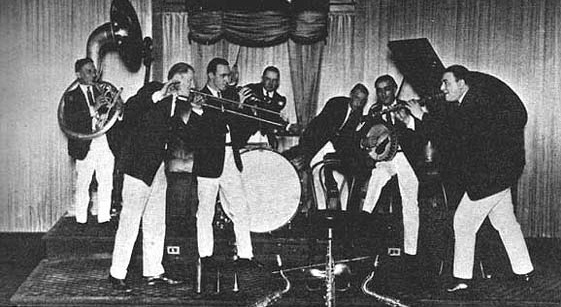
Johnny Bayersdorffer's Jazzola Novelty Orchestra, New Orleans. Left to right: Chink Martin Abraham, brass bass; Tom Brown, trombone; Johnny Bayersdorffer, cornet & leader; Leo Adde, drums; Steve Loyacano, banjo; Nunzio Scaglione, clarinet.

Johnny Bayersdorffer (4 August 1899 – 14 November 1969) was a New Orleans jazz cornetist and bandleader.

Bayersdorffer was a popular bandleader at the Spanish Fort resort on Bayou St. John by Lake Pontchartrain. He is best remembered to later generations for his 1920s recordings for Okeh Records. Bayersdorffer also played with Happy Schilling and Tony Parenti's bands.
