= Ray Bauduc =

American jazz drummer (1906–1988)

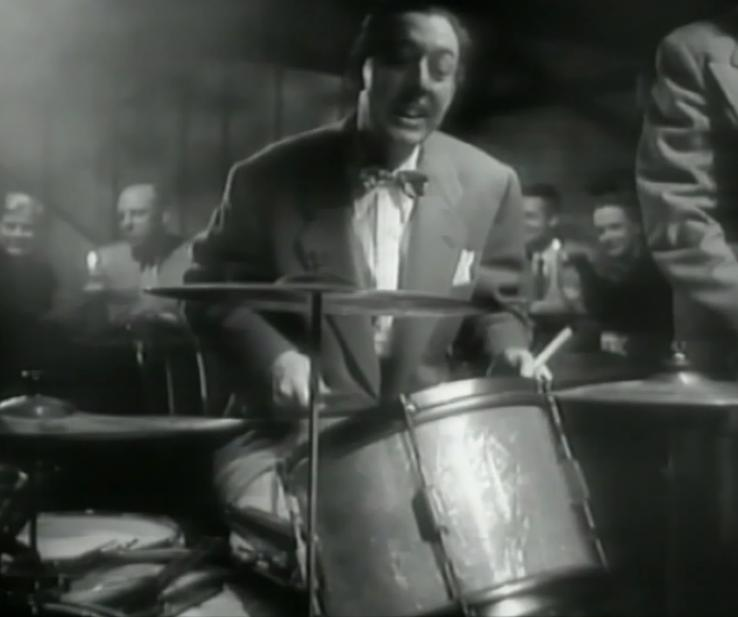
- Bauduc in the movie The Fabulous Dorseys, 1947

Background information
- Born: June 18, 1906; New Orleans, Louisiana, U.S.
- Died: January 8, 1988 (aged 81) Houston, Texas, U.S.
- Genres: Jazz
- Occupation: Musician
- Instrument: Drums
- Formerly of: Bob Crosby

Ray Bauduc (June 18, 1906 – January 8, 1988) was an American jazz drummer best known for his work with the Bob Crosby Orchestra and their band-within-a-band, the Bobcats, between 1935 and 1942. He is also known for his shared composition of "Big Noise from Winnetka," a jazz standard.

== Career ==
Bauduc was born in New Orleans, Louisiana, United States. He was the son of cornetist Jules Bauduc. His older brother, Jules Jr., was a banjoist and bandleader. His sister was a pianist. Bauduc's youthful work in New Orleans included performing in the band of Johnny Bayersdorffer, and on radio broadcasts. His New Orleans origin instilled in him a love for two-beat drumming, which he retained when he played with Bob Crosby's swing-era big band. In 1926, he moved to New York City to join Joe Venuti's band. His other work in the 1920s included recording with the Original Memphis Five and the Scranton Sirens, which included Tommy Dorsey and Jimmy Dorsey.

His time with the Bob Crosby Orchestra brought him national fame. Bauduc and bassist Bob Haggart composed two hits for the orchestra: "South Rampart Street Parade" (recorded in November 1937), and "Big Noise from Winnetka" (recorded in 1938). The latter song was later played by the Crosby orchestra with lyrics and horns.

Bauduc's use of woodblocks, cowbells, China cymbals, and tom-toms distinguished him from most drummers of the swing era, and made him one of the few white drummers to be influenced by Warren "Baby" Dodds (some others being George Wettling, Dave Tough and Gene Krupa, though with them Dodds's influence was less obvious).

Bauduc was a trend setter in traditional jazz circles. His precise, disciplined, yet fiery patterns and syncopated fills, helped New Orleans drummers make the transition into swing from the rigid, clipped progressions that had defined the previous era.

Bauduc served in the U.S. Army Artillery Band until November 1944. After his discharge, he and former Crosby group leader Gil Rodin formed a short-lived big band. Bauduc toured with a septet in 1946 and also worked in Tommy Dorsey's orchestra from August to October of the year. In early 1947, he joined Bob Crosby's new group, leaving in 1948 to play with Jimmy Dorsey, where he stayed for the next two years. He freelanced on the West Coast for a couple of years before joining Jack Teagarden in 1952. In 1955, he formed a band with Nappy Lamare from the Crosby orchestra which found considerable success, touring nationally and recording several albums.

From 1960, Bauduc lived in Bellaire, Texas, in semi-retirement, but visited New Orleans in 1983. He appeared occasionally at Crosby Orchestra reunions and worked with Pud Brown on several recordings. He played with the Market Square Jazz Band headed by James Weiler in the early 1980s in Houston. He died in Houston, Texas, on January 8, 1988.

== Discography ==
- Big Band Dixieland (Bob Crosby and His Orchestra)

== Drum books ==
- Dixieland Drumming (1936)
- 150 Progressive Drum Rhythms (1940)

== Bibliography ==
- New Orleans Jazz, A Family Album. Al Rose and Edmond Souchon, third edition, Louisiana State University Press, 1984, ISBN 9780807111734
