= Ben Pollack =

American swing drummer and bandleader (1903–1971)

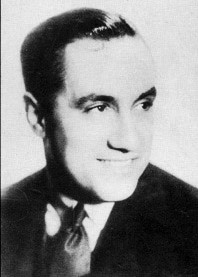
- Ben Pollack c. 1928

Background information
- Born: June 22, 1903; Chicago, Illinois, U.S.
- Died: June 7, 1971 (aged 67) Palm Springs, California, U.S.
- Genres: Jazz; dixieland; swing; big band
- Occupations: Musician, bandleader
- Instrument: Drums
- Years active: 1923–1971
- Labels: Banner; Cameo; Domino; Lincoln; Perfect; Romeo; Bluebird; Brunswick; Vocalion

Benjamin "Ben" Pollack (June 22, 1903 – June 7, 1971) was an American drummer and bandleader from the mid-1920s through the swing era. His eye for talent led him to employ musicians such as Benny Goodman, Jack Teagarden, Glenn Miller, Jimmy McPartland, and Harry James. This ability earned him the nickname the "Father of Swing".

== Music career ==
=== Early years ===
Pollack was born in Chicago, learned to play drums in high school and formed groups on the side, performing professionally in his teens. He joined the New Orleans Rhythm Kings in Chicago in 1923 and later joined the Los Angeles-based Harry Bastin Band.

In 1924, he returned to Chicago, where he played for several bands, including Art Kessel's, which ultimately led to his forming a band, the 12-piece Venice Ballroom Orchestra, there in 1925, also known as Ben Pollack and his Californians, which had some performances broadcast on WLW radio in Cincinnati, Ohio.

Over time the band included Benny Goodman, Glenn Miller, Jack Teagarden, and Jimmy McPartland. One of the earliest members of his band was Gil Rodin, a saxophonist whose business acumen served him well later as an executive for the Music Corporation of America.

From about 1928, with involvement from Irving Mills, members of Pollack's band moonlighted at Plaza-ARC and recorded a vast quantity of hot dance and jazz for their dime store labels — Banner, Perfect, Domino, Cameo, Lincoln, Romeo — under the names Mills' Merry Makers, Goody's Good Timers, Kentucky Grasshoppers, Mills' Musical Clowns, The Lumberjacks, Dixie Daises, The Caroliners, The Whoopee Makers, The Hotsy Totsy Gang, Dixie Jazz Band, and Jimmy Bracken's Toe Ticklers. Combining Pollack's regular recordings with these side groups made Pollack's one of the more prolific bands of the 1920s and 1930s.

Pollack and His Californians, Chicago, 1927: (L-R) Glenn Miller, Benny Goodman, Gil Rodin, Harry Green, Ben Pollack, Fud Livingston, Al Harris, Harry Goodman, Vic Briedis, Lou Kastler

Pollack's band played in Chicago and moved to New York City in 1928, having obtained McPartland and Teagarden around that time. This outfit enjoyed immense success, playing for Broadway shows and winning an exclusive engagement at the Park Central Hotel. Pollack's band was involved in extensive recording activity at that time, using a variety of pseudonyms in the studios. The orchestra also made a Vitaphone short subject sound film.

Pollack, in the meantime, had fancied himself as more of a bandleader-singer type instead of a drummer. To this end, he signed Ray Bauduc to handle the drumming chores. The band was booked by the Park Central Hotel in New York, during which time they became known as Ben Pollack and his Park Central Orchestra. Benny Goodman and Jimmy McPartland left the band in mid-1929. They were replaced by Matty Matlock on clarinet and Jack Teagarden's brother, Charlie, on trumpet. Eddie Miller was also signed as a tenor saxophonist in 1930.

=== Breakup and reformation ===
The band broke up in 1935. Many of its members soon formed a group led by Bob Crosby, brother of Bing Crosby.

Pollack formed a new band with Harry James and Irving Fazola. With James he wrote the hit "Peckin'". In the early 1940s, he organized a band led by comedian Chico Marx. He started Jewel Records, and appeared as himself in the movie The Benny Goodman Story, and made a cameo in The Glenn Miller Story.

He also ran the restaurant "Pick-A-Rib" in Hollywood in the 1950s and early 1960s. In 1965, he moved to Palm Springs where he and his sister, Esther Mendelson, operated up a nightclub called Easy Street North. The nightclub, however, never became successful, which led to many financial problems that would later contribute to his suicide.

Pollack's bands from the 1920s through the 1940s included Benny Goodman, Bud Freeman, Dick Cathcart, Eddie Miller, Frank Teschemacher, Freddie Slack, Glenn Miller, Charlie Spivak, Harry James, Irving Fazola, Jack Teagarden, Jimmy McPartland, Joe Marsala, Matty Matlock, Muggsy Spanier, and Yank Lawson.

== Personal life ==
Pollack and Doris Robbins, who had no children, were divorced in 1957. In later years, after suffering a series of financial losses, Pollack grew despondent and hanged himself in his home in Palm Springs in 1971. He was buried in the Hollywood Forever Cemetery.

== Labels ==
In 1926, Pollack began recording for the Victor Talking Machine Company. A 1927 newspaper ad promoted "a new Victor organization – Ben Pollack and His Californians."

Pollack left Victor in late 1929 and recorded for Hit of the Week (1930), the dime store labels (Banner, Cameo, Domino, Lincoln, Perfect, Romeo) (1930–1931), Victor (1933), Columbia (1933–1934), Brunswick, Vocalion and Variety (1936–37), and Decca (1937–1938).

Most of these records are listed in discographical books (such as Brian Rust's Jazz Records) as by Irving Mills. Jack Teagarden's Music lists them as a "Ben Pollack Unit".

== Compositions ==
Pollack co-wrote the jazz standard "Tin Roof Blues" in 1923 when he was a member of the New Orleans Rhythm Kings. The band's trombonist George Brunies is also credited as a composer. In 1954, Jo Stafford recorded "Make Love to Me", which used Pollack's music from "Tin Roof Blues". "Make Love to Me" was No. 1 for three weeks in Billboard magazine and No. 2 in Cashbox. The song was also recorded by Anne Murray and B. B. King.

== Filmography ==
- Presenting Lily Mars (1943) – saxophonist in Bob Crosby's Orchestra (uncredited)
- Dark City (1950) – bettor (uncredited)
- Disc Jockey (1951) – himself
- The Glenn Miller Story (1954) – himself
- The Benny Goodman Story (1956) – himself

== Notes ==
- Jack Teagardenn's Music – His Career and Recordings by Howard J. Waters, Jr. (Walter C. Allen, 1960)
- Jazz Records 1897–1942 by Brian Rust, 5th revised and enlarged edition (Storyville Publications, 1982)
