= Sharkey Bonano =

American jazz trumpeter, band leader, and vocalist (1904–1972)

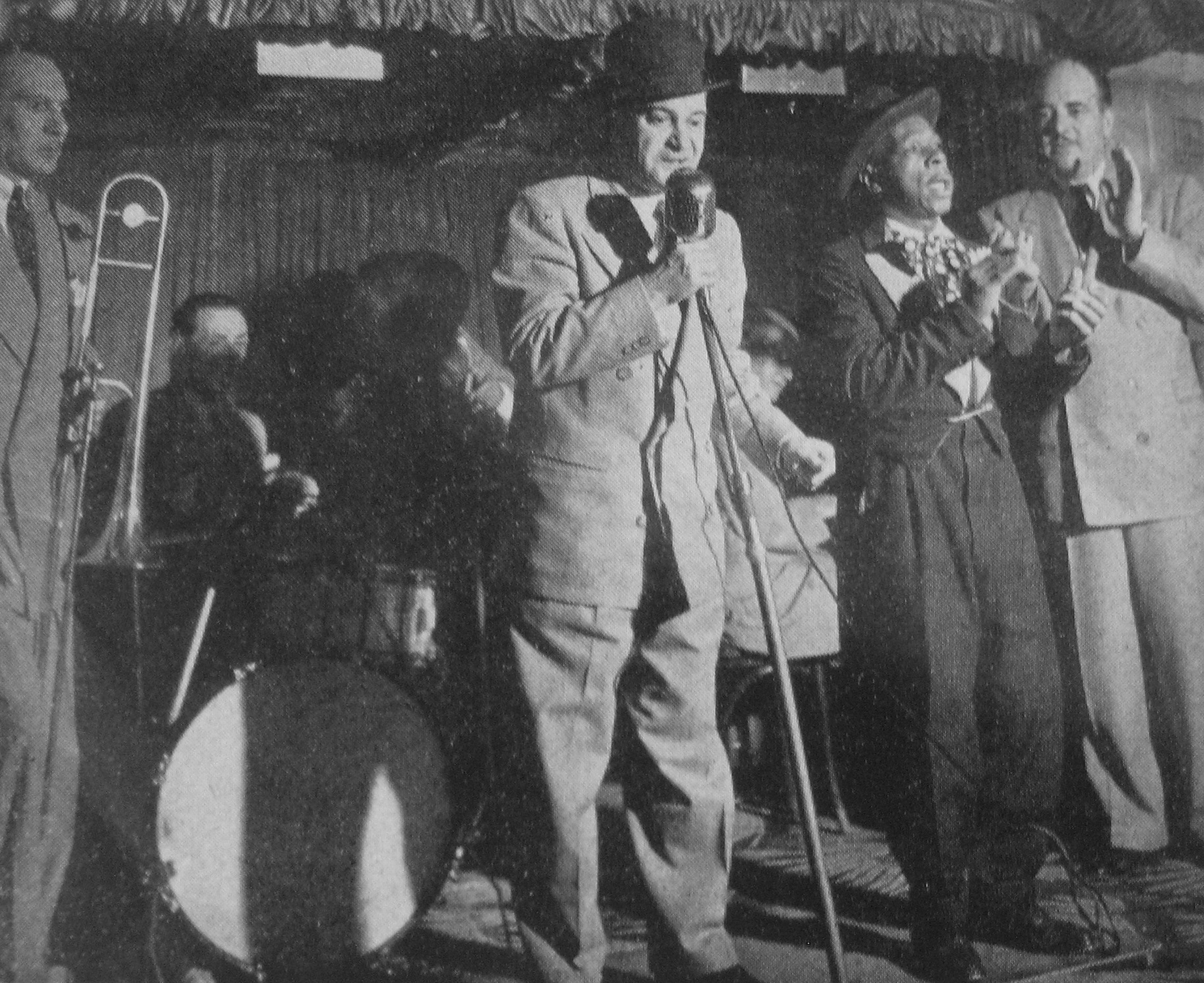
- Bonano performs (center at microphone) in New Orleans in 1950. Photo by Stanley Kubrick

Background information
- Also known as: Sharkey Banana; Sharkey Bananas
- Born: Joseph Gustaf Bonano; August 9, 1902; New Orleans, Louisiana, U.S.
- Died: March 27, 1972 (aged 69) New Orleans, Louisiana, U.S.
- Genres: Jazz, Dixieland
- Occupation: Musician
- Instrument: Trumpet
- Years active: 1920s–1960s

Joseph Gustaf "Sharkey" Bonano (August 9, 1902 – March 27, 1972), also known as Sharkey Banana or Sharkey Bananas, was an American jazz trumpeter, band leader, and vocalist. His musical abilities were sometimes overlooked because of his love of being an entertainer; he would often sing silly lyrics in a high raspy voice and break into dance on stage.

== Biography ==
Bonano was born in the Milneburg neighborhood of New Orleans near Lake Pontchartrain. In the 1920s he was in the New Orleans bands of Freddie Newman and Chink Martin. After moving to New York City, he found work as a member of the Wolverines and with Jimmy Durante. He worked next to Frankie Trumbauer and Bix Beiderbecke as a member the Jean Goldkette orchestra. At the end of the 1920s, he led a band which included Louis Prima. During the 1930s he formed the Sharks of Rhythm and played in the Original Dixieland Jass Band. His sidemen during this period included Santo Pecora and Thurman Teague.

After World War II he toured Europe, Asia, and South America, played residencies in Chicago and New York, and then was a regular on Bourbon Street in the New Orleans French Quarter. In 1949, he appeared at the Roosevelt Hotel's Blue Room and the Famous Door Bar.

Bonano died on March 27, 1972, at the age of 69.

== Discography ==
- Sharkey's Southern Comfort (1950)
- Kings of Dixieland (Capitol, 1950)
- A Night in Old New Orleans (Capitol, 1950)
- Sharkey Bonano (Circle, 1951)
- Sounds of New Orleans, Vol. 4: Live at the Perez Club (Storyville, 1952)
- Midnight on Bourbon Street (1952
- Sharkey Bonano (Southland, 1954)
- Recorded in New Orleans, Vol. 1 (Good Time Jazz, 1956)
- Sharkey Bonano w/ Santo Pecora and George Girard (Southland, 1956)
- In a New Orleans Jam Session (Southland, 1958)
- Dixieland at the Roundtable (Roulette, 1960)
- Sharkey Bonano at the Municipal Auditorium 1949 (GHB, 2010)
- Sharkey Bonano and His Sharks of Rhythm (Jazz Classics)
- Sharkey & His Kings of Dixieland (GHB, 1995)
