= Greeks in New Orleans =

Ethnic group

Languages
- Greek

Related ethnic groups
- Hondurans in New Orleans, Italians in New Orleans, Vietnamese in New Orleans

The Greek presence in New Orleans dates to the late 18th century and developed gradually into a small but influential community. Beginning with early settlers such as Michel Dragon, Greek families became embedded in the city's Creole society, established religious institutions, participated in military and civic life, and contributed to trade, journalism, music, and Mardi Gras culture. Over time, immigration, maritime connections, and consular recognition reinforced New Orleans as a regional centre of Greek life in the American South.

During the American Civil War in 1864, the Greek community in New Orleans began a small church community, and in 1866, they erected the first Greek Orthodox Church in North America, called Holy Trinity Church on 1222 North Dorgenois Street. By the early 1900s, a massive influx of Greek immigrants arrived in the region, including restaurateurs, bakers, fruit sellers, seafood merchants, and skilled craftsmen like carpenters. New Orleans was one of four cities honored with a Greek consulate, along with Boston, Pittsburgh, and Minneapolis, in 1918.

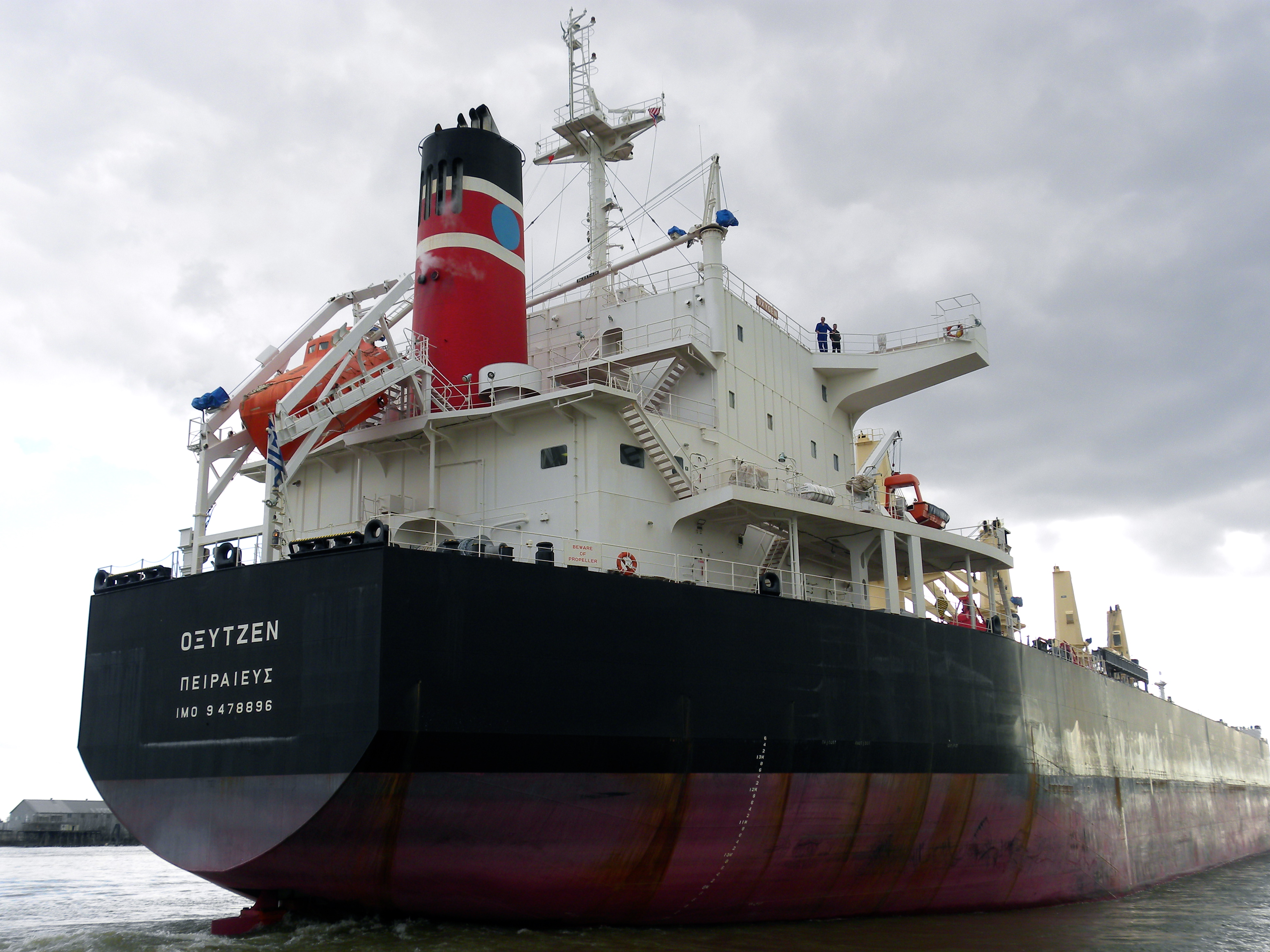
Greek Freighter in New Orleans in 2011

Meanwhile, New York, San Francisco, and Chicago featured larger general consulates.

In 1953, the royal monarchs of Greece, King Paul and Queen Frederica of Greece, visited New Orleans for forty-eight hours, attending religious services at the Greek Orthodox Church of the Holy Trinity, and the royals also toured the city. The Port of New Orleans was a vital shipping destination because of its strategic location at the mouth of the Mississippi River, providing access to a waterway system connecting 37 states. In the 1970s, over 20,000 Greek sailors visited the city yearly, and the French Quarter featured a Greek entertainment district. Some businesses still remain in the district, and the city features a yearly Greek festival, offered by Holy Trinity Greek Orthodox Cathedral.

== History of Greeks in New Orleans ==
The earliest known Greek settlement in New Orleans began with Michel Dragon during the late 1700s, before the city became part of the United States of America. Michel Dragon was a Greek merchant and lieutenant who served in the Spanish Army during the American Revolution, fighting with the Patriots for the independence of the United States of America. He migrated from Athens to New Orleans in the late 18th century, before the city became part of the United States, and married a freed African slave named Marie Francoise Chauvin Beaulieu de Montplasir. Their mixed-race daughter, Marianne Celeste Dragon, was born in New Orleans and became one of the earliest Greek Americans. She later married Andrea Dimitry, a Greek settler from the island of Hydra who also became an American war hero. Together, they established one of the oldest Creole families in New Orleans, known as the Dimitry Family, in 1800.

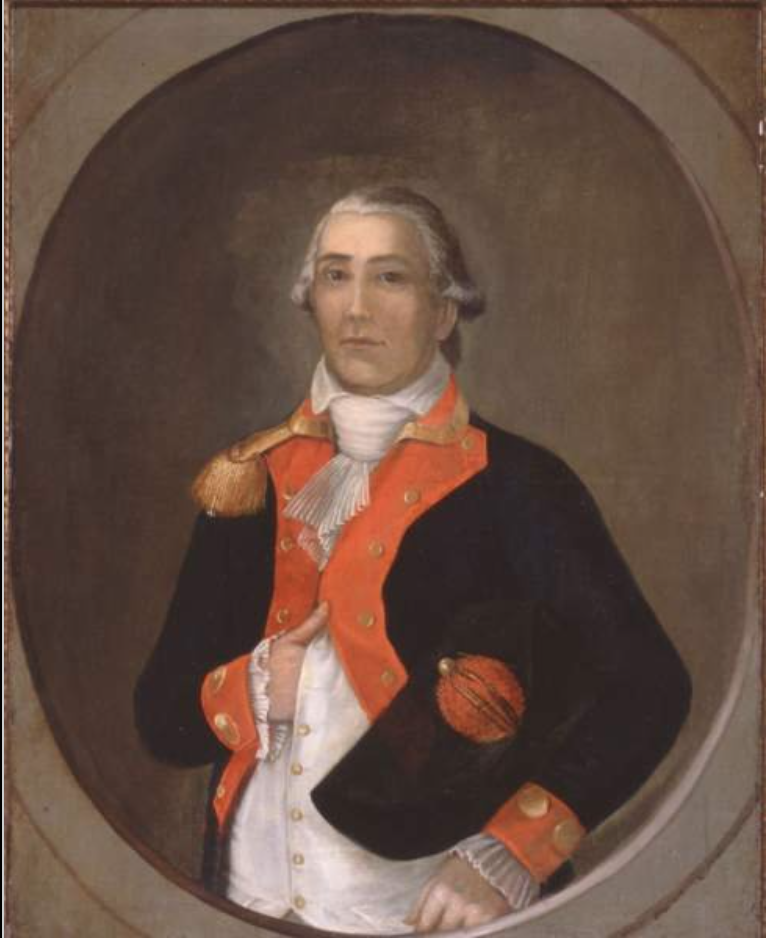
Greek American Revolutionary War hero Michel Dragon settled in New Orleans in the 1700s

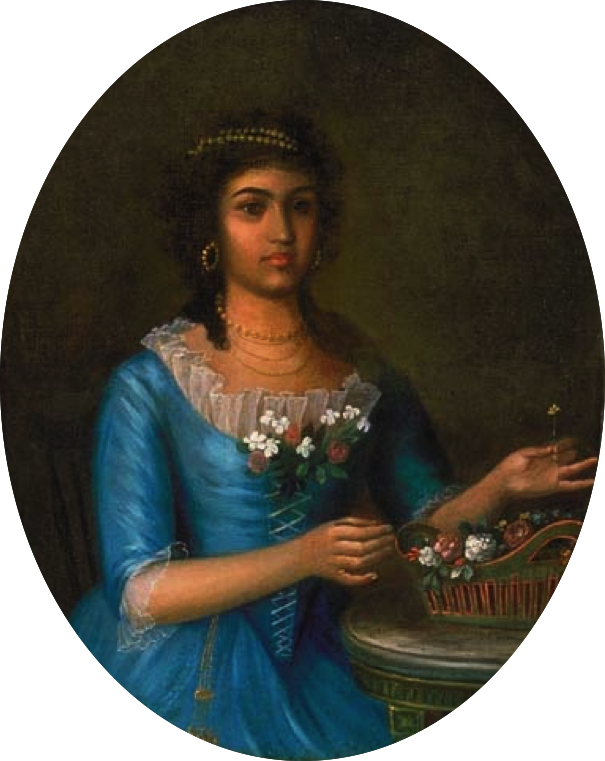
Marianne Celeste Dragon, one of the earliest Greek Americans, born in New Orleans

Andrea Dimitry and Marianne Celeste Dragon had more than ten children, establishing a multigenerational Greek Creole community in the region. Each of their children, in turn, had large families, leading to rapid demographic growth. By the middle of the 19th century, the Dimitry family alone numbered over 150 individuals, and today their descendants in New Orleans number in the tens of thousands. The family name derives from Ancient Greece and venerates the goddess of harvest, Demeter. Some members of the family continue to preserve aspects of their Greek heritage to this day.

By the 1850s, additional Greeks had settled in New Orleans, and the United States census recorded more than 150 Greek-born residents living in the city, the first year in which birthplace was formally tabulated. During this period, Nicholas Marino Benachi (1812–1886), a representative of the prominent Rallis merchant family, arrived in the city and later served as the Greek consul in New Orleans.

Greek cultural influence also became visible in the civic life of New Orleans. In 1856, the Mistick Krewe of Comus, the oldest Mardi Gras krewe, was founded and named after the Ancient Greek god of festivity. During the American Civil War, most members of the mixed-race Greek American Dimitry family fought on the Confederate side. In 1861, Greeks in New Orleans also organised a militia unit aligned with the Confederacy, known as The Greek Company A, Louisiana Militia.

Paul Pandely, a gentleman of English and Greek descent, whose grandmother, Elizabeth English, was of royal lineage and part of the House of Stuart, married Marianne, and Andrea's oldest daughter, Euphrosine Dimitry, who was also of Greek descent. Their marriage was considered mixed race. Marianne and Andrea's second child, Aimèe Manualla Dimitry's daughter, Marie Philomene Elizabeth Dietz, married the Greek nephew of Andrea Dimitry from Hydra, Greece, named John Dimitry. John was a captain in New Orleans.

New Orleans became home to the world-renowned Mardi Gras and established Mardi Gras krewes. Greek themes inspired some of the krewes, such as the Krewe of Bacchus, Krewe of Orpheus, and Krewe of Muses. The Titans, Athena, and Proteus are also venerated in the region during the historical festival. The oldest krewe known as Mistick Krewe of Comus was founded in 1856, venerating the Ancient Greek god of festivity. Nicolas Benachi arrived in New Orleans sometime in the 1850s. He was a representative of the Rallis family. Nicolas was also the Greek consul in the region.

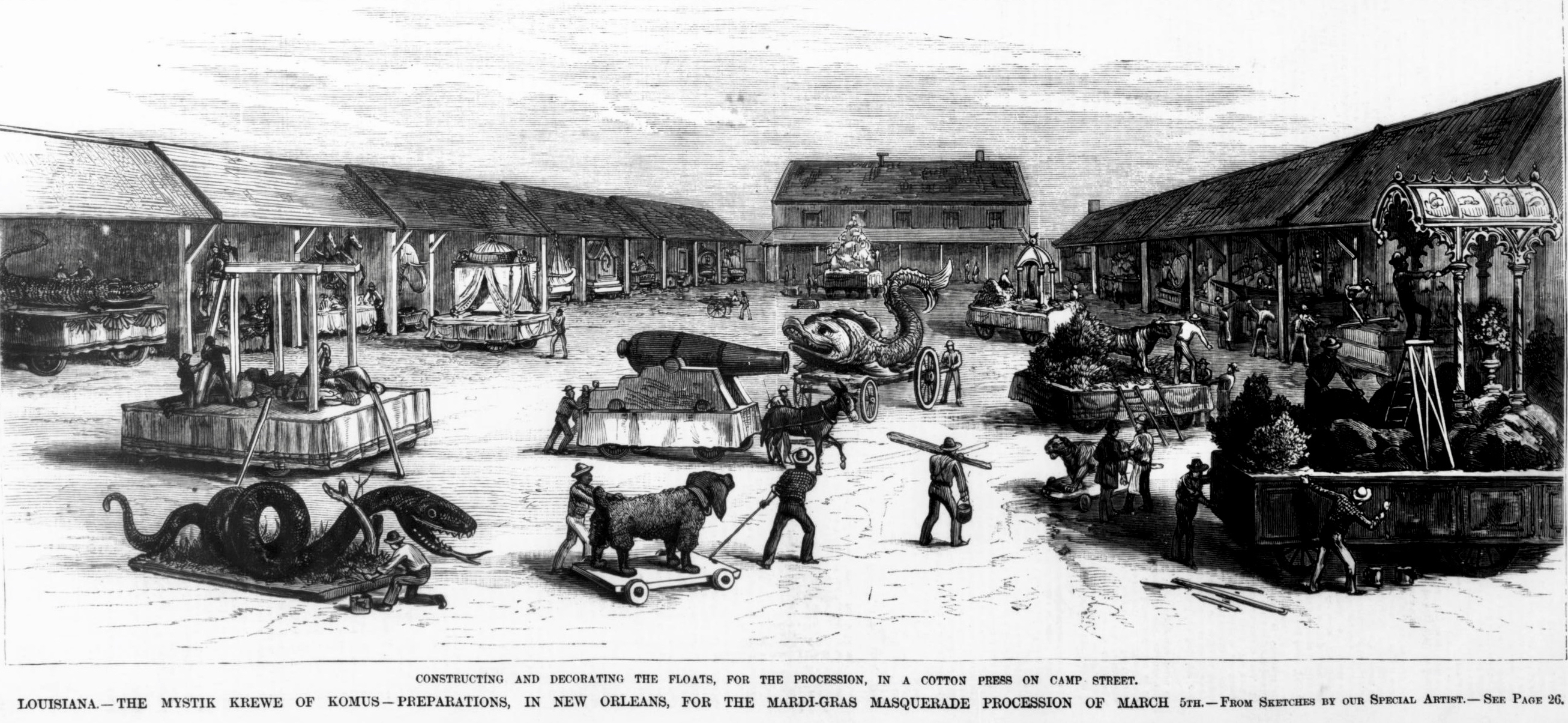
Mistick Krewe of Comus Mardi Gras preparation 1878, oldest Krewe named after Ancient Greek god of festivity Comus

The Rallis Brothers was a massive Greek family-run business spanning the entire world, perhaps the most successful expatriate Greek merchant business of the Victorian era.

By the time of the death of Andrea Dimitry, a Greek vessel was in the port of New Orleans, Louisiana. The officers and crew of a Greek vessel attended the funeral in unison, and the flags of their ship were flown at half mast during the day.

In 1861, the Greeks of New Orleans also formed a militia regiment to fight for the Confederate side in the American Civil War. It was called The Greek Company A, Louisiana Militia. They also founded a Greek church during the American Civil War, which was erected in 1866, called Holy Trinity Greek Orthodox Cathedral, New Orleans.

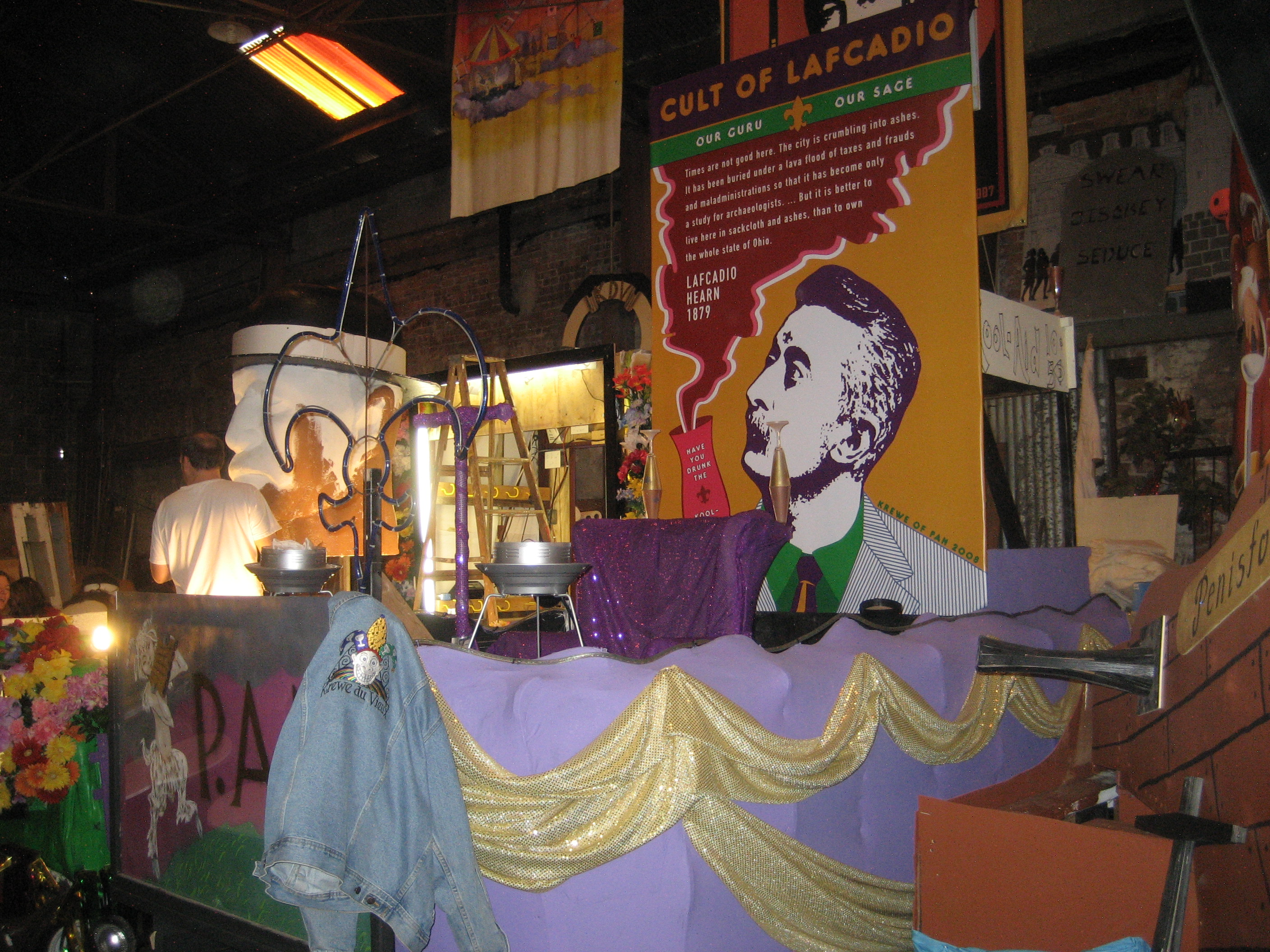
In 2008, a float named Cult of Lafcadio appeared during Mardi Gras in honor of Lafcadio Hearn.

Greek newspaper journalist and translator Lafcadio Hearn, born in Lefkada, Greece, appeared in New Orleans from 1877 to 1887. Hearn created and published nearly two hundred woodcuts of daily life and people in New Orleans, making the Daily City Item the first Southern newspaper to introduce cartoons and giving the paper an immediate boost in circulation. Hearn gave up carving the woodcuts after six months when he found the strain was too great for his eye.

By the early 1900s, Greek immigrants arrived in the region, and in 1918, a second Greek consulate was established in New Orleans, representing the restaurateurs, bakers, fruit sellers, seafood merchants, and skilled craftsmen like carpenters.

Ellis Stratakos, the son of a Greek candy shop owner, was a Greek American Jazz musician who grew up in New Orleans, frequenting black jazz clubs in the Crescent City to study and learn the new popular rebellious genre of music. He was part of a large number of bands and toured the South with countless Jazz musicians of the time, some included: Louis Prima, Ray Bauduc, and Irving Fazola. One of his notable gigs was at the rooftop dance lounge of the Jung Hotel in New Orleans with a band called Ellis Stratakos & His Hotel Jung Orchestra.

King Paul and Queen Frederica of Greece: The reigning Greek monarchs visited New Orleans for 48 hours in 1953, attending religious services at the Greek Orthodox Church of the Holy Trinity and touring the city. The royals were designated honorary citizens of New Orleans.

== Holy Trinity Greek Orthodox Cathedral, New Orleans ==
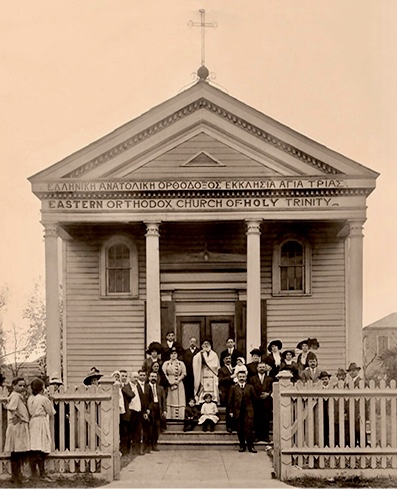
Holy Trinity of New Orleans in 1911

The original community of Holy Trinity Greek Orthodox Church came together in 1864, and the first church building was built in 1866, named Holy Trinity Church on 1222 North Dorgenois Street. Notable donations were given by Nicholas Benachi, Demetrios Botassis, and John Botassis. There was also support from the oldest Greek American family in New Orleans, known as the Dimitry family. The original Holy Trinity church (which later added a library, cemetery, school, and parish house was replaced by a brick cathedral in 1950. In 1960, 100 years after Benachi's first efforts towards founding an Orthodox Church in New Orleans, Holy Trinity was consecrated as a cathedral. By 1976, the church was sold to Saint Luke's Episcopal Church, and the community relocated to 1200 Robert E. Lee Boulevard (now known as 1200 Allen Toussaint Boulevard in the 70122 zip code. The community used a temporary facility at the location until a community center was completed in 1980, and the current church, Holy Trinity Church Greek Orthodox Cathedral, was erected and consecrated in December 1985. The Byzantine iconography inside the interior of the church was completed by Lawrence Manos. The church features a very large yearly Greek festival.

== French Quarter's Greek entertainment district ==
The Port of New Orleans was a vital shipping destination for the Greek Merchant Marines because its strategic location at the mouth of the Mississippi River provided access to a waterway system connecting 37 states. By the 1970s, there was a Greek cultural space spanning 200 blocks on Decatur Street in the upper French Quarter. The bars and clubs catered to nearly 20,000 Greek sailors visiting the Port of New Orleans yearly. Some of the clubs were the Athenian Room, the Greek Club, Zorba's, the Acropolis, Mediterranean Room, and the Greek and Italian Seamen's Club. The people spoke Greek, ate Greek foods, listened to live bouzouki bands, and danced the traditional zeybekiko. Some of the businesses are still active today.

== Gallery ==
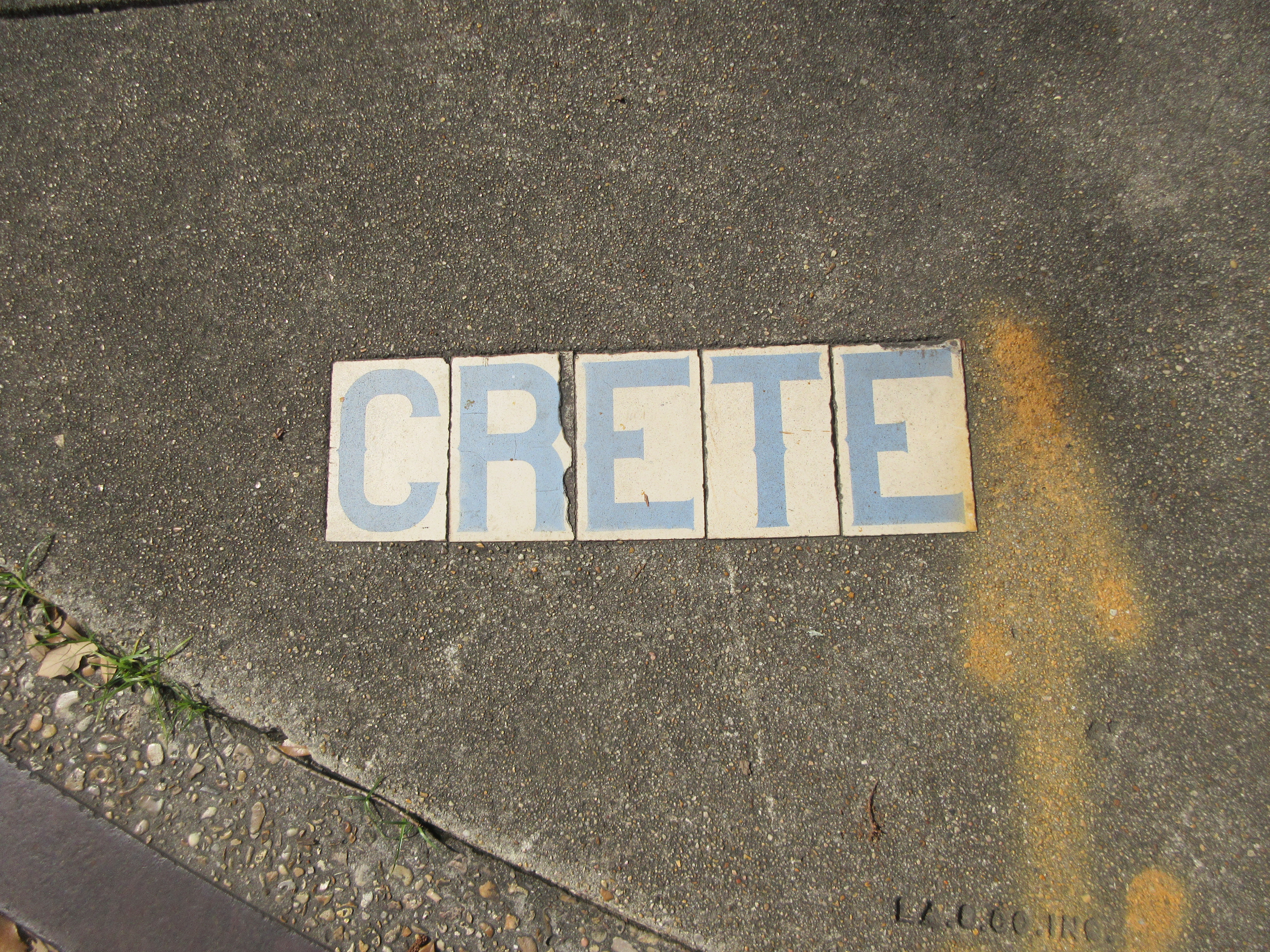
Crete Street in New Orleans

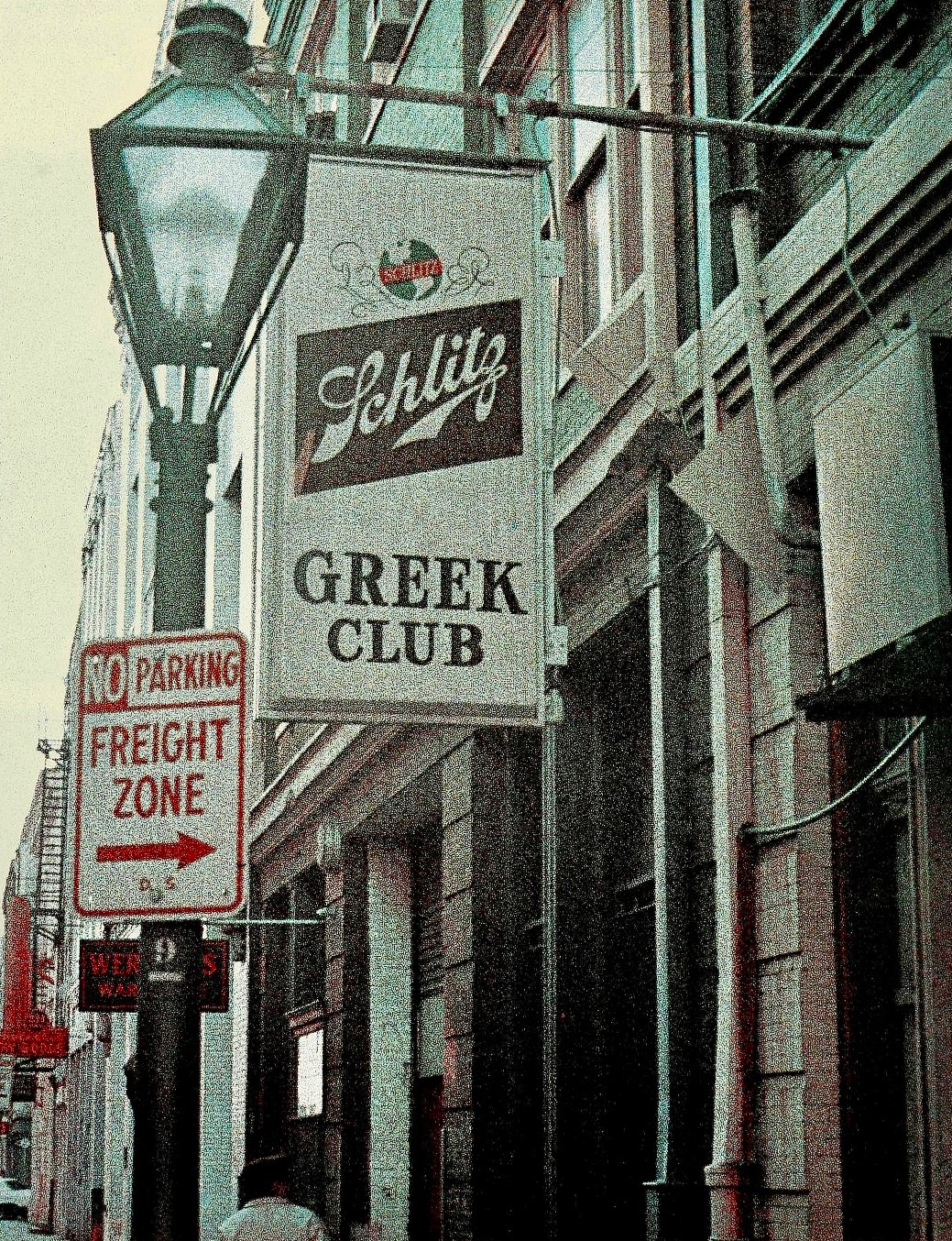
Schlitz Greek Club Decatur Street New Orleans Jambalaya in 1968

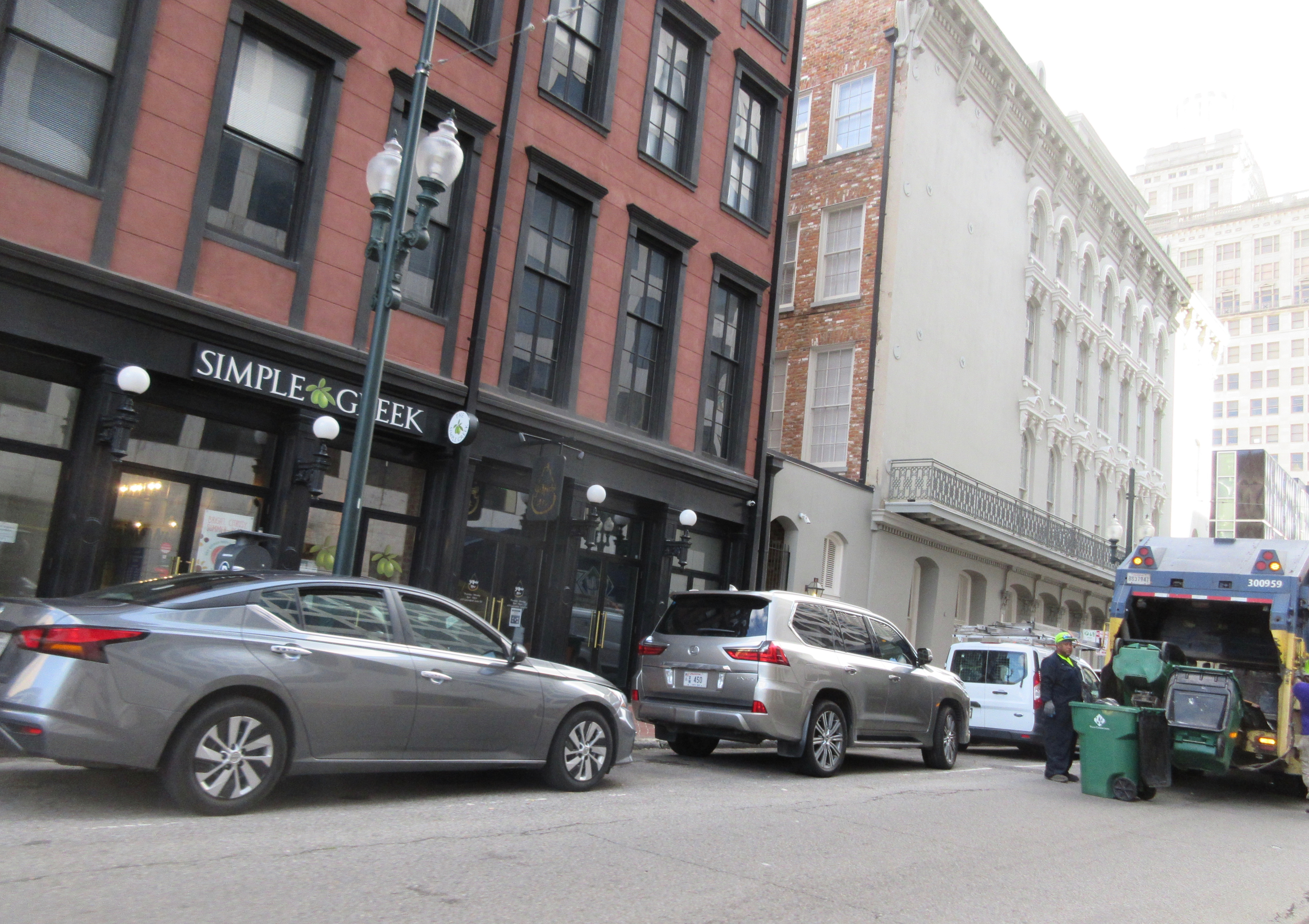
Simple Greek in New Orleans Business District 2021

== Notable people ==
- Michel Dragon (Lieutenant in the American Revolutionary War)
- Marianne Celeste Dragon (Creole socilate and founder of the Dimitry Family of New Orleans)
- Alexander Dimitry (First person of color to become U.S. Ambassador to Costa Rica & Nicaragua)
- Charles Patton Dimitry (Journalist and writer)
- Lafcadio Hearn (Spent 10 years in New Orleans as a writer.)
- Ellis Stratakos (Greek American Jazz musician from New Orleans)
- John Georges (New Orleans politician and businessman)

== Bibliography ==
- Pecquet du Bellet, Louise (1907a). Some Prominent Virginia Families. Vol. 4. Lynchburg,VA: J. P. Bell Company (Incorporated).
- Christophe, Landry (August 18, 2018). "Mixed Marriages In Louisiana Creole Families 164 marriages" (PDF). Louisiana Historic & Cultural Vistas. Archived (PDF) from the original on February 9, 2023.
