= Honduran Americans =

Americans of Honduran birth or descent

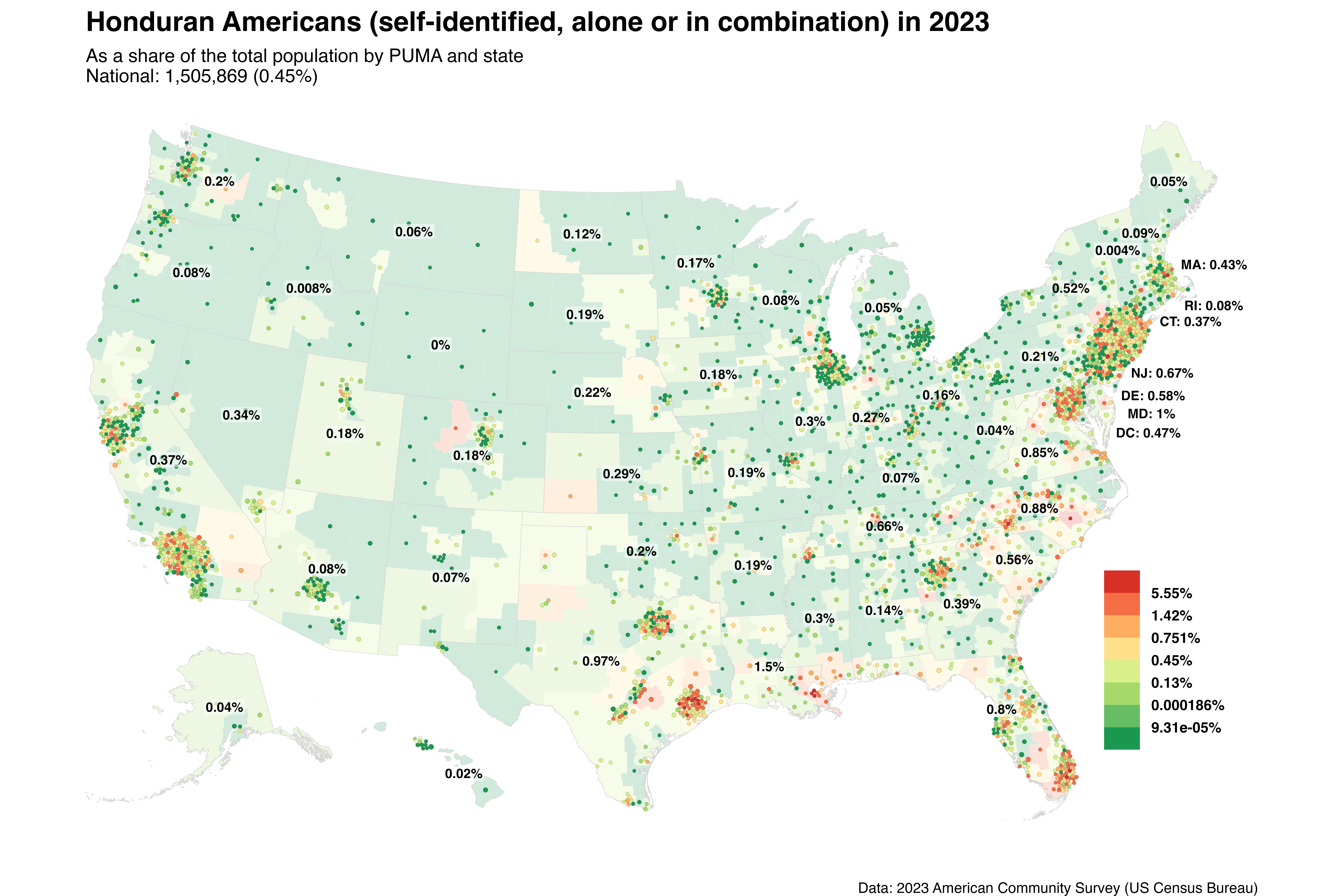

Total population
- 1,373,620 (2023); 0.41% of the U.S. population (2023)

Regions with significant populations
- New York City; Boston; Philadelphia; Indiana; Chicago; Milwaukee; Delaware; Maryland; Virginia; North Carolina; Atlanta; Miami; Louisville; Minneapolis; Kansas City; New Orleans; Oklahoma; Houston; Seattle; Denver; Greater Los Angeles; San Francisco Bay Area

Languages
- American English, Honduran Spanish, Garifuna, Spanglish

Religion
- Predominantly Roman Catholic; Minority Protestantism

Related ethnic groups
- other Hispanic Americans, Afro-Hondurans, Indigenous peoples of Honduras, Chinese Americans, Japanese Americans, Palestinian Americans, Spanish Americans, Italian Americans, German Americans, Ukrainian Americans, Danish Americans

Honduran Americans (Spanish: hondureño-americano, norteamericano de origen hondureño or estadounidense de origen hondureño) are Americans of full or partial Honduran descent. Hondurans are the eighth largest Hispanic group in the United States and the third largest Central American population, after Salvadorans and Guatemalans. Hondurans are concentrated in Texas, Florida and California, and are now the largest immigrant group in Louisiana.

== History ==
=== 19th century ===
The first Hondurans came to the United States during the late 18th and early 19th centuries. At that time, Honduras was known as the Intendencia de Comayagua, located in the Viceroyalty of New Spain. The province of Comayagua later gained independence from the Spanish Crown, becoming the Republic of Honduras. It then for a short time became a part of the Mexican empire from 1822 until 1823, when the empire started to collapse. Honduras then joined the Central American federation from 1823 to 1838.

=== 20th century ===
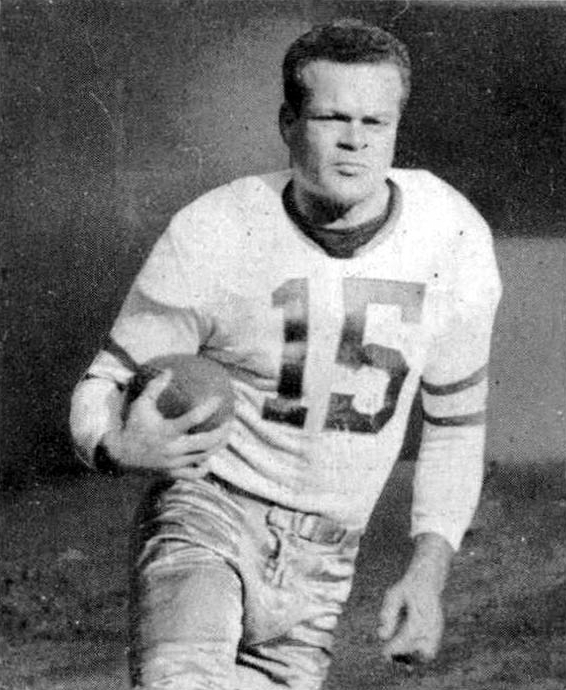
Football player Steve Van Buren, born in La Ceiba.

By the beginning of the century, a closer relationship between Honduras and the United States, permitted U.S. and Honduran citizens move from one country to another. One Honduran American of this era was Steve Van Buren, born in the city of La Ceiba. Despite dictatorships and wars, most Hondurans, primarily farmers and workers, had a stable way of life and experienced few social changes until the mid-to-late 20th century when several consecutive far-right coups occurred. Each period of conflict led to minor waves of Honduran emigration to the United States. Such was the case after the 1956 military coup, though Honduras remained relatively safe during this period, so low- and middle-class people in the big cities still had a safe and stable life.

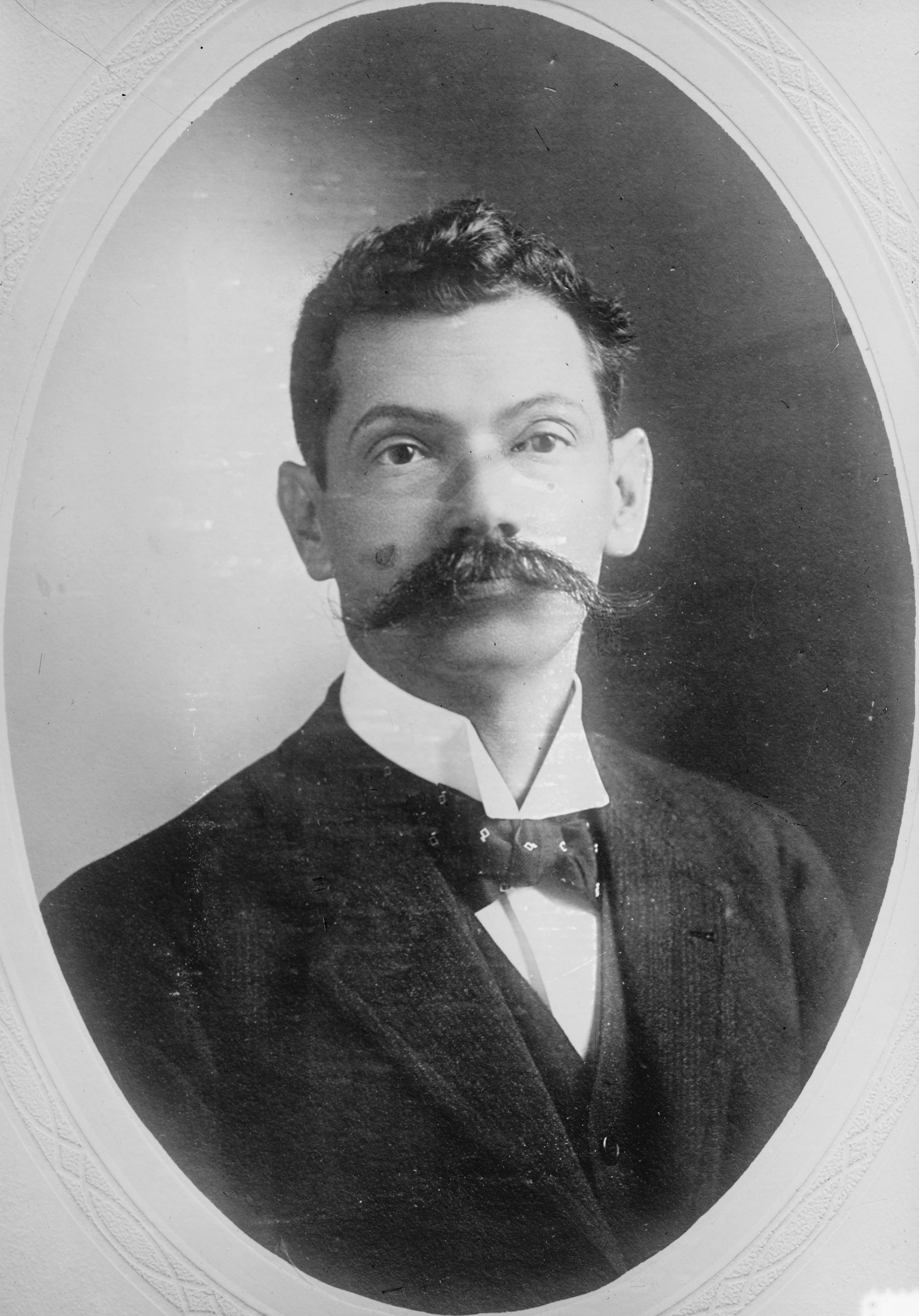
President Francisco Bertrand Barahona, had many relatives on U.S. soil.

Many Hondurans immigrated to the United States in the 1960s, primarily to Miami, New York City, and Los Angeles. The main reasons for Honduran emigration during this period were escape from the poverty conditions of rural areas and from new military regimes. Honduran migration as we know it began in the late 1980s when the economic and political situation in Honduras worsened.

After the 2009 coup, many Jewish-Hondurans immigrated to the US due to a rise in political tension and antisemitism.

=== Present-day ===
Hondurans are one of the biggest Latino communities among Mexicans, Puerto Ricans, Dominicans, and Cubans. The metropolitan areas with the most Honduran-Americans are Houston, New York City, Miami, Indiana, and Washington, D.C. Some Hondurans have undertaken business ventures such as the opening coffee shops, while others take advantage of their university studies to provide services to the American society. Many Hondurans migrated legally, and many joined other Central American migrants in 2018 in the migrant caravan. The caravan followed the Honduran political crisis and the electoral fraud of Juan Orlando Hernández, who was accused of corruption, political repression and the rise of drug cartels.

== Causes ==
Different historians, sociologists, and politologists have made different hypotheses for the cause of the Honduran migrations, some point to the institutional corruption, others point to the fact that Honduras is still controlled by a tiny oligarchy that has a monopoly on the country, others expressed that Honduras is the example of the failure of the neo-liberal model and the privatization of state owned industries. However, the most popular hypothesis involves the Honduran economic system and U.S. military interventions during the past decades.

=== Cold War roots ===
Many analysts point out that one of the main, if not the main, factor in the current massive migration of Hondurans beginning in the late 80's early 90's was the United States military occupation in Honduras and its enormous influence on Honduras since the time of the Reagan presidency. The 1980s were a period full of invasion and occupation of U.S. soldiers in Honduran soil during the Central American Crisis.

The United States under the Reagan administration government ordered hundreds of U.S. soldiers that were stationed at the nearby Palmerola Base during that period under the excuse of stopping socialism in Central America. It was another mission of the U.S. to wipe out any communism that was occurring in Honduras. President Reagan saw Honduras as a strategic point to grow U.S. influence in the Region. This event was key to the relationship between the U.S. and Honduras.

=== Ties to American companies ===
Others point out that the start of migration of Hondurans is rooted in U.S. based banana and mining companies such as Standard Fruit Company and Rosario Mining Company. These companies in words of some analysts transformed Honduras in a kind U.S. colony similar to Cuba and Puerto Rico during the early 20th century and companies exploited many of their workers:

"Honduran peasants had no hope of access to their nation's good soil".

Many Honduran-Americans are sons and grandsons of farm laborers who first established themselves in the largest U.S. cities, in which they had support networks from the Honduran-American communities. In the late 1980s and 1990s, most Honduran Americans lived in New Orleans (50,000), New York City (33,000), Los Angeles (24,000), and Miami (18,000). In 2000, Hondurans grew to be the third largest immigrant group from Central America.

== Contributions to American society ==
=== Arts ===
Many Honduran Americans have contributed to the world of art, film, and television, such as Carlos Mencia, José Zúñiga, or America Ferrera, and in fashion, providing Honduran cultural features in their designs. Many young Honduran-Americans study in art institutes various artistic disciplines.

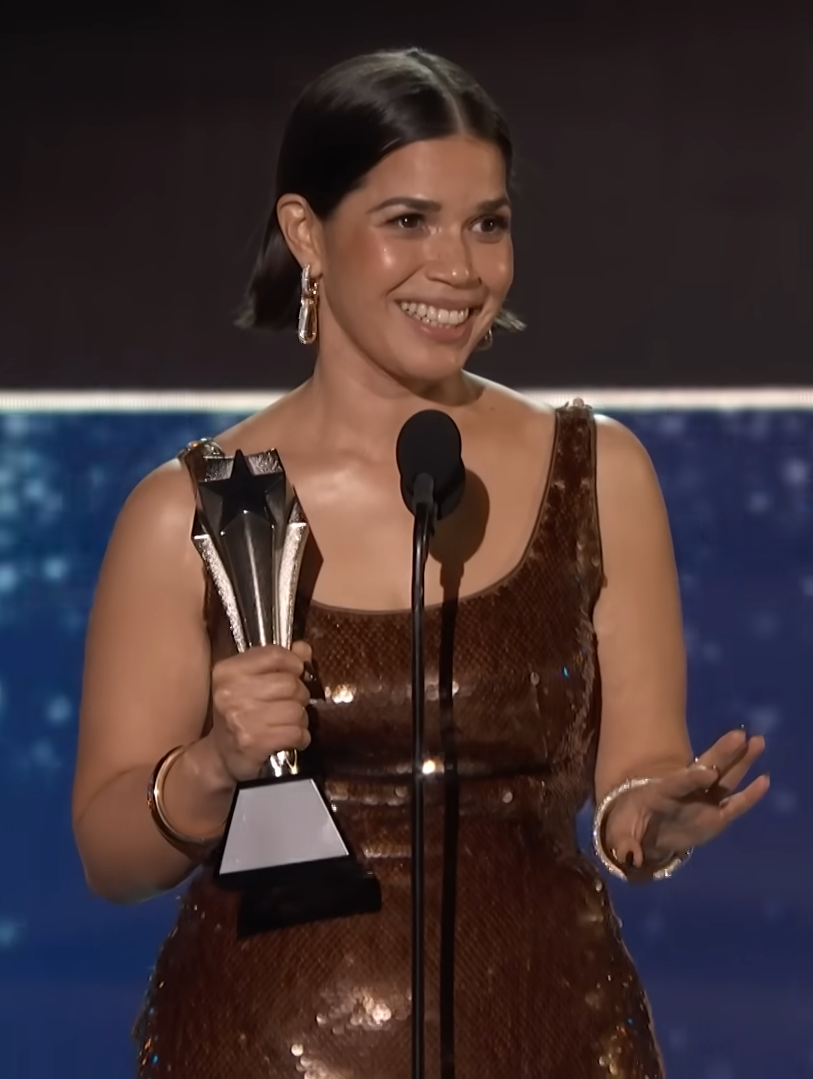
America Ferrera in 2024

=== Music ===
They are two slopes of Honduran music, La Punta, of Afro-Caribbean origin, more originally from the Garifuna population, and marimba music, more connected to the mestizo-criollo identity of the country, however Honduras has its versions of other Latin genres such as salsa. Other Hondurans contributed to rock music, due the boom of rock in Honduras during the 80's and 90's. Rock bands emerged during this period, blending local sounds with international rock influences and carving out a space for Honduran voices in Latin rock. With the rise of reggaeton and Latin urbano, many young Honduran Americans gravitate toward urban genres that reflect bicultural experiences.

This music has enabled them to create new forms of expression by mixing Latin urban beats with themes relevant to their dual identities. Artists experiment with Spanish and English lyrics, blending influences from Honduras and the U.S., thus forming a dynamic genre that resonates with the broader Latino diaspora

=== Military service ===
Honduran-Americans have actively participated in U.S. military service since World War II. Some of them have participated North Africa allied operations, the Pacific War, Normandy, and the occupation of Japan.

A well-known story is that of the Honduran U.S. soldier Luis Alemán Gomez that was part of the Allied occupation forces in Japan. A total of 13.7 percent of native (U.S.) Honduran-American males older than 16 years are in the military. Additionally, 769 Honduran-American non-citizen males serve in the military. Other conflicts where this Honduran Americans participated are the Gulf War, and the Afghan and Iraq wars.

=== Cuisine ===
Honduran American cuisine emphasizes the use of fresh ingredients and exhibits some resemblances to well-known dishes from other Hispanic cultures. Among the staple ingredients favored by Honduran Americans are rice, beans, corn, and flour tortillas, along with plantains, green bananas, various proteins such as chicken, pork, fish, and beef, tropical fruits, and fresh dairy items like cheese and table creams. The Garifuna community also includes cassava as a key staple ingredient. In contrast to Mexican cuisine, Honduran food is typically not spicy; however, individuals may choose to add a spicy condiment sauce to their plates based on personal taste. Additionally, pickled vegetables, referred to as encurtido, are offered as a condiment for meals. Dishes are generally well-seasoned with garlic and a variety of herbs and spices, resulting in a savory profile rather than a sweet one. A quintessential Honduran dish is the baleada, which consists of a folded flour tortilla filled with mashed beans and cheese or a Honduran cream known as mantequilla.

== Socioeconomics ==
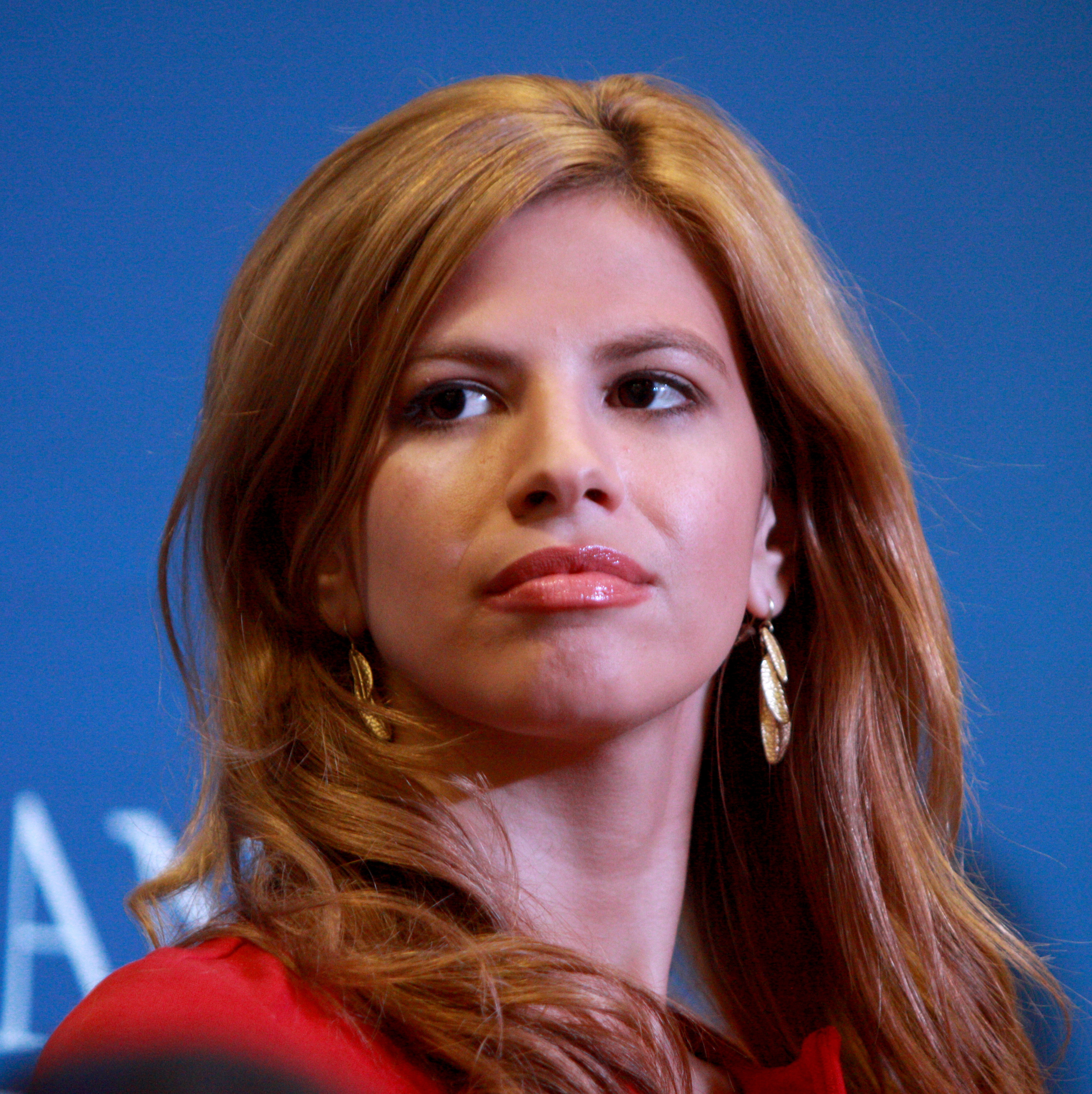
Michelle Fields political journalist who formerly wrote for The Huffington Post.

Usually, Honduran-Americans live in areas with high economic growth and demand for employment in construction, domestic services, and other industries. Another part of Hondurans look for businesses, the most common being to create local restaurants where traditional food from their country can be served. These businesses are found in various cities in America.Others do business selling services such as repairs and maintenance, actively contributing to the American economy Many Honduran-Americans suffer discrimination, as other Hispanic groups do especially Afro-Hondurans.

Honduran-American girls tend to spend more years in school than Honduran-Americans boys, in part due to pressure by their families on boys to start working at age 12 or 14. A total of 1,091 Honduran-Americans have a master's degree graduated in U.S. colleges, 862 have other professional degrees, and 151 have a doctoral degree. The majority of these individuals are women.

== Demographics ==
The Honduran population is extremely diverse and, although it has a well-established Latino identity in the US, it lacks homogeneity. Most Hondurans, including Honduran-Americans, have a predominantly mestizo genetic makeup, that is, a mix of Spanish and indigenous ancestry to varying degrees. However, there are also other important ethnic groups, such as people of African descent, indigenous peoples, and those with Arab or other European ancestry. Recent studies have shown that the majority of Hondurans share a significant number of genetic patterns with the populations of the Iberian Peninsula and Italy. A 2021 genetic study of Honduran Americans found an average of 40% European, 39% Indigenous, and 21% African ancestry.

According to the 2010 United States census there are 633,401 Hondurans living in the United States. By 2011, the number of Hondurans estimated to reside in the United States by the Census Bureau's American Community Survey was 702,000. In 2014, according to Pew Research, "60% of 573,000 Honduran immigrants in the U.S. are unauthorized".

According to the 2020 census, there were 1,061,585 Honduran Americans living in the U.S.

The 10 U.S. states with the largest Honduran populations in 2020 are:

1. Texas – 168,578 (0.5% of the state population)
2. Florida – 153,308 (0.7% of the state population)
3. California – 102,491 (0.2% of the state population)
4. New York – 93,056 (0.4% of the state population)
5. North Carolina – 57,822 (0.5% of the state population)
6. Louisiana – 55,915 (1.2% of the state population)
7. New Jersey – 55,819 (0.5% of the state population)
8. Virginia – 53,664 (0.6% of the state population)
9. Maryland – 44,183 (0.7% of the state population)
10. Georgia – 31,832 (0.2% of the state population)

According to ACS estimates For 2017-2021, there were 684,000 Honduran immigrants in the United States of America, the top counties of which were:

1) Harris County, Texas -‐-----‐------------------‐ 71,500

2) Miami - Dade County, Florida --‐-----‐----- 46,800

3) Los Angeles County, California ----------- 35,700

4) Dallas County, Texas --------------------------- 18,600

5) Jefferson Parish, Louisiana ---------------- 17,000

6) Mecklenburg County, N.C. ------------------- 14,300

7) Broward County, Florida ---------------------- 13,900

8) Bronx County, New York -------------------- 12,600

9) Palm Beach County, Florida ------------------- 9,800

10) Queens Borough, New York ------------------ 8,500

11) Suffolk County, New York --------------------- 8,000

12) Nassau County, New York -------------------- 8,000

13) Prince George's County, Maryland -------- 7,800

14) Fairfax County, Virginia ------------------------- 7,700

15) Cook County, Illinois ------------------------------ 7,400

16) Montgomery County, Maryland ---‐--------- 7,100

17) Hudson County, New Jersey ----------------- 7,000

18) Travis County, Texas ----------------------------- 6,700

19) Brooklyn Borough, New York ---------------- 6,600

20) Gwinnett County, Georgia --------------------- 6,600

21) Suffolk County, Massachusetts -----‐------ 6,100

22) Hillsborough County, Florida ----------------- 6,100

23) Bexar County, Texas ------------------------------ 6,000

24) Tarrant County, Texas -----------------------‐---- 5,100

25) Davidson County, Tennessee ---------------- 4,800

== Notable people ==
- Hope Portocarrero – socialite, former First Lady of Nicaragua.
- Ronnie Aguilar – basketball player
- David Archuleta – runner-up of American Idol Season 7
- Elexa Bahr — soccer player
- Michael Benjamin (investor) – private investor focusing on Internet companies; was a Republican candidate for the United States Senate in 2004
- Kevin Bonilla — soccer player
- Caron Bowman — designer
- Chloe Bridges — actress
- Harold Calderon — professional boxer
- Alessandro Castro – soccer player
- Teofilo Colon Jr. – photographer, filmmaker, writer, and journalist
- Gabriel Chavarria — actor
- Dillon Danis — mixed marcial artist
- Bianca Del Rio – actor, comedian, costume designer, and drag queen
- Evil E — disc jockey
- Brandon Escobar – wrestler
- Empress Of – singer
- Kat Fajardo – author
- America Ferrera – film actress (Real Women Have Curves, The Sisterhood of the Traveling Pants, Ugly Betty)
- Michelle Fields – political journalist, Huffington Post contributor
- Brian Flores – former Head Coach for the Miami Dolphins
- Illich Guardiola – American actor
- Ali Hall – soccer player
- Dewan Hernandez – basketball player
- Maximiliano Hernández – film actor (Captain America: The Winter Soldier, Sicario, The Last Ship)
- Maity Interiano – journalist, entertainment reporter and television producer
- Melique Garcia — sprinter
- Skai Jackson – actress
- Omar Khan - American football executive, General Manager of the Pittsburgh Steelers
- Teófimo López – professional boxer, world lightweight champion since 2020
- Isabella Lovestory – singer
- Karrie Martin – actress
- Walmer Martinez – soccer player
- Annia Mejia – soccer player
- Daniel and Luis Moncada – actors, best known for Breaking Bad
- Juan Carlos Obregón Jr. – soccer player
- Brina Palencia – voice actress, ADR director, and singer primarily known for her work for Funimation Entertainment/OkraTron 5000.
- Richard Perdomo — soccer player
- Schoolboy Q – rapper
- Francia Raisa – actress
- David Ruiz – soccer player
- Taxstone – television and podcast personality
- Andres Serrano – photographer and artist who has become notorious through his photos of corpses and his use of feces and bodily fluids in his work. He is of Honduran and Afro-American descent.
- Demi Singleton — actress, singer, and dancer
- Hype Williams – Billboard and MTV VMA award-winning music video and film director
- Mirna Valerio — runner
- Steve Van Buren — Hall of Fame American gridiron football player
- Sauce Walka – rapper
- Sha EK – rapper born in Melrose, Bronx
- Renán Almendárez Coello - Radio Personality

== See also ==
- Honduras–United States relations
- Hondurans in New Orleans
- History of Central Americans in Los Angeles
