= Jamie Weinstein =

American writer

- Born: Allentown, Pennsylvania, U.S.
- Education: Cornell University; London School of Economics
- Occupation: Political journalist

Jamie Weinstein is an American political journalist, opinion commentator, and satirist. He currently hosts The Dispatch podcast on Mondays and formerly hosted The Jamie Weinstein Show podcast, which was at one time a National Review Online podcast.

== Early life and education ==
Weinstein was born in Allentown, Pennsylvania. He grew up in Palm Beach Gardens, Florida. He attended Cornell University, where he graduated in 2006 with a BA in history and government. He later attended the London School of Economics, where he received a MS in the history of international relations.

== Career ==
Weinstein's work has appeared in The Weekly Standard, The Daily Beast, Rolling Stone, and The Daily Caller, where he served in the early years of the publication as senior editor. Weinstein has appeared regularly on MSNBC, Fox News, Hannity, HBO's Real Time with Bill Maher, Morning Joe, Your World with Neil Cavuto, America's Newsroom, Fox and Friends, and Red Eye w/Greg Gutfeld.

In 2011, Weinstein won the Funniest Celebrity in Washington, D.C. stand-up comedy competition.

In 2012, Weinstein co-wrote (with Will Rahn) a satirical novella called The Lizard King: The Shocking Inside Account of Obama's True Intergalactic Ambitions by an Anonymous White House Staffer, which was published by HarperCollins. Reviewing the book, the Wall Street Journal concluded: "Funny, scurrilous and completely forgettable: This is political satire at its best. Or worst. I'm not sure which."

In early 2016, Weinstein gave a speech in favor of Virginia governor Jim Gilmore's presidential candidacy at an Iowa caucus for a story. He was not a supporter of Gilmore's candidacy.

=== The Churchill Tommy Gun Society ===
In 2013, Weinstein started The Churchill Tommy Gun Society, a dinner society that brings together some of Washington's more notable young reporters and commentators with prominent special guests from the world of media, politics and business for an off-the-record evening of dinner and drinks at his D.C. residence. He hosts the dinners with his wife, Michelle Fields.

Special guests have included Democratic and Republican presidential contenders like Cory Booker, Chris Christie, Ted Cruz, Marco Rubio and Amy Klobuchar; former CIA directors like David Petraeus and Michael Hayden; presidential confidantes like Valerie Jarrett, Roger Stone, Rahm Emanuel and Karl Rove; cable news luminaries like Joe Scarborough and Tucker Carlson; presidential cabinet members like John Bolton and Ben Carson; and billionaire businessmen like Apple CEO Tim Cook, JP Morgan CEO Jamie Dimon, Mark Cuban, former Google CEO Eric Schmidt, tech investor Peter Thiel, Endeavor CEO Ari Emanuel and co-Chairman of News Corp Lachlan Murdoch, among many others.

=== The Jamie Weinstein Show ===
In 2016, Weinstein launched The Jamie Weinstein Show, a podcast that featured in-depth interviews with Tucker Carlson, Ta-Nehisi Coates, Thomas Sowell, Sen. Tom Cotton, Roger Stone, Bill Ayers, Thomas Ravenel, Mark Cuban, Andrew Sullivan, David Brooks, Ben Smith, Don Lemon, Ezra Klein, Brian Stelter, Bret Stephens, George Will, Sen. Ted Cruz, John Bolton, H.R. McMaster, and others.

In March 2018, The New York Times praised the show as a rare political podcast that features "deep but respectful disagreement." News broken on the show is regularly written up in publications like Politico, the Washington Post, FoxNews.com, Business Insider and CNBC.

The show was placed on hiatus since 2021.

=== The Dispatch ===
Weinstein returned to podcasting in October 2023 as the host of the Monday edition of The Dispatch, a podcast. As of August 2025 he had departed the podcast.

=== JMW Productions ===
During the COVID-19 pandemic, Weinstein and his wife started a production company, JMW Productions. In January 2024, the first project, a podcast in collaboration with iHeartMedia called Finding Matt Drudge, was launched. The podcast broke into the top 10 of Apple's rankings of news podcasts and was included in Apple's "New and Noteworthy" section.

== Personal life ==
In May 2016, Weinstein became engaged to former Huffington Post political journalist Michelle Fields. The two were married on June 24, 2017.
