= Michelle Fields =

American political journalist

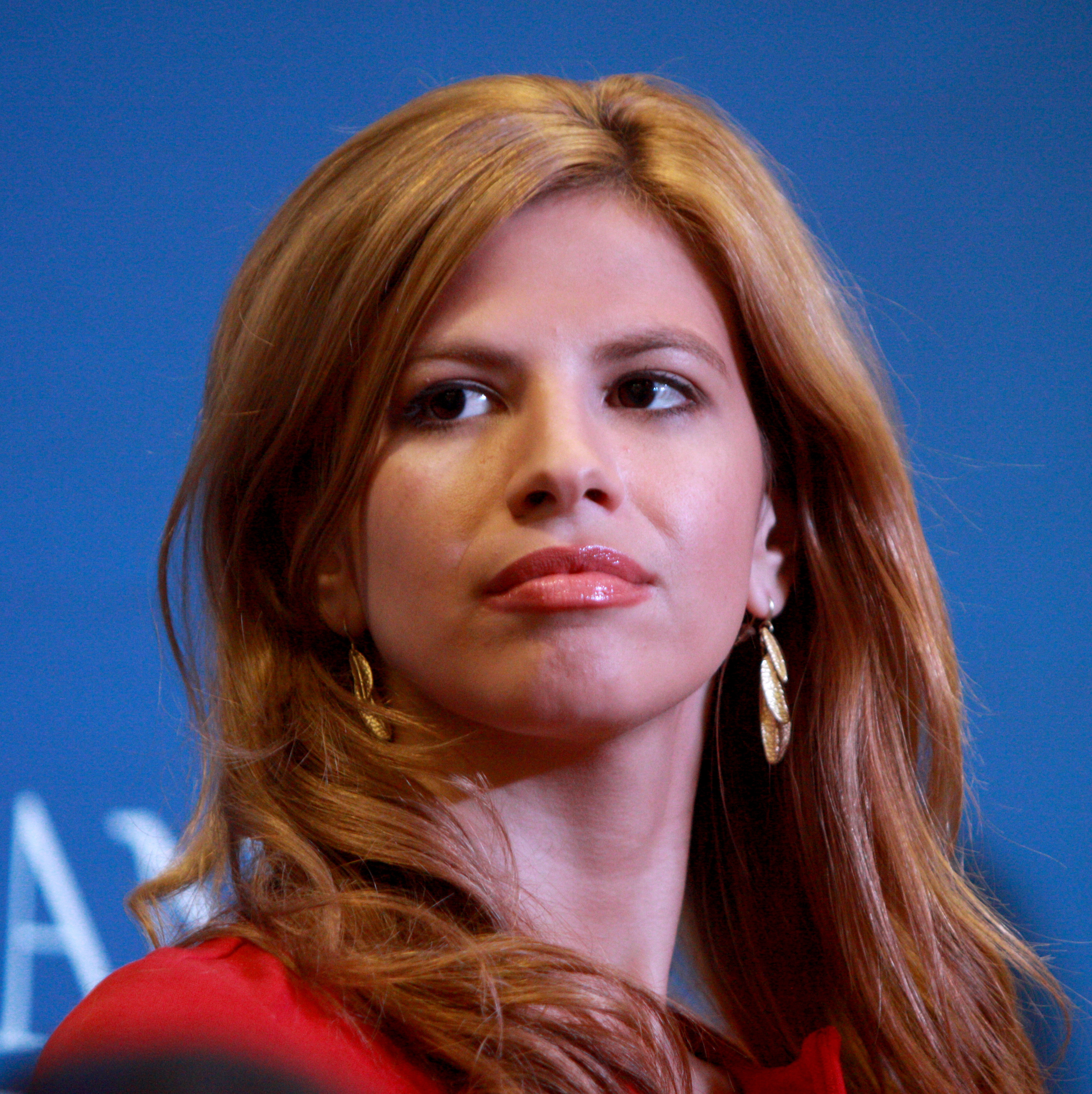
- Fields in 2013
- Born: 1987 or 1988 (age 38–39); United States
- Education: Pepperdine University (BA)
- Occupation: Political journalist
- Years active: 2011–present
- Employer: The Huffington Post
- Spouse: Jamie Weinstein (m. 2017)

Michelle Fields (born 1987/1988) is an American political journalist who formerly wrote for The Huffington Post and was a reporter for Reason TV and Breitbart News, as well as a Fox News contributor. After graduating from college, Fields was hired as a reporter at The Daily Caller. She later became a correspondent for PJ Media. Fields is a former panelist on the Fox News program Cashin' In. In 2016, Fields accused Donald Trump's campaign manager Corey Lewandowski of grabbing her arm at a press conference. At the time, Fields was a reporter for Breitbart, but resigned her position in March 2016, due to the organization's handling of the Lewandowski incident.

== Early life and education ==
Fields was raised in the Los Angeles area and attended Calabasas High School in Calabasas, California. Fields is of partial Honduran descent, and is the daughter of television and film writer Greg Fields.

She studied political science at Pepperdine University, graduating in 2011. She served as the president of the Pepperdine chapter of Students For Liberty, a libertarian student organization.

== Journalism career ==
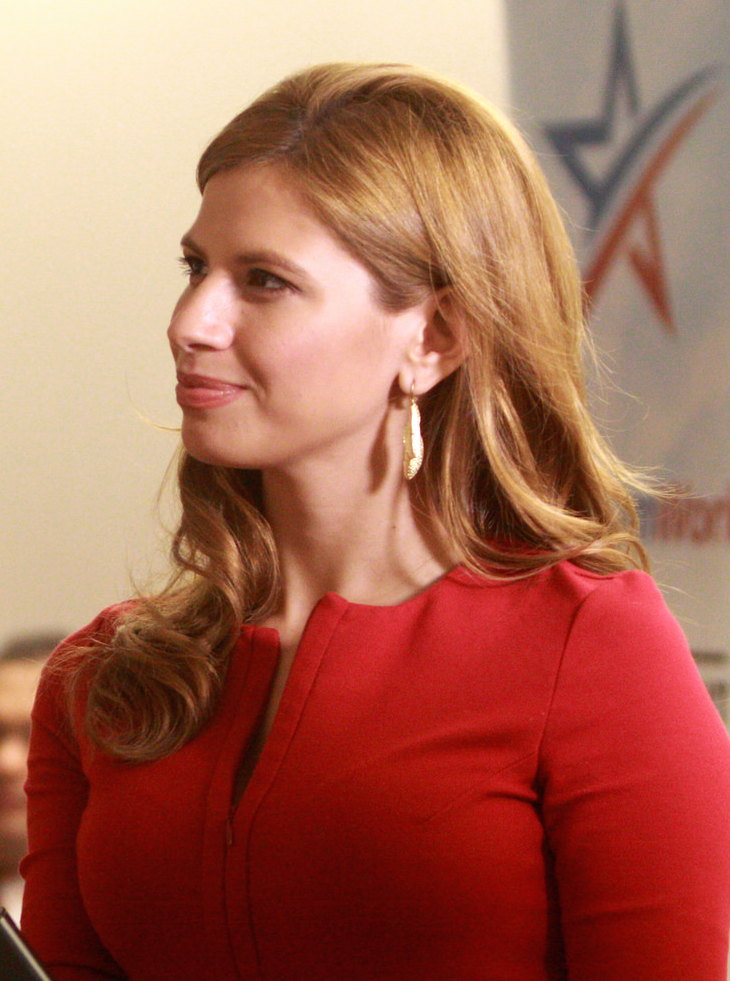
Fields at the Young Americans for Liberty National Convention at George Mason University in Arlington, Virginia.

Upon graduating from Pepperdine University in 2011, Fields gained national attention after having a confrontation with actor Matt Damon over teacher tenure reform. Fields films and edits her videos in a citizen journalism style.

Fields has appeared on CNBC, Sky News, Fox News, Hannity, The O'Reilly Factor, Fox and Friends First, Your World with Neil Cavuto, America's Newsroom, Fox and Friends, America Live with Megyn Kelly, Stossel, and Red Eye w/Greg Gutfeld. Fields was featured in Details magazine as one of "the next wave of political pundits".

Fields later became a correspondent for PJ Media.

In 2012, Fields gave a TEDx talk on her career and the future of Internet journalism. In 2015, The Hill named her one of the 50 most beautiful people in Washington, D. C.

In September 2014, Fields became a contributor at Fox News.

In May 2016, Fields became a reporter at The Huffington Post. She published a book, Barons of the Beltway: Inside the Princely World of our Washington Elite, in June 2016. The book was quickly edited close to the time of release in order to include an accounting of Fields' incident involving the Trump campaign.

Fields is a former panelist on the Fox News program Cashin' In.

=== Allegations against Corey Lewandowski ===
Fields filed a police report with the Jupiter Police Department in 2016 on March 11, alleging simple battery. Fields resigned from Breitbart News on March 13, 2016, citing the organization's handling of the matter. On March 29, 2016, Lewandowski was charged with simple battery by the Jupiter Police Department, and turned himself in.

On April 14, Palm Beach County State Attorney Dave Aronberg filed court documents saying that his office would not prosecute Lewandowski. Prosecutors determined that "there was probable cause to make an arrest", and "the facts support the allegation that Mr. Lewandowski did grab Ms. Fields' arm against her will", but that "the evidence cannot prove all legally required elements of the crime alleged and is insufficient to support a criminal prosecution".

== Personal life ==
Fields became engaged to Jamie Weinstein, senior editor of The Daily Caller, in late May 2016. They married on June 24, 2017.
