= Ellis Stratakos =

Greek American jazz trombonist (1903–1961)

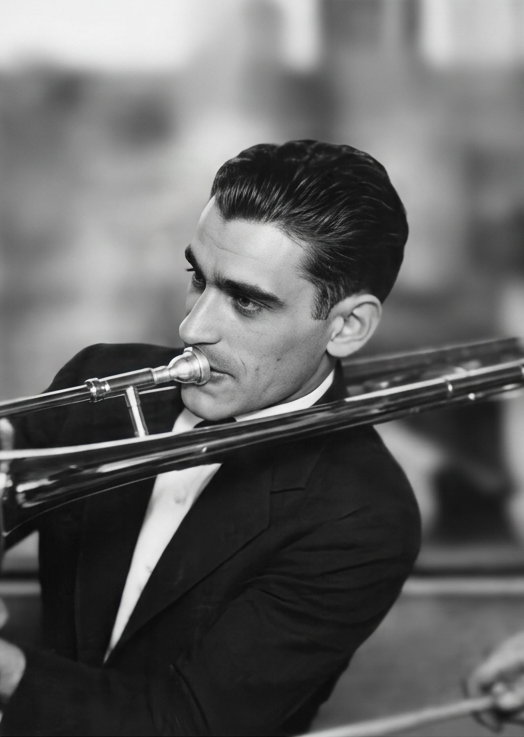
- Ellis in the early 1920s
- Born: Ellis George Stratakos; December 1, 1903; New Orleans, Louisiana, U.S.
- Died: January 25, 1961 (aged 57); Gulfport, Mississippi
- Resting place: Greenwood Cemetery, New Orleans
- Education: Jesuit College in New Orleans
- Occupations: Musician; Bandleader
- Spouse: Sadye Rogillio (m. 1923)
- Musical career
- Genres: Jazz; Dixieland; swing; blues; traditional pop
- Instruments: Violin; trombone; drums
- Years active: 1919–1940
- Label: OKeh

Ellis Stratakos (December 1, 1903 – January 25, 1961) was a Greek American band leader, trombonist, violinist, and drummer. He performed jazz music on the Gulf Coast and became known as a Gulf Coast jazz musician. He was associated with multiple bands as a leader, namely the Gulf Coast Jazzers, Pine Hills Orchestra, Buena Vista Orchestra, and Hotel Jung Orchestra. One of the earliest bands he was associated with was the Dixieland Roamers, where he played trombone. He also participated in several professional recordings of jazz music in the 1920s for Okeh Records, performing with the trombone for Johnny De Droit, Oliver Naylor, and Tony Parenti.

Ellis was born in New Orleans, Louisiana, to Louis Stratakos and Mary Louise Sophia Gruner. His father, Louis, was from Sparta, Greece. From an early age, Ellis showed an interest in jazz music. Growing up in Storyville, he was exposed to the new emerging music performed by black musicians. By the early 1920s, he briefly played drums in several bands, then switched to trombone before traveling to New York to perform with Johnny De Droit at the Balconades Ballroom. He eventually returned to Biloxi, Miss, by 1925, where he created a musical presence for himself performing with his different bands in the local region until 1928, despite their frequent national tours. By 1929, his band was performing at the Jung Hotel in New Orleans, a venue they booked for one year. Ellis also traveled to Memphis, Tennessee, in the early 1930s, frequently performing at the Memphis Silver Slipper.

Upon his death, his wife donated his belongings to the New Orleans Jazz Museum in 1961, including his trombone and mute. Ellis was honored by the Grand Lodge of the Mississippi Odd Fellows as Grand Patriarch. He was the secretary of the American Federation of Musicians Local 174 at the time of his death. He was buried at Greenwood Cemetery, in the city of New Orleans, Louisiana, where he was born, grew up, and thrived as a jazz musician.

== Early life (1919-1925) ==
Ellis George Stratakos was born in New Orleans, Louisiana, on December 1, 1903, to candy shop owner Louis Stratakos and Mary Louise Sophia Gruner. His father, Louis, was from Sparta, Greece, and his mother's parents were both from Germany. From a young age, Ellis frequented Storyville's red-light district, attending a bar owned by John Peg Anstedt, where young musicians made it their headquarters while roaming Storyville listening to outstanding black musicians. Lulu White's tavern was also active during this period. The young man was attracted to the underground rebellious music known as jazz from an early age. Storyville was popular and bustling with jazz musicians until it was shut down on Nov. 12, 1917, but continued to flourish illegally. He eventually attended the Jesuit College in New Orleans.

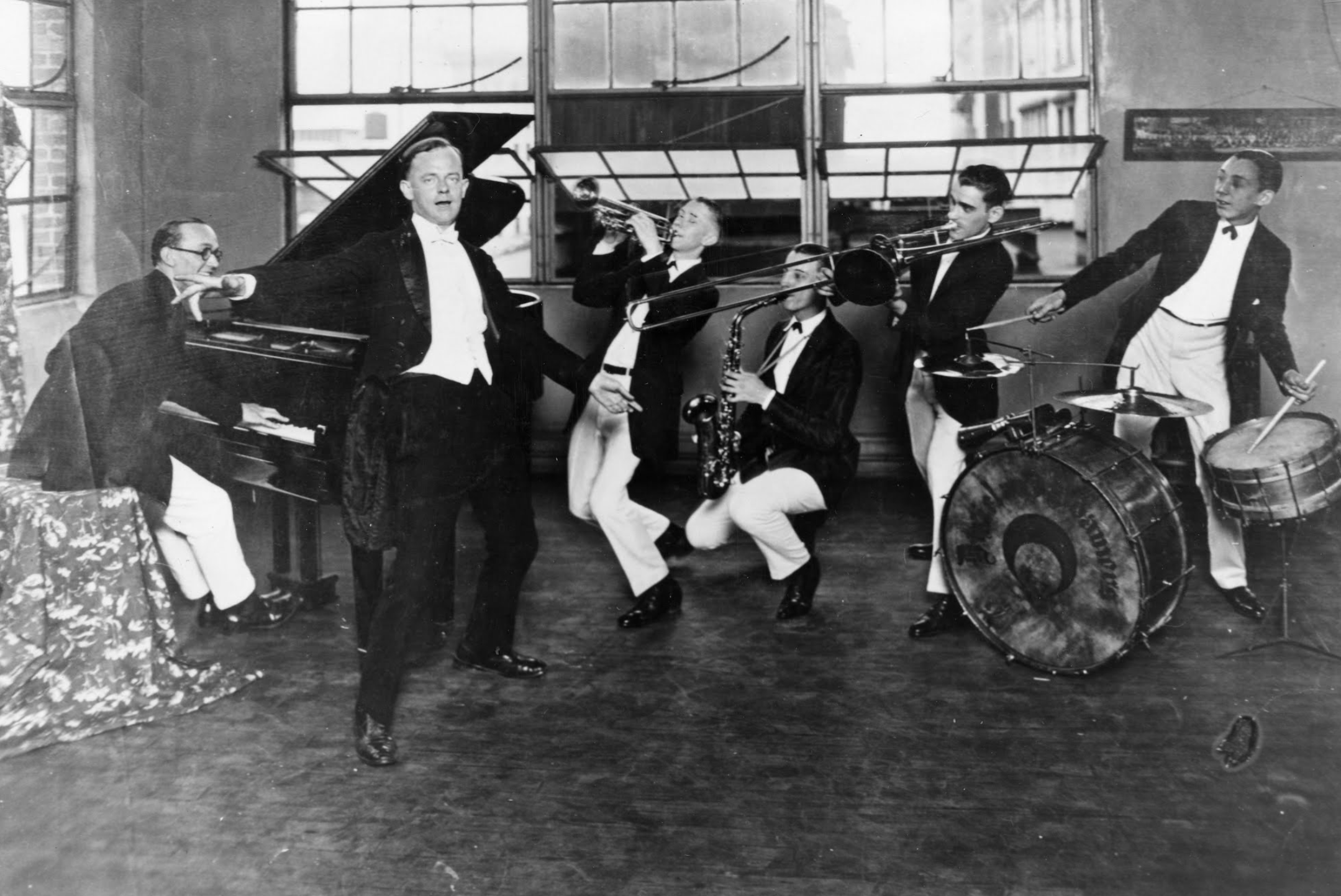
Dixieland Roamers featuring Frank Mutz (piano), Ed McCarthey, Pinkey Gerbrech (trumpet), Eddie Powers (saxophone), Ellis Stratakos (trombone), and Ray Bauduc (drums).

The family migrated to Gulfport, Mississippi, where his father, Louis, opened a candy shop while Ellis was still attending school in New Orleans. In 1919, at the age of 16, Ellis was a member of the Gulfport Band led by and managed by Johnny Bertucci. The band was called the Imperial Jazz Band of Biloxi. It played various local venues, including the Elks Club dance in January 1920. Members of the band included Ellis (drums), Joe Loyocano (trombone), Avery Loposser (piano), Harry Tauzin (clarinet), and Johnny Bertucci, who was the leader and manager.

Ellis eventually became a prominent figure in the Gulf Coast jazz scene. Ellis began to play the trombone, and by August 1921, he was playing with Ray Bauduc's Dixieland Roamers, which was originally called the Nola Jazzers. It was the first band to broadcast live Dixieland in New Orleans. The band was: Ed Cathy, vocals; Pinky Gerbecht, trumpet; Ellis Stratakos, trombone; Eddie Powers, c-melody saxophone; Frank Mutz, piano; and Ray Bauduc, drums. Ellis married Sarah Rogillio during the same period on December 22, 1923.

Ellis was now a professional trombone player well known among jazz musicians. Johnny De Droit was performing in New York City and specifically requested Ellis to replace Russ Papalia (trombone) in his band as early as September 1924. At this time, Johnny De Droit was playing at the Balconades Ballroom in New York around Columbus Circle. His band recorded Eccentric on October 29, 1924, and Lucky Kentucky and When My Sugar Walks Down the Street on January 12, 1925, featuring Ellis on trombone. In the interim, De Droit visited Fletcher Henderson and saw Louis Armstrong, whom he recommended that he get his own band and become a bandleader, which Louis eventually did.

Ellis continued to flourish with his band in Biloxi, Miss, now known as the Original Gulf Coast Jazzers. He played dance venues such as the Pavilion of the Hotel Riviera in Biloxi, Miss., during the summer of 1925. By early 1926, his band added well-known saxophone and clarinet player F. J. Curly Lizana (1903–1983).

== Biloxi and Gulf Coast Jazz (1926-1928) ==
Ellis began to form a presence in the Gulf Coast jazz scene, frequently performing in the lobbies and ballrooms of Biloxi's major hotels, tho his band did not have the same name for long. Between 1926 and 1928, Ellis gained experience as a performer. The year 1927 is possibly when Ellis performed the most across different venues.

The year 1926 began with performances at the Edge Water Park Pavilion around April, and the band was using the name Gulf Coast Jazzers. By May of 1926, the band secured a seasonal gig at the iconic Buena Vista Hotel in Biloxi, Mississippi. The band now took on the name of the Buena Vista Orchestra and some of the performers included Eddie Powers, who played saxophone and clarinet with Ray Miller's Orchestra, A. Hahn or (Sock Kahn), who played with the Battle House orchestra playing saxophone and violin, and Emanuel Nichelson on saxophone and clarinet. Others included: Johnny Wiggs, Louis Prima, and Irving Fazola During that same summer, Ellis and his band performed on boat tours on the Mississippi Sound off the coast of Biloxi to the Isle of Caprice.

By November of 1926, his band was playing at the Hotel Avelez in Biloxi, Miss, before they set off on a 14-week jazz tour in three cars. By now, Ellis was listed as a violin and trombone player. Some of the members of the band included: Joe Fallo (piano), Tony Fallo (banjo), Sock Kahn (saxophone), Emanual Nichelson (saxophone), Sharkey Bonano aka Joe Sharkey (trumpet), and Ben Dablen (drums).

On Ellis' return from the long tour, he booked a frequent performance gig for his band at the Polka Dot Ballroom located at the City Park Pavilion in Biloxi, Mississippi, in January and February of 1927, and also continued to perform at the venue throughout the year. During that same period, Ellis and his band performed at the Pine Hills Hotel resort at the Bay of St. Louis in Pass Christian, Mississippi. The band became known as The Pine Hills Orchestra. At this point, Ellis may have had multiple bands, including the Gulf Coast Jazzers. Due to the multiple venues at different hotels and clubs, news sources would sometimes use party, hotel, or nightclub band names instead of the Gulf Coast Jazzers, with Ellis as the band leader. The bands continued to perform at venues such as the Hotel Avelez and the Pavilion of the Hotel Riviera in Biloxi, Miss, during the winter of 1927.

In March, the jazz musician secured performances at the Rendezvous Supper Club in Biloxi, Miss. In the spring, the band performed at Saenger Strand Theatre in Gulfport, Miss, and Cuevas Pavilion in Pass Christian, Mississippi. By the summer of 1927, the band arranged another hotel venue at the Markham Hotel in Gulfport, Miss. By the fall of that same year, Ellis is listed for the first time with his wife, Sadie Rogillio, performing a piano and violin solo.

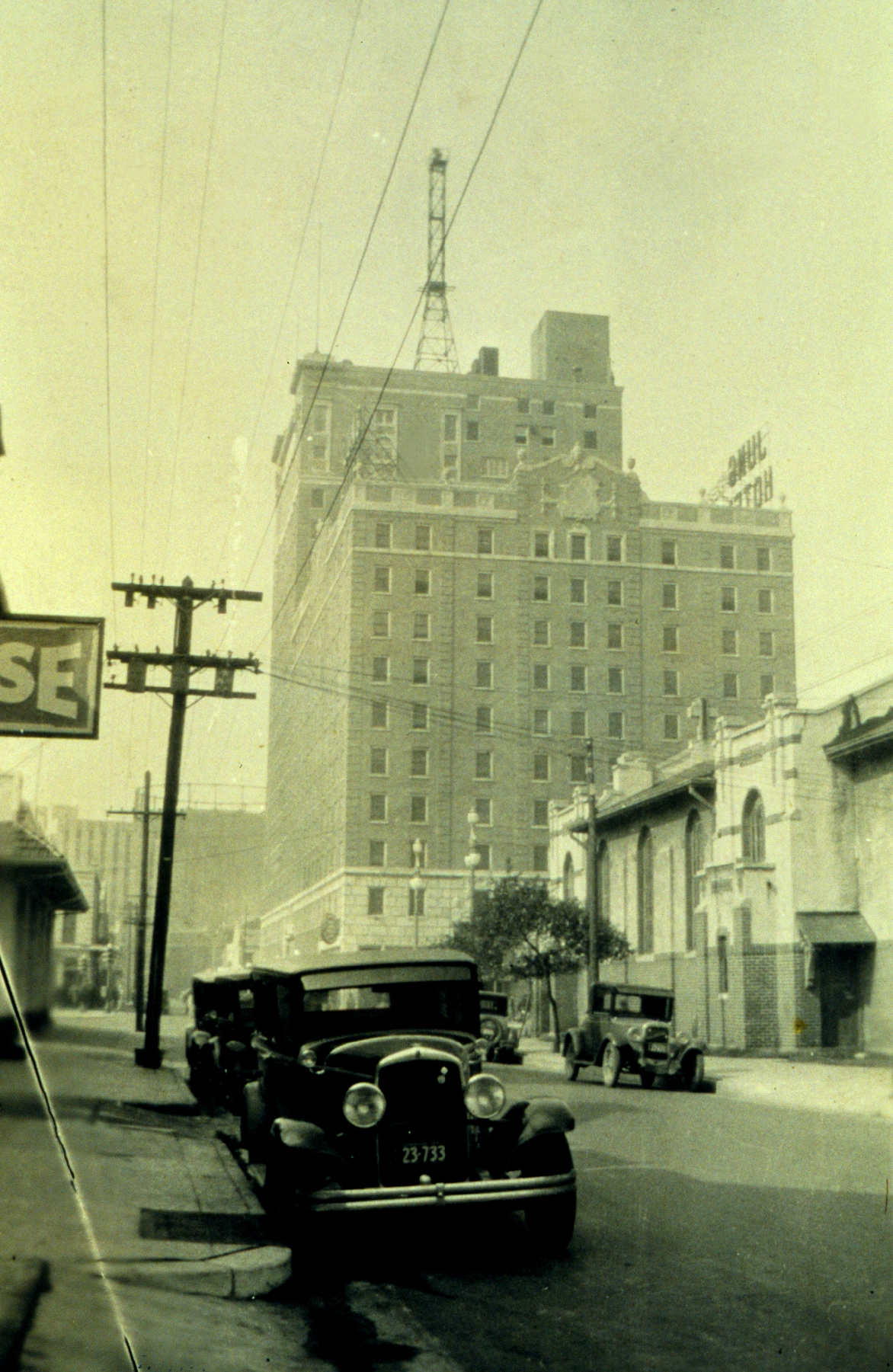
Jung Hotel in the early 1930s with broadcast antenna on top of building.

In 1928, he played trombone on a record by Tony Parenti's New Orleanians in New Orleans on April 27, 1928. The tracks were In The Dungeon and When You And I Were Pals. The musicians were John Hyman aka Johnny Wiggs (cornet), Ellis Stratakos (trombone), Tony Parenti (alto clarinet), Buzzy Williams (piano), Jack Brian (vocals and guitar), and Monk Hazel (drums and vocals).

That same year, in 1928, Ellis was recorded as the orchestra leader of a band performing at the Peabody Hotel in Memphis, Tennessee. He also performed at a special function featuring actress Mae Murray at the Pantages Theatre in the same city. The theater was popular and known for its vaudeville acts and silent films. By the fall of 1928, Ellis returned to his hometown of New Orleans and began performing small gigs, and in November, he secured a one-year deal to perform at the newly opened Hotel Jung Roof Garden.

== Jung Hotel rooftop ==
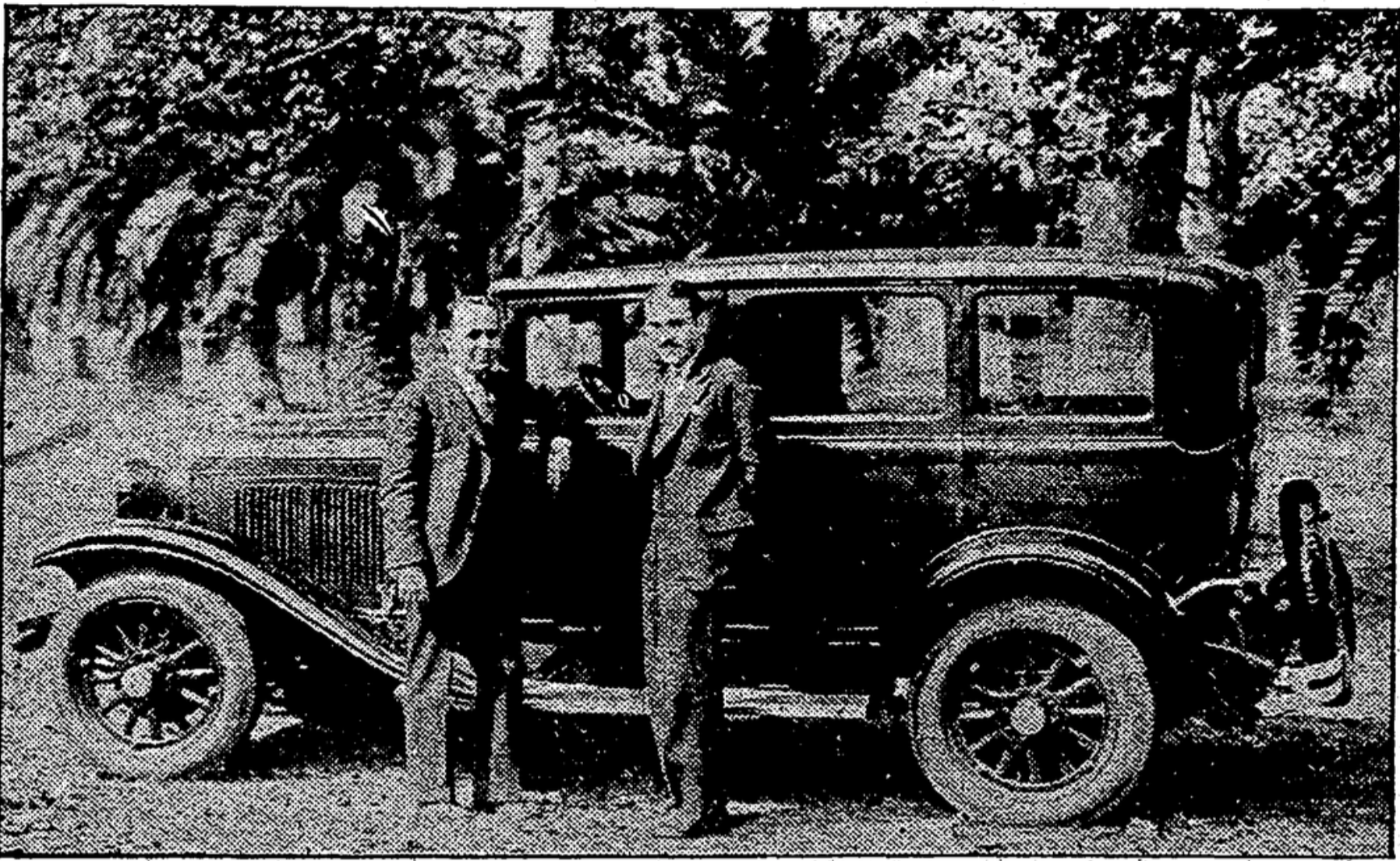
Band leader Ellis Stratakos promoting a Plymouth 4 door sedan in 1929.

On Saturday, November 24, 1928, the 18-Story Annex of the Jung Hotel opened in New Orleans, Louisiana. Ellis had now become a mature musician with over ten years under his belt, initially playing drums, violin, and trombone, and on some occasions vocals. He also recorded several tracks along with well-known bands. His next adventure was performing at the Roof Garden of the newly opened Jung Hotel. His band initially began performing in November 1928. The early members were himself, Joe Loyocano, John Reininger, Edward Powers, John Hyman, Howard Reed, Dave Fridge, Joseph Wolf, Al Hessemer, Fred Christian, and Van Gammon. The Jung Hotel Orchestra performed music for the New Orleans local radio station WDSU as early as January 4th, 1929, playing from 12 pm to 2 pm in the Florentine Room. The band was also in a massive advertisement for Werlein's Band Instruments; they were also called the Top o the Towners on January 13, 1929.

Ellis Stratakos & His Hotel Jung Orchestra's A Precious Little Thing Called Love

By February of 1929, Ellis Stratakos and his Jung Hotel Orchestra recorded A Precious Little Thing Called Love and Weary River. The members of the band on the recording were John Hyman (Wiggs) (cornet), Howard Reed (cornet), Ellis Stratakos (leader & trombone), John Reininger (alto saxophone), Joe Loyacano (alto saxophone), Eddie Powers (tenor saxophone), Joe Wolf (piano), Fred Loyacano (guitar and vocals), Dave Fridge, (bass saxophone) and Von Gannon (drums).

In the fall on October 27, 1929, Ellis Stratakos' likeness was used to promote the 1929 Plymouth four-door sedan, in which he is in a notable picture with Earl Crumb, a representative of Fortson Motors, which was in New Orleans on 1815 Canal Street. Ellis Stratakos and his Jung Hotel Orchestra performed at the Jung Hotel until January 12, 1930, for close to 14 months. By late January 1930, his band was replaced by Al Strieman's Oreo Orchestra.

== Later years (1930-1940) ==
After a long residency at the Jung Hotel, Ellis and his band began performing at the New Wayside Inn on West Beach Boulevard in Biloxi, Mississippi, in the early part of 1930, along with a blues singer named Rita De Lano. Other performers included Steve and Mac with Tony Bileci. By the summer of 1930, he was back putting on shows at the Saenger Strand Theatre in Gulfport, Miss, featuring a ten-piece orchestra performing hot numbers. Other performers were Miss Jessie James, Dorothy Day, Steve and Mack, Paula, and Genevieve. Ellis Stratakos and His Gulf Club Orchestra presented a special musical program over Radio Station WGCM in September 1930, along with pianist Steve Gilbert, Dorothy Day, and Frank J. Kroulik, who were singers. Ellis and his band were now destined to play at the iconic Memphis Jazz club known as the Memphis Silver Slipper for the 1931 season in Memphis, Tennessee, while also performing at the Robert E. Lee Hotel Roof Garden in Jackson, Mississippi, during the summer of 1931.

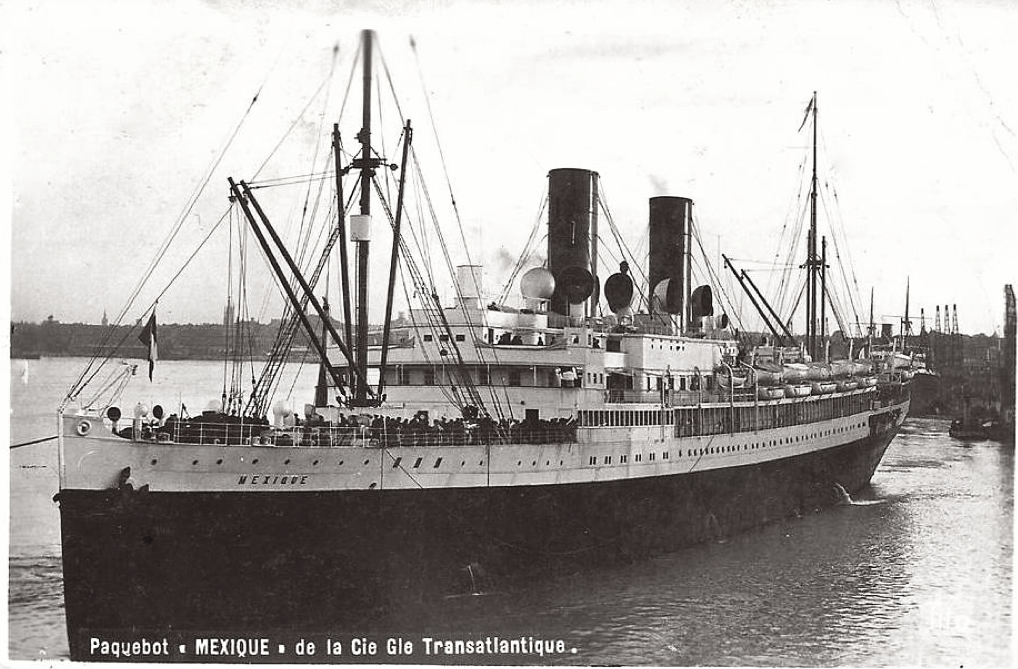
The ocean liner Mexique where Ellis performed from Feb 26, 1936 to Mar 17, 1936.

During this period, the band also visited New York, and Ellis performed at the Balconades Ballroom again. The artist continued to perform in Memphis in 1932. In August of 1934, he is listed as playing the Cotton Exposition at Gulfport, where his band was performing on the radio, and in March of 1936, he performed on the passenger steamship Mexique out of New Orleans, destined for Mexico City, Veracruz, Cristobal, Kingston, and Havana. Later that same year, he performed at the Y.M.B.C. (Young Men's Business Club) Annual Charity Minstrel Show. He reappeared performing for the same organization in 1940 at the Great Southern Hotel in Gulfport, Mississippi.

That same year, he was honored as Grand Patriarch of the Grand Lodge of the Mississippi Odd Fellows' 100th annual meeting, and for the remainder of his life, the musician was active as part of the American Federation of Musicians Local 174, where he eventually became secretary of the union. Sadly, he died at the age of 57 in Gulfport, Mississippi, and was buried in Greenwood Cemetery, New Orleans, Louisiana. Upon his death, his surviving wife, Sadie, donated his trombone and mute to the New Orleans Jazz Museum in 1961.

== See also ==
- Johnny Otis
- Michele Stratico

== Bibliography ==
- Frangos, Steve (April 16, 2026). "Remembering Stratakos Early Jazz Musician" (PDF). Modern Greek Studies Association (MGSA). Archived (PDF) from the original on November 30, 2025.
- Koenig, Karl (2016). "Collection of Jazz Articles Dolly" (PDF). Basinstreet. Archived (PDF) from the original on April 7, 2026.
- Koenig, Karl (2016a). "Collection II Garland" (PDF). Basinstreet. Archived (PDF) from the original on April 7, 2026.
- Koenig, Karl (2016b). "Music in the Parishes Surrounding New Orleans: St. Tammany" (PDF). Basinstreet. Archived (PDF) from the original on April 7, 2026.
- Koenig, Karl (2016c). "A History of New Orleans Jazz" (PDF). Basinstreet. Archived (PDF) from the original on August 13, 2025.
- Rust, Brian, ed. (January 1, 1961). Jazz Records A-Z 1897-1931. Vol. 2. Middlesex, England: Hatch End.
- Rust, Brian; Shaw, Malcolm, eds. (2002). Jazz Records A-Z 1897-1931. Vol. 1. Denver, Colorado: Mainspring Press.
- Rust, Brian; Shaw, Malcolm, eds. (2002a). Jazz and Ragtime Records (1897-1942): L-Z, index. Vol. 2. Denver, Colorado: Mainspring Press.
- Charters, Samuel (2008). Trumpet Around the Corner The Story of New Orleans Jazz. Jackson, Mississippi: University Press of Mississippi. "Stratakos began his recording career as trombonist with Johnny DeDroit and The New Orleans Jazz Orchestra in 1925, and he continued to be an important local jazz artist, with a group that included several important younger musicians, among them cornetist Johnny Wiggs, trumpeter Louis Prima, clarinetist Irving Fazola, saxophonist Joe Loyocano, pianist Freddie Neuman, and drummer Augie Schellang."
- Boulard, Garry (2002). Louis Prima. Chicago, Illinois: University of Illinois Press. ISBN 9780252070907.
- Souchon, Edmond (1984). The Second Line. Vol. 36. New Orleans, LA: New Orleans Jazz Club.
- Staff Writers (June 9, 2015). "Greek-American Jazz Musicians". National Herald. Archived from the original on April 7, 2026.
- Rose, Al (1974). Storyville, New Orleans, being an Authentic, Illustrated Account of the Notorious Red-light District. Tuscaloosa, Alabama: University of Alabama Press.
