= Hondurans in New Orleans =

Ethnic group in New Orleans, Louisiana, U.S.

As of 2014, the New Orleans metropolitan area has the largest Honduran American community in the United States. As of that year, over 103,049 persons of Honduran origin reside in the New Orleans area.

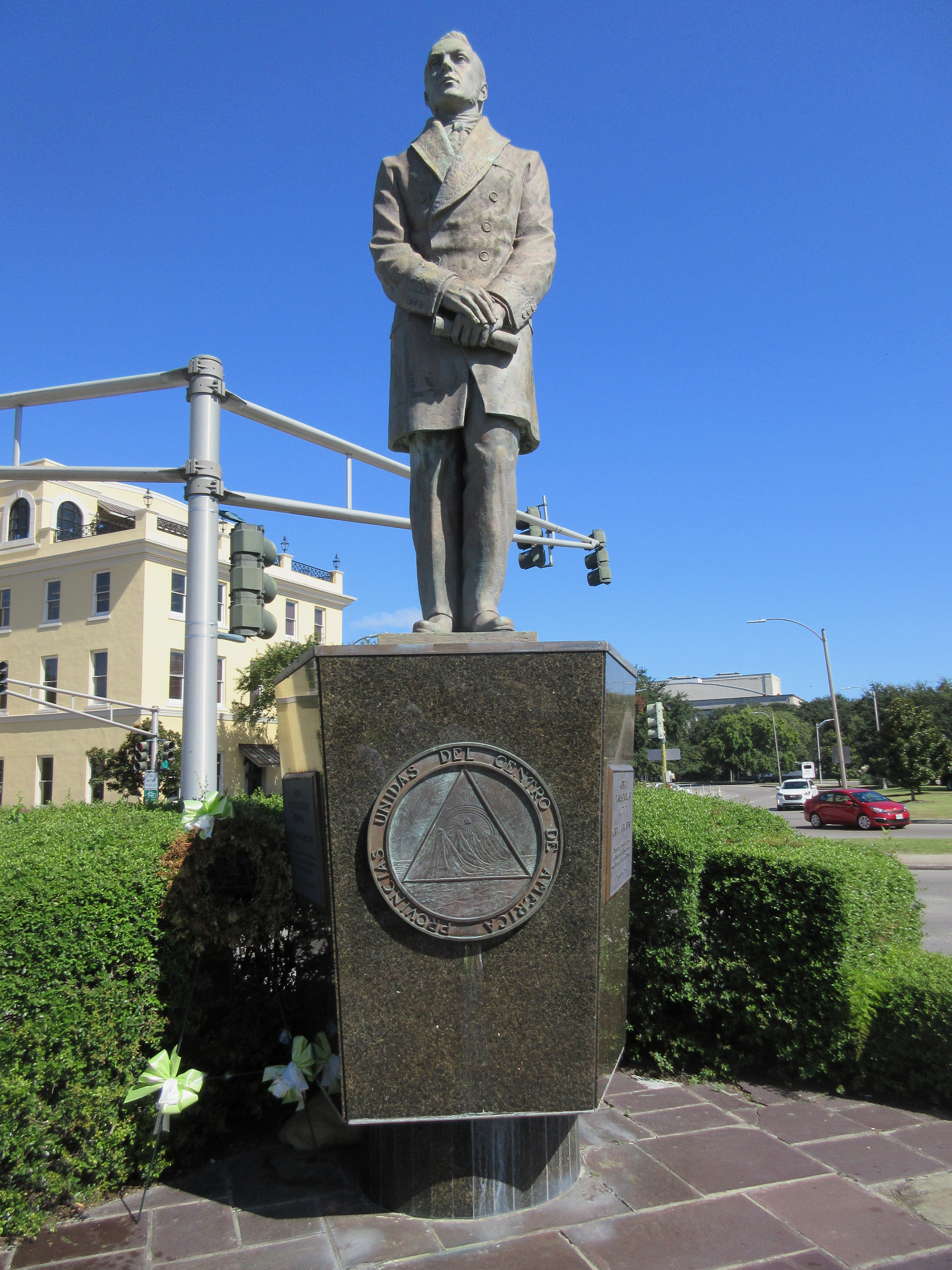
Statue of Honduran hero Francisco Morazán has been a landmark on Basin Street since 1966.

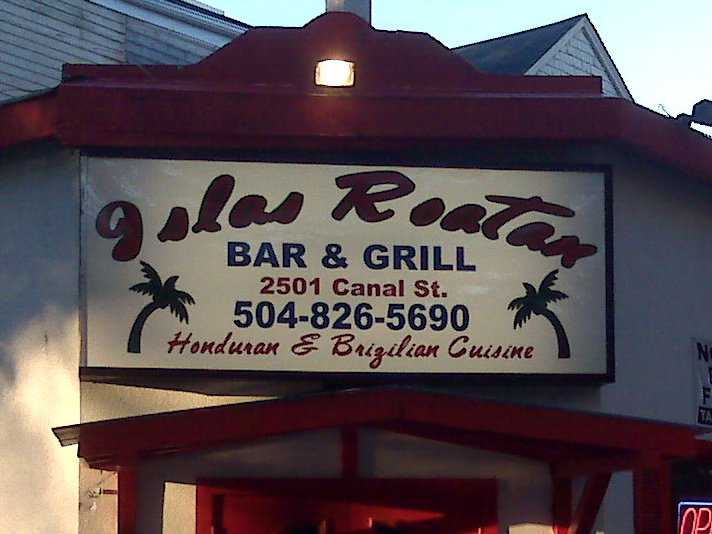
Sign on Honduran restaurant in Mid-City New Orleans.

== History ==
The Honduran community originates from the operations of banana and fruit companies such as Standard Fruit Co. and United Fruit Co., which produced bananas in Honduras and had their corporate headquarters in New Orleans. These operations began in the late 1800s. In time many wealthier Hondurans who desired education and healthcare would move to New Orleans. Prior to Hurricane Katrina, there were over 100,000 Hondurans, making up 10% of the total population, in the New Orleans area. Around the 1950s a settlement of Hondurans was in New Orleans. In the 1960s the first large wave of Hondurans, many of whom moved to the centrally located Garden District, came to New Orleans to escape late 1950s floods, fruit company strikes, and military coups which resulted in the instability of Honduras's economy and political system. The population shifted to the suburbs as it matured. By 2000 Hondurans made up 24% of the 64,340 people of Hispanic origin in the four parishes of the U.S. government-defined New Orleans area.

Within a year of Hurricane Katrina in 2005, over 10,000 Hondurans and Mexicans moved to New Orleans to do work rebuilding the city. At the time the George W. Bush administration suspended some labor laws on a temporary basis, and several federal contractors aired Spanish-language television advertisements promising work to the illegal immigrants without the possibility of deportation. By 2014 several of the immigrants were criticizing officials who were trying to deport them.

By 2014 many Honduran children fleeing crime and violence in their native country were resettled in New Orleans.

== Institutions ==
The government of Honduras maintains a consulate general in New Orleans. It is planning to establish a Honduran association to protect the interests of Hondurans residing in the city.

== Commerce ==
As of 2014 and since Katrina many Hondurans in New Orleans operate mobile food trucks and restaurants.

== Education ==
In the 2014-2015 school year Jefferson Parish Public Schools had 48,126 students, 1,467 students (3%) higher than the enrollment of the previous school year. There were a total of 5,634 English Language Learners (ELL) students as part of the overall student enrollment for 2014-2015, and that had increased by about 1,200 (28%). Most of the additional students for 2014-2015 were Hispanic, and of them, most were Honduran. According to ELL director Karina Castillo the East Bank had more of the new students than the West Bank.
