= Robert E. Lee Building =

Office building in Jackson, Mississippi

Coordinates: 32°18′8.7″N 90°11′7.9″W

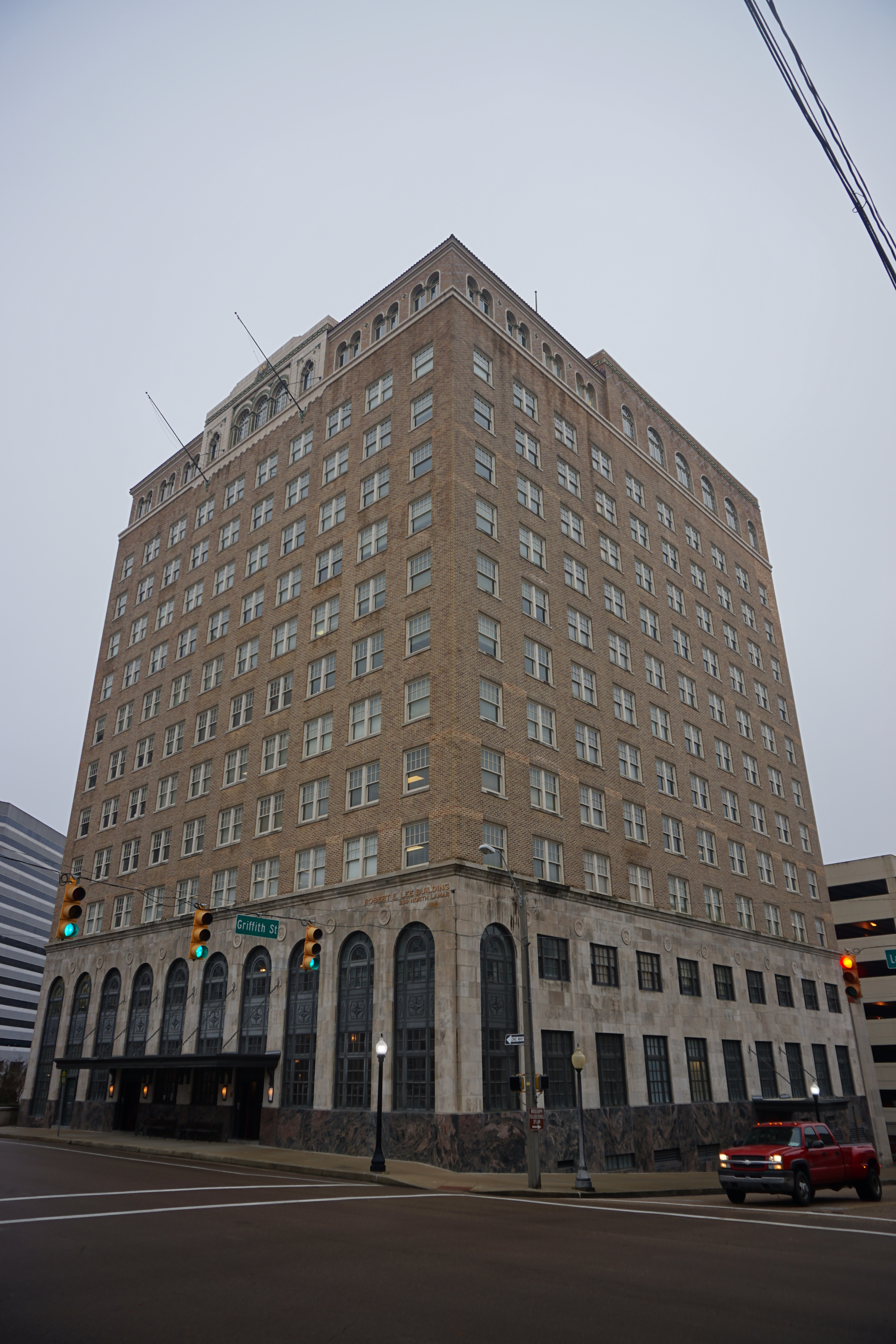
December 2018

The Robert E. Lee Building is an office building at 239 North Lamar Street in Jackson, Mississippi. It was primarily built as the Robert E. Lee Hotel and operated as such from 1930 to July 6, 1964, when it closed rather than admit African Americans as required by the Civil Rights Act of 1964. As of 2017, state government personnel working in the building included: Mississippi Department of Mental Health, the Board of Licensed Professional Counselors, the Board of Registration for Foresters, the Charter School Authorizer Board, Office of Capitol Post Conviction Counsel, Offices of Information Technology Services, Office of State Public Defender, and the Board of Cosmetology.
