= Mirna Valerio =

American runner

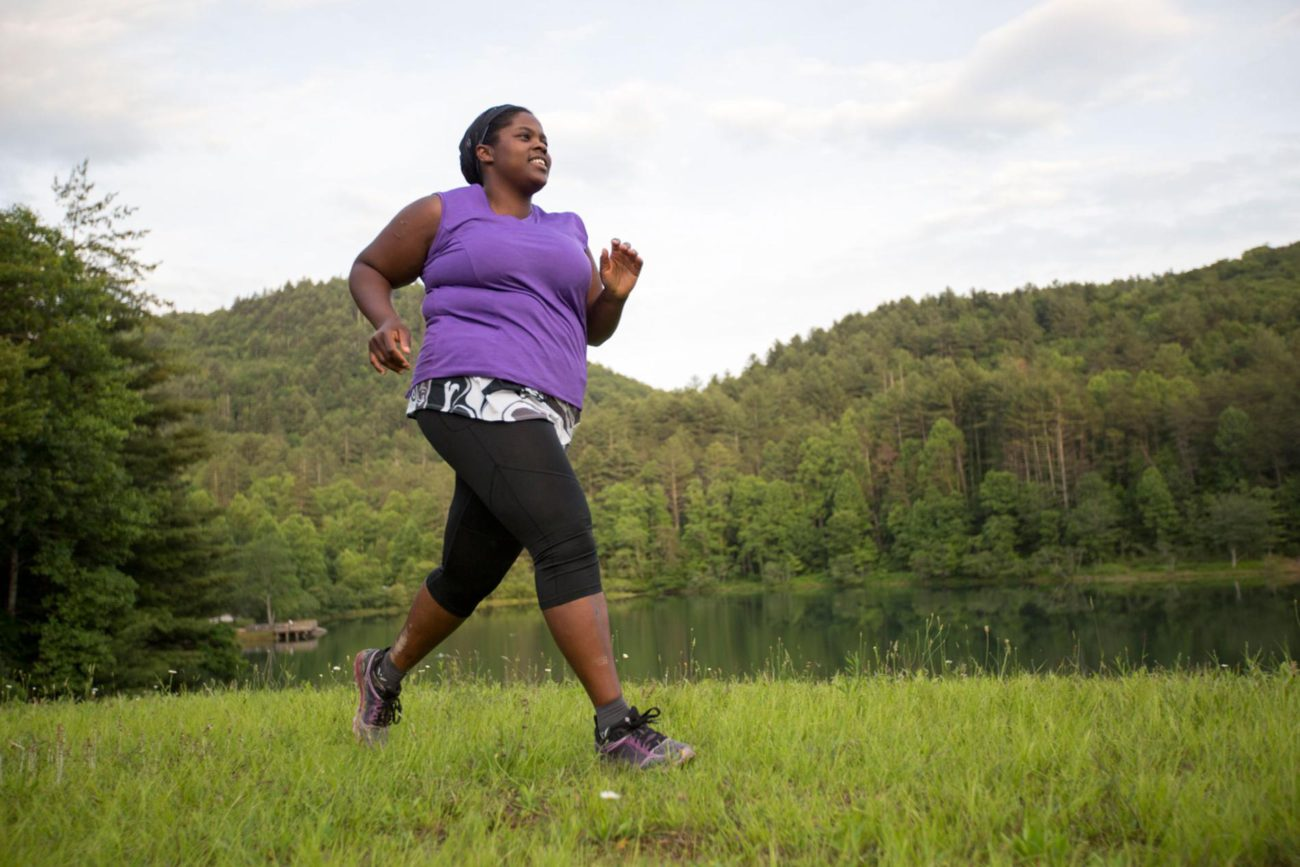
Mirna Valerio runs around Blackrock Lake in Georgia. In effort to bring body-positive messaging to the world of ultramarathon running, she's faced racism, sexism, and body shaming.

Mirna Valerio (born 1975, sometimes incorrectly cited as 1978 or 1979) is an American runner who advocates for inclusion in the running community towards people of all races, sizes, genders, and backgrounds. In her own words, “[she is] good with [her] big body.”

== Early life and education ==
Valerio was raised in Bushwick, Brooklyn in New York City. Her father was a Honduran merchant seaman, and her stepfather worked at the laundry facilities of a hospital. At eight years old she discovered her love for the outdoors and hiking while attending summer camp in the Catskill Mountains. Her mother ensured they had a sit-down family meal every night and strictly kept Valerio to a homework schedule. She had three siblings; her mother and some of her siblings had weight-related health problems including diabetes and hypertension. In high school (The Masters School) she signed up to play field hockey. She recalls that the first practice, which involved running laps, left her so sore that it was painful to move the following day. After lacrosse, she picked up running and, as an introvert, came to appreciate the solitary nature of the sport. She also discovered her talent for singing, and attended The Juilliard School during the weekends after a successful audition.

Because of her love of music, Valerio attended Oberlin Conservatory of Music in Ohio for college. While there, she studied the Spanish language as well as vocal performance. Valerio worked as a high school Spanish teacher for 18 years before her running career took off.

== Running career ==
After she experienced a health crisis in her early thirties and was notified of artery inflammation, Valerio began exercising more regularly. Soon, she was running a 5K race every week. She found she enjoyed running longer distances, and has since run marathons and ultramarathons; additionally, she participates in trail running. As of August 2020, she has completed 11 marathons and 14 ultramarathons. Valerio prefers trail running because it forces her to be more present in her mind and body while also connecting with nature. She began documenting her running experiences as a large-bodied woman on her blog, Fat Girl Running, which she started in 2012 when training for her first marathon. Her first article was titled "This Is Not a Weight Loss Blog". While reception to her blog was generally positive, many online have trolled her for her size and questioned the validity of her athletic achievements. She said, "I think there’s some inherent racism and sexism going on, especially with body image and body shape. They don’t like to see me on a cover of a magazine because I do not represent what fitness means to them." A typical running pace for her is a thirteen-minute mile (eight-minute kilometer). As of 2018, when not training for an event, she ran an average of 25 mi (40 km) each week.

== Awards and honors ==
In 2018, she was named a National Geographic "Adventurer of the Year". She appeared on the cover of Women's Running magazine for their September 2017 issue.

Nichols and Sarah Menzies created a brief video about Valerio with funding from REI called The Mirnavator.

== Other accomplishments ==
In 2017, she published her personal memoir A Beautiful Work in Progress. Regarding her book, Valerio said she "wanted to frame [her] own narrative.” "Her writing has been featured in Women’s Running Magazine, Self Magazine Online, Outside Online, and Runner's World Magazine. As a diversity professional for over 11 years, Valerio also works as a motivational speaker and presenter on how diversity, equity, and inclusion pertain to education, the outdoor industry, and fitness.

== Personal life ==
She married Cito Nikiema, originally from Burkina Faso, after they met in New York City. She now resides in Montpelier, Vermont with their son while her husband splits his time between there, New York City, and Burkina Faso.
