= Mills (surname) =

Mills is an English and Scottish occupational surname. Notable people with the surname include:

== A ==
- A. J. Mills (politician) (1841–1925), American politician
- A. J. Mills (songwriter) (1872–1919), English lyricist
- Aaron Mills (born 1972), American professional arena football player
- Abraham Mills (geologist) (1750–1828), British geologist
- Abraham G. Mills (1844–1929), American baseball executive
- Adrian Mills (born 1956), British television presenter
- Aileen Mills (born 1963), English athlete
- Alan Mills (disambiguation), multiple people
- Albert Leopold Mills (1854–1916), United States Army Major General, Medal of Honor awardee
- Alec Mills (born 1991), American professional baseball player
- Alec Mills (cinematographer) (1932–2024), British cinematographer
- Alec Mills (soccer) (born 2000), Australian professional soccer player
- Alena Mills (born 1990), Czech ice hockey player
- Alexander Rud Mills (1885–1964), Australian barrister, author and Neopagan
- Alexandria Mills (born 1992), American model and Miss World 2010
- Alfred Mills (1899–?), British flying ace of World War I
- Alfred Mills (footballer) (1874–1929), British association football player
- Ali Mills (singer) (living), Australian Indigenous singer
- Alice Mills (photographer) (1870–1929), Australian photographer
- Alice du Pont Mills (1912–2002), American aviator and race-horse breeder
- Alley Mills (born 1951), American actress
- Amy-Lea Mills (born 1986), Australian athlete
- Andrew Mills (Australian footballer) (born 1981), Australian rules footballer
- Andrew Mills (English footballer) (born 1993), English association football player
- Ann Mills (18th century), British woman disguised as a sailor
- Anne Mills (born 1951), British authority on health economics
- Annette Mills (1894–1955), British dancer, actress and broadcaster
- Annette Mills (academic) (living), professor of accounting and information systems at University of Canterbury in New Zealand
- Anson Mills (1834–1924), United States general
- Anthony Mills (1920–1997), English cricketer
- Antonia Mills (living), Canadian anthropologist
- Art Mills (1903–1975), American baseball player
- Arthur Mills (disambiguation), multiple people
- Ashley Love-Mills (born 1988), American fashion model and actress
- Autumn Mills (born 1988), Canadian ice hockey player

== B ==
- Bailey J Mills (born 1999), English drag performer
- Barbara Mills (1940–2011), British barrister, DBC and QC
- Barrington Mills (1821–1899), English cricketer and clergyman
- Barry Mills (disambiguation), multiple people
- Beau Mills (born 1986), American professional baseball player
- Ben Mills (born 1980), British singer
- Ben Mills (footballer) (born 1989), British footballer
- Benjamin Mills (1779–1831), American politician
- Benjamin Fay Mills (1857–1916), American evangelist and independent religious leader
- Bernard Mills (1920–2011), Australian engineer and radio astronomy pioneer
- Bert Mills (1910–1984), Australian rules footballer and coach
- Bertram Mills (1873–1938), British circus owner
- Beryl Mills (1907–1977), first Miss Australia
- Bill Mills (baseball) (1919–2019), American professional baseball player
- Billy Mills (disambiguation), multiple people
- Blake Mills (born 1986), American musician
- Bob Mills (comedian) (born 1957), English comedian
- Bob Mills (politician) (born 1941), Canadian politician
- Bobby Mills (disambiguation), multiple people
- Brad Mills (manager) (born 1957), American baseball player and coach
- Brad Mills (pitcher) (born 1985), American baseball player
- Bradley Mills (born 1983), Canadian ice hockey player
- Bree Mills (born 1981), American director, screenwriter and producer of pornographic films
- Brian Mills (footballer) (born 1971), English footballer
- Brian Mills (television director) (1933–2006), British television director
- Bruce Mills (1901–1936), Australian rules footballer
- Brusher Mills (1840–1905), English snake-catcher
- Buster Mills (1908–1991), American baseball player and coach

== C ==
- C. Wright Mills (1916–1962), American academic sociologist
- Caleb Mills (1806–1879), American education administrator
- Caleb Mills (basketball) (born 2000), American college basketball player
- Callum Mills (born 1997), professional Australian rules footballer
- Charisse Mills (born 1988), Trinidadian-American musical artist
- Charles Mills (disambiguation), multiple people
- Charlie Mills (baseball) (1844–1874), American baseball player
- Charlie Mills (harness racer) (1888–1972), German horse racer and trainer
- Che Mills (born 1982), British mixed martial arts fighter
- Cheryl Mills (born 1965), American lawyer
- Chris Mills (basketball) (born 1970), American basketball player
- Chris Mills (musician) (living), American musician
- Christopher Mills (director) (born 1901), Canadian animator and cinematographer
- Chuck Mills (1928–2021), American college football coach
- Clark Mills (boatbuilder) (1915–2001), American boat designer and builder
- Clark Mills (sculptor) (1810–1883), American sculptor
- Claudia Mills (born 1954), American author and academic
- Clay Mills (living), American songwriter
- Colin Mills (educationalist) (born 1951), British educationalist and writer
- Colin Mills (sociologist) (born 1951), British academic sociologist
- Colleen Mills (1955–2022), New Zealand management academic
- Cory Mills (born 1980), American businessman and politician
- Cowin Mills (born 1986), Trinidadian Olympic sprinter
- Craig Mills (born 1976), Canadian professional ice hockey player
- Crispian Mills (born 1973), English rock musician and film director

== D ==
- Daman Mills (living), American voice actor
- Damian Mills (1979–2003), Canadian cricketer
- Dan Mills (c.1931–2011), American animator and layout artist
- Daniel Mills (disambiguation), multiple people
- Danny Mills (disambiguation), multiple people
- Darby Mills (born 1959), Canadian singer
- Darius Ogden Mills (1825–1910), American banker and philanthropist
- Dave Mills (singer) (1935–2014), English-Australian singer
- David Mills (disambiguation), multiple people
- Davis Mills (born 1998), American football player
- Dedrick Mills (born 1996), American football player
- Demi Mills (born 2004), American actress
- Dennis Mills (born 1946), Canadian businessman and politician
- Denver Mills (1925–1997), American professional football player
- Derek Mills (born 1972), American Olympic runner
- Devin Mills (living), American actress
- DiAnn Mills (living), American writer of Christian fiction
- Dick Mills (baseball) (1945–2015), American baseball player
- Don Mills (basketball) (1937–2023), American college basketball player
- Don Mills (footballer) (1928–1994), English footballer
- Don Harper Mills (1927–2013), American pathologist and medical-legal scholar
- Donald Mills (footballer) (1909–1945), Australian rules footballer
- Donna Mills (born 1940), American actress
- Donna Mills (baseball) (born 1973), American baseball player
- Doug Mills (photographer) (born 1960), American photographer
- Douglas R. Mills (1907–1993), American basketball player and coach, college athletics administrator

== E ==
- E. C. Mills (1873–1962), American educator
- E. J. Mills (American football) (living), American football player
- Ed Mills (1922–2002), American professional basketball player
- Eddie Mills (born 1972), American actor
- Edgar G. Mills (1860-aft 1921), American politician
- Edmund James Mills (1840–1921), British chemist
- Edward Mills (1863–1956), cricketer for Auckland
- Edwin Mills (disambiguation), multiple people
- Elden Mills (1908–1965), American politician
- Eleanor Mills (journalist) (born 1970), British journalist
- Eleri Mills (born 1955), Welsh artist
- Elijah H. Mills (1776–1829), American politician
- Elizabeth Shown Mills (born 1944), American novelist
- Ella Woodward (born 1991), British blogger, entrepreneur
- Elle Mills (born 1998), Canadian YouTuber
- Emma Mills (born 1989), American author and YouTuber
- Enoch J. Mills (1878–1935), American college sports coach
- Enos Mills (1870–1922), American natural history writer
- Erie Mills (1953–2026), American operatic soprano and voice teacher
- Ernestina Naadu Mills (living), Ghanaian former first lady
- Ernestine Mills (1871–1959), British enameller
- Ernie Mills (disambiguation), multiple people
- Esther Burnell Mills (1889–1964), American pioneer and homesteader
- Eugene S. Mills (1924–2020), American academic
- Everett Mills (1845–1908), American baseball player

== F–G ==
- F. J. Mills (1865–1953), American politician
- Fanny Mills (1860–1892), British-American circus performer
- Felix Mills (1901–1987), American composer‐arranger‐conductor
- Fergus Mills (1840–1924), American politician
- Florence Mills (1896–1927), African American cabaret singer, dancer, and comedian
- Frances Jones Mills (1920–1996), Kentucky politician
- Francesca Mills (born 1998), English dancer and stage actress
- Frank Mills (disambiguation), multiple people
- Fred Mills (disambiguation), multiple people
- Freddie Mills (1919–1965), British boxer
- Frederick Mills (disambiguation), multiple people
- Garrett Mills (born 1983), American football player
- Garry Mills (born 1941), British pop singer
- Gary Mills (disambiguation), multiple people
- Gavin Mills (born 2000), South African rugby union player
- Gemar Mills (born 1982), American author and speaker
- George Mills (disambiguation), multiple people
- Gladstone Mills (1920–2004), Jamaican academic and cricketer\
- Glen Mills (born 1949), Jamaican track and field coach
- Gloria Mills (born 1950), British trade union official
- Gord Mills (1928–2004), Canadian politician
- Gordon B. Mills (living), oncology researcher
- Gordon Mills (1935–1986), British songwriter and music manager
- Graham Mills (1917–1992), British Army general
- Greg Mills (born 1962), South African writer
- Greg Mills (footballer) (born 1990), English association football player
- Grey Mills (living), American politician
- Gyp Mills (1946–2019), British sculptor and songwriter

== H–I ==
- Hank Mills (1936–2005), American composer
- Hannah Mills (born 1988), British sailor
- Hannah Mills (Quaker) (died 1790), British Quaker
- Harlan Mills (1919–1996), American computer scientist
- Harriet Cornelia Mills (1920–2016), American Sinologist
- Harriet May Mills (1857–1936), American civil rights leader
- Harry Mills (footballer) (1922–1990), English footballer
- Harry Mills (politician) (1874–1959), Canadian politician
- Hayley Mills (born 1946), British actress
- Heather Mills (born 1968), British model, businesswoman and activist, second wife of Paul McCartney
- Henry Mills (cricketer) (1847–1915), British cricketer
- Hiram Mills (1796–1882), American philanthropist
- Holly Mills (born 2000), British athlete
- Horace Mills (1864–1941), British actor, singer and dramatist
- Howard Mills III (born 1964), American politician
- Hugh Brooks Mills, American businessman and politician
- Hugh Mills (politician) (1828–1901), American politician
- Hugh Mills (rugby union) (1873–1905), New Zealand rugby union player
- Hugh Mills (writer) (1913–1971), British playwright and screenwriter
- Iain Mills (1940–1997), British politician
- Ian Mills (born 1969), British businessman
- Ian Mills (water polo) (born 1945), Australian water polo player
- Irving Mills (1894–1985), American jazz music publisher and lyricist
- Isaac Mills (cricketer) (1869–1956), New Zealand cricketer
- Isaac N. Mills (1851–1929), American politician

== J ==
- J. M. A. Mills (1894–1986), English theosophist writer and clerk
- JLouis Mills (living), American actor
- Jack Mills (disambiguation), multiple people
- Jackie Mills (1922–2010), American jazz musician
- Jacob Mills (born 2007), English swimmer
- Jacquelyn Mills (living), Canadian documentary filmmaker
- Jade Mills (living), American real estate agent
- Jae Millz (born 1983), American rapper from Harlem, New York
- Jalen Mills (born 1994), American football cornerback
- James Mills (disambiguation), multiple people
- Jane Mills (living), Australian-New Zealand academic
- Janet Mills (born 1947), American politician and 75th governor of Maine
- Janet M. Mills (c.1921–1991), American Republican politician from Connecticut
- Jared Mills (born 1976), New Zealand rugby league footballer
- Jason Mills (born 1969), New Zealand cricketer
- Javor Mills (born 1979), American football defensive end
- Jay Mills (born 1961), US American football coach
- Jean Mills (born 1955), Canadian young adult and children's novelist
- Jean-Baptiste Mills (1749–1806), Haitian politician
- Jeannie Mills (1939–1980), American cult defector
- Jeff Mills (born 1963), American DJ and music producer
- Jeff Mills (linebacker) (born 1968), American football player
- Jennifer Mills (born 1977), Australian writer
- Jerry Mills (1951–1993), American cartoonist
- Jess Mills (born 1981), British singer
- Jess Mills (cricketer) (born 1989), Scottish cricketer
- Jessica Mills (born 1974), American figure skater
- Jill Mills (born 1972), American strongwoman
- Jim Mills (disambiguation), multiple people
- Jimmy Mills (1894–1990), Scottish footballer
- Joanne Mills (born 1969), Australian professional golfer
- Jock Mills (born 1900), Scottish footballer
- Joe Mills (rugby union), 19th-century English rugby union footballer
- John Mills (disambiguation), multiple people
- John Archibald Mills (1910–1986), Canadian politician
- John Remington Mills (1798–1879), English politician
- John S. Mills (1906–1996), United States general
- John T. Mills (1817–1871), American lawyer who served as a Supreme Court Justice for the Republic of Texas
- Jon Mills (born 1978), Canadian professional golfer
- Jon Mills (psychologist) (living), Canadian philosopher, psychoanalyst, and clinical psychologist
- Jon L. Mills (born 1947), American lawyer and politician
- Jonathan Mills (born 1984), Welsh rugby union player
- Jonathan Mills (composer) (born 1963), Australian composer
- Jordan Mills (born 1990), American football player
- Joseph Mills (footballer) (born 1989), English footballer
- Joseph Trotter Mills (1811–1897), American politician and jurist
- Joshua Mills (disambiguation), multiple people
- Josiah Mills (1862–1929), English cricketer
- Judson Mills (born 1969), American actor
- Juliet Mills (born 1941), British character actress
- Juliette Mills (born 1945), French actress and artist
- June Tarpé Mills (1912–1988), American comics creator

== K–L ==
- Karen Mills (born 1953), American businesswoman, Administrator of the Small Business Administration
- Karen R. Mills (living), American politician
- Katherine Mills (born 1983), English magician and mentalist
- Kathleen Mills (1923–1996), Dublin Camogie player 1941–1961
- Kathy Mills, (c.1935–2022), Australian community leader, singer, Aboriginal elder and activist
- Kay Mills (writer) (1941–2011), American journalist
- Kayla Mills (born 1995), American association football player
- Kayli Mills (born 1994), American actress and voice actress
- Keith Mills (born 1950), British businessman
- Keith Mills (footballer) (born 1942), English professional footballer (born 1942)
- Keith Mills (Royal Marines officer) (born 1959), Royal Marines officer
- Ken Mills (1935–2018), British chemistry professor
- Kenneth G. Mills (1923–2004), Canadian artist
- Kerry Mills (1869–1948), American composer
- Koshie Mills (living), Ghanaian television producer
- Kyle Mills (born 1979), New Zealand cricketer
- Kyle Mills (author) (born 1966), American author
- Kylen Mills, sports reporter for KRON 4
- Lamar Mills (born 1971), American football player
- Lawrence Heyworth Mills (1837–1918), American orientalist
- Lee Mills (born 1970), British professional association footballer
- Lefty Mills (1912–1982), American baseball player
- Leif Mills (1936–2020), British trade unionist
- Leigh Mills (born 1988), English footballer (born 1988)
- Leila Mills (born 1959), American judge
- Len Mills (1898–1965), Australian rules footballer
- Les Mills (born 1934), New Zealand Olympic athlete
- Leslie Mills (born 1950), American singer, songwriter, record producer, and actress
- Leslie Mills (cricketer) (1914–2000), Australian cricketer
- Lewis Mills (disambiguation), multiple people
- Lia Mills (living), Irish writer
- Lillian Mills (living), American accountant and academic administrator
- Lilly Mills (born 2001), Australian cricketer
- Linda G. Mills (living), academic and president of New York University
- Lindsay Mills (born 1985), American acrobat and blogger
- Liz Mills, Australian basketball coach
- Lorna Mills (living), Canadian multimedia artist
- Lotus Mills (died 1975), American politician
- Lyman A. Mills (1841–1929), American politician

== M ==
- Magnus Mills (born 1954), English author
- Margaret Mills (actress) (died 1717), British stage actress of the late seventeenth and early eighteenth century
- Margaret Mills (bowls) (living), Zimbabwean international lawn bowler
- Margaret Mills (folklorist) (born 1946), American folklorist
- Marilyn Mills (1903–1956), American actor
- Mark Mills (architect) (1921–2007), American architect
- Mark Mills (writer) (born 1963), British writer
- Mark Muir Mills (1917–1958), American nuclear physicist
- Marshall Mills (born 1953), American football coach
- Martin Mills (born 1949), British entrepreneur, founder and chairman of the Beggars Group, London
- Mary Mills (golfer) (born 1940), American golfer
- Mary Mills (soprano) (born 1964), American opera singer
- Mary Hayley Bell (1911–2005), English actress, writer and dramatist
- Matt Mills (born 1986), English association football player
- Matt Mills (racing driver) (born 1996), American stock car racing driver
- Matthew Mills, English footballer
- May Mills (1890–1984), Australian sports administrator and educator
- Melinda Mills (born 1969), Canadian and Dutch sociologist
- Melvin Whitson Mills (1845–1925), American politician
- Merrill I. Mills (1819–1882), American mayor
- Michael Mills (disambiguation), multiple people
- Michael P. Mills (born 1956), United States federal judge
- Mick Mills (born 1949), British footballer
- Mike Mills (born 1958), American musician and composer, bass guitar player for R.E.M.
- Mike Mills (director) (born 1966), American director
- Miles E. Mills (1891–1972), American politician
- Miriam Mills (1938–1992), American professor of public policy
- Morris Mills (1927–2024), politician from Indiana, U.S.
- Mort Mills (1919–1993), American actor
- Mosky Mills (1889–1972), English footballer
- Mrs. Mills (1918–1978), English pianist
- Murray Mills (bishop) (born 1936), Bishop of Waiapu

== N–P ==
- Nat Mills (1900–1993), English entertainer as one half of Nat Mills and Bobbie
- Natalia Mills (born 1993), Panamanian association football player
- Nathaniel Mills (born 1970), American speed skater
- Newt V. Mills (1899–1996), American politician
- Nicholas Mills (1781–1862), American businessman
- Nicholas Mills (academic) (living), British academic
- Nigel Mills (born 1974), British politician
- Nigel Mills (RAF officer) (1932–1991), RAF air marshal
- Noah Mills (born 1983), Canadian model and actor
- Noam Mills (born 1986), Israeli Olympic fencer
- Noel Mills (1944–2004), New Zealand rower
- Noel Mills (actress) (born 1917 or 1918), American actress
- Norman Mills, English actor, known for "Emmerdale"
- Ogden Mills (financier) (1857–1929), American businessman, father of Ogden L.
- Ogden L. Mills (1884–1937), American Secretary of the Treasury and Congressman
- Olan Mills Sr. (1904–1978), American photographer and entrepreneur, co-founder of photo-studio chain Olan Mills
- Ossian Everett Mills, American fraternity founder
- Pablo Mills (born 1984), English footballer
- Paddy Mills (1900–1994), British footballer
- Paddy Mills (Australian footballer) (1884–1957), Australian rules footballer
- Paddy Mills (speedway rider) (1913–1975), British speedway rider
- Pat Mills (born 1949), British cartoonist
- Pat Mills (director) (born c. 1980), Canadian film director and actor
- Patty Mills (born 1988), Australian men's basketball player
- Paul Mills (born 1972), American basketball coach
- Paul Mills (figure skater) (born 1950), Canadian figure skater
- Paul Mills (rugby league) (living), Australian rugby league footballer
- Paxton Mills (1948–2001), American radio personality
- Percy Mills (disambiguation), multiple people
- Pete Mills (born 1942), American football player
- Peter Mills (disambiguation), multiple people
- Phil Mills (born 1963), Welsh rally co-driver
- Phillip Mills (born 1955), New Zealand hurdler and founder of Les Mills International
- Phoebe Mills (born 1972), American gymnast and athlete

== R ==
- Rachel Ann Mills (living), British marine geochemist
- Ralph J. Mills Jr. (1931–2007), American poet and critic
- Randall V. Mills (1907–1952), American professor of literature
- Randell Mills (born 1958), American chemist and developer of the hydrino theory
- Reginald Mills (1912–1990), British film editor
- Reginald Mills (RAF officer) (1885–1968), Air Vice Marshal
- Richard Mills (disambiguation), multiple people
- Richard Henry Mills (1929–2023), United States federal judge
- Richard M. Mills Jr. (born 1959), Ambassador of the United States
- Rob Mills (born 1982), Australian pop singer
- Robby Mills (born 1967), American politician
- Robert Mills (disambiguation), multiple people
- Rodney Mills (born 1946), American audio engineer
- Rodolfo Mills (born 1958), Costa Rican footballer
- Rogelio Mills (born 2000), American television personality
- Roger Mills (disambiguation), multiple people
- Roly Mills (1933–2010), English footballer
- Ron Mills (1938–2015), Australian rules footballer
- Ron Mills (curler) (1943–2008), Canadian curler
- Ronnie Mills (born 1951), American swimmer, Olympic bronze medalist
- Rosaleen Mills (1905–1993), Irish activist and educator
- Royce Mills (1942–2019), English actor
- Rudy Mills (living), Reggae musician
- Rupert Mills (1892–1929), American baseball player
- Russell Mills (architect) (1892–1959), American architect
- Russell Mills (artist) (born 1952), British artist, designed Pingu cartoons for CBBC
- Russell Mills (publisher) (born 1944), Canadian journalist and publisher
- Rusty Mills (1962–2012), American animator
- Ryan Mills (born 1992), English rugby union footballer
- Rylie Mills (born 2001), American football player

== S ==
- Sam Mills (1959–2005), US American football player
- Sam Mills III (born 1978), American football coach
- Samantha Mills (born 1992), Australian diver
- Samuel Mills (disambiguation), multiple people
- Sara Mills (linguist) (born 1954), emeritus Professor in Linguistics at Sheffield Hallam University, England
- Scott Mills (born 1973), British DJ
- Scott Mills (businessman) (born c. 1969), American businessperson
- Selina Mills (1767–1831), English educator and evangelist
- Sharon Mills (born 1970), British judoka
- Shawn Mills (living), American businessman
- Sheila Mills (born 1949), Australian politician
- Sheldon Mills (born c. 1975), Welsh regulatory executive
- Sheldon T. Mills (1904–1988), American diplomat
- Sherron Mills (1971–2016), American basketball player
- Shirley Mills (1926–2010), American actress and dancer
- Sidney Mills (born 1959), Jamaican musician
- Simeon Mills (1810–1895), American politician
- Simon Mills (footballer) (born 1964), British footballer
- Sir Frederick Mills, 1st Baronet (1865–1953), British politician and Steel Commission member
- Skidd Mills (living), American composer
- Skip Mills (born 1985), American basketball player
- Sonia Mills (born 1980), Australian rower
- Stan Mills (1893–1933), American football player
- Stephanie Anne Mills (born 1979), Canadian actress
- Stephanie Mills (born 1957), African-American singer
- Stephen Mills (born 1960), American ballet dancer and choreographer
- Stephen Mills (public servant) (1857–1948), Australian public servant
- Steve Mills (disambiguation), multiple people
- Stewart Mills (born 1991), Australian rugby league footballer
- Stormie Mills (born 1969), Australian street artist
- Stratton Mills (born 1932), British politician
- Stu Mills (born 1982), New Zealand cricketer
- Stuart Mills (born 1990), Scottish professional footballer
- Susan Tolman Mills (1825–1912), American co-founder and first president of Mills College
- Susana Rivera-Mills (living), Salvadoran sociolinguist and academic administrator

== T—Z ==
- T. Wesley Mills (1847–1915), Canadian physiologist
- Tausha Mills (born 1976), American basketball player
- Terry Mills (disambiguation), multiple people
- Therese Mills (1928–2014), Trinidadian journalist
- Thomas Mills (disambiguation), multiple people
- Tiny Mills (1911–1987), Canadian professional wrestler
- Tom Mills (1908–1978), Australian soldier
- Tommy Mills (c. 1883–1944), American athlete, coach, and administrator
- Tommy Mills (footballer) (1911-unknown), Welsh association football player
- Tony Mills (physician) (born 1961), American physician
- Tony Mills (singer) (1962–2019), British rock singer
- Tracy Mills (born 1962), Canadian Olympic volleyball player
- Travis Mills (born 1989), American rapper, singer, and actor from California
- Travis Mills (soldier) (born 1987), U.S. Army soldier, combat quadruple amputee
- Troy Mills (Canadian football) (born 1966), American gridiron football player
- Tyler Mills (living), American poet
- Tymal Mills (born 1992), English cricketer
- Ursula Mills (living), Australian actor
- Verna Mills (living), diplomat from Saint Kitts and Nevis
- Victor Mills (1897–1997), American chemical engineer
- Vurlon Mills (born 1988), Guyanese footballer
- Wallace Mills (1915–1943), Australian rules footballer
- Walter Mills (disambiguation), multiple people
- Wayde Mills (born 1987), Australian rules footballer
- Wayne Mills (British Army soldier) (living), British soldier
- Wayne Mills (singer) (1969–2013), American country musician
- Wilbur Mills (1909–1992), American politician
- William Mills (disambiguation), multiple people
- Willie Mills (1915–1991), Scottish footballer
- Willie Mills (baseball) (1877–1914), American baseball player
- Wilson Mills (1882–1955), Canadian politician
- Wyatt Mills (1995 born), American baseball player
- Zach Mills (born 1995), American actor
- Zack Mills (born 1982), American football coach
- Zak Mills (born 1992), English association football player

== Fictional characters ==
- Ali Mills (character), fictional character from the Karate Kid franchise
- Bryan Mills, the lead character in the Taken film series, portrayed by Liam Neeson
- Christopher Mills, video game character from Killer7
- Detective Mills, played by Brad Pitt, in Seven (1995 film)
- Family Mills in ABC TV show Once Upon A Time:
  - Regina Mills (Once Upon A Time's Evil Queen version)
  - Henry Daniel Mills
- Stephanie Mills (All in the Family), TV character

== See also ==
=== Groups ===
- Justice Mills (disambiguation)
- Mills Sisters, a singing group from the Torres Strait Islands
- Viscount Mills, title in the Peerage of the United Kingdom

=== Individuals ===
- Angela Kincaid, formerly Angela Mills (living), British children's book illustrator
- Alice Tait née Mills (born 1986), Australian swimmer
- Beatrice Forbes, Countess of Granard née Mills, (1883–1972), American-born Countess of Granard
- Dizzee Rascal aka Dylan Kwabena Mills (born 1984), British rapper
- Georgia Mills Jessup (1926–2016), American painter and ceramicist
- Gladys Mills Phipps (1883–1970), American racehorse owner/breeder
- Isabella Vincent aka Mrs. Mills (1734–1802), British singer and former milkmaid
- Leigh Gibbs née Mills (born 1956), New Zealand netball player and coach
- Leonard Myles-Mills (born 1973), Ghanaian sprinter
- Mary Mills Patrick (1850–1940), American writer
- Pauline Mills McGibbon (1910–2001), Canadian politician
- Philip Mills aka Doris Fish (1952–1991), Australian drag queen
- Rocky Mills aka Rocky Anderson (wrestler) (living), American professional wrestler
