= Thomas Mills =

Thomas Mills may refer to:

- Thomas Mills (printer) (c. 1735–1820), English printer
- Thomas Mills (MP) (1794–1862), British politician
- T. Wesley Mills (1847–1915), Canadian physician and physiologist
- Thomas Brooks Mills (1857–1930), American politician and businessman
- Thomas R. Mills (1878-1953), actor and director of silent films
- Tommy Mills (1883–1944), American football player, coach, and college athletics administrator
- Tommy Mills (footballer, born 1906) (1906-1978), English footballer, see List of Bury F.C. players (25–99 appearances)
- Tom Mills (1908–1978), Australian soldier, tin miner and businessman
- Tommy Mills (footballer) (1911–1979), Welsh footballer
- Thomas Mills, a man who was shot and killed by the British Army in July 1972

== See also ==
- Thomas Hutton-Mills Sr. (1865–1931), lawyer and nationalist leader in the Gold Coast
- David McCain, a former justice of the Florida State Supreme Court, who used the name "Thomas Mills" while a fugitive from justice
