= 101 Dalmatians: The Series =

Television series

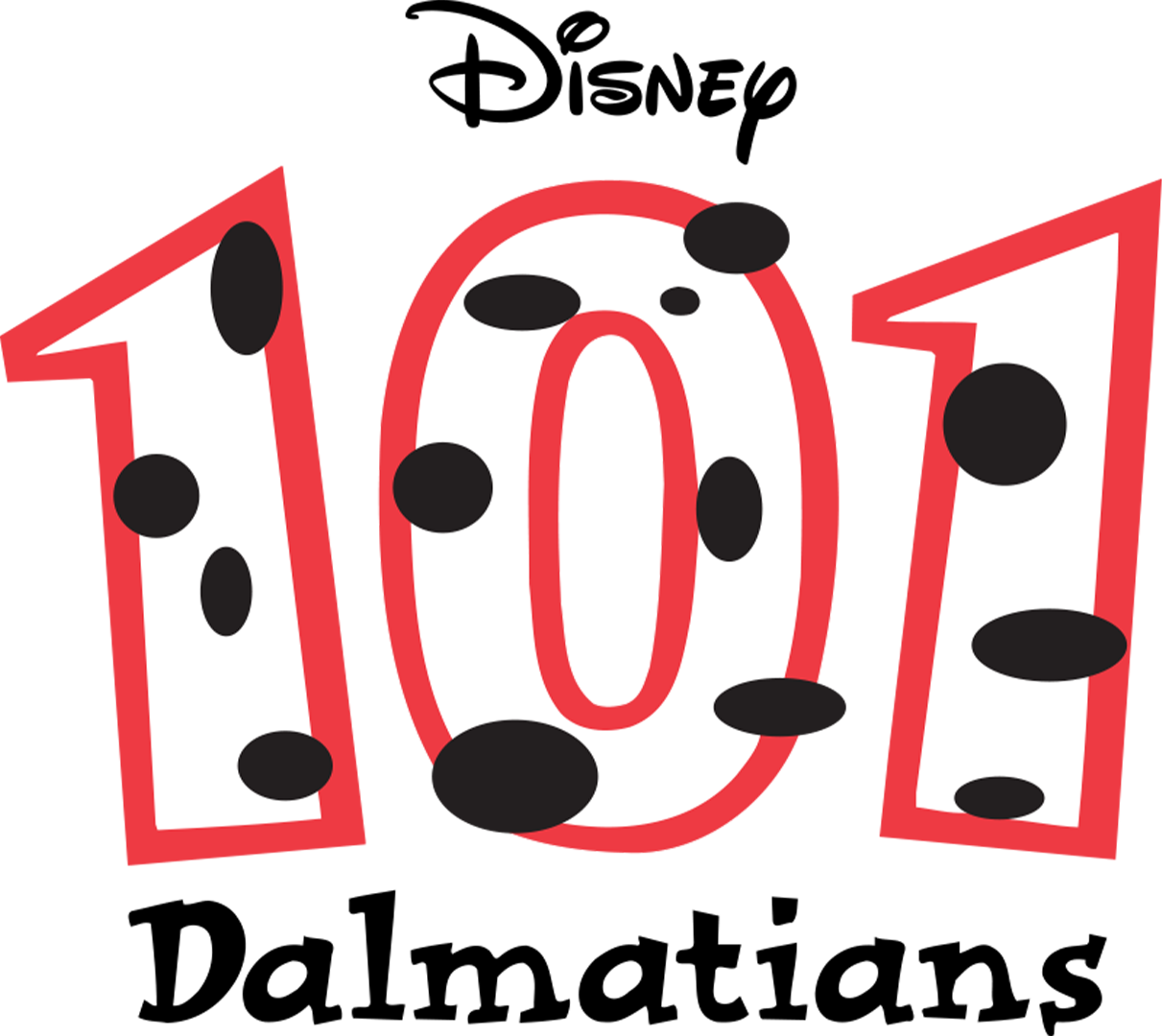
- Also known as: 101 Dalmatians
- Based on: The Hundred and One Dalmatians by Dodie Smith; One Hundred and One Dalmatians by Bill Peet
- Developed by: Jim Jinkins; David Campbell
- Creative director: Jumbo Pictures
- Voices of: Pamela Adlon; Debi Mae West; Kath Soucie; Tara Strong; Jeff Bennett; April Winchell
- Theme music composer: Randy Petersen; Kevin Quinn; Tim Heintz
- Opening theme: "101 Dalmatians"
- Ending theme: "101 Dalmatians" (Instrumental)
- Composers: Mark Watters; Dan Sawyer
- Country of origin: United States
- Original language: English
- No. of seasons: 1 (Note: While this show was produced under a singular production cycle, secondary sources sometimes cite the show under two seasons, as the episodes were originally aired separately on different networks.)
- No. of episodes: 65 (105 segments)

Production
- Executive producers: Jim Jinkins; David Campbell; Tony Craig; Roberts Gannaway
- Producers: Martha Ripp; Victor Cook; Ken Boyer; Rick Schneider-Calabash
- Production location: New York City
- Cinematography: Walt Disney Television
- Editor: Jim Jinkins
- Running time: 22 minutes
- Production companies: Jumbo Pictures; Walt Disney Television Animation

Original release
- Network: ABC (Note: 13 of the 65 episodes were first aired on ABC.)
- Release: September 13, 1997 (Note: The first episode technically aired in syndication on September 1, 1997, although the first chronological episode debuted on ABC.) – January 10, 1998
- Network: Syndication (Note: 52 of the 65 episodes were first aired in syndication.)
- Release: September 1, 1997 – March 4, 1998

Related
- 101 Dalmatian Street

101 Dalmatians: The Series is an American animated television series that aired from September 1, 1997, to March 4, 1998, on the Disney-Kellogg Alliance and ABC. It was produced by Walt Disney Television Animation and Jumbo Pictures and is based on the 1961 Disney animated feature film of the same name and its 1996 live-action remake. It features the voices of Pamela Adlon, Debi Mae West, Kath Soucie and Tara Strong, and is the first television series based on the 101 Dalmatians franchise; it was followed by 101 Dalmatian Street in 2019. It is notable for being the first series to air on ABC's One Saturday Morning programming block.

Many staff members previously worked on the Timon & Pumbaa television show. Doug creator Jim Jinkins and his partner David Campbell both were developers of the series.

== Premise ==
The show focuses primarily on three puppies: Lucky, TV addict leader and unconventional hero; Rolly, his cheerful, laid-back, and always-hungry brother; and Cadpig, their uncanny but loveable sister who is the runt of the family. The three siblings are often joined by Spot, a chicken who wants to be a dog and a member of the Bark Brigade. Early promotional material had listed dictatorial Penny and mischievous Patch as two other puppy cast members, but the highlighted puppies were whittled down to three so Penny was dropped and Patch was no longer a main character. Unlike the original film set in the 1950s London and the 1996 live-action film, the series is set in the United States in the 1990s, on the Dearly Farm.

Other puppies appearing in the show included the fearless, three-legged Tripod, the friendly dimwitted Dipstick, the constantly urinating Wizzer, the fashion-conscious diva Two-Tone, and the Sheepdog mix, Mooch, who serves as the farm's bully. Patch also makes occasional appearances, though with a different personality than originally promoted.

== Characters ==
Promotional poster featuring Lucky, Rolly, Cadpig and Cruella de Vil.

=== Main ===
- Lucky (voiced by Pamela Adlon and Debi Mae West) is the most plucky of the puppies and is unique in having his only spots in the shape of a horseshoe on his back. He is the leader of the main pups and is very adventurous, nice and determined to do whatever he thinks is right. But he is very obsessed with TV and he is usually the one at fault when the main pups get into trouble.
- Cadpig (voiced by Kath Soucie) is the smallest of the puppies and one of the most intelligent, if not deluded somewhat by her abstract state of mind. She is unique in having long floppy ears and a big head. She has a kind-hearted personality, is quite strong for her size and can have a very strong temper.
- Rolly (voiced by Kath Soucie) is always hungry; almost all his decisions are based on food, which sometimes gets him and the pups into trouble. However, he is a cheerful and diligent sibling, especially when it comes to his incredible sense of smell. He's also very timid and is an easy target for bullies due to him being such a foodie.
- Spot (voiced by Tara Strong) (credited as Tara Charendoff) is a chicken who wants to become a dalmatian. She is the most intelligent of the main four and is a voice of reason for the foursome, but is more often than not ignored. She is easily scared and is prone to literally bouncing off the walls. But she is a great dancer and appears to be good at math. She is also able to fly to some extent. In certain episodes, she acts as a private investigator and sports an alter-ego by the name of Pullet Marlowe.
- Roger (voiced by Jeff Bennett) and Anita Dearly (voiced by Kath Soucie) are owners of the 101 Dalmatians and the Dearly Farm.
- Cruella de Vil (voiced by April Winchell and Tress MacNeille in 2 episodes) is now a corporate criminal and most of her plans revolve around getting richer, tormenting the dalmatians and plotting to steal the Dearly Farm. Her frequent catchphrase in the series is "Memo to myself", followed by whatever her current scheme is or sometimes her emotional state, uttered into her personal recording device.
- Horace (voiced by David Lander) and Jasper (voiced by Michael McKean) are Cruella's henchmen. They are usually hired to carry out her plans and generally fail, due to their lack of intelligence.

=== Supporting ===
- Pongo (voiced by Kevin Schon) is the father of fifteen puppies, the adopted father of the eighty-four orphaned pups and the husband of Perdita. He is Roger's devoted pet.
- Perdita (voiced by Pam Dawber) is the mother of fifteen puppies, the adoptive mother of eighty-four orphaned pups and the wife of Pongo. She is Anita's beloved pet.
- Nanny (voiced by Charlotte Rae) is Dearlys' caretaker who helps Roger and Anita around the Dearly Farm, also helps with feeding the dalmatians from the huge Chow Tower that she operates with a bike.
- Mooch (voiced by Danny Cooksey) is an adolescent sheepdog mix who is the bully of the farm. He can sometimes be intimidating, but deep down he is very sensitive and nice.
- Two-Tone (voiced by Tara Strong) is one of the dalmatian puppies and Mooch's ex-girlfriend and second-in-command. She is depicted as half-black with white spots and half white with black spots. She is a tomboy who loves fashion and has a crush on Lucky.
- Dipstick (voiced by Thom Adcox-Hernandez) is a male dalmatian puppy who is the most dimwitted of Mooch's gang. He is constantly infested with fleas. In some episodes, he has a soft side.
- Whizzer (voiced by Pamela Adlon in "Purred It Through the Grapevine" and Christine Cavanaugh for the rest of the series) is a male dalmatian puppy and bladder control issues who is part of Mooch's gang.
- Patch (voiced by Justin Shenkarow) is the older male dalmatian of the dalmatian puppies.
- Tripod (voiced by Toran Caudell) is a male dalmatian puppy who serves as Lucky's friendly rival. He has spotted ears, a green headband and is missing his front left leg.
- Scorch (voiced by Frank Welker) is Cruella's pet ferret who has an appetite for Spot.
- Vendella De Vil (voiced by Tara Strong) is Cruella's pet Afghan Hound.
- The Colonel (voiced by Jim Cummings) is an old English sheepdog and commanding officer of the Bark Brigade.
- Sergeant Tibbs (voiced by Jeff Bennett) is a cat and trusted ally of the Colonel.
- Captain (voiced by Frank Welker) is a horse on the Dearly Farm who is usually seen helping Nanny.
- Lieutenant Pug (voiced by Jeff Bennett) is one of the training officers of the Bark Brigade. He is paranoid about a potential feline invasion. He gets very brutal with the main pups and has a habit of insulting them, and has narcolepsy.
- Thunderbolt (voiced by Frank Welker) is a German shepherd and Lucky's favorite superhero.
- Cornelia (voiced by Tress MacNeille) is Spot's overprotective mother who wants her to behave like a chicken.
- Lucy (voiced by Paddi Edwards) is a goose who gets grumpy when the dalmatians play in her pond at Hiccup Hole.
- Swamp Rat (voiced by Jeff Bennett) is a rat salesman who lives in the swamp.
- Steven the Alligator (voiced by Frank Welker) is Swamp Rat's associate and is fixated on eating Spot.
- Cydne (voiced by Frank Welker) is a snake who lives in the swamp and Swamp Rat's other associate.
- Mayor Ed Pig (voiced by Jim Cummings) is a pig who is the mayor of the animals on the Dearly Farm.
- Dumpling (voiced by Christine Cavanaugh) is Mayor Ed's daughter who has an unrequited crush on Lucky.
- Princess (voiced by April Winchell in "The High Price of Fame" and "Shake, Rattle and Woof" and Cree Summer for the rest of the series) is a cow who lives on the Dearly Farm.
- Duchess (voiced by Marla Gibbs) is a cow and a companion of Princess.

== Production ==
In March 1996, Disney announced an animated television series based on the 1961 film One Hundred and One Dalmatians, created in a partnership between Disney and Kellogg's ordered for 52 episodes with two cartoons and one comedy bit in between each. The series was developed by Jim Jinkins, who had previously created Doug and Allegra's Window for Nickelodeon, and his partner David Ray Campbell, both serving as executive producers alongside Bobs Gannaway and Tony Craig, who were previously the supervising producers of The Lion King's Timon & Pumbaa, another television adaptation of a Disney animated feature film, being The Lion King. Gannaway commented that since the animated film and the live-action remake were really about the human characters, they wanted to make the show about the puppies' individual personalities. The producers also gave the series its own highly stylized look, different from that of the original film, and even tackled the character of Cruella de Vil. Gannaway stated that they needed to expand her so that she would become more of a greedy character, which he found to be daunting as Cruella was a beloved Disney villain. The show used the thick-and-thin line approach from Hanna-Barbera's 2 Stupid Dogs, another television series which Gannaway and Craig previously worked on. Alongside Gannaway and Craig, many of the staff had been previously involved with The Lion King's Timon & Pumbaa.

== Release ==
=== Broadcast ===
The show debuted in weekday syndication on the Disney-Kellogg Alliance block on September 1, 1997, with five episodes airing throughout the week. The series was intended to also be co-simulcasted on ABC's One Saturday Morning programing block on September 6, 1997, but the premiere was delayed a week due to the funeral of Diana, Princess of Wales.

In total, 65 half-hour episodes with 105 episode segments were produced. 13 episodes were broadcast on ABC (which would exclusively air on the channel until 1998): 3 full-length episodes, and 10 with 2 segments each. 52 episodes would premiere during syndication: 22 full-length episodes, and 30 with 2 segments each. On March 4, 1998, the show aired its last episode with reruns continuing to play in syndication through August 28, 1998. The show would remain on ABC until September 4, 1999.

Following the show's removal from syndication, the ABC and syndicated episodes would be broadcast together. Reruns of the show aired on Disney Channel from 1998 to 1999 and Toon Disney from September 1, 1998, to March 9, 2007.

On March 23, 2012, the show returned to television as a launch title for the Disney Junior channel, but only about half of the episodes aired and most of them were edited down. On September 3, 2013, the series was removed from Disney Junior's lineup.

=== Home media ===
While the series as a whole never made a true home media release either on VHS or DVD, the episode, "A Christmas Cruella", was released on VHS in 1998, which also contained the episode "Coup De Vil" as a bonus episode. This was also released on DVD in the UK.

The 3-part series finale, "Dalmatian Vacation", was also released on VHS and Laserdisc in Japan, which included two songs that were exclusive to this release and not on the TV broadcasts of the trilogy of episodes.

=== Streaming ===
The series has been available on the iTunes Store and Amazon Prime Video since February 2017, with the exception of the episode "Alive N' Chicken"/"Prima Doggy". In May 2020, the entire series became available on Disney+ in Australia, and on the US version of Disney+ on June 19, 2020, with all 65 episodes arranged mostly in order of broadcast, including "Alive N' Chicken"/"Prima Doggy".

== Episodes ==
The order of the episodes is presented in general broadcast order for both ABC and syndication, but as the actual first chronological episode had its premiere on ABC, the episodes that premiered on ABC are listed first before the syndicated episodes.

=== Series overview ===
Season	Segments	Episodes	Originally released	
Season	Segments	Episodes	First released	Last released
ABC	23	13	September 13, 1997	January 10, 1998
Syndication	82	52	September 1, 1997	March 4, 1998

=== ABC (1997–1998) ===
No. overall	No. in season	Title	Directed by	Written by	Storyboarded by	Original release date	Prod. code	Packaging code
1	1	"Home Is Where the Bark Is"	Rick Schneider	Bobs Gannaway	Cynthia Petrovic & Amber Tornquist	September 13, 1997	DL-1 (Note: Intended packaging code for segment.) 4338-012 (Note: Production code for standalone segments.)	DL-11 (Note: Overall broadcast code; as retained for streaming.) DL-54 (Note: Syndication code; used for U.S. syndication and broadcast in international countries.)
Roger and Anita are planning to move to the countryside thinking it would be better for their dogs. Three particular pups – Lucky, Rolly and Cadpig – are against the idea of moving from their city home, but they end up moving there anyway. Lucky, Rolly and Cadpig are not happy with their new home, so they decide to travel back to their old home only to discover it's not as fun as they remember it. This is when they realize home is actually being with family, so they decide to head back to the farm and settle there, but Cruella holds them there for ransom to try to make Roger and Anita sell their farm to her.
2	2	"Full Metal Pullet"	Tony Craig & Bobs Gannaway	Carin Greenberg Baker	Joey Banaszkiewicz	September 20, 1997	DL-6A 4338-020	DL-16 DL-53
2	2	"Dough the Right Thing"	Tony Craig & Bobs Gannaway	Mirith J.S. Colao	Craig Kemplin	September 20, 1997	DL-12A 4338-031	DL-16 DL-53
While forming the Bark Brigade, Lucky has a hard time accepting Spot into his team because she's a chicken, but he soon sees that there are many benefits to having her on their team. The main pups think Cruella left her purse behind and return it to her. When they later discover that it was really Anita's purse, they must try to steal it back.
3	3	"He Followed Me Home"	Victor Cook	Mirith J.S. Colao	Sean Bishop	September 27, 1997	DL-32A 4338-070	DL-21 DL-55
3	3	"Love 'Em and Flea 'Em"	Tony Craig & Bobs Gannaway	Ken Koonce & Michael Merton	Edward Baker	September 27, 1997	DL-5A 4338-036	DL-21 DL-55
A circus elephant named Jimbo escapes from his circus train and follows Rolly back to the farm. The main pups try to take care of him while at the same time keep him hidden from Roger, Anita and Cruella. The pups are unaware that Cruella does know about Jimbo, and, thinking the Dearlys are keeping him as a pet, tries to expose this to force them to leave the farm. With the pups' annual fall ball approaching, Two-Tone is expecting Mooch to ask her out, but after acting rude with her, Two-Tone decides to break up with Mooch. Lucky offers to take Two-Tone to the dance instead. When Mooch finds out about this, he gets revenge on Lucky by getting him infested with fleas and then dying his fur pink during his flea bath.
4	4	"Howl Noon"	Rick Schneider	Ken Koonce & Michael Merton	David Fulp	October 4, 1997	DL-33B 4338-073	DL-25 DL-56
4	4	"Easy on the Lies"	Ken Boyer	Bruce Shelly & Anne Baumgarten	Phil Mosness	October 4, 1997	DL-33A 4338-072	DL-25 DL-56
When the main pups learn about Lt. Pug's old nemesis, Persian Pete, coming for him, Cadpig insists they try to help him overcome his fear and face off with him. After hearing one of the Colonel's boring stories, Rolly jokingly says that he wants to hear it again, but Colonel takes it seriously and sets up a time to tell it to him again. This conflicts with the main pups' schedule as they were going to go swimming at that time and could not reschedule, so Rolly fakes being sick for the Colonel and the pups have to find a way to get to Hiccup Hole without getting caught by Colonel or Sgt. Tibbs.
5	5	"Two for the Show"	Skip Jones	Jess Winfield	Jill Colbert	October 11, 1997	DL-34B 4338-068	DL-27 DL-57
5	5	"An Officer and a Gentledog"	Tony Craig & Bobs Gannaway	Fracaswell Hyman	Craig Kemplin	October 11, 1997	DL-3A 4338-015	DL-27 DL-57
Lucky wants to compete on the game show "Squeal of Fortune", and trains his friends to find who has what it takes to be his partner on the show. However, Lucky's pushy antics cause all his friends to turn against him. Fed up with Tripod always beating him at all the Bark Brigade courses and Lt. Pug calling him a loser, Lucky is determined to win an obstacle course before Tripod does.
6	6	"Bad to the Bone"	Skip Jones	Don Gillies	Linda Miller	October 18, 1997	DL-37B 4338-078	DL-29 DL-58
6	6	"Southern Fried Cruella"	Ken Boyer	Bruce Shelly & Anne Baumgarten	Dan Mills	October 18, 1997	DL-36B 4338-079	DL-29 DL-58
Rolly is getting sick of Mooch and his gang bullying him because he's such a softy. He tries to prove he can be tough by beating up a snake skin in front of them, tricking them into believing it's Cydne the snake. Mooch has Rolly join his gang, but how long can Rolly keep up this charade? When the Dearlys leave for a while, Cruella tricks Nanny into leaving too and poses as a farmer to try to get a business man to make a deal with her as one of her schemes to try to expand her business onto the farm.
7	7	"Swine Song"	Victor Cook	Cydne Clark & Steve Granat	Bob Logan	October 25, 1997	DL-20A 4338-045	DL-31 DL-59
7	7	"Watch for Falling Idols"	Rick Schneider	Jess Winfield	Byron Vaughns	October 25, 1997	DL-41B 4338-082	DL-31 DL-59
Rolly falls in love with Dumpling, so his friends try to get Dumpling to fall for him. Thunderbolt, Lucky's favorite superhero, comes to Dearly Farm to film his next episode. Lucky is excited at first, but he soon discovers that his idol is a fraud since he relies on stunt doubles to do his stunts for him.
8	8	"The High Price of Fame"	Skip Jones	Don Gillies	Jill Colbert	November 1, 1997	DL-24B 4338-047	DL-34 DL-60
8	8	"The Great Cat Invasion"	Skip Jones	David Hemingson	Garret Ho & Alan Wright	November 1, 1997	DL-34A 4338-067	DL-34 DL-60
Spot is fed up with the pups treating her like a clown, but her antics soon make the farm residents view her as a hero, and she lets the appreciation start to get to her head. The main pups are fed up with Lt. Pug spreading rumors about a cat invasion and think it's all a hoax, but they soon find out it's real when a mob of cats unexpectedly invades the farm and make themselves at home there.
9	9	"No Train, No Gain"	Rick Schneider	Len Uhley	Cynthia Petrovic & Amber Tornquist	November 8, 1997	DL-42 4338-085	DL-37 DL-61
Cruella takes a train car for her business, but this train car happens to be where the Colonel lives. The main pups work together to try to bring the Colonel's train car back to where it rightfully belongs.
10	10	"Rolly's Egg-Celent Adventure"	Skip Jones	Bruce Talkington	Larry Leker	November 15, 1997	DL-45A 4338-086	DL-41 DL-62
10	10	"Wild Chick Chase"	Rick Schneider	Mirith J.S. Colao	David Fulp	November 15, 1997	DL-21B 4338-048	DL-41 DL-62
Rolly volunteers to sit on some eggs for Spot. The eggs hatch, and the baby chicks think Rolly is their mother. Rolly decides to raise the chicks as his own children and tries to keep them out of danger as best he can. The main pups are planning another swim day at Hiccup Hole, but Spot has to babysit Peeps the chick. She brings her along, but it turns out Peeps is much more of a handful than Spot expected. Now, Spot and the pups have to work together to keep Peeps out of danger.
11	11	"The Dogs of De Vil"	Rick Schneider	Chris Hubbell & Sam Graham	Joey Banaszkiewicz, Sean Bishop, Kevin Davis, Julie Forte, David Knott, Aaron Rozenfeld & Charles Wester	November 22, 1997	DL-16A 4338-039	DL-45 DL-63
11	11	"Dog's Best Friend"	Rick Schneider	Thomas Hart	James Fletcher	November 22, 1997	DL-39B 4338-080	DL-45 DL-63
When Cruella calls Anita into work on a day the Dearlys were planning to go on a picnic, the main pups think Roger and Anita as well as Pongo and Perdita are getting a divorce and are now determined to try to get them back together again. A German Shepherd pup named Blaze visits the farm. Lucky thinks he's cool and wants to hang out with him, but Rolly gets jealous thinking that Blaze is stealing his brother away from him.
12	12	"A Christmas Cruella"	Victor Cook	Ken Koonce & Michael Merton	Denise Koyama & Yi-Chih Chen	December 20, 1997	DL-38 4338-083	DL-48 DL-65
On Christmas Eve, Cruella De Vil turns into Ebenezer Scrooge as Christmas Ghosts (played by the main pups) visit her to try to reform her for Christmas Day.
13	13	"Out to Launch"	Ken Boyer	Don Gillies	Charles Harvey & Wendell Washer	January 10, 1998	DL-52B 4338-100	DL-50 DL-64
13	13	"Prophet and Loss"	Skip Jones	Thomas Hart	Enrique May, Rossen Varbanov & Alan Wright	January 10, 1998	DL-53B 4338-098	DL-50 DL-64
The main pups discover a rocket underneath Cruella's mansion, and the rocket blasts them off into space. While up there, they find out that Cruella is reprogramming this spaceship to become the first gym in space. The pups try to help out the ship's computer, VLAD, to get him out of Cruella's scheme and help him fulfill his destiny once they are returned to Earth. After predicting that Rolly would win a race and saving the farm animals from a falling windmill, Spot's mother, Cornelia, believes that Cadpig is psychic, and the other farm residents come to her to predict their futures. Cadpig decides to play along, but when her predictions end up falling flat, things backfire on her. Cadpig is now determined to get the farm to love her again.

=== Syndication (1997–1998) ===
No. overall	No. in season	Title	Directed by	Written by	Storyboarded by	Original release date	Prod. code	Packaging code
14	1	"You Slipped a Disk"	Tony Craig & Bobs Gannaway	Mirith J.S. Colao	Amber Tornquist	September 1, 1997	DL-2B 4338-014	DL-1
14	1	"Chow About That?"	Tony Craig & Bobs Gannaway	Mirith J.S. Colao	Cynthia Petrovic	September 1, 1997	DL-2A 4338-013	DL-1
Roger has created a new video game and asks Lucky to help guard the disk he has saved it on, but he winds up losing the disk and drags Rolly and Cadpig along to help him get it back. When the pups miss lunch, they come up with various attempts to get into the Chow Tower, but aren't listening to what Spot is trying to tell them.
15	2	"Tic Track Toe"	Tony Craig & Bobs Gannaway	Mirith J.S. Colao	David Fulp	September 2, 1997	DL-12B 4338-032	DL-2
15	2	"Lucky All Star"	Victor Cook	Carin Greenberg Baker & Fracaswell Hyman	Bob Onorato	September 2, 1997	DL-11B 4338-030	DL-2
The main pups' favorite track star Greyhound, Go-Go, known as the fastest dog in the world, loses a race for the first time. The main pups decide to try to figure out what is wrong with him so that they can help him regain his fame. It turns out he has a fear of bunnies, and the pups have a hard time trying to get him to overcome his fear. Roger picks Tripod to enroll in a bone-digging contest. Lucky gets jealous that Roger picked Tripod instead of him and fears that if Tripod will be Roger's new favorite if he wins. Lucky is now determined to try to stop him.
16	3	"Shake, Rattle and Woof"	Victor Cook	Bruce Shelly & Reed Shelly	Francisco Barrios, Todd Britton & Shawna Cha	September 3, 1997	DL-15A 4338-037	DL-3 DL-10
16	3	"Cadpig Behind Bars"	Ken Boyer	Ken Koonce & Michael Merton	Phil Mosness	September 3, 1997	DL-19A 4338-043	DL-3 DL-10
Cruella overhears Roger recording the main pups barks to make a new song and decides to set up a hoedown at the farm with the pups as the stars, but things go south as the pups are forced to do things Cruella's way. Cadpig gets locked in the pound and drives the other dogs crazy while Lucky, Rolly and Lt. Pug try to rescue her.
17	4	"Leisure Lawsuit" (Note: Working title: "Insult to Injury")	Tony Craig & Bobs Gannaway	Cydne Clark & Steve Granat	Cynthia Petrovic	September 4, 1997	DL-15A 4338-024	DL-4
17	4	"Purred It Through the Grapevine"	Ken Boyer	Carin Greenberg Baker & David Hemingson	Phil Mosness	September 4, 1997	DL-19A 4338-021	DL-4
Cruella fakes an injury on the farm and tries to file a lawsuit against the Dearlys so that they are forced to sell the farm to them. The main pups know she's faking, so they try to expose her fraud. Lucky, Rolly, Cadpig and Spot sleep through a class on barking code, and when they hear a message in code, they have to try to figure out what it means.
18	5	"Our Own Digs"	Rick Schneider	Bobs Gannaway & Fracaswell Hyman	Rich Chidlaw	September 5, 1997	DL-3B 4338-016	DL-5
18	5	"Goose Pimples"	Ken Boyer	Don Gillies	Joe Suggs	September 5, 1997	DL-19B 4338-044	DL-5
The main pups try to find a new hangout to get away from all the chaos in the farm. They find one, but it is soon hijacked by Lt. Pug. Meanwhile, Cruella is making a new line of fashions out of haybales, and now the pups have to try to stop her and save Pug. After a long, grueling night hike, the main pups seem to be disappearing one-by-one due to the legendary beast Lock Jaw. Are they really being eaten alive, or is something else going on?
19	6	"Two Faces of Anita"	Skip Jones	Bruce Talkington	Enrique May, Rossen Varbanov, Wendell Washer & Suraiya Daud	September 8, 1997	DL-18 4338-042	DL-6 DL-32
Anita has just won the award for Designer of the Year. Cruella is jealous that she didn't win and sets up a scheme so that she gets the award instead of Anita. The main pups work together to make sure that doesn't happen.
20	7	"The Fungus Among Us"	Ken Boyer	Richard Dubin	Charles Harvey, Dan Mills & Jill Colbert	September 9, 1997	DL-4 4338-017	DL-7 DL-24
Cruella discovers scented mushrooms underneath the Dearly Farm and asks Horace and Jasper to dig them out for her so that she can make a perfume out of them. The main pups try to stop them.
21	8	"Market Mayhem"	Victor Cook	Bruce Shelly & Reed Shelly	Carin-Anne Anderson	September 10, 1997	DL-15B 4338-038	DL-8 DL-3
21	8	"Lucky to Be Alone" (Note: Working title: "Lucky in the City")	Skip Jones	David Hemingson	Jill Colbert	September 10, 1997	DL-19A 4338-027	DL-8 DL-3
When the Dearlys run out of dog food, Nanny decides to go to the grocery store, but thinking Kanine Krunchies are too expensive, she decides to buy a cheaper brand. The main pups stow away with Nanny to make sure she buys Kanine Krunchies instead. Fed up with things being too crowded with all the puppies at the farm, Lucky asks Pongo and Perdita if there's a possibility for him to get a room of his own. They decide to send him to live with his aunt and uncle. At first, Lucky enjoys this life, but he soon realizes things are not the same without his brothers and sisters.
22	9	"Four Stories Up"	Skip Jones	Holly Huckins	Garrett Ho, Alan Wright & Christopher Headrick	September 11, 1997	DL-14 4338-035	DL-9
When a new episode of Thunderbolt is interrupted by a telethon run by Cruella, the main pups decide to pass the time by predicting how they think the episode will end. Each pup comes up with their own idea for the ending.
23	10	"It's a Swamp Thing"	Tony Craig & Bobs Gannaway	David Hemingson & Frank Conniff	David Fulp	September 12, 1997	DL-5B 4338-019	DL-10 DL-13
23	10	"Roll Out the Pork Barrel"	Ken Boyer	David Hemingson	Dan Mills	September 12, 1997	DL-35A 4338-056	DL-10 DL-13
Colonel gives Lucky his prized scarf to wear for a day. While visiting the swamp, Swamp Rat steals the scarf from Lucky, and he and the other main pups have to try to get the scarf back. Rolly is fed up with his friends mocking him over his weight, so he decides to hang out with Ed Pig. While living this new life, Lucky, Cadpig and Spot start to have second thoughts on whether or not Rolly should be their friend anymore.
24	11	"Alive N' Chicken"	Rick Schneider	Mirith J.S. Colao	Craig Kemplin	September 15, 1997	DL-21A 4338-049	DL-12 DL-31
24	11	"Prima Doggy"	Ken Boyer	Ken Koonce & Michael Merton	Chris Rutkowski & Rebecca Shen	September 15, 1997	DL-7B 4338-023	DL-12 DL-31
When Spot overhears a conversation between Anita and Nanny, she thinks they're talking about her. Believing she's going to die tomorrow, she comes crying to the pups. The pups know she's mistaken but decide to humor her anyway by having her enjoy life more. Lucky sees an ad for a new Kanine Krunchies flavor and sees that they are holding auditions for dogs to be in a commercial. He auditions and gets the job, but being a star turns out to be much more difficult than Lucky expected.
25	12	"You Say It's Your Birthday"	Victor Cook	Douglas Allen Booth	Butch Hartman & Denise Koyama	September 16, 1997	DL-17 4338-040	DL-13 DL-7
Roger gives away his old teddy bears, but the main pups overhear Roger and think he is talking about selling the pups to Cruella. Meanwhile, Cruella thinks Anita is planning to do something big with her biggest rival in the fashion industry. Little do they all know, Roger, Anita and Nanny are actually planning a birthday party for the pups.
26	13	"Oozy Does It"	Victor Cook	Douglas Allen Booth	Bob Logan	September 17, 1997	DL-30A 4338-063	DL-14 DL-22
26	13	"Barnboozled"	Ken Boyer	Jonathan Greenberg	Joe Horne	September 17, 1997	DL-16B 4338-033	DL-14 DL-22
Hiccup Hole is polluted by waste from Cruella's new jeans factory. The pups now must put an end to Cruella's polluting habits. Cruella decides to move into the farm with the pups. This becomes a huge inconvenience for them, so they try to make things miserable for her to force her to leave.
27	14	"Citizen Canine"	Ken Boyer	Jonathan Greenberg	Charles Harvey & Dan Mills	September 18, 1997	DL-13 4338-034	DL-15 DL-14
Ed Pig lets leadership get to his head and starts passing unfair laws on the farm. Feeling that he crossed the line, Lucky decides to run against Ed for mayor to overturn his unfair laws. However, Lucky learns that becoming mayor and being the mayor are a lot harder than he thought.
28	15	"Frisky Business"	Skip Jones	David Hemingson	Larry Leker	September 22, 1997	DL-9A 4338-026	DL-17 DL-8
28	15	"Cadet of the Month"	Ken Boyer	Kathryn Likkel	Charles Harvey	September 22, 1997	DL-37A 4338-076	DL-17 DL-8
The main pups hear about a special event going on at the Stiffle Mall, but because of how distant it is, they need transportation. They hijack Cruella's car and things do not go well. Lucky tries to set up a scheme to earn paw merits in the Bark Brigade so that he can be a higher rank than Tripod.
29	16	"Valentine Daze"	Skip Jones	Bruce Talkington	Enrique May, Rossen Varbanov & Wendell Washer	September 23, 1997	DL-28 4338-060	DL-18
Roger creates a special present for Anita for Valentine's Day. The present ends up in the wrong hands, and the main pups have to get it back to Roger before it's too late.
30	17	"Close But No Cigar"	Tony Craig, Bobs Gannaway & Rick Schneider	Cydne Clark & Steve Granat	Amber Tornquist	September 25, 1997	DL-8B 4338-025	DL-19 DL-25
30	17	"Invasion of the Doggy Snatchers"	Victor Cook	David Hemingson	Carin-Anne Anderson	September 25, 1997	DL-22B 4338-050	DL-19 DL-25
The main pups are excited about going to the Grutely County Fair, especially since Thunderbolt is going to be there. The main pups end up missing the bus because they were too busy watching an episode of Thunderbolt, and now they have to go on a journey to find the fair themselves before they miss it. After watching a sci-fi movie, Spot notices the pups are acting very strange and suspects they might have been possessed by aliens.
31	18	"Smoke Detectors"	Skip Jones	Jess Winfield	Alan Wright	September 26, 1997	DL-29A 4338-061	DL-20 DL-16
31	18	"Lobster Tale" (Note: Working title: "Born Free")	Ken Boyer	Jess Winfield	Joe Suggs	September 26, 1997	DL-32B 4338-071	DL-20 DL-16
After burning down a room in her house, Cruella decides to move in with the Dearlys so that they can help her quit smoking. The pups try to help her too, hoping to be rid of her as soon as possible. Cadpig sees a lobster at a seafood takeout place. She decides to rescue the lobster and find a new home for him where he will be safe from anyone who wants to eat him.
32	19	"Double Dog Dare"	Ken Boyer	Douglas Allen Booth	Chris Rutkowski	September 29, 1997	DL-22A 4338-041	DL-22 DL-6
32	19	"Mooove It On Over"	Skip Jones	Thomas Hart	Larry Leker	September 29, 1997	DL-35B 4338-069	DL-22 DL-6
Spot is double dog dared to steal Cruella's sleeping mask. After discovering that Lucky has never been double dog dared, Rolly and Cadpig dare him to help Spot. The pups are annoyed by Duchess and Princess bickering over the lack of space they have between them. Cadpig tries to help them out, but she ends up making things worse instead.
33	20	"Shipwrecked"	Victor Cook	Bruce Talkington	Bob Logan, Bob Onorato & David Schwartz	October 1, 1997	DL-10 4338-028	DL-23 DL-12
Roger, Anita and Cruella go on a cruise together. The main pups stowaway on the cruise, but when a storm hits, Lucky and Scorch fall off the boat and are stranded on an island together. Lucky's friends try to find and save him.
34	21	"Mall Pups"	Victor Cook	Bruce Shelly & Reed Shelly	Todd Britton & Butch Hartman	October 3, 1997	DL-25 4338-055	DL-24 DL-20
The main pups go to the Stiffle Mall to see Thunderbolt, but they get lost in the mall. Realizing that they are ditching map-reading class in Bark Brigade, Lt. Pug goes to the mall to scout them out.
35	22	"Shrewzle Watch"	Ken Boyer	Don Gillies	Chris Rutkowski	October 6, 1997	DL-39A 4338-084	DL-26 DL-21
35	22	"The Life You Save"	Ken Boyer	Thomas Hart	Joe Horne	October 6, 1997	DL-27A 4338-058	DL-26 DL-21
The Dearlys discover that a tree shrewzle was spotted at their farm, and because of this they are required to follow some new guidelines or else leave the farm. The main pups soon find out this was a scheme set up by Cruella. Lucky accidentally saves Dumpling's life, and Dumpling will not leave him alone. Lucky tries everything he can to get Dumpling out of his fur.
36	23	"Spots and Shots" (Note: Working title: "No Pain, No Gain")	Ken Boyer	Mirith J.S. Colao & Fracaswell Hyman	Joey Banaszkiewicz, Joe Suggs & Rebecca Shen	October 13, 1997	DL-11A 4338-029	DL-28 DL-17
36	23	"On the Lamb"	Ken Boyer	Don Gillies	Charles Harvey & Rebecca Shen	October 13, 1997	DL-27B 4338-059	DL-28 DL-17
When the vet comes to give the puppies their rabies shots, Lucky tries to avoid getting his shot. When the pups hear about a lamb being on the loose in the city, Lucky decides to play the superhero Thunderbolt once again and try to track him down, but all Lucky's plans end up backfiring as the lamb turns out to be a lot tougher than he expected.
37	24	"Treasure of Swamp Island"	Rick Schneider	Bruce Talkington	Craig Kemplin	October 20, 1997	DL-31B 4338-077	DL-30 DL-11
37	24	"Lord of the Termites" (Note: Working title: "The Bald and the Beautiful")	Skip Jones	Cydne Clark & Steve Granat	Larry Leker	October 20, 1997	DL-20B 4338-046	DL-30 DL-11
Lucky thinks there is treasure on an island at the swamp. He's right: Cruella was hiding a treasure chest there to try to keep it secret from the government. Cruella forces the Dearlys to temporarily vacate their house after discovering it is infested with termites. The main pups were left behind and decide to hang out and do whatever they want. They also try to outsmart Horace and Jasper when they invade the house.
38	25	"Fountain of Youth"	Skip Jones	Don London & Mirith J.S. Colao	Christopher Headrick & Garrett Ho	October 30, 1997	DL-23B 4338-052	DL-32 DL-15
38	25	"Walk a Mile in My Tracks"	Ken Boyer	David Hemingson	Joe Horne & Shawna Cha	October 30, 1997	DL-41A 4338-081	DL-32 DL-15
Tired of aging, Cruella ends up believing the Dearlys' water has the power to grant youth, so she hires Horace and Jasper to try to steal the Dearlys' water supply. The main pups try to stop them. Lt. Pug and Cornelia decide to swap their duties on the farm. Things go downhill as the pups discover Cornelia is a worse instructor than Pug while Pug is failing at all of his chicken duties.
39	26	"Cruella World"	Rick Schneider	Jan Strnad	Cynthia Petrovic & Amber Tornquist	October 31, 1997	DL-43 4338-057	DL-33 DL-27
Cruella builds a theme park that runs on oil, which turns out to be bad for the swamp. Lucky tries to get his friends to help him, but they don't believe him after all the overexaggerated stories he told them. Now Lucky must work alone to set things right.
40	27	"Hail to the Chief" (Note: Working title: "Fire Dogs")	Skip Jones	Bruce Shelly & Anne Baumgarten	Christopher Headrick	November 3, 1997	DL-45B 4338-088	DL-35 DL-30
40	27	"Food for Thought"	Rick Schneider	Don London	Edward Baker	November 3, 1997	DL-23A 4338-051	DL-35 DL-30
Rolly thinks he has what it takes to be a chief firedog after noticing his striking resemblance to his late uncle. Lucky and Cadpig don't believe him, but he doesn't listen to them. Rolly gets caught by an ice cream truck driver who turns out to be Cruella's cousin and gets drunk on a new ice cream flavor. Lucky, Cadpig and Spot try to save him with help from Pongo and Perdita.
41	28	"The Maltese Chicken"	Victor Cook	Kathryn Likkel	Bob Logan, Bob Onorato & David Schwartz	November 7, 1997	DL-43 4338-087	DL-36 DL-23
Cornelia lays a gigantic egg that amazes everyone on the farm, but the next day it mysteriously disappears. Spot decides to solve the mystery of the missing egg and has the rest of the main pups help her.
42	29	"Film Fatale"	Ken Boyer	Ken Koonce & Michael Merton	Joe Horne & Rebecca Shen	November 10, 1997	DL-7A 4338-022	DL-38 DL-28
42	29	"My Fair Chicken" (Note: Working title: "Cage of Innocnce")	Rick Schneider	Mirith J.S. Colao	Craig Kemplin	November 10, 1997	DL-46A 4338-090	DL-38 DL-28
The main pups try to sneak into Cruella's cineplex to watch a new Thunderbolt movie. Cornelia is trying to get Spot to act more like a chicken and less like a dog. The main pups try to help her but don't have much luck.
43	30	"Snow Bounders"	Rick Schneider	Ken Koonce & Michael Merton	Debra Pugh, Aaron Rozenfeld & Charles Wester	November 11, 1997	DL-29B 4338-062	DL-39 DL-19
43	30	"Gnaw or Never"	Rick Schneider	Don Gillies	Debra Pugh	November 11, 1997	DL-46B 4338-091	DL-39 DL-19
The main pups go with Roger and Pongo on a camping trip up in the mountains. They work together to try to survive the sub-zero weather. When Rolly bites into one of Cruella's shoes, he all of a sudden becomes obsessed with chewing on shoes, and now his friends need to try to snap him out of it.
44	31	"Poison Ivy"	Skip Jones	Ken Koonce & Michael Merton	Garrett Ho, Linda Miller & Alan Wright	November 14, 1997	DL-47A 4338-092	DL-40 DL-26
44	31	"Twelve Angry Pups"	Victor Cook	Ken Koonce & Michael Merton	Sean Bishop & Shawna Cha	November 14, 1997	DL-24A 4338-053	DL-40 DL-26
Cruella's niece, Ivy, visits the farm and frames the puppies for doing bad things. Mooch is put on trial for stealing things that belong to the Dearly Farm residents. Mooch tries to prove his innocence while also trying to find out who the real culprit is.
45	32	"The Good-Bye Chick"	Ken Boyer	Jess Winfield	Phil Mosness & Joe Suggs	November 17, 1997	DL-44 4338-089	DL-42 DL-34
Cornelia is once again fed up with Spot acting like a dog instead of a chicken. Unsure about what she thinks she really is, Spot decides to run away from home to find out where she truly belongs. The main pups go out to find her and bring her back.
46	33	"Robo-Rolly"	Skip Jones	Ken Koonce & Michael Merton	Linda Miller	November 20, 1997	DL-47B 4338-093	DL-43 DL-36
46	33	"Splishing and Splashing"	Victor Cook	Keith Kaczorek	Carin-Anne Anderson	November 20, 1997	DL-36A 4338-074	DL-43 DL-36
P.H. De Vil creates a robot clone of Rolly so that Cruella can spy on Anita. The real Rolly is kidnapped and the rest of the main pups have to find him and save him. Pongo and Perdita have restricted the main pups from swimming in Hiccup Hole until they apologize to Lucy for disrespecting her. Lucky refuses to apologize. Not wanting to tolerate the hot weather, Lucky tries to find a new place with water for them to swim in.
47	34	"Virtual Lucky"	Skip Jones	Jan Strnad	Enrique May & Rossen Varbanov	November 21, 1997	DL-40 4338-075	DL-44 DL-29
Roger is working on a new video game that he is excited to share with Cruella. While Cruella is there, the computer glitches out causing Cruella and the pups to be transported inside the video game. They must complete the game in order to return home.
48	35	"Cupid Pups"	Rick Schneider	Thomas Hart	James Fletcher, Byron Vaughns, Enrique May & Rossen Varbanov	November 24, 1997	DL-49 4338-096	DL-46 DL-37
The Dearlys are invited to Cruella's engagement party. The main pups try to make sure things go right for Cruella so that she can win the heart of her soon to be fiancé in the hopes that she will finally move away from the farm.
49	36	"The Artist Formerly Known as Spot"	Ken Boyer	Regge Bulman & Clay Eide	Dan Mills	November 25, 1997	DL-48B 4338-095	DL-47 DL-33
49	36	"The Nose Knows"	Ken Boyer	Len Uhley	Chris Rutkowski	November 25, 1997	DL-30B 4338-064	DL-47 DL-33
Spot makes artwork that Cruella finds to be profitable, and Cruella decides to use Spot for her own benefit. Rolly is in danger of being kicked out of the Bark Brigade until the pups discover that Rolly's incredible sense of smell could potentially save his reputation despite what Lt. Pug thinks.
50	37	"K Is For Kibble"	Victor Cook	Jan Strnad	Carin-Anne Anderson, Sean Bishop & Todd Britton	January 5, 1998	DL-50 4338-097	DL-49 DL-35
All the kibble at the farm is mysteriously disappearing. Spot tries to solve the mystery of the disappearing kibble. Most of the farm residents believe that Rolly is the culprit behind all this, but is he really?
51	38	"Humanitarian of the Year"	Skip Jones	Mirith J.S. Colao	Christopher Headrick & Larry Leker	January 12, 1998	DL-56 4338-106	DL-51 DL-40
Cruella is on her way to become Humanitarian of the Year until the main pups come across some old photos of all the bad things Cruella has done in the past. Now, they must find the executive to show Cruella's true colors.
52	39	"Beauty Pageant Pandemonium" (Note: Working title: "Pageant Pandemonium")	Victor Cook	Bruce Shelly & Anne Baumgarten	David Schwartz	January 16, 1998	DL-52A 4338-099	DL-52 DL-42
52	39	"Hog Tied"	Victor Cook	Len Uhley	Bob Onorato	January 16, 1998	DL-55B 4338-105	DL-52 DL-42
Anita enrolls her niece, Amber, into a beauty pageant, but Cruella enrolls Ivy in the same pageant. Cruella sets up a scheme to make sure Ivy wins, but the main pups try to make sure Amber wins. Bored with her life, Dumpling decides to hang out with the main pups, but she becomes a nuisance to them. Fed up with Dumpling's interferences, the pups decide to set up a test for her in hopes of discouraging her from hanging out with them again.
53	40	"Coup De Vil"	Peter Ferk	Ken Koonce & Michael Merton	Otis Brayboy, David Concepcion, Maurice Fontenot & Kevin Lofton	January 19, 1998	DL-54 4338-103	DL-53 DL-41
Cruella invites Roger and Anita to her family reunion, but it's really a diversion so that she can destroy their farm and take over their property.
54	41	"Every Little Crooked Nanny" (Note: Working title: "The Conehead")	Victor Cook	Bruce Talkington	Bob Logan	January 30, 1998	DL-55A 4338-101	DL-54 DL-38
54	41	"Cone Head"	Skip Jones	David Hemingson	Jon Hooper & Enrique May	January 30, 1998	DL-53A 4338-104	DL-54 DL-38
Thinking that Anita is doing business with royalty, Cruella tricks Nanny out of her work and takes her place disguised as Nanny's sister to see what she's really up to. The main pups try to expose Cruella. Lucky gets injured and is forced to wear a cone on his head. Lucky now has to put up with not just the humiliation of the cone but also the inconvenience it causes him.
55	42	"Channels"	Skip Jones	Bruce Shelly & Anne Baumgarten	Garrett Ho & Christopher Headrick	February 6, 1998	DL-61A 4338-111	DL-55 DL-43
55	42	"Un-Lucky"	Victor Cook	Bruce Shelly & Anne Baumgarten	Yi-Chih Chen	February 6, 1998	DL-48A 4338-094	DL-55 DL-43
When an episode of Thunderbolt is interrupted by a newsflash about a crime in downtown Grutely that Anita is involved in, the main pups venture out to rescue her. Meanwhile, the other farm residents fight over the TV to watch their favorite channels, but their shows keep getting interrupted by the same news story. Lucky notices the spots on his back that make up a horseshoe have disappeared. Now Lucky thinks he is a jinx without his lucky horseshoe and loses his confidence, discouraging his friends from involving him in anything that they do.
56	43	"The Making of..."	Ken Boyer	Jess Winfield	Joey Banaszkiewicz, Shawna Cha, Chris Rutkowski & Rebecca Shen	February 9, 1998	DL-51 4338-102	DL-56 DL-39
The characters present a behind-the-scenes mockumentary about the series.
57	44	"Best of Show"	Victor Cook	Don Gillies	Bob Onorato	February 11, 1998	DL-31A 4338-065	DL-57 DL-45
57	44	"Walk on the Wild Side"	Skip Jones	David Hemingson	Christopher Headrick & Linda Miller	February 11, 1998	DL-61B 4338-114	DL-57 DL-45
Roger and Anita enroll the main pups in a dog show, which Cruella involves her pet dog, Vandella, in too. Rolly is fed up with being a butt monkey, so he teams up with Swamp Rat to get revenge on the animals who pranked him. However, Rolly gets carried away and ends up stealing from innocent animals. Now he must find a way to give all the stuff back.
58	45	"Horace and Jasper's Big Career Move"	Ken Boyer	Bruce Shelly & Anne Baumgarten	Phil Mosness & Joe Suggs	February 13, 1998	DL-57 4338-107	DL-58 DL-47
Horace and Jasper have been fired by Cruella for the last time, so they go on a series of job interviews and talk about all the jobs they've had in the past in the form of flashbacks.
59	46	"De Vil-Age Elder"	Victor Cook	Don Gillies	Carin-Anne Anderson, Sean Bishop & Todd Britton	February 16, 1998	DL-62 4338-112	DL-59 DL-44
Roger, Anita and the main pups stumble across an old town that is being run by one of Cruella's ancestors. Little do they know, the town is cursed causing anyone who steps into it to fall in love with the place except for chickens and members of the De Vil family. Being immune to the curse, it's up to Spot to save everyone and get them out of the town before it disappears for the next century.
60	47	"Jurassic Bark"	Victor Cook	Sean Catherine Derek	Chris Rutkowski	February 20, 1998	DL-63B 4338-115	DL-60 DL-46
60	47	"My Fair Moochie"	Peter Ferk	Mirith J.S. Colao	Barking Bullfrog Cartoon Co.	February 20, 1998	DL-65A 4338-118	DL-60 DL-46
Lucky discovers a prehistoric dog frozen in an underground ice cavern. He and his friends unearth him and befriend him. However, Cruella and P.H. De Vil want the cave pup for their museum. The famous dog wrestler, El Diablo, is scheduled to pay a visit to Dearly Farm for a wrestling match with Mooch. Mooch and Cadpig wind up falling in love with each other distracting Mooch from preparing for his fight. Lucky, Rolly and Spot try to get Mooch prepared for his fight by trying to disguise their attempts as dating experiences for him and Cadpig, but Cadpig sees through their plots.
61	48	"Dog Food Day Afternoon"	Victor Cook	Regge Bulman & Clay Eide	Denise Koyama	February 23, 1998	DL-63A 4338-113	DL-61 DL-48
61	48	"Spot's Fairy God-Chicken"	Peter Ferk	Thomas Hart & Bruce Talkington	Barking Bullfrog Cartoon Co.	February 23, 1998	DL-64A 4338-116	DL-61 DL-48
Rolly finds out the recipe for Kanine Krunchies has changed. He discovers that a new manufacturing plant opened in Grutely without his knowledge, so he and the rest of the main pups visit the factory only to discover it's being run by Cruella who is using sawdust and chalk as the new kibble flavor. The pups must expose Cruella's scheme to try to get Kanine Krunchies back to its original flavor. Spot is desperate to be a Dalmatian like her friends. A Fairy God-Chicken grants her wish, but she soon realizes there are many advantages and disadvantages to being a dog.
62	49	"Good Neighbor Cruella" (Note: Working title: "The Good, The Bad and the Cruella")	Peter Ferk	Ken Koonce & Michael Merton	Liz Rathke Bakunovich & Otis Brayboy	February 27, 1998	DL-65B 4338-119	DL-62 DL-49
62	49	"Animal House Party"	Peter Ferk	Don Gillies	Liz Rathke Bakunovich & Otis Brayboy	February 27, 1998	DL-64B 4338-117	DL-62 DL-49
P.H. De Vil creates a cloning device that creates a good counterpart of Cruella. She comes to the Dearlys' home and chooses to serve as their maid, but her good deeds drive everyone crazy. Roger, Anita, Pongo and Perdita leave for a while leaving the main pups in charge of the house. While they're away, Cadpig comes down with P.D.S. and has to suffer through it. At the same time, Swamp Rat and all his friends from the swamp invade the Dearlys' house and throw a wild party. The pups have to put up with all the chaos and bring everything back in order.
63	50	"Dalmatian Vacation"	Peter Ferk	Ken Koonce & Michael Merton	David O'Day & Barking Bullfrog Cartoon Co.	March 2, 1998	DL-58 4338-108	DL-63 DL-50
64	51	"Dalmatian Vacation"	Peter Ferk	Thomas Hart	David Concepcion & Liz Rathke Bakunovich	March 3, 1998	DL-59 4338-109	DL-64 DL-51
65	52	"Dalmatian Vacation"	Peter Ferk	Jess Winfield	Norma Rivera, Jason So & Victor E. Glasko	March 4, 1998	DL-60 4338-110	DL-65 DL-52
Part 1 — "Road Warriors": Roger and Anita go on a spring vacation and bring all their Dalmatians with them. However, Cruella comes along too stating that she would only allow Anita to take time off if Cruella went with them on their honeymoon. Cruella and the pups don't agree on the stops they make. One of the Dearlys' destinations is the church where Roger and Anita got married, so that they can renew their wedding vows, but they soon find out they are not legally married and decide to get married for real, which opens a door for another one of Cruella's schemes. Part 2 — "Cross-Country Calamity": While still on their vacation, Cruella tries various schemes to get Anita to break up with Roger. Her attempts fail until she finally sets things up to look like Roger signed up to join a baseball team in Venezuela causing Anita to ditch him for good. Part 3 — "Dearly Beloved": While still on their vacation, the pups work together to try to get Roger and Anita back together. Cadpig takes care of Anita while Lucky, Rolly and the rest of the pups try to get Roger to the church. Can they make it to the church on time before it's too late?
