= Mary Patrick =

Mary Patrick may refer to:

- Mary Mills Patrick (1850-1940), American college president and author
- Sister Mary Patrick, name in religion of Lady Frances Moloney (1873–1959), Irish co-founder of the Missionary Sisters of St. Columban
- Sister Mary Patrick, character in the 1992 film Sister Act and its spinoffs
