= Myles-Mills =

Myles-Mills is a surname. Notable people with the surname include:

- John Myles-Mills (born 1966), Ghanaian sprinter
- Leonard Myles-Mills (born 1973), Ghanaian sprinter and brother of John

== See also ==
- Mills (surname)
- Myles (given name)
- Myles (surname)
