= Koshie =

Koshie may refer to:

== People with the surname ==
- Leelamma Koshie (1923-1989), Indian engineer

== People with the given name ==
- Koshie Mills, Ghanaian television producer
