= Daniel Mills =

Dan, Daniel or Danny Mills may refer to:

- Daniel W. Mills (1838–1904), American politician
- Daniel Yarnton Mills (1849–1904), Scottish chess master
- Dan Mills (c. 1931–2011), American animator and layout artist
- Daniel Mills (biologist) (born 1966), English veterinarian and biologist
- Danny Mills (born 1977), English professional footballer
- Danny Mills (footballer, born 1975), English professional footballer
- Danny Mills (footballer, born 1991), English semi-profesional footballer
- Danny Mills (rugby league) (living), Jamaican professional rugby footballer
