= Anthony Mills (disambiguation) =

Anthony Mills was a cricketer.

Anthony or Tony Mills may also refer to:

- Tony Mills (physician) (born 1961), American physician
- Tony Mills (singer) (1962–2019), British rock singer

== See also ==
- Anthonies Mill, Missouri
