= Bobby Mills =

Bobby Mills may refer to:

- Bobby Mills (athlete) (1894–1964), British long-distance runner
- Bobby Mills (footballer, born 1955) (born 1955), English footballer
- Bobby Mills (Australian footballer) (1909–1978), Australian rules footballer

== See also ==
- Robert Mills (disambiguation)
