= William Mills =

William Mills may refer to:

== Politics ==
- William Mills (1750–1820), MP for St Ives 1790–96 and Coventry 1805–12
- William J. Mills (1849–1915), governor of the New Mexico Territory
- William George Mills (1859–1933), sheep breeder and politician in South Australia
- William Oswald Mills (1924–1973), American politician
- William Thomas Mills (1924–2011), merchant and politician in Ontario, Canada
- William Stratton Mills (born 1932), politician in Northern Ireland
- William Mills (Lord Provost) (1776–1857), Scottish cotton merchant and lord provost of Glasgow
- William Ellison Mills (1859–1930), American leather manufacturer and politician from New York
- William Fitz Randolph Mills (1856–1941), mayor of Denver, Colorado

== Sports ==
- William Mills (English cricketer) (1820–1877), English lawyer and cricketer
- William Mills (New Zealand cricketer) (1875–1962), New Zealand cricketer
- William Mills (rugby union), English international rugby union player
- Willie Mills (baseball) (1877–1933), American professional baseball pitcher
- Billy Mills (footballer) (1891–19???), English professional footballer
- Billy Mills (racing driver) (1898–1937), South African racing driver
- Willie Mills (1915–1991), Scottish professional footballer
- Bill Mills (baseball) (1919–2019), Major League Baseball player
- Billy Mills (born 1938), American Olympic athlete

== Others ==
- William Mills (actor) (1701–1750), British stage actor
- William Augustus Mills (1777–1844), American major general in the War of 1812
- William Mills (surveyor) (1844–1916), Australian surveyor
- William Mills (bishop) (1846–1917), Canadian Anglican bishop of Ontario
- William Mills (inventor) (1856–1932), inventor of the Mills bomb
- William Corless Mills (1860–1928), American museum curator
- William Mills (businessman) (1866–1916), Western Australian businessman
- William Hobson Mills (1873–1959), British organic chemist
- William Harold Mills (1921–2007), American mathematician
- Billy G. Mills (born 1929), Los Angeles Superior Court judge and City Council member
- Billy Mills (poet) (born 1954), Irish poet
- Robert William Mills (1777–1851), English politician
- William Hemingway Mills (1834–1918), British civil engineer
