= Judge Mills =

Judge Mills may refer to:

- Michael P. Mills (born 1956), judge of the United States District Court for the Northern District of Mississippi
- Richard Henry Mills (1929–2023), judge of the United States District Court for the Central District of Illinois

== See also ==
- Justice Mills (disambiguation)
