= Ernie Mills (disambiguation) =

Ernie Mills (born 1968) is a retired American football player, now a coach.

Ernie Mills may also refer to:

- Ernie Mills (rugby league) (1904–1983), Australian rugby league player
- Ernie Mills (cyclist) (1913–1972), British amateur cycling champion
- Ernie Mills (decoy maker) (1934–2026), American duck decoy maker
- Ernie Mills (Coronation Street), a fictional character in the British TV soap opera Coronation Street in 1966 and 1967
