= Richard Mills =

Richard Mills may refer to:

- Richard Mills (composer) (born 1949), Australian composer and conductor
- Richard Charles Mills (1886–1952), Australian economist and academic
- Richard Henry Mills (1929–2023), U.S. federal judge
- Richard Mills (cricketer) (1798–1882), English cricketer
- Richard M. Mills Jr. (born 1959), U.S. diplomat and ambassador to Armenia as of 2015
- Richard P. Mills (educator) (1944–2017), American educator
- Richard P. Mills (general) (born 1950), United States Marine Corps general
- Rick Mills (born 1957), American glass artist
- Dick Mills (1945–2015), Major League Baseball pitcher
- Dick Mills (American football) (born 1939), NFL offensive guard

== See also ==
- Richard Milles (c. 1735–1820), MP for Canterbury
