= James Mills =

James, Jim, or Jimmy Mills may refer to:

== Arts and entertainment ==
- James Mills (author) (1932-2011), American novelist, screenwriter and journalist
- Jim Mills (banjo player) (1966–2024), American bluegrass banjo player
- James Edward Mills, African American author

== Law and politics ==
- James Mills (ship owner) (1847–1936), New Zealand businessman and politician
- James Mills (Manitoba politician) (1914–1997), Canadian politician
- James R. Mills (1927–2021), American politician in California

== Science and medicine ==
- James Philip Mills (1890–1960), English ethnographer
- James L. Mills (born 1947), American epidemiologist
- James O. Mills, American Egyptologist

== Sports ==
- Jimmy Mills (1894–1990), Scottish-American soccer player
- James P. Mills (1909–1987), American polo player
- Jim Mills (rugby) (born 1944), Welsh rugby union and rugby league footballer
- Jim Mills (gridiron football) (born 1961), Canadian-American football player

== Others ==
- James Henry Mills (1923–1973), American Medal of Honor recipient

== See also ==
- James Mill (1773–1836), Scottish historian and economist
