= Charles Mills =

Charles, Charlie or Chuck Mills may refer to:

== Academics and scholars ==
- C. Wright Mills (Charles Wright Mills) (1916–1962), American academic sociologist
- Charles Henry Mills (1873–1937), English-American classical composer and academic
- Charles W. Mills (1951–2021), Jamaican-American academic philosopher
- Charles Karsner Mills, (1845–1931), American academic neurologist
- Charles Mills (historian) (1788–1826), English historian

== Artists and musicians ==
- Charles Mills (artist, born 1920) (1920–2009), African-American artist
- Charles Mills (Massachusetts artist) (1856–1956), American artist
- Charlie Mills (animator) (born 1954), British animator
- Charles Mills (composer) (1914–1982), American composer

== Sportspeople ==
- Charles Mills (English cricketer) (1816–?), English cricketer
- Charles Mills (South African cricketer) (1867–1948), South African cricketer and coach
- Charlie Mills (baseball) (1844–1874), American professional baseball player
- Charlie Mills (harness racer) (1888–1972), German horse racer and trainer
- Chuck Mills (1928–2021), American college football coach

== Business and industry ==
- Sir Charles Mills, 1st Baronet (1792–1872), British banker and member of the Council of India
- Charles Karsner Mills (1845–1930), American physician and neurologist
- Charles E. Mills (1867-1929), American businessman and banker
- Charles N. Mills (born 1961), American businessman

== Military figures ==
- Charles Mills (Medal of Honor) (1840–?), American Civil War Medal of Honor recipient
- Charles Mills (Royal Navy officer) (1914–2006), Royal Navy officer, KCB, CBE, DSC

== Politicians ==
- Charles Mills (1755–1826), British politician and East India Company director
- Charles Mills, 1st Baron Hillingdon (1830–1898), British banker and politician
- Charles Mills, 2nd Baron Hillingdon (1855–1919), British banker and politician
- Charlie Mills (politician) (1843–1923), New Zealand politician
- Charles Henry Mills (Canadian politician) (1861–1927), Canadian businessman and politician
- Charles Mills (Uxbridge MP) (1887–1915), British politician and WWI officer

== Other ==
- Charles Mills (1810 ship), United Kingdom-flagged ocean trade ship (1810-1822)
