= Arthur Mills =

Arthur Mills may refer to:

- Arthur Mills (footballer, born 1906) (1906–?), English professional footballer
- Arthur Mills (Australian footballer) (1905–1984), Australian rules footballer
- Arthur Mills (MP) (1816–1898), British politician
- Arthur Mills, 3rd Baron Hillingdon (1891–1952), British peer and politician
- Arthur F. H. Mills (1887–1955), English novelist
- Arthur Wallis Mills (1878–1940), British artist
- Arthur Mills (Indian Army officer) (1879–1964), general in the British Indian Army
- Arthur Mills (cricketer) (1923–2001), New Zealand cricketer

== See also ==
- Art Mills (1903–1975), American baseball player and coach
- A. J. Mills (songwriter) (Arthur John Mills, 1872–1919), English lyricist of music hall songs
- Arthur Mills Lea (1868–1932), Australian entomologist
- Arthur Mill, a copper smelting mill in Magna, Utah
