= Joshua Mills =

Joshua or Josh Mills may refer to:

- Joshua Mills (Australian politician) (1859–1943), MP in Western Australia
- Joshua Mills (mayor) (1797–1843), mayor of Cleveland, Ohio
- Josh Mills, American actor in Hobgoblins 2
