= Miriam Mills =

Public administration scholar and political scientist

Miriam Kosiner Mills
- Born: May 22, 1938; Leipzig, Germany
- Died: March 13, 1992 (aged 53)
- Education: City College of New York; New York University
- Scientific career
- Fields: Political science
- Workplaces: New Jersey Institute of Technology

Miriam Kosiner Mills (née Kosiner, May 22, 1938 – March 13, 1992) was a scholar of public administration and political science. She was a professor of public administration at the New Jersey Institute of Technology, where in 1992 she held an Endowed Chair in Public Management. Her research focused on health policy and public administration in developing countries.

== Life and career ==
Mills was born on May 22, 1938, in Leipzig, Germany. On August 31, 1939, Mills and her family were on the final train to leave Germany for France before the beginning of World War II. She lived for the next several years in England, before moving to the United States in 1945.

Mills attended the City College of New York, studying health care administration, and she worked in that field until 1978. She then attended graduate school at New York University, obtaining a master's degree and then a PhD in public administration. After completing her PhD she became a professor of public administration at the New Jersey Institute of Technology, where she remained until her death in 1992. In 1992 she was named to a newly created Endowed Chair in Public Management, which was named for her.

Mills's research was largely concerned with health policy, decision-making, and public administration in developing countries. She was an author or editor of 17 books during her lifetime. In addition to substantial work on health policy and health care administration, Mills's publications included books on public policy in China (Public Policy, Public Administration, and the People's Republic of China in 1992), policy analysis in developing countries (Developing Nations and Super-Optimum Policy Analysis 1993), and dispute resolution (Alternative dispute resolution in the public sector 1991).

In addition to her academic publications, Mills published a book in 1991 about living with cancer called The Penny Diary: Countering Illness. She also wrote a poetry collection, The kites of hope, published in 1966.

Mills died on March 13, 1992. She has been the namesake for multiple awards. The Miriam K. Mills Endowed Chair in Public Management was created by the trustees of the New Jersey Institute of Technology in 1992, and Mills herself held that chair shortly before her death. Mills was also the namesake of the annual Best Book Award given by the Urban Politics Section of the American Political Science Association, called the Miriam Mills Award. The Policy Studies Organization also awarded a Miriam K. Mills Award, given for contributions to the field of policy studies. As well, following her death, the University of Illinois hosted a Miriam K. Mills Research Center for Super-Optimizing Analysis and Developing Nations.

== Selected works ==
Mills's work includes the following books:

- The Kites of Hope (1966)
- The Penny Diary: Countering Illness (1991)
- Alternative Dispute Resolution in the Public Sector (1991)
- Health Insurance and Public Policy (1992)
- Public Administration in China, edited with Stuart S. Nagel (1993)
