= Frederick Mills =

Frederick Mills may refer to:

- Sir Frederick Mills, 1st Baronet (1865–1953), English iron and steel manufacturer and politician
- Frederick Mills (engineer) (1898–1949), Chief Mechanical Engineer of the Western Australian Government Railways
- Frederick Mills (cricketer) (1898–1929), English cricketer
- Frederick Mills (rugby union) (1849–1904), English rugby union player
- Frederick C. Mills (1892–1964), American economist
- Fred Mills (footballer) (1910–1944), English footballer
- Freddie Mills (1919–1965), English boxer
- Fred Mills (musician) (1935–2009), Canadian trumpeter
- Fred Mills (politician) (born 1955), Louisiana politician
- Fred Mills (American journalist)
