= Frank Mills =

Frank Mills may refer to:

- Frank Mills (pianist) (born 1942), Canadian pianist
- Frank Mills (American actor) (1891–1973), American film and television actor
- Frank R. Mills (1868–1921), American stage and silent film actor
- Frank Mills (baseball) (1895–1983), American baseball catcher
- Frank Mills (British actor) (1927–2021), British actor
- Sir Frank Mills (diplomat) (1923–2006), British diplomat
- Frank Mills (surgeon) (1910–2008), Australian heart surgeon
- Frank Mills (politician) (1904–1969), member of the Ohio House of Representatives
- Frank Mills (rugby union) (1873–1925), Wales national rugby union player
- "Frank Mills", a song from the musical Hair
