= Danny Mills (footballer, born 1975) =

English professional footballer (born 1975)

Personal information
- Date of birth: 13 February 1975 (age 51)
- Place of birth: Sidcup, England
- Position: Midfielder

Senior career*
Years	Team	Apps	(Gls)
1993–1995	Charlton Athletic	5	(0)
1995–1998	Barnet	39	(0)
1998–1999	Brighton & Hove Albion	7	(0)
Total		51	(0)
- * Club domestic league appearances and goals

Daniel Raymond Mills (born 13 February 1975) is an English former professional footballer who played in the Football League as a midfielder.
