= Travis Mills (soldier) =

Retired U.S. Army soldier, combat quadruple amputee (born 1987)

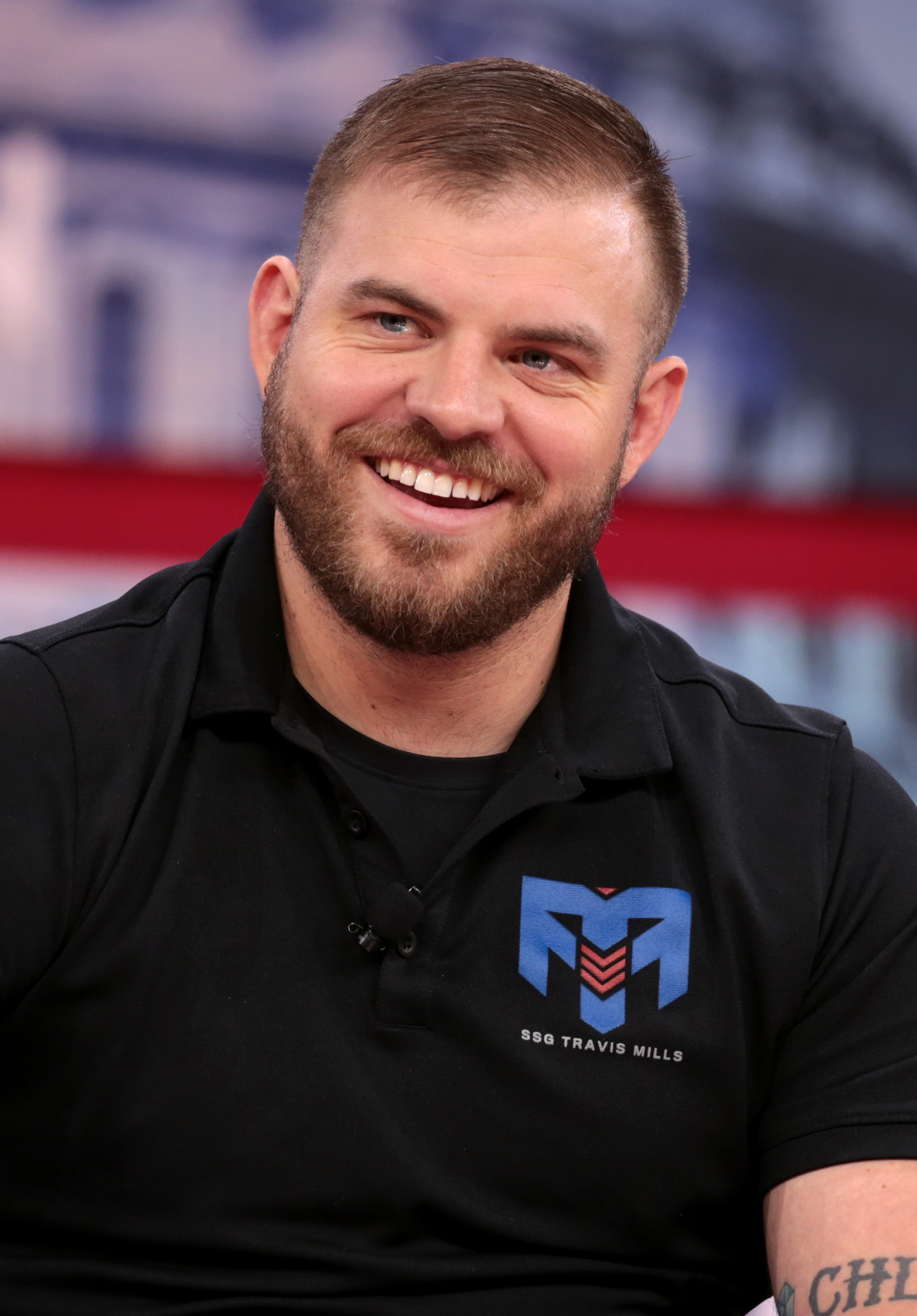

Personal details
- Born: Travis Fieldyen Mills; April 14, 1987 (age 39) Vassar, Michigan, U.S.
- Party: Republican

Travis Fieldyen Mills (born April 14, 1987) is a retired United States Army soldier who became a quadruple amputee while serving in Afghanistan. He speaks across the country, motivating others to live by his motto: "Never give up. Never quit." He has also established a foundation to build a retreat for other special-needs veterans injured in combat, and their families.

== Early life ==
Mills grew up in Vassar, Michigan, United States. After graduating from high school, he joined the United States Army and was assigned to the 82nd Airborne Division, where he rose to the rank of staff sergeant. During his three tours of duty in Afghanistan, Mills was awarded the Purple Heart and Bronze Star medals.

== Third tour in Afghanistan ==
On April 10, 2012, Mills was critically injured by an improvised explosive device (IED) on his third tour in Afghanistan, losing portions of both legs and both arms. He is one of only five quadruple amputees from the wars in Iraq and Afghanistan to survive such extensive injuries.

== Post-military career ==
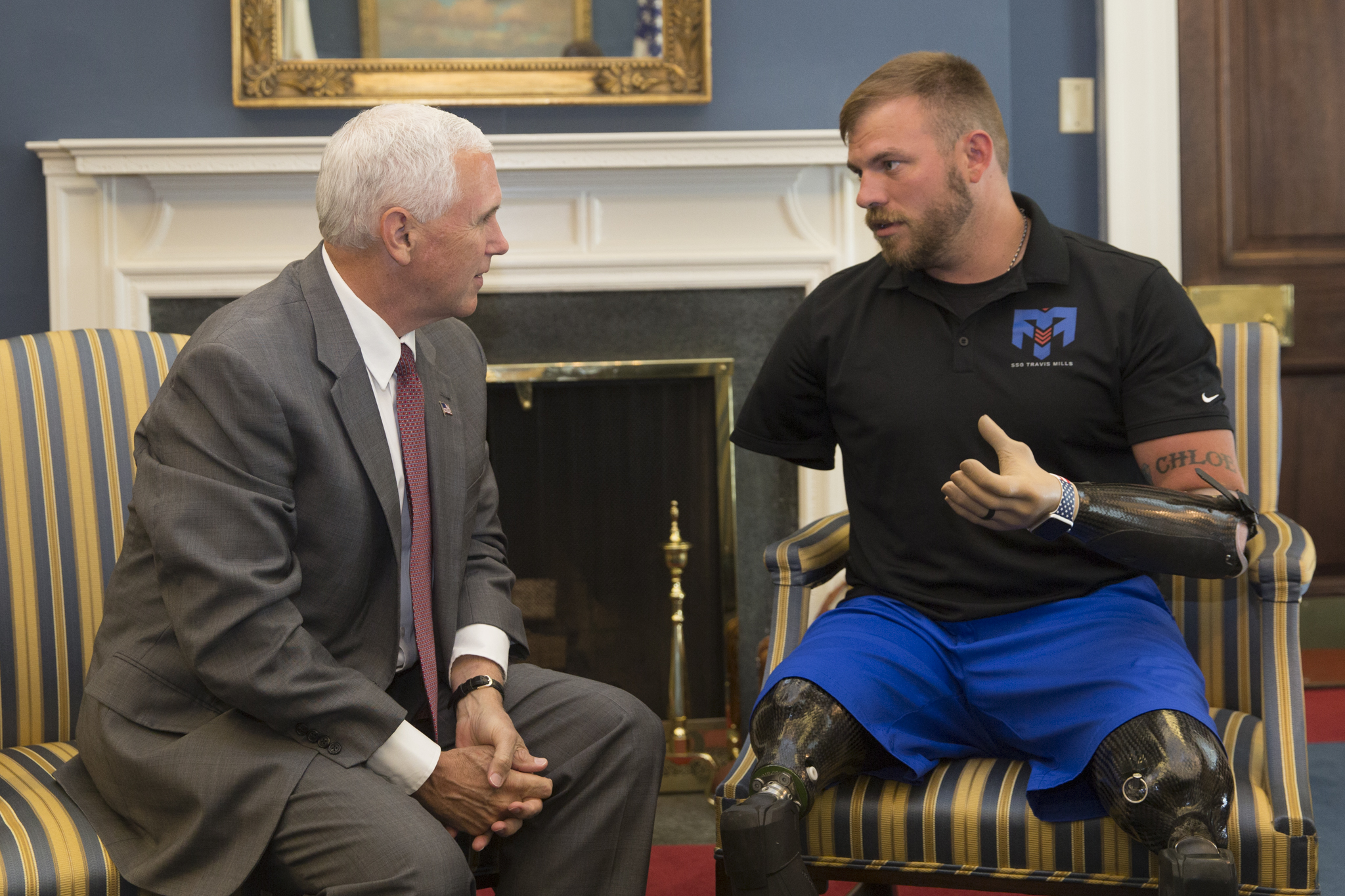
Mills and Vice President Mike Pence

Mills has written a New York Times bestselling memoir titled Tough As They Come. He was also the subject of a documentary film, Travis: A Soldier's Story.. He is the founder and President of the Travis Mills Foundation. The foundation raised $2.75 million in donations to rehabilitate Elizabeth Arden's Maine Chance Lodge, turning it into a fully accessible, free retreat for post 9/11 recalibrated veterans and their families. In the summer of 2017, the Veterans Retreat hosted over 56 combat-injured veterans. Travis also was featured in a 2022 documentary on HBO Max, titled "Hi I'm Travis Mills". In November of 2023, Travis published his second book titled Bounce Back, 12 Warrior Principles to Reclaim & Recalibrate Your Life. Travis is also a public speaker, traveling around the country speaking on behalf of his business, Travis Mills Group.

== Personal life ==
Mills currently resides in Maine with his wife Kelsey, his daughter Chloe, and his son Dax.
