= Gary Mills =

Gary Mills may refer to:

- Gary Mills (footballer, born 1961), English former football and manager
- Gary Mills (footballer, born 1981), English footballer

== See also ==
- Garry Mills (born 1941), British pop singer
