= Terry Mills =

Terry Mills may refer to:

- Terry Mills (basketball) (born 1967), American basketball player
- Terry Mills (American politician) (born 1950), Kentucky state legislator
- Terry Mills (Australian politician) (born 1957), Northern Territory politician
