= Sheldon Mills =

Welsh regulatory executive (born 1976)

Sheldon Mills (born 5 June 1976) is the executive director, consumers and competition at the Financial Conduct Authority. He had previously been a senior director at the Competition and Markets Authority and chair of the board of trustees of Stonewall.

== Early life and education ==
Mills was born on 5 June 1976 and grew up in Ely, Cardiff, Wales. At secondary school he decided to study law at university after looking through prospectuses in the school library. His school was generally supportive and discouragement by one teacher made him more determined. He studied law at King's College, London as both an undergraduate and postgraduate student, and he was only the second person from his school to go to university. He qualified as a solicitor.

== Career ==
He worked initially at the legal firms King & Wood Mallesons and Jones Day specialising in antitrust and competition law. He then joined the Competition and Markets Authority as senior director for mergers, and later in designing and implementing the new UK State Aid regime.

Mills moved to the Financial Conduct Authority in November 2018 as director of competition with responsibilities around competition in the financial industry and anti-competitive behaviour. He supported development of open banking systems for companies to share information about customers to provide more access to financial advice with the objective of increasing competition and innovation. He became interim executive director of strategy and competition and a member of the agency's executive committee in March 2020 In December 2020 he became the executive director, consumers and competition.

== Other roles ==
In January 2013, Mills joined the board of trustees of Stonewall, the largest British organisation claiming to support LGBT rights, and was involved in the decision of the charity to become a trans-inclusive organisation in 2015. He also supported Stonewall's partnership with UK Black Pride. In April 2020 he became the chair of the charity's board and its longest-standing trustee.
