= Benjamin Fay Mills =

American clergyman and writer

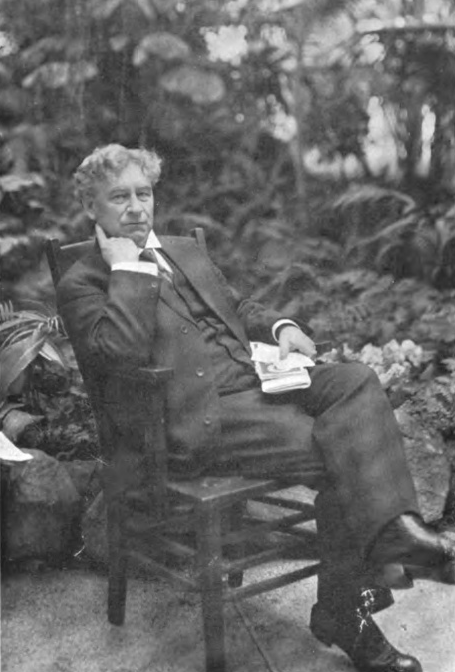
- Born: June 4, 1857; Rahway, New Jersey, U.S.
- Died: May 1, 1916 (aged 58); Grand Rapids, Michigan, U.S.
- Education: Lake Forest University (B.A., 1879; M.A., 1881)
- Occupations: Preacher, writer
- Spouse: Mary Russell (m. 1879)
- Children: 6

Benjamin Fay Mills (June 4, 1857 – May 1, 1916) was an American evangelist, a Unitarian pastor, and a lecturer who supported religious liberalism.

== Biography ==
Mills was born at Rahway, New Jersey in 1857. His father, Thornton A. Mills (1810-1867), son of Kentucky judge Benjamin Mills, was a Presbyterian minister; and his mother, Anna Whittelsey Mills (1820-1891), had been a missionary to Ceylon. After attending Andover Academy, Hamilton College, Wooster University and Carlton College, Mills earned his B.A. from Lake Forest University in 1879 and an M.A. in 1881. There he met future evangelist and lifelong friend J. Wilbur Chapman.

In 1879, Mills married Mary Russell in 1879, and they had six children, all born before he abandoned Protestant orthodoxy. After two brief pastorates in South Dakota and Greenwich, New York, Mills was called to the Congregational church at Rutland, Vermont, which experienced a revival under his leadership. After this success, he eventually determined to become a full-time evangelist. During the next ten years, he preached to approximately five million people and recorded 200,000 conversions. As was typical for the period, Mills held union campaigns with the support of cooperating pastors of many denominations, promoted attendance by organizing delegations from various community clubs and work places, and held special services for women and young people. Mills possessed a gift for storytelling, had a charismatic personality, exuded personal charm, and repeatedly exercised "a genius for organization." Though he briefly maintained membership in both the Congregational and Presbyterian churches--both Calvinistic denominations--Mill's own theology was decidedly Arminian. Following a successful campaign in Cincinnati in 1892, Mills was invited to campaign in other large American cities, including Omaha, Minneapolis, San Francisco, Milwaukee, Buffalo, Nashville, and Montreal.

Mills had earlier developed a social conscience, but by 1893, influenced by Christian socialist George D. Herron at Iowa College, Mills began to add the teachings of the Social Gospel to his evangelistic preaching, notably in 1895 in Columbus, Ohio with the support of Washington Gladden, the pastor of First Congregational Church and a leader in the Social Gospel movement. Mills had already jettisoned a number of orthodox Protestant doctrines, including eternal torment, "expiatory atonement," the plenary inspiration of the Bible, and salvation through Christ alone. Mills said that by the time he was thirty-five, he had concluded that Christ's call to men was "to try to make earth into heaven while they lived," the Kingdom of God on earth. Mills studied the Upanishads and the Bhagavad Gita and was strongly influenced by his reading of Walt Whitman and Ralph Waldo Emerson. Mills' new-found idealism extended to the belief that the American Civil War could not be justified because the North had resorted to violence when "slaves could have been set free by peace.”

In 1897, Mills became Stated Supply for the Fourth Presbyterian Church of Albany, New York, where he encouraged the church to open a Welcome Hall across the street, a shelter and workhouse for the unemployed. This program being controversial, he left the pastorate and attempted to continue his evangelistic ministry; but the attempt to unite revivalism with social reform proved abortive. Even Washington Gladden regretted the "new departure of Mr. Mills" when Mills decided to organize his own church at the Boston Music Hall, nominally independent, though effectively Unitarian in sympathy. From 1897 to 1899, Mills was the most often quoted minister in Boston newspapers. By this time, Mills denied the existence of angels, the preexistence of Christ, and the promise of a life beyond death.

After two years, Mills left Boston to become minister of the First Unitarian Church of Oakland, Oakland, California, where he attracted many new members and erased a significant mortgage on the building. Mills insisted that the church be without creed and focus on broad social and religious topics, such as "Our Relations with China" and "The Religion of the Great Poets." But he also tried to inject some quasi-revivalism by instituting church greeters and encouraging friendship evangelism to attract new members. He also instituted a Relief Society and sought to cultivate concern for the needy throughout the world. During this period, Mills was attracted by the teachings of Swami Vivekananda and invited him to give a series of lectures at the church.

Growing restive within Unitarianism, Mills organized another church, the Los Angeles Fellowship, in 1905. In this church, he established committees to promote work in jails and hospitals, as well as a legal aid bureau; and he created a monthly magazine, Fellowship, which published "ethical thought, simply expressed," including that of Clarence Darrow, an agnostic.

In 1908, Mills resigned, nominally in the interests of the work of the Greater Fellowship, the missionary arm of the Fellowship movement--largely a paper organization. After failing to establish himself again in the San Francisco area, in 1911, Mills started a Chicago branch of the Fellowship. There he held lectures on "Yoga Philosophy" and Walt Whitman--with special attention given to Leaves of Grass--and the ideas of New Thought writer Ralph Waldo Trine. In 1913, Mills moved to New York, gave similar lectures, then returned to Los Angeles, and back again to Chicago.

Finally, he shocked even his most ardent supporters in 1915, when he reconverted to evangelical Christianity, J. Wilbur Chapman preparing the way for his reintroduction to orthodox circles. Nevertheless, many evangelical clergymen remained skeptical. At one ministerial meeting, Mills deliberately recited the Nicene Creed; but he continued to express his current beliefs in Emersonian language.

Mills joined Wilbur Chapman in a series of meetings in New York, where he rehearsed his life story and declared that despite his study of world religions, "there was no book which supplied the spiritual needs of humanity like the Bible." Yet he was unable to make a satisfactory return to his earlier career of evangelism. He died of a stroke in Grand Rapids, Michigan on May 1, 1916. He was cremated, and his ashes were spread "in a favorite but unmarked spot outside the city."

== Selected publications ==
"Only a scattered few personal papers of Mills have been preserved. Death claimed the historically-minded member of the family, Ethelwyn Mills, in 1938, frustrating her plans to write a biography of her father. The materials she had preserved were lost. Another daughter presided over the destruction of Mills' sermon notes."

- Power From On High (1890)
- A Message to Mothers (1892)
- Victory Through Surrender (1892)
- God's World and Other Sermons (1893)
- The Ministry of the Nations to One Another (1895)
- Address of Rev. Benjamin Fay Mills (1897)
- Twentieth Century Religion (1898)
- Why I Am a Vegetarian (1903)
- A Strong Argument (1904)
- The Divine Adventure (1905)
- Why I Changed My Religious Opinions (1908)
- An Evangelist's Views on Health Building (1914)
- Why I Return to the Church (1915)
