= Roger Mills =

Roger Mills may refer to:

- Roger H. Mills (1813–1881), American politician and lawyer in Connecticut
- Roger Q. Mills (1832–1911), U.S. Representative and Senator from Texas
  - Roger Mills County, Oklahoma, named in his honor
- Roger Mills (badminton) (1942–2020), English badminton player
- Roger Mills (racewalker) (born 1948), British race walker
- Roger Mills (speedway rider) (born c. 1950), British speedway rider
- Roger W. Mills (born 1951), British economist
