= Verna Mills =

Diplomat from Saint Kitts and Nevis

Verna Mills, also known as Verna Morris-Mills, is a diplomat from Saint Kitts and Nevis. She is currently the country's ambassador to Cuba, the first woman to hold that role. She also serves as the non-resident ambassador to Ghana, South Africa, and Kenya.

== Biography ==
Mills was born in Basseterre, Saint Kitts, and grew up in Tabernacle. After attending primary and secondary school in Saint Kitts, she left in 1999 to study in Cuba, earning her bachelor's degree in philology from the University of Santiago de Cuba in 2005.

After returning to Saint Kitts later that year, she joined the Ministry of Foreign Affairs as a junior foreign service officer, working on the Latin America desk.

In 2013, she graduated with a master's degree in diplomacy and international relations from the Diplomatic School of Spain.

As a Foreign Service Officer, Mills helped establish Saint Kitts and Nevis' embassy in Havana in 2014. She was subsequently named as the chargé d'affaires at the embassy in May 2015, a role she held for two years.

In September 2017, she was appointed as ambassador to Cuba, becoming the first woman to hold this position and the youngest ambassador of Saint Kitts and Nevis at the time. She was only the second accredited resident ambassador in the history of the diplomatic relationship with Cuba.

In July 2019, Mills was named non-resident ambassador to Ghana and South Africa. Then, in December 2019, she was also appointed as the first non-resident high commissioner of Saint Kitts and Nevis to Kenya. She continues to be based in Cuba but serves as ambassador from her base there, in part via the countries' embassies in Havana themselves. She has been involved in diplomatic relations with various other countries via Havana, including Belarus.
