= Leila Mills =

American judge

Leila Mills (born 1959) was a Superior Court Judge in Kitsap County, Washington. She is best known as the jurist who presided in a nationally-publicized prosecution of a marijuana grower, which led to an acquittal under Washington's medical cannabis law.

First elected in 2000, Judge Mills was reelected three times. In 2001, she was instrumental in creating the Kitsap County Youth Court. Since that time, Judge Mills has coached students for the annual YMCA Mock Trial Competition and team-taught the Street Law Program at Central Kitsap High School.

In 2007, Washington State Supreme Court Chief Justice Gerry Alexander presented the Judge William Nevins Award to Judge Mills at the Fall Judicial Conference held in Vancouver, Washington. The Nevins Award was created by the Washington Judges Foundation to honor those members of the judiciary who display extraordinary dedication to the judicial branch of government. The Washington Judges Foundation gave the award to Judge Mills because of her consistent, long-term commitment to youth education and public understanding of the law and the role of the judiciary in American society.

Judge Mills retired from the bench in May 2018.
