= Keith Mills (footballer) =

English footballer

Personal information
- Full name: Keith David Mills
- Date of birth: 29 December 1942 (age 83)
- Place of birth: Egham, England
- Position: Right half

Senior career*
Years	Team	Apps	(Gls)
1960–1961	Grimsby Town	2	(0)
1961–1963	Wimbledon	3	(0)
1963–1964	Yiewsley		
- * Club domestic league appearances and goals

Keith David Mills (born 29 December 1942) is an English former professional footballer who played in the Football League as a right half.
