= Bobby Mills (Australian footballer) =

Australian rules footballer, born 1909

Personal information
- Full name: Bobby Mills
- Born: 28 August 1909
- Died: 9 September 1978 (aged 69)
- Original team: Koo-Wee-Rup
- Height: 185 cm (6 ft 1 in)
- Weight: 81 kg (179 lb)

Playing career^{1}
Years	Club	Games (Goals)
1929	Footscray	1 (0)
1934	Carlton	1 (0)
Total		2 (0)
- ^{1} Playing statistics correct to the end of 1934.

Bobby Mills (28 August 1909 – 9 September 1978) was an Australian rules footballer who played with Carlton and Footscray in the Victorian Football League (VFL).
