= Edwin Mills =

Edwin Mills may refer to:

- Edwin Mills (athlete) (1878–1946), British tug-of-war competitor
- Edwin Mills (cricketer) (1857–1899), English cricketer
- Edwin Mills (economist) (1928–2021), American economist
- Edwin Mills (actor), American actor in Return to the Planet of the Apes
