= Hugh Mills (politician) =

American politician

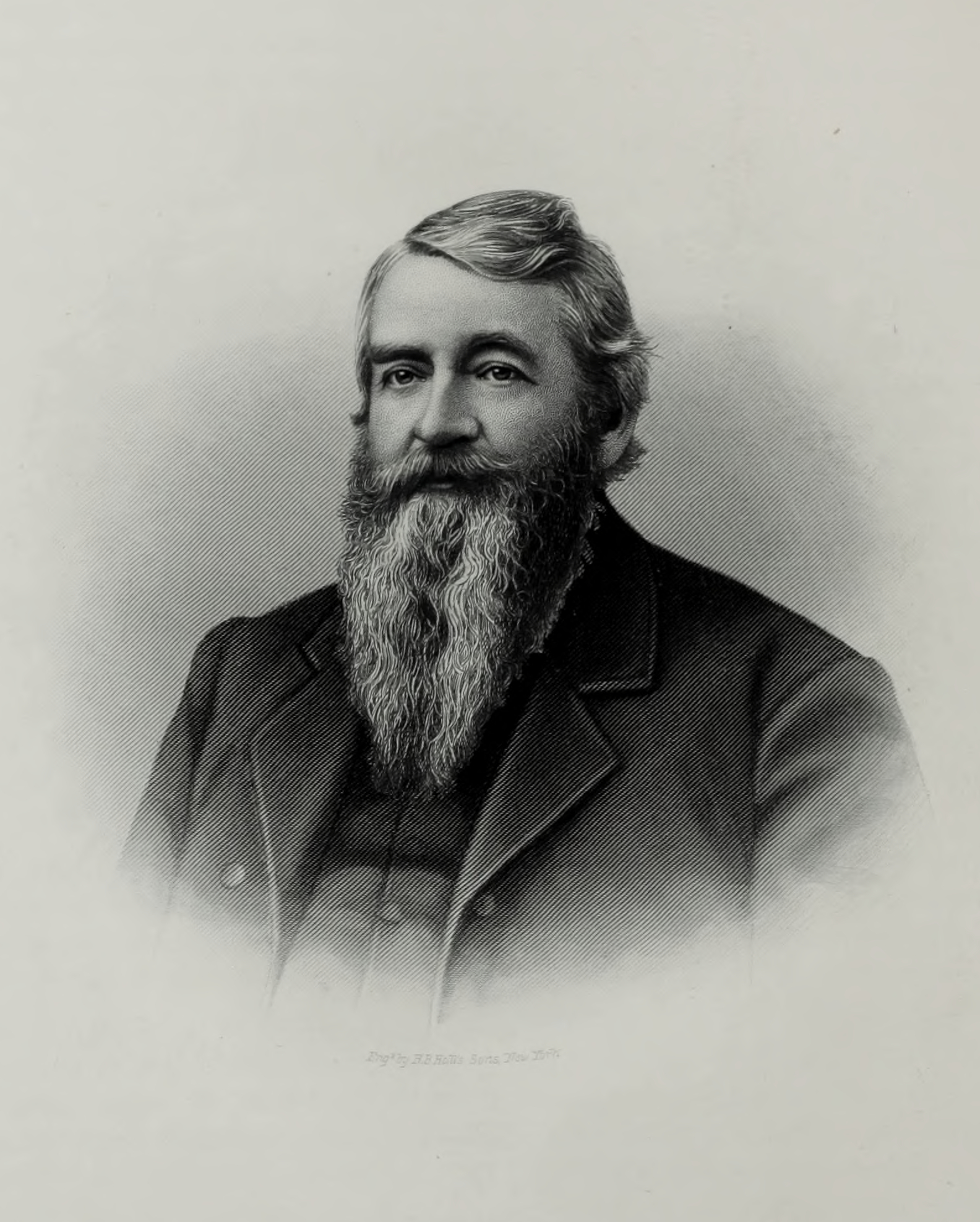
Hugh Brooks Mills

Hugh Brooks Mills (July 14, 1828 – February 28, 1901) was an American businessman and politician.

Born in what is now Canada, he moved with his parents to New York. In 1849, Mills moved to Wisconsin and eventually moved to Black River Falls, Wisconsin. He was in the lumber and hotel businesses and as an officer with the railroad and bank. He served as town treasurer and chairman of the town board. In 1876, he served in the Wisconsin State Assembly as a Republican. He died of a stroke in Black River Falls, Wisconsin.

== See also ==
- Betsy Thunder
