= Barry Mills =

Barry Mills may refer to:

- Barry Mills (college president) (born 1950), American academic administrator
- Barry Mills (Aryan Brotherhood) (1948–2018), American gangster and murderer
- Barry Mills (producer) (born 1965), American filmmaker

== See also ==
- Barry Mill, a watermill in Barry, Angus, Scotland
