= Samuel Mills =

Samuel Mills may refer to:

- Samuel Sylvester Mills (1806–1874), Canadian businessman and member of the Senate of Canada
- Samuel John Mills (1783–1818), American preacher who helped found the American Bible Society and the American Colonization Society
- Samuel Mills (footballer) (1871–?), English footballer
- Samuel C. Mills (1833–1911), produced the earliest surviving photographic record of the Oregon Trail and California Trail
- Samuel Meyers Mills Jr. (1842–1907), United States Army officer
- Samuel Atta Mills (born 1956), Ghanaian politician
- Samuel Mills, early settler after whom Millswood, South Australia is named

== See also ==
- Sam Mills (1959–2005), American football player
- Sam Mills III, his son, football coach
- Sam Mills (company), a Romanian and European food company
- Samuel Milles (died 1727), MP
