= Peter Mills =

Peter Mills may refer to:

- Peter Mills (1598–1670), English bricklayer and architect
- Peter Mills (American politician) (born 1943), American politician from Maine
- Peter Mills (British politician) (1921–1993), British Conservative politician
- Peter Mills (1927–1988), pretender to the Byzantine throne
- Peter Mills (badminton) (born 1988), English badminton player
- Peter Mills (Chicago Fire), a fictional character from the TV series Chicago Fire
- Peter Mills (composer), composer of musicals
- Peter Mills (field hockey) (born 1945), British Olympic hockey player
- Peter Mills (golfer) (born 1931), English golfer
- Peter Mills (RAF officer) (born 1955), Church of Scotland minister and former head of the RAF Chaplains Branch
- Peter Mills (cricketer) (born 1958), English cricketer
- Peter Mills (freedman) (1861–1972), allegedly the last known surviving American slave
- S. Peter Mills Jr. (1911–2001), American attorney and politician from Maine

== See also ==
- Pete Mills (Sullivan Mills Jr., 1942–2015), American football player
