= Jade Mills =

American real estate agent

- Occupation: Real estate broker
- Children: 4

Jade Mills is an American real estate agent, president of Jade Mills Estates, and the International Ambassador for Coldwell Banker Global Luxury. In 2024, Mills was ranked the #1 individual in the Western Region for Coldwell Banker Realty, with over $9 billion in career sales. Mills' clients include Hollywood celebrities like Britney Spears, Jennifer Aniston, Charlie Sheen, and Sela Ward.

== Career ==
Mills' first sale was a home for $42,000 in Van Nuys. She has appeared on Bloomberg TV and Fox News as a real estate expert. She serves as a board member for the Beverly Hills Chamber of Commerce and on the Board of Governors at Cedars Sinai Hospital.

== Personal life ==
Mills is the daughter of a dairy farmer from Alamo, California. She has been married three times. As of 2019, she has four children and seven grandchildren.
