= Michael Mills =

Michael Mills may refer to:

- Michael Mills (journalist) (1927–2008), Irish ombudsman and journalist
- Michael Mills (English cricketer) (1921–2014), English cricketer
- Michael Mills (West Indian cricketer) (born 1967), West Indian cricketer
- Michael Mills (make-up artist), makeup artist
- Michael Mills (Canadian producer) (born 1942), Canadian short film director
- Michael Mills (British producer) (1919–1988), British television comedy producer
- Michael P. Mills (born 1956), U.S. federal judge
- Mick Mills (born 1949), English footballer
- Mike Mills (born 1958), R.E.M. bass guitarist
- Mike Mills (director) (born 1966), American film and music video director
- "Mike Mills", a song by Air from the 2004 album Talkie Walkie
