= Ernie Mills (decoy maker) =

American decoy maker (1934–2026)

Ernest Leon Mills Jr. (April 2, 1934 – March 9, 2026) was an American third-generation duck decoy maker. He made Lower Chesapeake-style decoys. Nationally recognized as a folk artist, his traditional working decoys can be found in private collections and museums, including the Smithsonian Institution.

== Life and career ==
In 1980, Ernie Mills was commissioned by Ducks Unlimited to make decoys for their fund raising events and auctions. His reputation as a decoy maker grew, and he was awarded a Ducks Unlimited Life Sponsor award in 1985.

Mills made traditional working decoys, using techniques that he had been taught by his father and grandfather. He was recognized as one of the few extant decoy makers that still used a hatchet.

The May/June 2010 issue of Decoy Magazine called Mills "one of the most collectible working decoy makers on the East Coast".

Mills died on March 9, 2026, at the age of 91. He and his wife of 72 years, Jeannette, had three children.

== Awards ==
1993: A selection of Ernie Mills's decoys and tools are placed on permanent exhibit at the Atlanta History Center's "Shaping Traditions: Folk Arts in a Changing South".

1996: One of twelve traditional folk artists selected by the Smithsonian Institution to demonstrate decoy making at the 1996 Atlanta Olympic Games. Two of Ernie Mills's decoys are now in the Smithsonian Institution.

2010: Nominated for 2011 National Endowment for the Arts "National Heritage Fellowship", which is the Nation's Highest Honor in the Folk and Traditional Arts.
