= Walter Mills =

Walter Mills may refer to:

- Walter Mills (VC) (1894–1917), English recipient of the Victoria Cross
- Walter Mills (cricketer) (1852–1902), English cricketer
- Walter Edward Mills (1850–1910), English architect
- Walter Thomas Mills (1856–1942), American socialist activist, educator and newspaper publisher
