= Ron Mills =

Australian rules footballer

Personal information
- Full name: Ron Mills
- Born: 9 March 1938
- Died: 23 August 2015 (aged 77)
- Original team: Brunswick City
- Height: 179 cm (5 ft 10 in)
- Weight: 74 kg (163 lb)

Playing career^{1}
Years	Club	Games (Goals)
1959–60	North Melbourne	8 (0)
- ^{1} Playing statistics correct to the end of 1960.

Ron Mills (9 March 1938 – 23 August 2015) was an Australian rules footballer who played with North Melbourne in the Victorian Football League (VFL).
