= Percy Mills =

Percy Mills may refer to:

- Percy Mills, 1st Viscount Mills (1890–1968), English politician
- Percy Mills (cricketer) (1879–1950), English cricketer
- Percy Mills (footballer) (1909–1967), English footballer
- Percy Mills (weightlifter) (1896–1971), British weightlifter
