= Justice Mills =

Justice Mills may refer to:

- John T. Mills (1817–1871), associate justice of the Supreme Court of the Republic of Texas
- Michael P. Mills (born 1956), associate justice of the Mississippi Supreme Court
- William J. Mills (1849–1915), chief justice of the New Mexico Territorial Supreme Court

== See also ==
- The Battle of Justice Mills (1644)
- Judge Mills (disambiguation)
