= James L. Mills =

American epidemiologist (born 1947)

- Born: November 7, 1947 (age 78); New York City, New York
- Education: Cornell University; Children's Hospital of Philadelphia
- Known for: Research on birth defects
- Spouse: Gayle Linda Countryman (m. 1974)
- Scientific career
- Fields: Epidemiology
- Institutions: Eunice Kennedy Shriver National Institute of Child Health and Human Development

James Louis Mills (born November 7, 1947) is an American epidemiologist and Senior Investigator in the Epidemiology Branch of the Division of Intramural Population Health Research in the Eunice Kennedy Shriver National Institute of Child Health and Human Development. He has studied the effects of iodine and folic acid consumption on outcomes such as female fertility and the risk of birth defects.
