= Tommy Mills (footballer) =

Welsh association football player (born 1911)

Personal information
- Date of birth: 28 December 1911
- Place of birth: Ton Pentre, Wales
- Height: 5 ft 6 1/2 in (1.69 m)
- Position: Inside right

Senior career*
Years	Team	Apps	(Gls)
1936–1939	Bristol Rovers	99	(17)

International career
1933–1934	Wales	4	(1)
- * Club domestic league appearances and goals

Tommy Mills (28 December 1911; date of death unknown) was a Welsh international football forward. He was part of the Wales national football team between 1933 and 1934, playing 4 matches. He played his first match on 4 November 1933 against Ireland and his last match on 21 November 1934 against Scotland. At club level he played for Bristol Rovers F.C. between 1936 and 1939, playing 99 matches and scoring 17 goals.

== See also ==
- List of Wales international footballers (alphabetical)
