= Willie Mills (baseball) =

American baseball player

- Pitcher
- Born: August 15, 1877; Schenevus, New York, U.S.
- Died: March 14, 1933 (aged 55); Utica, New York, U.S.
- Batted: Right Threw: Right

MLB debut
- July 13, 1901, for the New York Giants

Last MLB appearance
- July 17, 1901, for the New York Giants

MLB statistics
- Win–loss record: 0–2
- Earned run average: 8.44
- Strikeouts: 3
- Stats at Baseball Reference

Teams
- New York Giants (1901)

William Grant Mills (August 15, 1877 – March 14, 1933), nicknamed Wee Willie, was an American professional baseball pitcher. He briefly pitched for the New York Giants in 1901.

Mills earned his nickname due to his stature; he stood only 5'7" and weighed about 150 lbs.

Mills played two years of college baseball at Oneonta Normal School. He first pitched professionally for Utica in the New York State League in 1899. He would post a 47-26 record with Utica over two seasons, leading the club to the 1900 New York State League championship. In 1901 he began the season with a 13-game winning streak while playing for Schenectady before being called up by the Giants. However, he would only make two appearances for the Giants, earning the loss in both games, before being returned to Schenectady.

During his career, he also pitched for Montreal, Los Angeles, Baltimore, Rochester, and Toronto.

Mills was the father of Art Mills, who played for the Boston Braves and also coached the Detroit Tigers in their 1945 World Series victory.
