= Anthony Mills =

English cricketer

Personal information
- Full name: Anthony Oliver Henry Mills
- Born: 12 February 1920; Sherston, Wiltshire, England
- Died: 22 May 1997 (aged 77); Hitchin, Hertfordshire, England
- Batting: Right-handed
- Bowling: Right arm medium pace
- Role: Bowler

Domestic team information
- Years: Team
- 1939–1948: Gloucestershire

Career statistics
Competition	FC
Matches	4
Runs scored	81
Batting average	16.20
100s/50s	0/0
Top score	39
Balls bowled	86
Wickets	3
Bowling average	20.66
5 wickets in innings	0
10 wickets in match	0
Best bowling	2/28
Catches/stumpings	1/0
- Source: Cricinfo, 3 August 2013

Anthony Mills (12 February 1920 – 22 May 1997) was an English cricketer. He played for Gloucestershire between 1939 and 1948.
