= Tom Mills =

Australian businessman

Tom Mills MC & Bar
- Born: 2 April 1908; Charters Towers, Queensland
- Died: 29 July 1978 (aged 70); Moreton Island, Queensland
- Military career
- Allegiance: Australia
- Branch: Australian Army
- Service years: 1939–1946
- Rank: Lieutenant Colonel
- Conflicts: World War II
- Awards: Military Cross & Bar

Thomas Mills (2 April 1908 – 29 July 1978) was an Australian soldier, tin miner and businessman. He served with distinction in World War II and was awarded the Military Cross and Bar.

== Early life ==
Tom Mills was born on 2 April 1908 at Charters Towers, Queensland. He was the son of a mining engineer, Thomas Mills, and Hettie Mary (née Millican). From 1919 Mills attended Newington College as a boarding student. He rowed in the 1st IV at the GPS Head of the River in 1924 and 1925 and played rugby union in the 1st XV in his final year at school, 1925. Following school, Mills undertook compulsory military training and spent time as a woolclasser. During the Depression he became a tinminer in Emmaville, New South Wales. In 1933, he joined the Militia and as a member of the 12th Light Horse Regiment he was commissioned as a lieutenant two years later.

== Marriage ==
Mills married Iris Irene O'Loan on 17 December 1939 in the Methodist Church at Crows Nest, New South Wales. They were married for twenty-three days before he left for war. The union later produced a daughter, named Wendy.

== World War II ==
In October 1939, Mills was appointed to the Second Australian Imperial Force and served with the 6th Divisional Reconnaissance Cavalry Regiment. At the Battle of Bardia in January 1941 he commanded three troops of Bren-gun carriers and was awarded the Military Cross for bravery in the field. During the invasion of Syria in June that year he was awarded a Bar to his Military Cross. Mills was the first of only fifteen Australian soldiers to hold that distinction in World War II. He was promoted to captain in June 1941 and major in February 1942 and in March 1943 was promoted to temporary lieutenant colonel and made commander of the 2/5th Armoured Regiment. In May 1944, Mills took command of the 2/4th Armoured Regiment and served in Madang, New Guinea. He relinquished command of the regiment in February 1946 and transferred to the Reserve of Officers on 27 March.

== Post-war life ==
Post-war Mills returned to the state of his birth and became involved in the pest-control business. His wife, daughter and granddaughter survived him when he died of myocardial infarction on 29 July 1978 at Ocean Beach, Moreton Island.
