= Mary Mills Patrick =

American college president and author

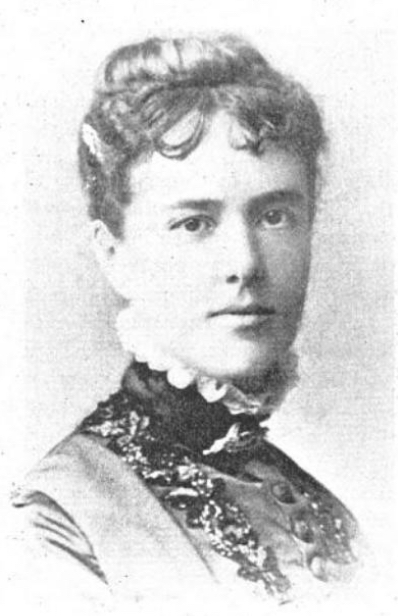
- Mary Mills Patrick, from an 1894 publication.
- Born: March 10, 1850; Canterbury, New Hampshire
- Died: February 25, 1940 (aged 89)

Mary Mills Patrick (March 10, 1850 Canterbury, New Hampshire – February 25, 1940) was a college president and author.

== Biography ==
Her family moved to Lyons, Iowa, (now part of Clinton) in 1865. There she studied at Lyons Collegiate Institute, where she graduated in 1869. In 1871, she became a teacher at an American school in Erzurum, Turkey. There she learned Armenian, ancient and modern. She left in 1875 to teach at an American high school in Üsküdar, outside of Istanbul. She became principal of the school (with Clara Hamlin) in 1883, becoming sole principal in 1889. She graduated from Iowa State University in 1890, immediately becoming head of the American College for Girls in Istanbul. The College was the old high school now chartered as a college by Massachusetts.

After two years, she spent her summers in different parts of Europe. She studied at the universities of Paris, Oxford, Heidelberg, Zurich, Leipzig, and Berlin, and received a Ph.D. at the University of Bern in 1897.

She was a member of the psychological congresses at Munich in 1896 and at Paris in 1900; and of the philosophical congresses at Paris, 1900, and at Bologne in 1911. She retired from the College in 1924 and moved to New York City. In 1932 she moved to Palo Alto, California.

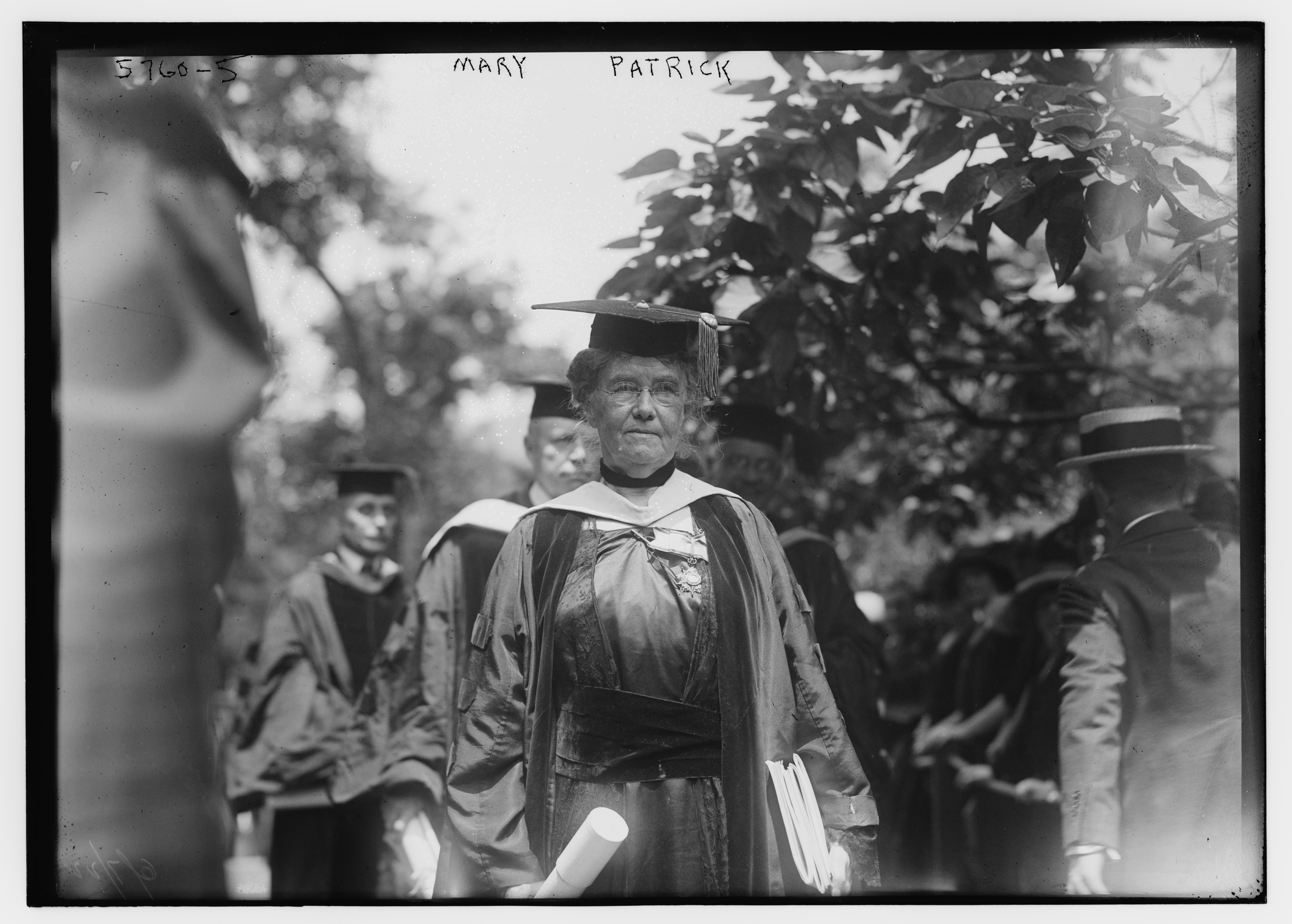
Mary Mills Patrick receiving an honorary PhD in 1922

== Works ==
- Armenian Translation of a Text-Book of Physiology, 1876
- Sextus Empiricus and Greek Skepticism, 1899 (Ph.D. dissertation)
- Sappho and the Island of Lesbos, 1912
- Under Five Sultans, 1929 (autobiography)
- The Greek Sceptics, 1929
- A Bosphorus Adventure, London, 1934 (history of Robert College)
