= Koshie Mills =

Naa Koshie Mills is a Ghanaian raised in the United Kingdom and living in the United States. She played a role in the "Year of Return", and is the host and executive producer of The Diaspora Dialogues, a television series about Africa and its diaspora.

She is married to Kwame Boakye, and has three sons who are Nana-Kofi Siriboe, Kwesi Boakye and Kwame Boateng.

== Career ==
Koshie Mills is an Executive Producer and host of The Diaspora Dialogues, and also the CEO of K3PR Marketing Agency.
