= Charlie Mills (baseball) =

American professional baseball player (1844–1874)

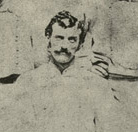
- Catcher
- Born: September 1844; Brooklyn, New York, U.S.
- Died: April 9, 1874 (aged 29); Brooklyn, New York, U.S.
- Batted: Unknown Threw: Unknown

MLB debut
- May 18, 1871, for the New York Mutuals

Last MLB appearance
- September 28, 1872, for the New York Mutuals

MLB statistics
- Batting average: .226
- Runs scored: 33
- Runs batted in: 24
- Stats at Baseball Reference

Teams
- National Association of Base Ball Players Brooklyn Eckfords (1865) Brooklyn Atlantics (1866–1868) New York Mutuals (1869–1870) National Association of Professional BBP New York Mutuals (1871–1872)

Charles F. Mills (September 1844 – April 9, 1874) was an American Major League Baseball catcher. He played for the New York Mutuals in 1871 and 1872, appearing in 38 games and hitting .226. He died on April 9, 1874, in Brooklyn, New York.
