= Dick Mills =

American baseball player (1945–2015)

- Pitcher
- Born: January 29, 1945; Boston, Massachusetts, U.S.
- Died: March 28, 2015 (aged 70); Scottsdale, Arizona, U.S.
- Batted: Right Threw: Right

MLB debut
- September 7, 1970, for the Boston Red Sox

Last MLB appearance
- September 13, 1970, for the Boston Red Sox

MLB statistics
- Win–loss record: 0–0
- Earned run average: 2.45
- Strikeouts: 3
- Stats at Baseball Reference

Teams
- Boston Red Sox (1970)

Richard Alan Mills (January 29, 1945 – March 28, 2015) was an American right-handed pitcher in Major League Baseball. Mills had originally been drafted by the Philadelphia Phillies in the 1965 amateur draft and by the Pittsburgh Pirates in the January 1966 draft, but did not sign with a Major League team until he was drafted by his hometown Boston Red Sox in June 1966. He made his Major League debut for Boston in 1970, coming into the sixth inning in relief of Chuck Hartenstein to finish an 8–2 blowout loss to the Cleveland Indians. His only other Major League appearance came in relief in another blowout, pitching two-thirds of an inning in an eventual 13–2 loss to the Baltimore Orioles.

Mills is the father of Ryan Mills, who pitched for seven seasons in the Minnesota Twins minor league system. The elder Mills began a website about pitching and pitching instruction. On that website, he noted that the injury-plagued Mark Prior had scapular loading in his pitching mechanics.

He died of melanoma on March 28, 2015.
