= Art Mills =

American baseball player and coach (1903–1975)

- Pitcher
- Born: March 2, 1903; Utica, New York, U.S.
- Died: July 23, 1975 (aged 72); Utica, New York, U.S.
- Batted: Right Threw: Right

MLB debut
- April 16, 1927, for the Boston Braves

Last MLB appearance
- June 11, 1928, for the Boston Braves

MLB statistics
- Win–loss record: 0–1
- Earned run average: 5.36
- Strikeouts: 7
- Innings pitched: 451/3
- Stats at Baseball Reference

Teams
- Boston Braves (1927–1928)

Career highlights and awards
- World Series champion (1945)

Arthur Grant Mills (March 2, 1903 – July 23, 1975) was an American professional baseball player and coach. A right-handed pitcher, Mills worked in 19 games for the 1927–28 Boston Braves, and later spent five full seasons (1944–48) as a coach for the Detroit Tigers of Major League Baseball. Mills was the sole member of manager Steve O'Neill's coaching staff for the 1945 world champion Tigers. He also spent 13 seasons in the minors as a player and coach.

The native and lifelong resident of Utica, New York, was the son of "Wee Willie" Mills, a pitcher who appeared in two games for the 1901 New York Giants. Art Mills was 16 years old when he joined the United States Navy during World War I; he was discharged for being underage after service aboard the battleship USS New Mexico (BB-40).

Listed as 5 feet 10 inches (1.78 m) tall and 155 pounds (70 kg), Mills began his professional pitching career in the Class A Eastern League in 1924, and after three seasons at that level, he made the opening day roster of the 1927 Braves, a struggling second-division team in the National League. He appeared in 15 games, 14 as a relief pitcher, and earned his only MLB decision when he was charged with an 8–7 loss to the Giants on July 3 at the Polo Grounds. Despite a creditable 3.82 earned run average, Mills was sent back to the minors for the balance of 1927. He was able to return to Boston for four more games with the Braves in 1928. But he was ineffective in his second and final big-league trial. Overall with the Braves, he allowed 27 earned runs, 58 hits and 26 bases on balls, with only seven strikeouts, in 451/3 inning pitched. He played his last game in organized baseball in 1934 and then returned to the semipro ranks in Utica from 1935–43.

During his 1931–32 stint with the Toronto Maple Leafs of the International League, Mills was managed by former big-league catcher O'Neill, and when O'Neill was skipper of the Detroit Tigers during World War II, he named Mills to his coaching staff in 1944. Mills was the only full-time coach listed for the 1945 Tigers, who defeated the Chicago Cubs in seven games to become World Series champions during the last year of the World War II manpower shortage.

O'Neill and his three-man coaching staff were released by Detroit after the 1948 season. Mills then coached in the top-level Pacific Coast League from 1949–51 before leaving the game.

Mills died on July 23, 1975, in Utica. He is buried at Forest Hill Cemetery in Utica.

== See also ==
- List of second-generation Major League Baseball players
