= Dan Mills =

American animator and layout artist (c.1931–2011)

Dan Mills (c. 1931 – December 5, 2011) was an American animator and layout artist. His credits included work for Walt Disney Animation Studios, Hyperion Pictures, Universal, Hanna-Barbera, Filmation, and Fox Animation.

Mills' long career in animation began in 1956. His credits as an animator included individual 1964 episodes of Linus the Lionhearted and the Cyrano episode of the ABC Afterschool Special, as well as the 1970s Hanna-Barbera television series Jabberjaw, Partridge Family 2200 A.D., These Are the Days, and Godzilla.

In addition to his work as an animator, Mills also worked as a layout supervisor, layout artist, art director, story director, and numerous other positions within the animation industry. Mills worked as the art director for the 1965 Cambria Productions series, Captain Fathom. He also became story director for three different Hanna-Barbera series launched in 1973, including Speed Buggy, Goober and the Ghost Chasers, and Inch High, Private Eye.

Mills worked extensively in animation layout. He was the layout supervisor for the He-Man and the Masters of the Universe and She-Ra: Princess of Power animated series by Filmation during the 1980s. He held additional layout supervisor credits for the Teenage Mutant Ninja Turtles series and a 1990 cartoon called Happily Ever After.

Mills' credits as a layout artist included several television series, including Pandamonium, which aired on CBS from 1982 to 1983, and, more recently, episodes of Family Guy. He also completed layout art for feature-length animated films, including The Secret of the Sword for Filmation in 1985, Pinocchio and the Emperor of the Night in 1987, Freddie as F.R.O.7 in 1992, Asterix Conquers America in 1994, The Pagemaster in 1994, and Cats Don't Dance, which was released in 1997.

His last professional credit was as a storyboard artist for The Hunchback of Notre Dame II, a direct-to-video sequel released by Walt Disney Studios Home Entertainment in 2002, after which he retired from the industry. Dan Mills died on December 5, 2011, at the age of 80. His funeral service was held at the First United Methodist Church in Reseda, California.
