= Handful of Keys (album) =

Compilation album (live) by Fats Waller
- Released: 1957
- Recorded: 1929–1942
- Genre: Jazz; stride
- Length: 58:33
- Label: RCA Victor; LPM 1502
- Producer: Mike Ragogna; Glenn Korman; Will Friedwald

A Handful of Keys is an album of live performances by jazz pianist Fats Waller & His Rhythm, the only authorized live performances of the musician. It features previously unreleased live radio transcriptions originally broadcast in 1938.

== Track listing ==
1. "Ain't Misbehavin'" (Waller, Harry Brooks, Andy Razaf) – 1:06
2. "The Joint is Jumpin'" (Waller, J. C. Johnson, Razaf) – 3:00
3. "Inside" (a.k.a. "Inside This Heart of Mine") (Waller) – 3:01
4. "I Had To Do It" (Waller, Razaf) – 2:15
5. "E Flat Blues" (Clarence Williams, Thomas Morris) – 2:48
6. "Hold My Hand" (Waller, Johnson) – 2:28
7. "Stop Beatin' 'Round the Mulberry Bush" (Clay Boland, Bickley Reichner) – 2:54
8. "What's The Matter With You" (Jimmy Webb, Stan Levey) – 2:31
9. "Hallelujah" (Vincent Youmans, Leo Robin, Clifford Grey) – 1:34
10. "What's Your Name" (Fats Waller, Johnson) – 3:26
11. "I Simply Adore You" (Paul Mann, Ned Weaver) – 2:37
12. "My Best Wishes" (Samuel Pokrass, Ted Koehler) – 2:29
13. "Handful of Keys" (Waller) – 1:57
14. "The Sheik of Araby" (Ted Snyder, Harry B. Smith, Francis Wheeler) – 3:16
15. "The Flat Foot Floogie" (Slim Gaillard, Slam Stewart, Bud Green) – 4:00
16. "St. Louis Blues" (W. C. Handy) – 1:57
17. "Pent Up In a Penthouse" (Williams, Tommie Connor) – 3:34
18. "Honeysuckle Rose" (Waller, Razaf) – 3:40
19. "I Got Rhythm" (George Gershwin, Ira Gershwin) – 2:36
20. "Some of These Days" (Shelton Brooks) – 2:12
21. "After You've Gone" (Turner Layton, Henry Creamer) – 2:01
22. "The Yacht Club Swing" (Waller, Johnson, Herman Autrey) – 3:11
- Recorded live at NBC Studios and The Yacht Club, New York, in 1938

== Personnel ==
Musicians

- Fats Waller – piano and vocals
- Herman Autrey – trumpet
- Gene Sedric – clarinet and tenor saxophone
- Al Casey – guitar
- Cedric Wallace – bass
- Slick Jones – drums

Production

- Mike Ragogna, Glenn Korman – producer
- Will Friedwald – producer, liner notes
