= Leonard Harper (producer) =

American producer, stager, and choreographer (1899–1943)

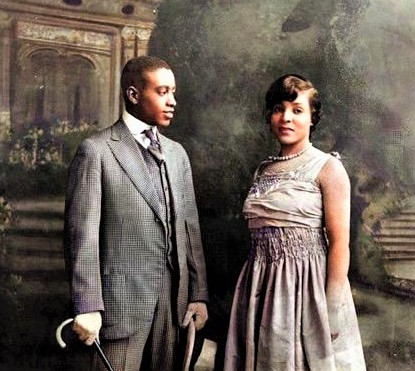
- Leonard Harper, ca 1920s
- Born: April 9, 1899
- Died: February 13, 1943 (aged 43)
- Occupations: Producer, stager, and choreographer

Leonard Harper (April 9, 1899, Birmingham, Alabama – February 4, 1943, Harlem, New York) was a producer, stager, and choreographer in New York City during the Harlem Renaissance in the 1920s and 1930s.

Harper's works spanned the worlds of vaudeville, cabaret, burlesque and Broadway musical comedy. As a dancer, choreographer and studio owner, he coached many of the country's leading performers, including Ruby Keeler, Fred Astaire and Adele Astaire, and the Marx Brothers. He produced floor shows and theatrical revues both uptown in Harlem and downtown on Broadway's Great White Way. He co-directed and staged the ensemble segments of The Exile and the short film Darktown Revue with Oscar Micheaux. Harper staged for Broadway Hot Chocolates at the Hudson Theatre and was the premiere producer who opened up the Cotton Club. He also produced Lindy Hop revues and an act called Harper's Lindy Hoppers at the Savoy Ballroom.

== Early life ==
Harper was born in 1899 in Birmingham, Alabama, to William Harper, a performer, and his wife. Harper started dancing as a child to attract a crowd on a medicine show wagon, traveling with the show throughout the South. In 1915, he first toured in New York City, and quickly moved to Chicago.

There he began choreographing and performing dance acts with Osceola Blanks of the Blanks Sisters, who became the first black act for the Shubert Brothers.

He married Osceola Blanks in 1923.

== Return to New York ==
Harper and Osceola Blanks performed in his first big revue, Plantation Days, when it opened at the Lafayette Theatre in Harlem in 1922–23. He began producing floor shows in Harlem and New York thereafter.

From 1923 to 1924, Harper offered the Duke Ellington Orchestra the house band position at the speakeasies Connie's Inn in Harlem and the Kentucky Club in Times Square. He was producing shows there and the Duke Ellington orchestra played as the house band at the Kentucky Club for the next four years. At the suggestion of drummer Sonny Greer, Ellington and his wife Edna, along with their son Mercer Ellington, stayed in one of Harper's Harlem apartment bedrooms in the early 1920s.

By 1925, Harper owned a Times Square dance studio where black dancers taught their dances to white performers. As a nightclub and Broadway producer, Harper counted Billie Holiday, Ethel Waters, Duke Ellington, Bill Robinson, Harold "Stumpy" Cromer of Stump and Stumpy and Count Basie among his colleagues. He introduced Louis Armstrong and Cab Calloway to New York show business, and worked with Mae West, Josephine Baker, Lena Horne, Fats Waller and Eubie Blake.

Harper was part of the transition team when the Deluxe Cabaret was turned into the Cotton Club, producing two of its first revues during its opening. His biggest milestone on the Great White Way was his staging of the Broadway hit Hot Chocolates, which established the classic Broadway show tunes "Black and Blue" and "Ain't Misbehavin'". Harper was one of the leading figures who transformed Harlem into a cultural center during the 1920s. His nightclub productions took place at Connie's Inn, the Lafayette Theatre, the new Apollo Theatre, and other theatres in New York.

He had a daughter, Jean Harper, out of wedlock with Fannie Pennington.

Harper died in Harlem, New York, on February 4, 1943, and Adam Clayton Powell Jr. conducted his funeral at the Abyssinian Baptist Church.

Stephi, Wild (2022-06-29). "The American Tap Dance Foundation Presents THE 2022 TAP DANCE AWARDS Next Month". BroadwayWorld.

== Legacy ==
A Harlem street was co-named after Harper on October 10, 2015, because of the efforts of his grandson, Grant Harper Reid. "Leonard Harper Way" is located on 7th Avenue (also known as Adam Clayton Powell Jr. Blvd.) and 132nd Street.

Harper was named a 2015 NAACP History Maker.

Leonard Harper's Congressional Record

The late Leonard Harper is one of this year's 2022 inductees into the ATDF Tap Dance Hall of Fame, the only Tap Dance Hall of Fame focused exclusively on 20th and 21st century professional tap dancers.
