= George Reed (musician) =

American jazz drummer and singer (1922–2011)

- Birth name: George Reed Wilbourn
- Born: September 2, 1922; Mount Hope, West Virginia, U.S.
- Died: October 9, 2011 (aged 89); Elmira, New York, U.S.
- Genres: Jazz
- Occupation: Musician
- Instrument(s): Percussion, vocals

George Reed Wilbourn (September 2, 1922 – October 9, 2011) was an American jazz drummer and singer who performed as George Reed.

== Biography ==
Reed was born in 1922 in Mount Hope, West Virginia. He grew up in Harlem, New York, near the Savoy Ballroom. His early mentors included the Count Basie musicians Jo Jones and Freddie Green.

In the course of his career, he played with Charlie Parker, Red Allen, Marian McPartland, Joe Venuti, Buddy Tate and Bertha Hope. In 1970, he toured Europe in the all-star formation Saints & Sinners with Vic Dickenson and Red Richards. In his later years, Reed performed as a percussionist and singer with the swing and dance band Lindy Hop Heaven. He often appeared at the Green Pastures jazz club in Elmira where he has lived since 1990 and was a mentor for younger jazz musicians. In the 2000s, he formed a trio with Jeff Barone (guitar) and Ron Oswanski (organ). Reed, who was active as a musician until 2010, died in October 2011 at the age of 89 at the Chemung County Nursing Facility in Elmira.

== Discography ==
- Red Allen: Live 1965 (Storyville Records, 1965)
- The Buddy Tate Celebrity Club Orchestra: Unbroken (MPS Records, 1970)
- The Saints & Sinners In Europe (MPS, 1970) with Rudy Powell, Red Richards, Vic Dickenson, Herman Autrey
- Marion McPartland, Jimmy McPartland & The All Star Jazz Assassins: !Wanted! (Improv, 1977)
- Lindy Hop Heaven: Goin' To Lindy Land (2002)
