= Cyril Haynes =

American jazz pianist and arranger (1915–1996)

- Born: Cyril Nathaniel Haynes; May 8, 1915; Panama Canal Zone
- Died: January 1996 (aged 80) Jamaica, Queens, New York, U.S.
- Genres: Jazz; Dixieland; swing
- Occupations: Musician; arranger
- Works: Piano
- Years active: 1930s–1970s
- Labels: Comet; Golden Crest; Black & White
- Education: Columbia University

Cyril Nathaniel "Spider" Haynes (May 8, 1915, Panama Canal Zone – January 1996) was an American jazz pianist and arranger.

== Early life ==
Haynes was raised in New York City, learned the piano as a child, and later studied at Columbia University.

== Career ==
He played in the band for the vaudeville show Dixie on Parade, then with trumpeter Billy Hicks in 1937, and worked as a pianist and arranger with Al Cooper's Savoy Sultans at New York's Savoy Ballroom in 1940/41. He was a member of the orchestra of Sidney and Wilbur De Paris. From the end of 1943, he played with Roy Eldridge, then in the trio of Cedric Wallace and with Frankie Newton, George James, and Barney Bigard (at the Onyx Club). In 1945, he recorded under own name for the Comet label; his co-players included Dick Vance, Don Byas, Al Casey, John Levy, and Harold "Doc" West. That same year, he played in a quartet with Budd Johnson, Denzil Best, and Johnny Williams for a recording on Black & White Records ("So Tired" b/w "Solitude").

In Hollywood, he worked with Slim Gaillard in 1947, then with Benny Carter. In 1949, he performed with his own trio at the Village Vanguard; in 1952, he played with Ben Webster, Ray Brown, and Milt Jackson. In the 1950s, he also worked with Noble Sissle and Andy Kirk and played for several years with Cab Calloway, whom he traveled with while performing for the halftime shows for the Harlem Globetrotters. He continued to record until 1961, and in the middle of the 1970s, he performed as a soloist in New York clubs such as the Cookery, the Embers, the Cotton Club, and Jimmy Ryan's.

Haynes worked for various artists at the Apollo Theater in New York City; he worked with names such as Billie Holiday, Lena Horne (1947), Dinah Washington, Peg Leg Bates, and Moms Mabley. As leader, he released two albums: Spider Plays and The Spider Weaves Piano Magic. On the latter, the second track, "Rosamond", he wrote for his wife. Haynes was a member of Musicians Union Local 802 and the American Society of Composers, Authors and Publishers (ASCAP).

== Personal life ==
In 1943, he married Rosamond Yarborough. Haynes had a son in July 1953.

He died in the blizzard of January 1996 from a massive heart attack while working on his front door in Jamaica, Queens.

== Selected discography ==
=== As leader/co-leader ===
- 1944: Morning Sadness (Comet T4)
- 1944: Across the Road / Cedar Manor (Comet T5)
- 1963: The Spider Weaves Piano Magic (Golden Crest 3091)

=== As sideman ===
- 1937: Billy Hicks and His Sizzling Six, Joe the Bomber / Fade Out (Variety 601)
- 1939: Al Cooper, Jumpin' at the Savoy (Decca 2526)
- 1939: Al Cooper, Jumpin' the Blues (Decca 2930)
- 1940: Al Cooper, Sophisticated Jump (Decca 3274) – as arranger
- 1944: Barney Bigard, Poon Tang (Black & White 1206)
- 1944: Barney Bigard, How Long Blues (Black & White 1207)
- 1952: Slim Gaillard, Slim Gaillard Cavorts (Clef MGC-138)
