= Hot Chocolates =

1929 musical revue

- Music: Fats Waller and Harry Brooks
- Lyrics: Andy Razaf
- Book: Andy Razaf
- Premiere: June 20, 1929: Hudson Theatre, New York City
- Productions: 1929 Broadway

Hot Chocolates is a musical revue with music by Fats Waller and Harry Brooks and book and lyrics by Andy Razaf. It was originally titled Tan Town Topics in hopes it would be picked up by Broadway. Performed at the Hudson Theater in New York City, it was directed by Leonard Harper and ran for 219 performances from June 20, 1929, to December 14, 1929. It is also referred to as Connie's Hot Chocolates, after premiering at Connie's Inn. It was staged, directed and produced by Leonard Harper. While the revue featured music and singing, including the subsequent hit "Ain't Misbehavin''", it was praised for the cast's dancing, including its male and female chorus lines.

Louis Armstrong made his Broadway debut as part of the show's ensemble. Cab Calloway later joined the cast as a replacement at Armstrong's recommendation. Calloway later adopted the song "(What Did I Do to Be So) Black and Blue," originally sung by Edith Wilson, for his performances decades later.

== Cast ==
- Louis Armstrong Ensemble
- Jimmie Baskette Ensemble
- Paul Bass Ensemble
- Madeline Belt Ensemble
- Dick Campbell Ensemble
- Baby Cox Ensemble
- Eddie Green (comedy sketches) Ensemble
- Billy Higgins Ensemble
- Louise Higgins Ensemble
- Jubilee Singers Ensemble
- Billy Marey Ensemble
- Dolly McCormick Ensemble
- Paul Meers Ensemble
- Thelma Meers Ensemble
- Jazzlips Richardson Ensemble
- Margaret Simms Ensemble
- Three Midnight Steppers Ensemble
- Edith Wilson Ensemble
- Cab Calloway Ensemble
