= Handful of Keys (disambiguation) =

Handful of Keys is a piano composition by Fats Waller.

Handful of Keys also may refer to:

- Handful of Keys (album), the only authorized live performance of Fats Waller & His Rhythm
- Handful of Keys (1960 album), a 1960 album of Fats Waller compositions on RCA (UK)
- "Handful of Keys" (Robert Wells song), a 2010 single by Robert Wells that topped the Swedish Singles Chart
