= Eddie Gibbs =

Eddie Gibbs may refer to:

- Eddie Gibbs (musician), American musician
- Eddie Gibbs (politician), New York Assembly member
