= Yank Porter =

American jazz musician

Yank Allen Porter (ca. 1895, Norfolk, Virginia – March 22, 1944, New York City) was an American jazz drummer.

Porter moved to New York City in 1926 and played there with Calvin Jackson until 1930. In the 1930s he worked with Charlie Matson (1932), Louis Armstrong (1933), Bud Harris (1933), James P. Johnson (1934, 1939), Fats Waller (1935–36), and Dave Martin (1936). In 1940 he played briefly with Joe Sullivan, then joined Teddy Wilson in a small group for the remainder of the year. He also did freelance recording with Benny Carter (1940) and Art Tatum (1941).
