= Sil Austin =

American jazz saxophonist (1929–2001)

Sylvester Austin (September 17, 1929 – September 1, 2001) was an American jazz saxophonist. He achieved his biggest success in an overtly commercial rather than jazz vein, but he regarded Coleman Hawkins, Lester Young, and Sonny Stitt as his major influences.

== Career ==
Austin was born in Dunnellon, Florida, United States, and taught himself to play as a 12-year-old. He won the Ted Mack Amateur Hour in St. Petersburg, Florida in 1945, playing "Danny Boy". His performance brought him a recording contract with Mercury Records, and he moved to New York, where he studied for a time at the Juilliard School of Music.

Austin played with Roy Eldridge briefly in 1949, and with Cootie Williams in 1951–52 and Tiny Bradshaw in 1952–54, before setting up his own successful touring group. He recorded over 30 albums for Mercury, and had a number of Top 40 hits with pop tunes like "Danny Boy" (his signature tune), "Slow Walk" and "My Mother's Eyes". "Slow Walk" peaked the highest at Number 17. Austin described the sound of his 1950s singles to author Wayne Jancik. "Exciting horn, honking horn, gutbucket horn is what kids wanted to hear, so I made sure I played more of that. They called it rock 'n' roll. And the records sold."

After leaving Mercury in the 1960s, he recorded with a few other labels, including SSS, owned by Shelby Singleton. He made also a few records in Japan in the 1970s.

Austin died of prostate cancer in 2001, at age 71. He was survived by his wife of 52 years, the Rev. Vernice Austin, two daughters, nine grandchildren, and seven great-grandchildren.

== Discography ==
- Slow Walk Rock (1957) – Mercury
- Everything's Shakin' (1957) – Mercury
- Battle Royal' (1959) – Mercury (with saxophonist Red Prysock)

Sil Austin, Red Prysock (tenor sax), Dave Martin (piano), Everett Barksdale, Kenny Burrell (guitar), Milt Hinton (bass), David "Panama" Francis (drums)

- Soft Plaintive and Moody – Mercury
- Plays Pretty for the People (1961) – Mercury
- Plays Pretties Melodies of the World (1964) – Mercury
- Honey Sax (1969) – SSS
- Sil & The Silver Screen – SSS
- Sax Moods Best of Sil Austin
- Best Selection (includes "Harlem Nocturne")

== See also ==
- "Harlem Nocturne"
