= Howard E. Johnson (musician) =

American jazz alto saxophonist (1908–1991)

Howard Johnson
- Born: Howard William Johnson; January 1, 1908
- Died: December 28, 1991 (aged 83)
- Genres: Jazz; swing
- Occupation: Musician
- Instrument: Alto saxophone

Howard William "Swan" Johnson (January 1, 1908 – December 28, 1991) was an American swing jazz alto saxophonist.

In New York City, Johnson was a member of bands led by Billy Cato, James P. Johnson, and Fess Williams. In the 1930s, he worked with Benny Carter and Teddy Hill, followed in the 1940s by Claude Hopkins and Maxine Sullivan. From 1946 to 1948, he was in Dizzy Gillespie's band. He recorded with Gillespie and with Red Norvo and Bessie Smith. He also worked with the Harlem Blues and Jazz Band led by Clyde Bernhardt and the Savoy Sultans led by Panama Francis. Born in 1908, he continued to work through the 1980s. He should not be confused with tuba player Howard Johnson.
