= Red Richards =

American jazz musician

Charles Coleridge "Red" Richards (October 19, 1912, New York City – March 12, 1998, Scarsdale, New York) was an American jazz pianist.

== Biography ==
Richards began playing classical piano at age ten and concentrated on jazz from age sixteen after hearing Fats Waller. His first major professional gig was with Tab Smith at the Savoy Ballroom in New York City from 1945 to 1949. Following this he played with Bob Wilber (1950–51) and Sidney Bechet (1951). He toured Italy and France in 1953 with Mezz Mezzrow's band alongside Buck Clayton and Big Chief Moore, also accompanying Frank Sinatra in Italy. He played with Muggsy Spanier intermittently from 1953 through the end of the decade and with Fletcher Henderson in 1957–58. In 1958, he performed as a solo act in Columbus, Ohio, then played with Wild Bill Davison in 1958–59 and again in 1962.

In 1960 he formed Saints & Sinners with Vic Dickenson, playing with this band until 1970. He joined jazz drummer Chuck Slate and his band in 1971 and stayed with him most of the year. He recorded an album with Slate called Bix 'n' All That Jazz. Following this he worked with Eddie Condon (1975–77), then led a trio in 1977–78. He played with Panama Francis and the Savoy Sultans worldwide from 1979 through the 1980s. He recorded with Bill Coleman in 1980. He continued to tour near to the time of his death in March 1998, in New York.

== Discography ==
=== As leader ===
- In a Mellow Tone (West 54, 1978)
- Soft Buns (West 54, 1979)
- It's a Wonderful World (Black & Blue, 1980)
- Lullaby in Rhythm (Sackville, 1985)
- I'm Shooting High (Sackville, 1988)
- Dreamy (Sackville, 1992)
- My Romance (Jazz Point, 1993)
- Swing Time (Jazz Point, 1993)
- Groove Move (Jazz Point, 1994)
- Echoes of Spring (Sackville, 1998)

=== As sideman ===
With Panama Francis

- Gettin' in the Groove (Black and Blue, 1979)
- Panama Francis and the Savoy Sultans (Classic Jazz, 1980)
- Grooving (Stash, 1982)

With Saints & Sinners

- Catch Fire at the Sheraton-Jefferson in St. Louis (Seeco, 1960)
- The Saints and Sinners (77 Records, 1964)
- Saints and Sinners in Canada (Cav-a-Bob, 1967)
- Sugar (MPS, 1968)

With Muggsy Spanier

- Chicago Jazz (RKO, 1958)
- Muggsy Spanier (Ace of Hearts, 1967)
- One of a Kind (Glendale, 1983)
- Hesitatin' Blues (Affinity, 1986)
- At Club Hangover San Francisco 1953–54 (Storyville, 1997)

With others

- Buster Bailey, All About Memphis (Felsted, 1958)
- Buck Clayton, Singing Trumpets (Jazztone, 1957)
- Bill Coleman, Really I Do (Black and Blue, 1982)
- Vic Dickenson, Just Friends (Sackville, 1986)
- Bobby Donaldson, Dixieland New York (World Wide, 1958)
- Bobby Donaldson, Dixieland Jazz Party (Savoy, 1959)
- Eddie Durham, Eddie Durham (RCA Victor, 1974)
- Fletcher Henderson All Stars, The Big Reunion (Jazztone, 1958)
- Bud Freeman, The Bud Freeman All Star Swing Sessions (Prestige, 2003)
- Marian McPartland, Marian McPartland's Piano Jazz Radio Broadcast (Jazz Alliance, 1994)
- Mezz Mezzrow, Swingin' with Mezz (Vogue, 1962)
- Pee Wee Russell, The Individualism of Pee Wee Russell (Savoy, 1978)
- Rex Stewart, Henderson Homecoming (United Artists, 1959)
- Maxine Sullivan, We Just Couldn't Say Goodbye (Audiophile, 1995)
- Skeets Tolbert, 1939–1942 (Everybodys, 1983)
- Dinah Washington, A Slick Chick: The Rhythm & Blues Years (Mercury, 1983)
- Benny Waters, Plays Songs of Love (Jazzpoint, 1993)
- George Wettling, George Wettling's Jazz Band from Stuyvesant Casino Featuring Hot Lips Page (Storyville, 1994)
- Jimmy Witherspoon, Sings the Blues with Panama Francis and the Savoy Sultans (Muse, 1983)

== Other sources ==
- Doran/Kernfeld, "Red Richards". Grove Jazz online.
