= Rudy Williams =

Rudy Williams may refer to:

- Rudy Williams (saxophonist) (1919-1954), American jazz saxophonist
- Rudy Williams (footballer) (born 1965), Honduran footballer
