= George Kelly (musician) =

American jazz tenor saxophonist and arranger (1915–1998)

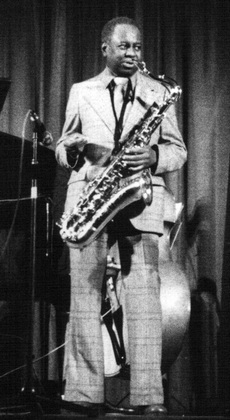
- Kelly in 1977

Background information
- Born: July 31, 1915; Miami, Florida, US
- Died: May 24, 1998 (aged 82)
- Genres: Jazz
- Occupation(s): Musician, arranger
- Instrument: Tenor saxophone
- Labels: Dharma

George Kelly (July 31, 1915 – May 24, 1998) was an American jazz tenor saxophonist and arranger born in Miami, Florida. Panama Francis was a sideman in Kelly's band in the 1930s; Kelly played in Francis's Savoy Sultans band in the 1970s, and had played in Al Cooper's band of the same name in the 1940s. Additionally, Kelly led his own bands and worked with other jazz artists such as Tiny Grimes, Rex Stewart and Cozy Cole.

"Kelly had a strong tenor tone that looked back towards the swing era while he was clearly aware of later developments."

== Discography ==
=== As leader/co-leader ===
- Stealing Apples (Dharma)
- Slide Kelly Slide/In the Mood (1976, Jazz Session)
- George Kelly in Cimiez (1979, Black & Blue)
- Fine and Dandy (1982, Barron)
- Cotton Club (1983)
- George Kelly Plays Don Redman (1984, Stash)
- Groove Move (1994, Jazzpoint)

=== As sideman ===
With Rex Stewart

- Rendezvous with Rex (Felsted, 1958)
