= Grachan Moncur =

Grachan Moncur may refer to:

- Grachan Moncur II (1915–1996), jazz bassist and father of Grachan Moncur III
- Grachan Moncur III (1937–2022), jazz trombonist
