= Grachan =

Grachan is a given name. Notable people with the name include:

- Grachan Moncur II (1915–1996), American jazz bassist
- Grachan Moncur III (born 1937), American jazz trombonist
