= Jesse Drakes =

American jazz trumpeter

Jesse Drakes (22 October 1924 - 1 May 2010) was an American jazz trumpet player. He was born in New York City.

Drakes hung out at Minton's Playhouse in his youth, and attended Juilliard in the 1940s. He played in the 1940s with Al Cooper's Savoy Sultans, Sid Catlett, J.C. Heard, Eddie Heywood, Deke Watson, and Sarah Vaughan (1947). He worked extensively with Lester Young; the pair collaborated on and off between 1948 and 1956. Alongside this Drakes played with Harry Belafonte, Gene Ammons, Sonny Stitt, (1953), Louie Bellson, (1955), and Duke Ellington (1956).

In the late 1950s he played less jazz and more R&B music, touring with King Curtis and playing at the Motown studios in the 1960s. From 1969 he was based out of New York, leading dance ensembles and singing. He gave an interview with Cadence in 1984. Drakes was found dead in his apartment in New York City on May 1, 2010. His date of death, therefore, is unknown. He is survived by a son, Charles L. Drakes of Rockville, Maryland.
