= Reynolds Price =

American poet

- Born: Edward Reynolds Price; February 1, 1933; Macon, North Carolina, U.S.
- Died: January 20, 2011 (aged 77); Durham, North Carolina, U.S.
- Education: Duke University (BA); Merton College, Oxford (BLitt)
- Occupations: Author, professor

Edward Reynolds Price (February 1, 1933 – January 20, 2011) was an American poet, novelist, dramatist, essayist and James B. Duke Professor of English at Duke University. Apart from English literature, Price had a lifelong interest in Biblical scholarship. He was a member of the American Academy of Arts and Letters.

== Biography ==
Price was born Edward Reynolds Price in Macon, North Carolina, on February 1, 1933, the first of two sons of William Solomon and Elizabeth Price. Both he and his mother narrowly survived an extremely taxing childbirth; family legend states that during these circumstances, Will Price prayed and made a promise to God that if his wife and son survived, he would quit drinking alcohol. Price's family, struggling under the economic climate of the Great Depression, resided in the rural North Carolina towns of Macon, Henderson, Warrenton, Roxboro, and Asheboro throughout his childhood. Rather than joining other boys his age in sports and outdoor activities, Price developed a childhood fondness for the arts – reading, writing, painting, and opera included. He attended Broughton High School in Raleigh, North Carolina and eventually received a full scholarship to Duke University, where he continued writing, served as the editor of Duke's literary magazine, The Archive, was elected to Phi Beta Kappa his junior year and graduated summa cum laude. After graduating in 1955, Price received a Rhodes Scholarship and attended Merton College, Oxford. While at Oxford, Price formed important friendships with the poet W. H. Auden, Stephen Spender, Sir Neville Coghill and the biographer Lord David Cecil. He devoted a significant portion of his literary studies, as well as his thesis, to English poet John Milton. Upon graduation with a B.Litt. in 1958, Price secured a position in the Duke University English department, where he stayed for the rest of his career, often teaching courses on Milton, creative writing, and the Gospels. Price made no secret from his close friends and colleagues that he was gay, but he was not open about the fact until the gay rights movement was in full swing and friends began to die of AIDS. He preferred to say he was "queer" in lieu of gay.

In the spring of 1984, a life-altering medical event occurred when Price reported difficulty walking and underwent testing at Duke University Hospital. James Schiff describes, "He soon learned of a 'pencil-thick and gray-colored' tumor, ten inches long and cancerous, which was 'intricately braided in the core of [his] spinal cord'." Although surgery and radiation managed to remove the tumor from his spine, Price became a paraplegic and required a wheelchair for the rest of his life. After enduring these initial years, Price emerged from this trying period "a more patient and watchful person and a dramatically more prolific writer." He still bore, however, "colossal, incessant pain", as he described. He wrote about his experience as a cancer survivor in his memoir A Whole New Life. Regarding his life after this tragedy, Price explains, "I'd have to say that, despite an enjoyable fifty-year start, these recent years since full catastrophe have gone still better. They've brought more in and sent more out – more love and care, more knowledge and patience, more work in less time."

In 1987, Duke University gave Price its highest honor when it awarded him the University Medal for Distinguished Meritorious Service.

Price died at the age of 77 on January 20, 2011, as a result of complications from a heart attack. The third volume of his three volumes of autobiography, Midstream, (Simon & Schuster, 2012) was completed by his long time friend Wallace Kaufman using his journals and a large archive of Price's letters.

== Career ==
Over his career, Price produced 38 total novels, short stories, and memoirs. Price is classified as a Southern writer, as his works are often especially associated with his lifelong home of North Carolina. Price's first ever published story, called "A Chain of Love", came in 1958. He wrote his first novel, A Long and Happy Life, and witnessed its publication in 1962. The work received the William Faulkner Foundation Award (1963) and has sold over a million copies. His 1986 novel Kate Vaiden also gained immense popularity and received the National Books Critics Circle Award. Price composed a memoir entitled Clear Pictures in 1989 which directly led to the production of a Charles Guggenheim documentary about the author's lifetime. He completed another memoir called A Whole New Life in 1994 which chronicled his journey after the discovery of cancer in his spine. The Collected Poems, containing four volumes of poetry – Vital Provisions (1982), The Laws of Ice (1986), The Use of Fire (1990), and The Unaccountable Worth of the World (1997) – was published in 1997.

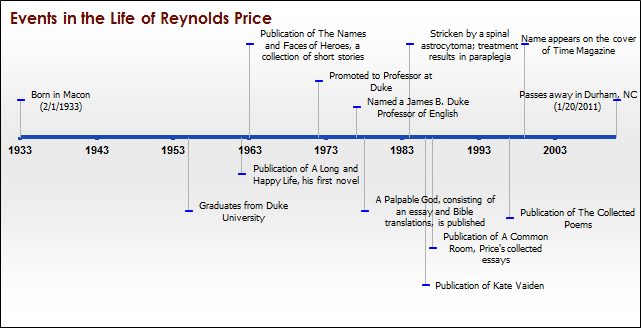
A Timeline of Price's life, based largely on the chronology found in Conversations with Reynolds Price

Price entered the realm of pop culture with the release and Top-40 status of James Taylor's song "Copperline," which he and Taylor wrote together. Bill Clinton characterized Price as one of his favorite authors.

On the cover of the December 6, 1999 issue of Time magazine, Price's name appeared. Victor Strandberg explains, "Price's name was next to a Renaissance portrait of Jesus alongside a headline that reads, 'Novelist Reynolds Price offers a new Gospel based on archeology and the Bible.' Inside the magazine, this cover story begins with Time's statement that 'A great novelist and biblical scholar examines what faith and historical research tell us after 2,000 years and emerges with his own apocryphal Gospel'."

== Personal life ==
Price lived alone, by choice, for all of his adult life and was openly homosexual. In 1957 he had an affair with the famous British poet Stephen Spender, visiting the Spender family home for Christmas.

Shortly after dawn on July 3, 1984, in the midst of treatment for his tumor, Price awoke in his bed and claimed to have had a life-changing mystic experience and vision in which he came in contact with Jesus Christ at the Sea of Galilee. Price gives an account of this occurrence in A Whole New Life:

It was the big lake of Kinnereth, the Sea of Galilee, in the north of Israel ... the scene of Jesus' first teaching and healing. I'd paid the lake a second visit the previous October. ... Still sleeping around me on the misty ground were a number of men in the tunics and cloaks of first-century Palestine. I soon understood with no sense of surprise that the men were Jesus' twelve disciples and that he was nearby asleep among them. ... Then one of the sleeping men woke and stood. I saw it was Jesus, bound toward me. ... Again I felt no shock or fear. All this was normal human event; it was utterly clear to my normal eyes and was happening as surely as any event of my previous life. ... Jesus bent and silently beckoned me to follow. ... Jesus silently took up handfuls of water and poured them over my head and back til water ran down my puckered scar. Then he spoke once—"Your sins are forgiven"—and turned to shore again, done with me. I came on behind him, thinking in standard greedy fashion, It's not my sins I'm worried about. So to Jesus' receding back, I had the gall to say "Am I also cured?" He turned to face me, no sign of a smile, and finally said two words—"That too."

== Reception ==
Despite the success of his best-selling novels and nationwide recognition on the cover of Time, Price has received a lesser degree of recognition than many of his contemporaries in American literature. James Schiff explains, "Despite the praise from reviewers, Price has not received a great deal of scholarly attention – certainly less than other members of his literary generation, such as John Updike, Philip Roth, Thomas Pynchon, Joyce Carol Oates, Toni Morrison, John Barth, Sylvia Plath, Susan Sontag, Don DeLillo, and Cynthia Ozick." But although he is less well-known than such writers, Price is widely celebrated by the literary community and the majority of his readers.

== List of publications ==
=== Novels ===
- A Long and Happy Life (1962)
- A Generous Man (1966)
- Love and Work (1968)
- The Surface of Earth (1975)
- The Source of Light (1981)
- Kate Vaiden (1986)
- Good Hearts (1988)
- The Tongues of Angels (1990)
- Blue Calhoun (1992)
- The Promise of Rest (1995)
- Roxanna Slade (1998)
- Noble Norfleet (2002)
- The Good Priest’s Son (2005)

=== Stories ===
- The Names and Faces of Heroes (1963)
- Permanent Errors (1970)
- The Foreseeable Future (1991)
- The Collected Stories (1993)

=== Essays, memoirs, and nonfiction writings ===
- Things Themselves: Essays & Scenes (1972)
- A Palpable God: Thirty Stories Translated from the Bible With an Essay on the Origins and Life of Narrative (1978)
- A Common Room: Essays 1954-1987 (1987)
- Clear Pictures: First Loves, First Guides (1989)
- A Whole New Life: An Illness and a Healing (1994)
- Three Gospels (1996)
- Learning a Trade: A Craftsman’s Notebooks, 1955-1997 (1998)
- Letter to a Man in the Fire: Does God Exist and Does He Care? (1999)
- Feasting the Heart: Fifty-Two Commentaries for the Air (2000)
- A Serious Way of Wondering: The Ethics of Jesus Imagined (2003)
- Letter to a Godchild: Concerning Faith (2006)
- Ardent Spirits: Leaving Home, Coming Back (2009)
- Midstream: An Unfinished Memoir (2012)

=== Poetry ===
- Vital Provisions (1982)
- The Laws of Ice (1986)
- The Use of Fire (1990)
- The Collected Poems (1997)

=== Plays ===
- Early Dark (1977)
- Private Contentment (1984)
- New Music: A Trilogy (1990)
- Full Moon and Other Plays (1993)

=== For children ===
- A Perfect Friend (2000)
