= Fannie Pennington =

Fannie Emma Pennington
- Born: February 1, 1914; Macon, North Carolina
- Died: February 13, 2013 (aged 99); New York City
- Occupations: Activist, organizer, fundraiser

Fannie Emma Pennington (February 1, 1914 – February 13, 2013) was an American activist, organizer, and fundraising coordinator for U.S. Congressional Representative (Harlem) Adam Clayton Powell Jr.'s Isaac Democratic Club and the Abyssinian Baptist Church A.C.P. Overseas Club. She was also a member of the New York City Board of Elections and the Frederick E. Samuel Community Democratic Club, the Satellite Club, the Courtesy Guild, the Progressive Ladies Usher Board of the Abyssinian Baptist Church, the ABC Welcome and Hospitality Committee. She was an official representative of the Barmaid Charity Organization. She was a New York leader of the bus organizing efforts in 1963 for the March on Washington.

During her career, Pennington greeted and hosted historic world figures, activists, and civil rights leaders including, Ambassador Andrew Young, Gil Noble, Bill Cosby, Jesse Jackson, Moms Mabley, Eleanor Roosevelt, Haile Selassie, Mary McLeod Bethune, Dr. Martin Luther King Jr., and Malcolm X.

== Life ==
Fannie Emma Pennington was born and raised in Macon, North Carolina. In the late 1940s, she was a bar maid at several clubs and bars in Harlem, including the original Red Rooster, the Palm Cafe and Tom Delaney's Mirror Bar. Pennington and her mother Hattie Harris are great-great-granddaughters of Sir William Harris of Essex, England. The Harris family moved from England to Macon, North Carolina and had both white and black offspring.

She had a daughter with Leonard Harper named Jean Harper.

In 1958, Pennington stepped into the political arena, working on a number of fund-raising campaigns for Adam Clayton Powell Jr. and community organizations. Then there was the historic March on Washington in 1963, where she coordinated buses from New York to Washington D.C. in an effort led by Bayard Rustin. In 1960 she formed and supervised The Glamourettes a group of young women who campaigned for the John F. Kennedy Presidential run. Pennington received citations and proclamations from the New York City Council Member C. Virginia Fields on March 26, 1992, for her civic service, and The Abyssinian Baptist Church Sept. 9, 1973 for Christian service (conferred along with Golden Membership by Abyssinian on Sunday, March 9, 2003).

== Honors ==
Pennington was honored by the NYC Board of Elections, Rev. Calvin Butts Pastor Abyssinian Baptist Church, City Council President Andrew Stein, Assemblywoman Geraldine Daniels, Judge George Bundy Smith, and Judge Henry Williams. She received the Samuel Proctor Phoenix Award from the Abyssinian Development Corporation on March 26, 1992, and chosen a Democratic County committee member of the 70th Assembly District 56 ED on October 1, 1983, by New York Assemblywoman Geraldine Daniels and U.S. Congressman Charles Rangel.

Pennington received the Adam Powell Merit Award (for Community Activity and Political Relations from the Alfred E. Isaac Club of Democrats from Cong. Adam Clayton Powell Jr. in 1965, the 5th. Council District Community Service Award by New York City Councilwoman C. Virginia Fields on August 11, 1991, Board of Elections Congratulations April 23, 1993, the Community Democratic Club of Harlem Award on May 30, 1981, and on June 13, 1997, by . Fred Samuel Councilman, a New York City Citation by New York City Councilwoman Inez E. Dickens on Feb. 1, 2010 and on April 1, 1992, Pennington received a New York State Legislative Resolution from Assemblywoman Geraldine Daniels. Pennington was featured (Photo of the Week) with New York State. Assemblyman Keith L.T. Wright in The Harlem Times on June 4, 2005. In 1992 U.S. Congressman Charles Rangel 16th District of New York presented Pennington with an Outstanding Achievement Recognition Award. On June 13, 1997, Pennington was presented with a Community Service Award by New York State Assemblyman Keith Wright and New York City Councilwoman C. Virginia Fields.

== Legacy ==
"Fannie Pennington Way" was approved for co-naming of 123rd Street & Manhattan Avenue by the City of New York Manhattan Community Board 10 at the General Board Meeting on Wednesday, June 7, 2017. On September 22, 2018, Fannie Pennington's grandson Grant Harper Reid unveiled "Fannie Pennington Way" on the North/East corner of Manhattan Avenue & 123rd Street in Manhattan. .

Pennington was named as one of the 2015 NAACP History Makers.

In the House of Representatives on 11 March 2011, Senator Charles Rangel spoke of women like Pennington as 'precious gifts we temporarily have in this world, but their assistance, contributions and accomplishments are far remembered and everlasting.' and concluded 'as we celebrate the 150th Anniversary of the Emancipation Proclamation, the 50th Anniversary of the March on Washington and the 100th Birthday of Rosa Parks, let us also celebrate the 99 years of our beloved Fannie E. Pennington.

== Bibliography ==
- Rangel, Charles B., and Leon E. Wynter. 2007. And I haven't had a bad day since: from the streets of Harlem to the halls of Congress. Page 108 New York: Thomas Dunne Books/St. Martin's Press. OCLC 77476435
- Halsell, Grace. 1969. Soul sister Pages 67–68. New York: World Pub. Co. OCLC 44992
- Maria G. Goodson (2015) Church Ladies Pages, 5, 33–35,36,40-41,42,182,183-186,314-317,340-341, based on the Abyssinian Baptist Church Oral History Project. (66 pages)
