= Rudy Williams (saxophonist) =

American jazz musician

Rudolph Williams (September 21, 1909 – August 30, 1954) was an American jazz alto saxophonist.

He was born in Newark, New Jersey, United States. Nicknamed 'Looney', Williams started on saxophone at age twelve, and concentrated on alto, though he was also capable on baritone and tenor sax. He became a member of the Savoy Sultans in 1937 and recorded frequently with the group. In the 1940s, he played with Hot Lips Page, Luis Russell, Chris Columbus, and John Kirby, and led his own bands in Boston and New York City later in the decade. He played with Tadd Dameron in 1948, and after more time as a bandleader in Boston in the early 1950s, he played with Illinois Jacquet and Gene Ammons in California. As a member of Oscar Pettiford's band, he toured East Asia in the 1950s. Williams also recorded with Howard McGhee, Dud Bascomb, Don Byas, Babs Gonzales, Eddie "Lockjaw" Davis, Eddie Vinson, Bennie Green, and Johnny Hodges. He never recorded as a bandleader.

Williams drowned while swimming in Hyannis, Massachusetts on August 30, 1954. His funeral was held in Newark and his pallbearers included Dizzy Gillespie, Pat Jenkins, and Babs Gonzales. He was interred in Fairmount Cemetery.

== Discography ==
=== As sideman ===
- Charlie Christian, After Hours (Vogue, 1982)
- Al Cooper, Jump Steady (Affinity, 1983)
- Tadd Dameron, The Tadd Dameron Band (Jazzland, 1962)
- Johnny Hodges, The Blues (Norgran, 1955)
- J. J. Johnson, Howard McGhee, Oscar Pettiford, Jazz South Pacific (Regent, 1956)
- Fats Navarro, Fats Navarro Featured With The Tadd Dameron Quintet (Jazzland, 1961)
