= Kate Vaiden =

1986 novel by Reynolds Price

- First edition
- Author: Reynolds Price
- Language: English
- Publisher: Atheneum Books
- Publication date: June 1986
- Publication place: United States
- Media type: Print (hardback & paperback)
- ISBN: 0-689-11787-6
- OCLC: 12942220
- Dewey Decimal: 813/.54 19
- LC Class: PS3566.R54 K3 1986

Kate Vaiden (1986) is the 6th novel by American author Reynolds Price. The novel focuses on the life of a white woman from the American South who, after a teenage pregnancy, abandons her son shortly after giving birth to him and who does not get in touch with him for four decades.

== Plot summary ==
Kate Vaiden is the first person narrator of the novel. When she sets out to tell the story of her life, she is a 57-year-old single woman. Having been diagnosed with cervical cancer seems to have changed her attitude to the family she left when she was seventeen without so much as writing them a letter—ever. Accordingly, she does not even know whether her son Lee, who must now be approaching 40, is still alive or not. In the final part of the book, which is set in 1984, she meets one of the last surviving members of her family, her cousin Swift, in a local nursing home. Swift eventually informs Kate that her son is alive and well but abroad with the US Navy.

=== Kate's story ===
Kate is born in 1927 and grows up as an only child in Greensboro, North Carolina with her young parents Dan and Frances Vaiden. Her happy childhood is suddenly interrupted when, in 1938, for reasons she can never quite fathom, her father shoots her mother and then himself, leaving her to be raised by her aunt and uncle, Caroline and Holt Porter. The Porters, whose grown-up sons no longer live at home, reside in Macon, and Kate takes some time to get used to living in a small village. As they are not farmers, Kate does not have to work for them after school or during the holidays. Over the years, Noony Patrick, the Porters' African American household help, becomes her only friend and confidante.

Kate has her first sexual encounter surprisingly early in life—at the age of twelve, without having had any sex education. One summer afternoon down by the Roanoke River, Gaston Stegall, the neighbours' boy, shows her his erection, and she gives him a handjob, without really knowing what she is doing.

Gaston said "He hurts me."

I said "How did you figure out it's a boy?" I stepped back a little.

But he said "Oh don't. You can help me out."

With all its faults, my family were not known for turning down pleas that deep from the heart. I moved back closer than I'd been before and said "Show me how."

...

In maybe twenty seconds the job was over. I'd brought a bandanna and cleaned myself, though I liked the smell and imagined it for days. By then he had got his legs still again, but his eyes were closed. I knew the answer but I said "Did it help?"

When she tells Noony, the sheer extent of Kate's ignorance becomes clear:

"You didn't get it on you? -- nowhere on your body."

I said "My hand. You said you could tell."

Noony said "On your privates. Keep it way off them; one drop of that stuff is good as a carload."

"For what?"

"Babies, fool." But she said it kindly.

I'd suspected as much and, as I've said, heard rumors at school; so I let Noony tell me all she knew.

At 13, Kate finally has sexual intercourse with Gaston. ("When Gaston said he didn't have a rubber, I swear I wondered what he needed to erase.") The lovers enjoy each other's company undisturbed by the outside world for a few years, but when the United States enters World War II Gaston enlists in the army and is killed in a Marines camp before he can actually go to war.

At 16, Kate escapes her surroundings and everything that might remind her of Gaston by stealing off to Norfolk, Virginia, where her cousin, Walter Porter, is living with his orphaned "friend," Douglas Lee, from back home. Having been ostracised from Macon, the two friends—whether they are actually a homosexual couple or not does not become clear—have never returned to their home town. However, Walter, who has a good job, promised Kate on the death of her parents that, whatever happens, she would always be welcome at his place. Now Kate takes him up on his word and is glad to see she is in no way regarded as an intruder.

Walter also takes care of Kate's education and sends her to a Catholic school for girls—even though she is a Methodist. The trio get on very well with each other, but, with Walter frequently away on business trips, Kate starts a secret affair with Douglas—without being truly in love with him. When she gets pregnant—while abortion is never a serious option for her—she starts wondering what her future life will be like but in fact is unable to decide on any course of action.

While Walter is making plans for her to stay, Kate and Douglas secretly plan to move to Raleigh, North Carolina and live there as a family. They actually get on a train to Raleigh, but when it stops at Macon while Douglas is at the toilet, Kate gets out without saying good-bye to him. On the spur of the moment, she decides to spend the last months of her pregnancy at her aunt and uncle's without the father of the child. In 1944, everyone has to get used to a young woman expecting an illegitimate child, but then Lee Vaiden is born and, as he is a strong, healthy boy, everything seems to be turning out fine.

However, Kate's maternal instinct fails her soon after she has given birth:

Considering how I was soon to behave, I have to wonder if I ever really loved him. I'd shown most other human instincts till then. Why did mothering fail me? In the months I knew him, I can honestly say I enjoyed his company. Nobody gets a long-term kick out of dirty diapers and spit-up milk, but Lee Vaiden more than made up for his faults. I'd tend him all day, bathe, feed him, enjoy him. Then about sundown I'd start feeling like he was Caroline's and Holt's -- and Noony's. They were glad to take over, in perfect silence.

Also, it occurs to Kate that a life without a man is not the right thing for her:

With Gaston and Douglas I'd used my body more ways than any white girl my age I'd read about or known. And for all the harm I'd caused the world, nothing convinced me my body was wrong and ought to be curbed. ... I couldn't just maim that much of myself by bolting doors on the wide green world and camping-down forever in a house with no man near me under sixty years old.

One day, Kate decides to join Douglas in Raleigh and to leave her son in her aunt's care. In Raleigh, unable to find Douglas, she makes the acquaintance of a young blind man called Whitfield Eller, who works as a piano tuner. Realizing that sooner or later she will have to take a job, Kate teams up with Eller, driving the blind man's car to get him safely and on time to his customers. All the time, her plans to fetch the baby are somewhere at the back of her mind.

Without ever seeing his son, Douglas, who used to be Eller's driver before Kate, commits suicide in Eller's bathroom, obviously because of the high debts he has run up. When Eller proposes to Kate, the latter, who has turned out to be a quitter, once again leaves everything behind her and moves on—this time to Greensboro, where she joins her former teacher, Miss Limer. It is now that she finally abandons her son. She starts working in a library, becomes involved with Jay Mabry, a war veteran, but again backs out when he wants to get married. She spends the next decades as a single woman working in a lawyer's office, never more than a two-hour drive away from her old home and, accordingly, easy to track down. We never learn why exactly it is that she is never contacted.

== Critical reception ==
Kate Vaiden was awarded the National Book Critics Circle Award.
