= Savoy Sultans =

American jazz ensemble

The Savoy Sultans was the name of two related 20th-century American jazz ensembles.

== Savoy Sultans (1937–1946) ==
The original Savoy Sultans were formed by saxophonist Al Cooper, and played at the Savoy Ballroom from 1937 to 1946. This small swing jazz ensemble comprised, at various times, Jack Chapman, Sam Massenberg, Dave Burns, Jesse Drakes and Pat Jenkins on trumpets; Skinny Brown, Rudy Williams, Ed McNeil, Lennie Simmons, Thomas Turrentine Sr. and George Kelly on saxophones; Cyril Haynes, piano; Grachan Moncur II on double bass; Alex "Razz" Mitchell on drums and vocalist Evelyn White.

Opening at the Savoy Ballroom on Lenox Avenue, Harlem, on Labor Day in 1937, they recorded seven times with Decca Records between 1938 and 1941. According to one reviewer, their recorded legacy leaves much to be desired, although contemporary reports by musicians such as Dizzy Gillespie gave the group high praise. They broke up in 1946.

== Savoy Sultans (1974–early 1990s) ==
The name Savoy Sultans was resurrected by Panama Francis in 1974 for a one-off concert, and was turned into a regular ensemble in 1979. He maintained the same instrumentation but added rhythm guitar. This group recorded for Black & Blue Records in 1979 and again with Stash Records in 1982 and 1983. Members included Francis Williams, Irv Stokes, Spanky Davis, Norris Turney, Howard E. Johnson, Bobby Watson, and Red Richards. George Kelly reprised his role in this later ensemble.
