= Darktown Revue =

1931 film

- Directed by: Oscar Micheaux Leonard Harper
- Written by: Oscar Micheaux
- Produced by: Oscar Micheaux; Alice B. Russell
- Starring: Tim Moore; Andrew Tribble; Celeste Cole; Amon Davis; Donald Heywood Choir
- Cinematography: Lester Lang; Walter Strenge
- Release date: 1931
- Running time: 18 min.
- Country: United States
- Language: English

Darktown Revue (1931) is an 18-minute American Pre-Code short film by Oscar Micheaux, his first short venture into sound film. The dances and ensembles were co-directed by Leonard Harper and the picture was shot along with their feature-length all-black talkie, The Exile. As in many early talkies, the camera-work is extremely static. The film included choral singing and several vaudeville acts, including the comedy duo of Tim Moore and Andrew Tribble doing a routine about a haunted house.
