= All About Memphis =

Studio album by Buster Bailey
- Released: 1958
- Recorded: February 13 and 27, 1958
- Studio: NYC
- Genre: Jazz
- Label: Felsted; FAJ.7003
- Producer: Stanley Dance

All About Memphis is an album by clarinetist Buster Bailey which was recorded in 1958 and released on the Felsted label.

== Reception ==
Professional ratings
Review scores
Source	Rating
AllMusic	4/5 stars
All About Jazz	5/5 stars

Scott Yanow of AllMusic states, "Buster Bailey was one of the top clarinetists to emerge during the 1920s but he led relatively few sessions throughout his long career. ... In addition to W.C. Handy tunes, the other five songs are Bailey originals that mix together swing and the flavor of New Orleans jazz. It's a fine outing for the classic clarinetist". On All About Jazz Andrew J. Sammut said "Fortunately jazz raconteur Stanley Dance saw fit to put just Bailey (and some of his original compositions) in front of a rhythm section on the short-lived Felsted label, highlighting the phenomenal technique that kept him so consistently in demand ... After so many years of Bailey sharing solo space alongside more famous colleagues, and even on his own date, it's still surprising but also rewarding to hear Bailey cutting loose".

== Track listing ==
All compositions by Buster Bailey except where noted.

1. "Bear Wallow" (Buster Bailey, Dick Vance) – 7:22
2. "Hatton Avenue & Gayoso Street" (Bailey, Vance) – 4:08
3. "Sunday Parade" (Bailey, Vance) – 5:31
4. "Beale Street Blues" (W. C. Handy) – 4:08
5. "Memphis Blues" (Handy) – 7:36
6. "Chickasaw Bluff" – 6:08
7. "Hot Water Bayou" – 4:22

== Personnel ==
- Buster Bailey – clarinet
- Herman Autrey – trumpet (tracks 1, 3 and 6)
- Vic Dickenson – trombone (tracks 1, 3 and 6)
- Hilton Jefferson – alto saxophone (tracks 1, 3 and 6)
- Red Richards – piano
- Gene Ramey – bass
- Jimmy Crawford – drums
