= Macon, North Carolina =

- Town
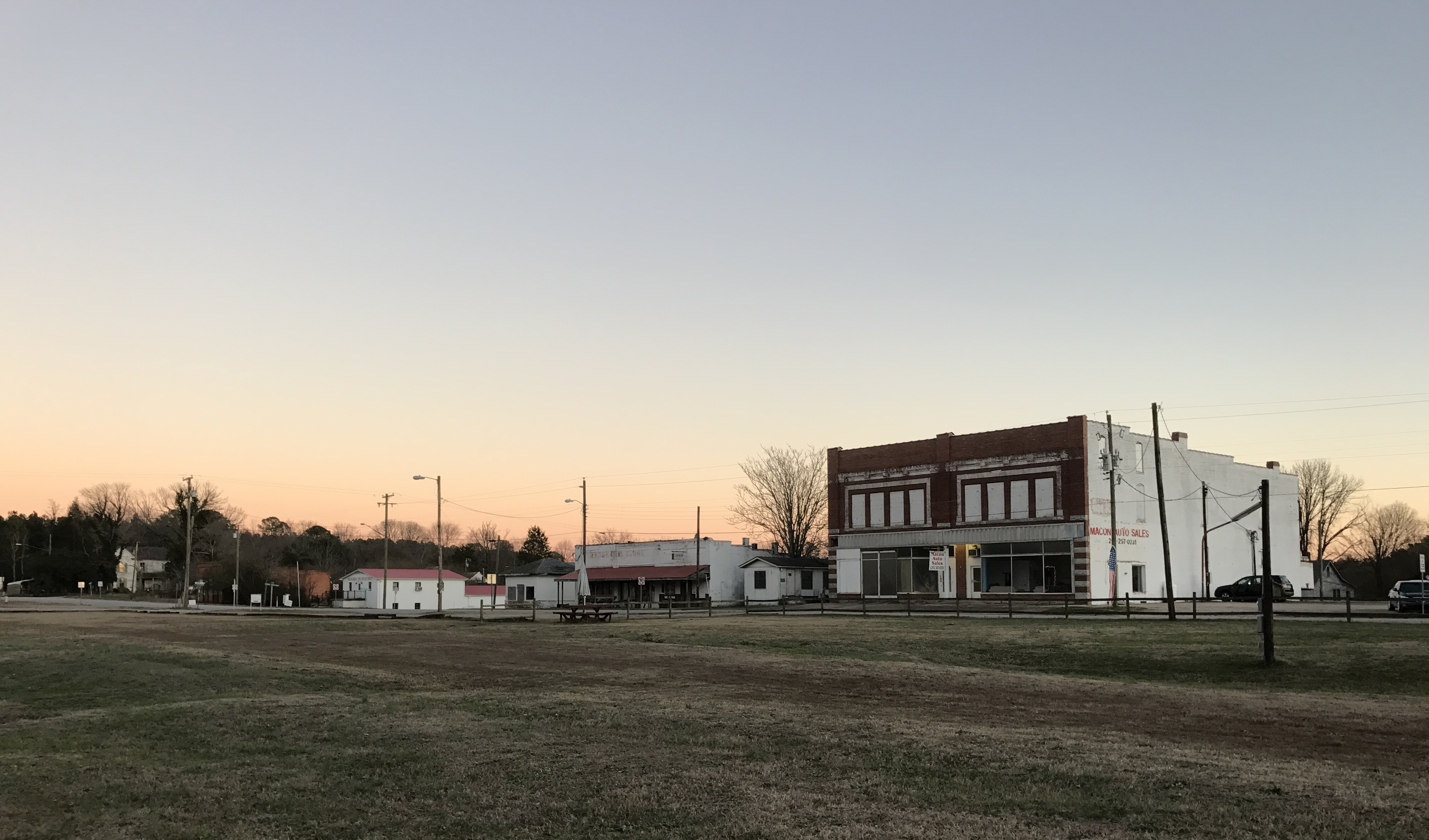
- Macon in January 2019

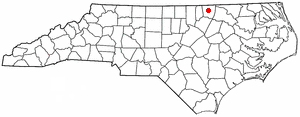
- Location of Macon, North Carolina
- Coordinates: 36°26′23″N 78°05′02″W
- Country: United States
- State: North Carolina
- County: Warren

Area
  - Total: 0.47 sq mi (1.22 km^{2})
  - Land: 0.47 sq mi (1.22 km^{2})
  - Water: 0 sq mi (0.00 km^{2})
- Elevation: 377 ft (115 m)

Population (2020)
  - Total: 110
  - Density: 233.6/sq mi (90.19/km^{2})
- Time zone: UTC-5 (Eastern (EST))
  - Summer (DST): UTC-4 (EDT)
- ZIP code: 27551
- Area code: 252
- FIPS code: 37-40540
- GNIS feature ID: 2406072

Macon is a town located in Warren County, North Carolina, United States. As of the 2020 census, Macon had a population of 110. It is named for Nathaniel Macon, long-time Speaker of the U.S. House of Representatives.

== Geography ==
According to the United States Census Bureau, the town has a total area of 0.4 square miles (1.0 km^{2}), 0.4 square miles (1.0 km^{2}) all land.

== Demographics ==
Historical population
Census	Pop.	Note	%±
1900	157		—
1910	189		20.4%
1920	149		−21.2%
1930	227		52.3%
1940	197		−13.2%
1950	238		20.8%
1960	187		−21.4%
1970	179		−4.3%
1980	153		−14.5%
1990	154		0.7%
2000	115		−25.3%
2010	119		3.5%
2020	110		−7.6%
U.S. Decennial Census

=== 2020 census ===
Macon racial composition
Race	Num.	Perc.
White (non-Hispanic)	86	78.18%
Black or African American (non-Hispanic)	16	14.55%
Native American	1	0.9%
Asian	0	0.00%
Other/Mixed	7	6.36%
Hispanic or Latino	2	1.81%

At the 2020 census, there were 110 people, 33 households, and 18 families in the town. The population density was 234.04 inhabitants per square mile (90.36/km^{2}). There were 54 housing units at an average density of 114.9 per square mile (44.4/km^{2}).

=== 2010 census ===
At the 2010 census, there were 119 people, 52 households, and 38 families residing in the town. The population density was 253.2 inhabitants per square mile (97.8/km^{2}). There were 63 housing units at an average density of 44.5 per square mile (17.2/km^{2}). The racial makeup of the town was 101 (84.87%) white, 16 (13.45%) black, 1 (0.84%) Native American, and 1 (0.84%) from two or more races. None of the population was Hispanic or Latino.

There were 52 households, out of which 13 (25%) had children under the age of 18 living with them, 29 (55.8%) were married couples living together, 7 (13.5%) had a female householder with no husband present, 1 (1.9%) was an unmarried opposite-sex couple, and 14 (26.9%) were non-families. 12 (23.1%) of all households were made up of individuals, and 9 (17.3%) had someone living alone who was 65 years of age or older. The average household size was 2.29, and the average family size was 2.68.

In the town, the population was spread out, with 20 (16.8%) under the age of 18, 8 (6.7%) aged 18 to 24, 18 (15.1%) aged 25 to 44, 52 (43.7%) aged 45 to 64, and 21 (17.6%) who were 65 years of age or older. The median age was 50.8 years. For every 100 females, there were 116.4 males.

=== 2000 census ===
As of the census of 2000, there were 115 people, 45 households, and 34 families residing in the town. The population density was 252.8 inhabitants per square mile (97.6/km^{2}). There were 63 housing units at an average density of 138.5 per square mile (53.5/km^{2}). The racial makeup of the town was 81.74% White, 13.04% African American, 1.74% Native American, 0.87% Asian, 0.00% Pacific Islander, 0.00% from other races, and 2.61% from two or more races. 1.74% of the population were Hispanic or Latino of any race.

There were 45 households, out of which 26.7% had children under the age of 18 living with them, 57.8% were married couples living together, 13.3% had a female householder with no husband present, and 24.4% were non-families. 20.0% of all households were made up of individuals, and 6.7% had someone living alone who was 65 years of age or older. The average household size was 2.56 and the average family size was 2.94.

In the town, the population was spread out, with 19.1% under the age of 18, 7.0% from 18 to 24, 25.2% from 25 to 44, 30.4% from 45 to 64, and 18.3% who were 65 years of age or older. The median age was 44 years. For every 100 females, there were 101.8 males. For every 100 females age 18 and over, there were 97.9 males.

The median income for a household in the town was $40,521 and the median income for a family was $55,625. Males had a median income of $26,667 versus $22,917 for females. The per capita income for the town was $17,642. 5.7% of the population and 6.5% of families were below the poverty line. Out of the total people living in poverty, none were under the age of 18 and 14.8% were 65 or older.

== Notable people ==
Macon is the birthplace of writer and professor at Duke University, Reynolds Price, and the setting of his 1986 novel, Kate Vaiden. Fannie Pennington, an activist, was also born and raised here.
