= Saints & Sinners (jazz band) =

Saints & Sinners was an American jazz sextet, founded by Red Richards and Vic Dickenson in 1960. The group was initially an impromptu pickup ensemble, but soon became one of the highly regarded Dixieland jazz ensembles of the 1960s. The group toured the U.S. and Canada and did two tours of Europe in 1968 and 1969 before disbanding in 1970. Its members included Herman Autrey, Buster Bailey, Rudy Powell, Buddy Tate, Truck Parham, Barrett Deems, George Foster, George Reed, and Dan Mastri.

== Discography ==
- Catch Fire at the Sheraton-Jefferson in St. Louis (Seeco, 1960)
- The Saints & Sinners (77 Records, 1964)
- Saints & Sinners in Canada (Cav-a-Bob, 1967)
- Saints & Sinners in Europe (SABA, 1969)
