= Comet Records =

Former American record label

Comet Records was an American jazz and R&B record label, founded in 1944 by Les Schriber, Sr. (Note: Lester Wilmot Wilbert Schriber, Sr. (1901–1965)) and Harry Alderton. The company issued 78 rpm shellac records and focused on both established and emerging talent. The label is most known for having recorded and produced T-Bone Walker, Cow Cow Davenport and Red Norvo. The label was acquired by Black & White Records and operated as a subsidiary. Comet recorded – but never released – a session with Charlie Parker on June 6, 1945. That master was sold to Dial Records in 1949, when Black & White Records went out of business.

== Selected session discography ==
Red Norvo and His Selected Sextet recorded June 6, 1945, at WOR Recording Studios, 1440 Broadway, New York. The master was originally owned by Comet, but sold to Dial Records who first released some of the cuts. The musicians were Dizzy Gillespie, Charlie Parker, Flip Phillips, Red Norvo, Teddy Wilson, Slam Stewart, Specs Powell, and J.C. Heard. Heard alternated with Powell.

Various reissues (compilations)

- OCLC 16669751, 761013263; OCLC 57497670, 493441849, 881638634.

Various takes

T6–A	"Halleluliah"	Comet T6; reissued on Dial 1045
T6–B	"Slam Slam Blues"	Comet T6; reissued on Dial 1045
T8–1	"Hallelujah" ("Sing Hallelujah")	Dial LP903
T8–2	"Hallelujah"	unissued, presumed lost
T8–3	"Hallelujah"	unissued, presumed lost
T8–4	"Hallelujah"	unissued, presumed lost
T8–4	"Hallelujah"	Dial 1045
T8–6	"Hallelujah"	Dial LP903
T9–1	"Get Happy"	unissued, presumed lost
T9–2	"Get Happy"	Dial 1035 and LP 903
T9–3	"Get Happy"	unissued, presumed lost
T9–4	"Get Happy"	Comet T7; reissued on Dial LP903
T10–1	"Slam Slam Blues" ("Bird's Blues")	Comet 1045; reissued on Dial LP903
T10–2	"Slam Slam Blues"	Comet T6; reissued on Dial LP 903
T11–AA	"Congo Blues"	Dial LP903
T11–BB	"Congo Blues"	Dial LP903
T11–1	"Congo Blues"	Dial LP903
T11–2	"Congo Blues" (incomplete take)	Dial 1035
T11–3	"Congo Blues"	Comet T7; reissued on Dial LP903
T11–4	"Congo Blues" (incomplete take)
T11–5	"Congo Blues"

=== References ===
- Comet T6 (1945); OCLC 62466441
- Comet T7 (1945); OCLC 297498973
- Dial 1045 (1949); OCLC 297498973
- Dial LP903; OCLC 6690888

== Comet artists & their original shellac (78rpm) releases ==
Cow Cow Davenport
- C-1 "Gotta Girl For Every Day In The Week" / "Jump, Little Jitterbug" (1944)
- C-2 "Jeep Boogie" / "Chimin' Away" (1944)
- C-3 "Hobson City Stomp" / "Run Into Me" (1944)
- C-4 "Cow Cow's Stomp" / "Gin Mill Stomp" (1944)

Art Tatum Trio (featuring Tiny Grimes and Slam Stewart)
- T-1 "The Man I Love" / "Dark Eyes" (1944); OCLC 62466439
- T-2 "Body and Soul" / "I Know That You Know" (1944); OCLC 62466436
- T-3 "On The Sunny Side of the Street" / "Flying Home" (1944); OCLC 62466425

Cyril Haynes (de) Sextet (featuring Don Byas) (Cyril Nathaniel Haynes; 1915–1996)
- T-4 "Morning Madness" / "One Sad Thursday" (1945); OCLC 867307733
- T-5 "Across The Road" / "Cedar Manor" (1945)

Red Norvo & His Selected Sextet (featuring Charlie Parker)
- T-6 "Halleluliah" [sic] / "Slam Slam Blues" (1945); OCLC 62466441

Reissued by Dial (1949); OCLC 29747056

- T-7 "Get Happy" / "Congo Blues" (1945); OCLC 297498973

Reissued by Dial (1949); OCLC 29747029

Four Kings & A Queen / Orval "Baggie" Hardiman (1913–1999)
- 1301 "All I Need Is A Lucky Break" / "Shoo Shoo Baby" (1944)
- 1302 "King's Boogie" / "Lost My Sugar In Salt Lake City" (1944)
- 1304 "One Of Those Dreams That Fell Thru" / "Ration Blues" (1945)

T-Bone Walker & His Guitar (unissued Black & White masters except the previously issued "T-Bone Shuffle")
- T-50 "West Side Baby" / "Lonesome Woman Blues" (issued 1948); OCLC 42466068
- T-51 "I'm Still In Love With You" / "Inspiration Blues" (issued 1948); OCLC 732376024
- T-52 "That Old Feelin' Is Gone" / "Description Blues" (issued 1948); OCLC 732376031
- T-53 "First Love Blues" / "T-Bone Shuffle" (issued 1949); OCLC 42386027

Jack McVea & His All Stars
- T-100 "B.B. Boogie" / "H.P. Boogie" (1948)

Previously issued by Black & White as "Bartender Boogie" (1945); OCLC 732367252
Previously issued by Black & White as "House Party Boogie" (1946); OCLC 732367263
