= John "Bugs" Hamilton =

American jazz trumpeter

John "Bugs" Hamilton (March 8, 1911, St. Louis – August 15, 1947, St. Louis) was an American jazz trumpeter.

Hamilton was a member of New York City-based trombonist Billy Kato's band in 1930-1931 and played with Chick Webb around the same time. Toward the middle of the 1930s he played with Kaiser Marshall, then joined Fats Waller's ensemble in 1938. He remained with Waller until 1942, touring and recording with him often and appearing in several films as a member of Waller's group. During World War II he played with Eddie South and Roy Eldridge, but shortly after the end of the war, he contracted tuberculosis, resulting in his death at age 36.

== Other sources ==
- "John "Bugs" Hamilton". The New Grove Dictionary of Jazz. 2nd edition, 2001, ed. Barry Kernfeld.
