= Eddie Gibbs (musician) =

American jazz musician

Edward L. Gibbs (December 25, 1908 – November 12, 1994) was an American jazz banjoist, guitarist, and bassist.

Gibbs began his career late in the 1920s, playing with Wilbur Sweatman, Eubie Blake, and Billy Fowler. As a banjoist he was strongly influenced by Elmer Snowden. He played with Edgar Hayes from 1937 and played with him on a tour of Europe in 1938. After a short stint with Teddy Wilson, Gibbs joined Eddie South's ensemble in 1940, and worked later in the decade with Dave Martin, Luis Russell, and Claude Hopkins. As a bassist, he led his own trio at the Village Vanguard and played in a trio with Cedric Wallace, but returned to banjo in the 1950s during the Dixieland jazz revival. He played with Wilbur de Paris among others during this time.

After studying with Ernest Hill, Gibbs returned to bass in the middle of the 1950s, but played banjo once again in the 1960s during another surge in interest in the Dixieland groups. He played at the World's Fair in 1965 and in 1969 he played bass (and occasionally banjo) as a member of "Buzzy Drootin's Jazz Family" which included Herman Autrey, Benny Morton, Herb Hall, Sonny Drootin on piano and Buzzy on drums. He retired from active performance in the 1970s.
