= Black and Blue (Fats Waller song) =

1929 jazz standard and racial protest song

Sheet music, 1929

"(What Did I Do to Be So) Black and Blue" is a 1929 jazz standard protest song, composed by Fats Waller and Harry Brooks, with lyrics by Andy Razaf. It was originally published by Mills Music.

== Composition and debut ==
"Black and Blue" debuted in the Broadway musical Hot Chocolates (1929), sung by Edith Wilson. Razaf biographer Barry Singer recounts that the lyricist was coerced into writing the song (with music by Waller) by the show's financier, New York mobster Dutch Schultz, though Razaf subverted Schultz's directive that it be a comedic number:

He demanded a comedy song for a lady who says how tough it is to be black...He literally put a gun to Andy's head and told him that if he didn't write it he would never write again. The opening-night response to the song was silence -people were stunned. Then they went crazy. Andy hadn't written the comedy song Schultz wanted, but because it was a hit, Schultz left him alone.

— Barry Singer, author of "Black and Blue: The Life and Lyrics of Andy Razaf

In the show, Wilson originally sang the song from a bed with white sheets, but the bed was removed after the first show due to the judgement that it was too suggestive.

The show also included Waller and Razaf's hit songs "Ain't Misbehavin'" and "Honeysuckle Rose".

== Recordings ==
- Louis Armstrong was the first to record the song, in 1929.
- Ethel Waters (1930)
- Frankie Laine (1946)

== Mentions in other works ==
The song is featured in the prologue of Ralph Ellison's novel Invisible Man (1952) as its protagonist, while hiding underground in a basement with 1369 light bulbs, listens to the song being played by Armstrong and contemplates the "horrors of slavery" while smoking a reefer. In June 2026, CBS News included the song in its list of the 250 essential American songs of the past 250 years.

== See also ==
- List of 1920s jazz standards
