= Rudy Powell =

American jazz musician

Rudy Powell (later Musheed Karweem) (October 28, 1907 – October 30, 1976) was an American jazz reed player.

Born in New York City, United States, Powell learned piano and violin while young and then clarinet and saxophone. In the late 1920s, he played with June Clark, Gene Rodgers's Revellers, and Cliff Jackson's Krazy Kats (1928–1930).

He never recorded as a leader, but worked extensively as a sideman throughout his career. Among his credits are (in roughly chronological order) Elmer Snowden, Dave Nelson, Sam Wooding, Kaiser Marshall, Rex Stewart (1933), Fats Waller (1935–37), Edgar Hayes, Claude Hopkins (1938–39, 1944), Teddy Wilson, Andy Kirk (1940–41), Fletcher Henderson (1941–42), Eddie South, Don Redman (1943), Chris Columbus, Cab Calloway (1945–48), Lucky Millinder (1949–51), Jimmy Rushing, Buddy Tate, Benton Heath (1953–61), Ray Charles (1961–62), Buddy Johnson, Duke Ellington, and Saints & Sinners (1965–69). He continued playing intermittently into the 1970s.

Powell appears in A Great Day in Harlem.

Powell also belonged to the Ahmadiyya Muslim Community.

He died in October 1976, at the age of 69.

== Discography ==
=== As sideman ===
- Cat Anderson, Ellingtonia (Wynne, 1959)
- Al Casey, Buck Jumpin' (Prestige Swingville, 1960)
- Duke Ellington, My People (Flying Dutchman, 1963)
- Cliff Jackson, Cliff Jackson and His Crazy Kats 1930 (Retrieval, 1981)
- Jo Jones, The Jo Jones Special (Vanguard, 1972)
- Andy Kirk, Instrumentally Speaking (MCA, 1980)
- Lucky Millinder, Cab Calloway, Awful Natural (RCA 1977)
- Jimmy Rushing, Listen to the Blues with Jimmy Rushing (Vanguard, 1956)
- Jimmy Rushing, Little Jimmy Rushing and the Big Brass (Columbia, 1958)
- Jimmy Rushing, The Jazz Odyssey of Jimmy Rushing (Philips, 1957)
- Saints & Sinners, Saints and Sinners in Canada (Cav-a Bob 1967)
- Saints & Sinners, The Saints and Sinners (77 Records, 1964)
- Fats Waller, Handful of Keys (RCA Victor, 1957)
