= J. C. Johnson =

American musician (1896–1981)

- Born: Jay Cee Johnson; September 14, 1896; Chicago, Illinois, U.S.
- Died: February 27, 1981 (aged 84); New York City, U.S.
- Occupations: Pianist, songwriter

Jay Cee Johnson (September 14, 1896 – February 27, 1981), usually known as J. C. Johnson and in some sources, mistakenly, as James C. Johnson (not to be confused with his near-contemporary James P. Johnson), was an American pianist and songwriter, best known for his collaborations with Fats Waller and Bessie Smith.

== Early life and career ==
Johnson was born in Chicago, and moved to New York City in the early 1920s. He began working as a session pianist with singer Ethel Waters, who sang his first recorded song as a writer, "You Can't Do What My Last Man Did", in 1923. He then diversified into songwriting, working with lyricists including Henry Creamer and Andy Razaf. Waters recorded several more J. C. Johnson songs and collaborations, including the first version of "Trav'lin All Alone", subsequently recorded by dozens of artists including Billie Holiday and Billy Eckstine. By 1928, Johnson had begun working with Fats Waller, often contributing lyrics to Waller's music. Johnson's first song with Waller was "I'm "Goin Huntin", written in 1927 and recorded by Louis Armstrong. Though according to some sources it is stated that they wrote a Broadway show, Keep Shufflin', other sources contend that it was James P. Johnson who co-wrote "Keep Shufflin" with Waller.

About this time, he also reportedly used the pseudonym Harry Burke, who was originally credited as the writer of the song "Me and My Gin", recorded in 1928 by Bessie Smith and later recorded by many artists under the title "Gin House Blues" (with the composition later often credited, apparently in error, to Fletcher Henderson). In 1929, he took part as a musician in a collaboration between Italian-American guitarist Eddie Lang and the blues guitarist Lonnie Johnson, together with King Oliver and Hoagy Carmichael, which was given the name "Blind Willie Dunn & His Gin Bottle Four" in order to disguise the inter-racial nature of the group. Among the many artists in the 20s and 30s who sang and recorded his tunes were Ella Fitzgerald, whose first three recorded songs were co-written by Johnson, Connie Boswell, Mamie Smith, Clarence Williams, and Lonnie Johnson. J.C. also had his own band, J.C. Johnson and his Five Hot Sparks and played piano on many other artists' recordings.

In 1930, he wrote a flop Broadway musical, Change Your Luck, which starred Hamtree Harrington and Alberta Hunter. He had greater success, however, in writing songs for Bessie Smith - including "Black Mountain Blues", "Haunted House Blues", and "Empty Bed Blues" (later recorded by LaVern Baker) - and for Fats Waller - including "Believe It, Beloved", "Rhythm and Romance", and "You Stayed Away Too Long". Some of his songs in this period, including two hits for the Boswell Sisters, "That's How Rhythm Was Born" and "Don't Let Your Love Go Wrong", were written in collaboration with Nat Burton and George Whiting. He also worked with Fats Waller and Andy Razaf both separately and together, the three being co-credited for one of Waller's biggest hits, "The Joint Is Jumpin'". Johnson also wrote for Chick Webb's band, which at the time featured singer Ella Fitzgerald, his compositions including "Spinnin' the Webb", "Crying My Heart Out for You", and "You Can't Be Mine (And Someone Else's Too)".

== World War II and later years ==
During World War II, Johnson volunteered as an ambulance driver for the U.S. Army. During this time, he and Andy Razaf wrote "Yankee Doodle Tan", honoring the African American soldiers of World War Two, which appeared in the movie Hit Parade of 1943. After Waller's death in 1943, Johnson moved to St. Albans, Queens. He wrote for the Ink Spots and for a time acted as their manager. In the early 1950s, he created theatrical shows including The Year Round, which played in Harlem and was notable for being one of the first shows that Brock Peters performed in (under the name of George Fisher); and, in 1953, Jazz Train. After first playing in a night club at 49th and Broadway, it was taken to London's West End, where it was retooled into a large musical review, playing the Piccadilly Theatre and two command performances for the Queen, before touring England and Europe for three years.

Johnson then moved to the village of Wurtsboro in upstate New York. In the 1970s, he enjoyed the renewed interest in his songs, which appeared in many movies and revues and were recorded by artists such as Bette Midler, Bobby Short and Della Reese. He died on February 27, 1981, at the age of 84.

In the fall of 2010, the New York Music Theater Festival presented Trav'lin, a new romantic musical featuring 20 songs written by J.C. Johnson.
