= Harry Brooks (composer) =

American jazz musician

Harry Brooks (September 20, 1895 – June 22, 1970) was an American writer of popular songs, jazz pianist and composer in the 1920s to the early 1950s.

Brooks was born in Homestead, Pennsylvania. After graduating from his hometown high school in 1914, he worked as a pianist with Pittsburgh bands (dance orchestras) and then as a staff composer for a publishing company. He is recalled mostly in the 21st century for his work with his friends Thomas "Fats" Waller and the lyricist Andy Razaf. Brooks was the composer of several hit songs including his compositions "(What Did I Do To Be So) Black and Blue", and "Ain't Misbehavin'", written with Waller and Razaf.

Also with Razaf and Waller, Brooks scored the Broadway shows Snapshots of 1921 and Connie's Hot Chocolates. He died, aged 74, in Teaneck, New Jersey.

== Published songs and music ==
All co-composed with Razaf and Waller unless otherwise marked

- "Ain't Misbehavin'"
- "Black and Blue"
- "Can't We Get Together"
- "Garden Of God" - sole composer
- "In the Meantime"
- "Jungle Jamboree"
- "Low Tide Down In My Heart" - with Andy Razaf
- "My Man Is Good For Nothin' But Love"
- "On the Loose" - sole composer
- "Rockin' In a Rockin' Chair"
- "Saturday"
- "Southern Sunset" (aka "When the Sun Sets Down South") - with Sidney Joseph Bechet and Noble Sissle
- "Strictly From Dixie"
- "Sweet Savannah Sue"
- "Swing, Mr. Charlie" - with Irving Taylor and J. Russell Robinson
- "That Rhythm Man"
