= Red Norvo =

American jazz mallet percussion musician (1908–1999)

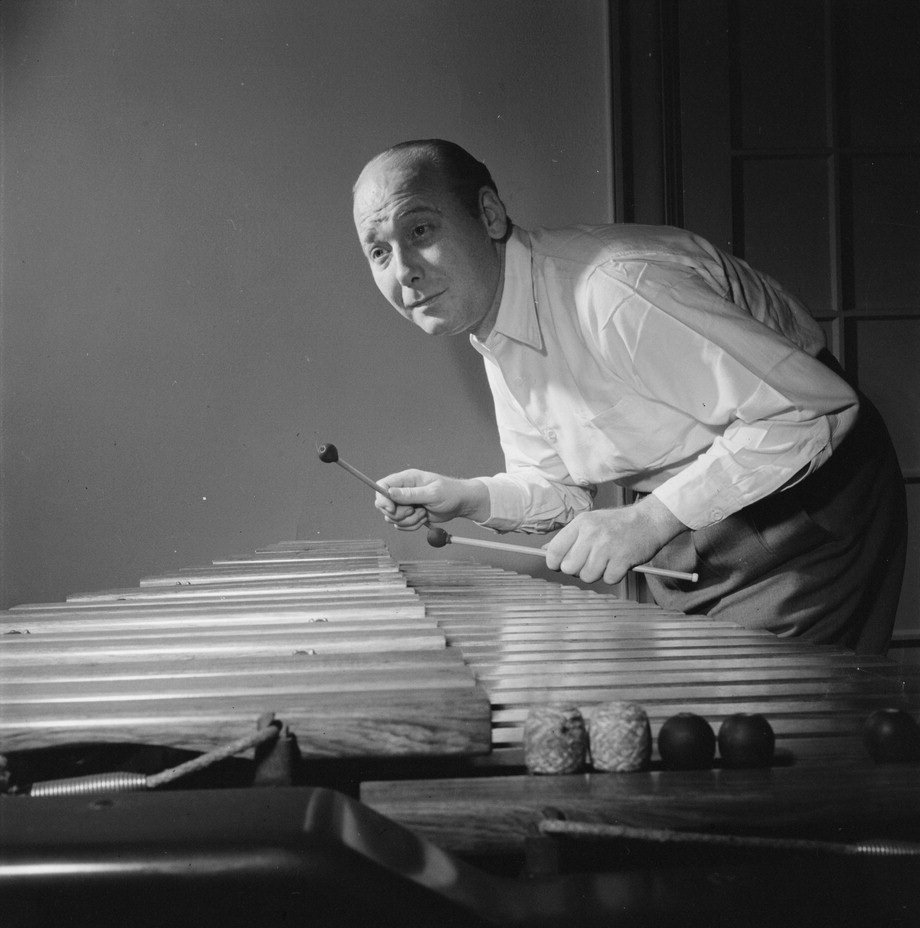
- Norvo, c. February 1947; by William P. Gottlieb

Background information
- Born: Kenneth Norville; March 31, 1908; Beardstown, Illinois, U.S.
- Died: April 6, 1999 (aged 91) Santa Monica, California, U.S.
- Genre: Jazz
- Occupations: Musician; composer
- Instruments: Vibraphone; xylophone; marimba
- Labels: Keynote; Brunswick
- Spouse: Mildred Bailey (m. 1933; div. 1942)

Red Norvo (born Kenneth Norville, March 31, 1908 – April 6, 1999) was an American musician, one of jazz's early vibraphonists, known as "Mr. Swing". He helped establish the xylophone, marimba, and vibraphone as jazz instruments. His recordings included "Dance of the Octopus", "Bughouse", "Knockin' on Wood", "Congo Blues", and "Hole in the Wall".

== Career ==
Red Norvo was born in Beardstown, Illinois, United States. His career began in Chicago with a band called "The Collegians" in 1925. He played with many other bands, including an all-marimba band on the vaudeville circuit and the bands of Paul Whiteman, Benny Goodman, Charlie Barnet, and Woody Herman. He recorded with Mildred Bailey (his wife from 1933 to 1942), Billie Holiday, Dinah Shore, and Frank Sinatra. Norvo and his wife were known as "Mr. and Mrs. Swing". He appeared as himself in the film Screaming Mimi (1958) and in Ocean's 11 (1960), accompanying Dean Martin while he sang "Ain't That a Kick in the Head?".

In 1933, Norvo recorded two sessions for Brunswick under his own name. The first, "Knockin' on Wood" and "Hole in the Wall", pleased Brunswick's recording director Jack Kapp, and Norvo was booked for another session. This time, Kapp was out of town and Norvo went ahead and recorded two early pieces of chamber jazz: "In a Mist" by Bix Beiderbecke and his own "Dance of the Octopus". He played the marimba instead of xylophone in the second session, accompanied by Benny Goodman in a rare performance on bass clarinet, Dick McDonough on guitar, and Artie Bernstein on double bass. Kapp was outraged when he heard the recordings and tore up Norvo's contract. Nevertheless, this modern record remained in print through the 1930s.

Norvo recorded eight modern swing sides for Columbia in 1934–1935, and fifteen sides for Decca and their short-lived Champion label series in 1936. Starting in 1936 through 1942, Norvo formed a swing orchestra and recorded for ARC, first on their Brunswick label, then Vocalion and Columbia after CBS bought ARC. The recordings featured arrangements by Eddie Sauter, often with Mildred Bailey as vocalist. In 1938, Red Norvo and His Orchestra reached number one with their recordings of "Please Be Kind", which was number one for two weeks, and "Says My Heart", with lead vocals by Bailey, which was number one for four weeks on the pop charts, reaching number one during the week of June 18, 1938.

In June 1945, while a member of the Benny Goodman Sextet, he recorded a session for Comet Records employing members of Goodman's group, as well as Charlie Parker, and Dizzy Gillespie. About the session Norvo said: "Bird and Diz were dirty words for musicians of my generation. But jazz had always gone through changes and in 1945 we were in the middle of another one. Bird and Diz were saying new things in an exciting way. I had a free hand, so I gambled".

In 1949, while trying to find work near home on the West Coast and running into difficulties with large groups, Norvo formed a trio with the novel combination of vibes, guitar, and bass. When the original guitarist and bassist quit (Mundell Lowe and Red Kelly), he brought in two previously little-known players. Tal Farlow became one of the most significant of the new generation of guitarists, in part because the demands of the trio led him to explore changes in tempo and harmony. Charles Mingus's career as a bass player developed via this group through his virtuoso musicianship, though its repertoire was unconnected to his later career. Mingus left in 1951 after he was replaced by a white musician in preparation for a television appearance. Red Mitchell replaced him. Farlow left the group in 1953 and guitarist Jimmy Raney took his place. The Norvo, Farlow, and Mingus trio recorded two albums for Savoy Records.

In 1959, Norvo's group played concerts in Australia with Frank Sinatra; Blue Note released these recordings in 1997. Norvo and his group also made several appearances on The Dinah Shore Chevy Show in the late 1950s and early '60s.

Norvo recorded and toured throughout his career until a stroke in the mid-1980s forced him into retirement (although he developed hearing problems long before his stroke). He died at a convalescent home in Santa Monica, California at the age of 91.

== Compositions ==
Red Norvo composed the following instrumentals during his career: "Dance of the Octopus", "Bughouse" with Irving Mills and Teddy Wilson, "The Night is Blue", "A Cigarette and a Silhouette", "Congo Blues", "Seein' Red", "Blues in E Flat", "Hole in the Wall", "Knockin' on Wood", "Decca Stomp", "Tomboy", and "1-2-3-4 Jump".

== Discography ==
- The Chronological 1933–36 (Classics)
- The Chronological 1937–38 (Classics)
- The Chronological 1938–39 (Classics)
- The Chronological 1939–43 (Classics)
- The Chronological 1943–44 (Classics)
- The Chronological 1944–45 (Classics)
- The Chronological 1945–47 (Classics)
- The Chronological 1950–51 (Classics)
- Red Norvo Improvisations (Keynote, 1944)
- Red Norvo's Fabulous Jazz Session (Dial, 1945 [1951])
- Move! (Savoy, 1950) – trio with Tal Farlow and Charles Mingus
- The Red Norvo Trios (Fantasy, 1953–55)
- Just A Mood (RCA Bluebird, 1954–55)
- Red Norvo with Strings (Fantasy, 1955)
- Vibe-Rations in Hi-Fi (Liberty, 1956)
- Midnight on Cloud 69 (Savoy, 1956)
- Music to Listen to Red Norvo By (Contemporary, 1957)
- Hi-Five (RCA Victor, 1957)
- Ad Lib with Buddy Collette (Liberty, 1957)
- Some of My Favorites (RCA, 1957)
- Naturally! (1957)
- The Forward Look (Reference Recordings, 1957)
- Red Plays the Blues (RCA Victor, 1958)
- Red Norvo in Hi-Fi (RCA Victor, 1958) (the Stereo Version Titled Red Norvo in Stereo)
- Windjammer City Style (Dot, 1958)
- The Red Norvo Quintet (Studio West, 1962)
- Pretty Is the Only Way to Fly (Charlie Parker, 1962)
- Rose Room (Byg, 1969)
- Vibes a la Red (Famous Door, 1974-75)
- The Second Time Around (Famous Door, 1975)
- Red In New York (Famous Door, 1977)
- Live at Rick's Cafe (Flying Fish, 1979)
- Red and Ross (Concord Jazz, 1979)
- Just Friends (Stash, 1983)

== Filmography ==
Year	Title	Role	Notes
1947	Hit Parade of 1947	Xylophonist	Uncredited
1951	Disc Jockey	Himself	
1951	Texas Carnival	Himself	Uncredited
1958	Screaming Mimi	Red Yost	
1958	Kings Go Forth	Jazz Musician: Vibraphone	Uncredited
1960	Ocean's 11	Himself	Uncredited (final film role)
