= Herman Autrey =

American jazz trumpeter (1904–1980)

Herman Autrey (December 4, 1904 – June 14, 1980) was an American jazz trumpeter.

== Career ==
Autrey was born into a musical family in Evergreen, Alabama, United States. He played alto horn before taking up trumpet as a teenager and performing locally in Pittsburgh and Florida. After some time in Florida he worked in Washington, D.C., Philadelphia, and New York City, where he played with Charlie Johnson in 1933. He became well known through Fats Waller, who hired him in 1934 after signing a contract with Victor Records. He played with the drummer Harry Dial, guitarist Al Casey, and reedist Gene Sedric. Autrey went on to record extensively with Waller, Fletcher Henderson, and Claude Hopkins.

Autrey worked as a sideman into the 1940s with Stuff Smith, Sammy Price, and Una Mae Carlisle. He ensembles which sometimes included pianist Herbie Nichols. Early in the 1950s Autrey was hurt in a car crash, sidelining his career for one year. He played with Saints & Sinners in the 1960s, including on their 1968/69 tours of Europe. In 1969, he played with Buzzy Drootin's Jazz Family, which included Benny Morton, Herb Hall, pianist Sonny Drootin, bassist Eddie Gibbs and. In the 1970s, he began to lose his playing capacity and spent more time as a vocalist.

Herman Autrey died in June 1980 in New York, at the age of 75.

== Discography ==
- Buster Bailey, All About Memphis (Felsted, 1958)
- Bud Freeman, All Star Swing Sessions (Prestige, 2003)
- Saints & Sinners, The Saints and Sinners (77 Records, 1964)
- Fats Waller, The Joint Is Jumpin (Bluebird, 1987)
- George Wettling, George Wettling and His Windy City Seven (Stere-o-craft, 1958)
