= Connie's Inn =

Nightclub in New York City

Coordinates: 40.812802°N 73.94537°W

Connie's Inn was a Harlem, New York City, black and tan nightclub established in 1923 by Connie Immerman (né Conrad Immerman; 1893–1967) in partnership with two of his brothers, George (1884–1944) and Louie Immerman (1882–1955).

== History ==
Having immigrated from Latvia, the Immerman brothers operated a Harlem delicatessen and made their fortune as bootleggers. Their club was located at 2221 Seventh Avenue at 131st Street in a basement from 1923 until 1934. Acts performing there included Louis Armstrong, Fats Waller, Wilbur Sweatman, Peg Leg Bates, Bricktop and Fletcher Henderson. Like the Cotton Club, Connie's Inn featured African American performers but restricted its audience to whites only. Its steep cover charge of $2.50, its intimate atmosphere, and its ability to hire famous entertainers made the club unique among other New York clubs. Members of the Ziegfeld Follies, heiress Gertrude Vanderbilt, and numerous others poured in from downtown to enjoy the shows at Connie's Inn and were sometimes influential in moving their revues to Broadway. Connie Immerman was instrumental in the design and the promotion of the revues, including the famous Hot Chocolates revue. Leonard Harper became the Connie's Inn in-house producer during its glory days.

In the early 1930s, the Immermans moved Connie's Inn to a downtown location. There, they produced one of their last revues, Stars Over Broadway, which starred Billie Holiday, and featured Bessie Smith as a temporary fill-in for Holiday when she was ill.

The repeal of Prohibition and the Great Depression played roles in the closure of Connie's Inn, and the Immerman brothers were forced to obtain individual employment. With a change in ownership, Connie's Inn became Club Harlem. In April 1934, the Harlem site re-opened as the Club Ubangi and featured lesbian, gay and bisexual entertainers such as Gladys Bentley and comedian Jackie Mabley, later known as Moms Mabley.
