= Andy Razaf =

American lyricist, composer, poet, and vocalist (1895–1973)

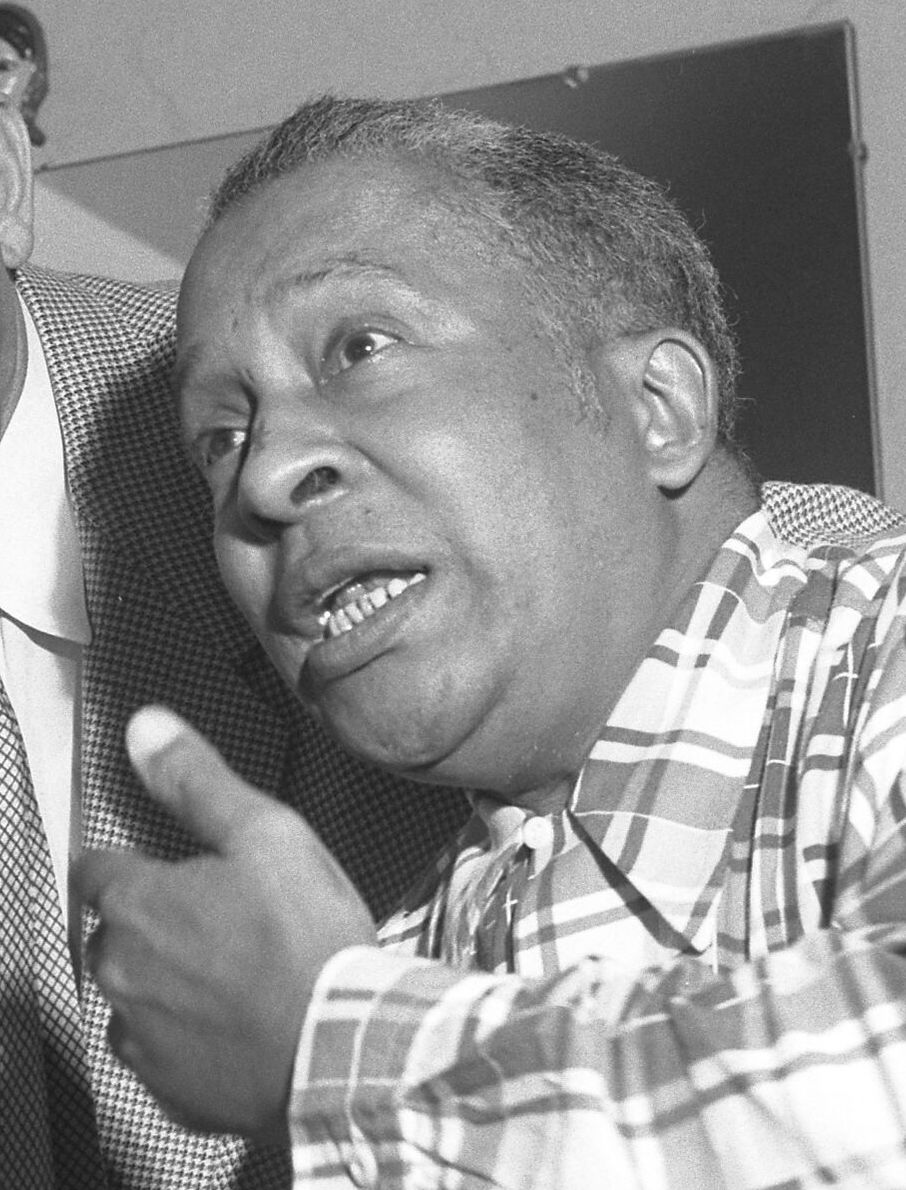
- Razaf in 1954
- Born: Andriamanantena Paul Razafinkarefo; December 16, 1895; Washington, D.C., U.S.
- Died: February 3, 1973 (aged 77); North Hollywood, Los Angeles, California, U.S.
- Occupations: Lyricist; composer; poet; vocalist
- Style: Jazz
- Spouse: Annabelle Miller (m. 1915, separated) Jean Blackwell Hutson (m. 1939; div. 1947) Dorothy Carpenter (m. 1948; div. 1960) Alicia Wilson Georgiade (m. 1963)

Andy Razaf (born Andriamanantena Paul Razafinkarefo; December 16, 1895 – February 3, 1973) was the American lyricist of such well-known songs as "Ain't Misbehavin'" and "Honeysuckle Rose". He was also a composer, poet, and vocalist.

== Biography ==
Razaf was born Andriamanantena Paul Razafinkarefo in 1895 in Washington, D.C., United States. He was the son of Henri Razafinkarefo, nephew of Queen Ranavalona III of the Imerina kingdom in Madagascar, and Jennie Razafinkarefo (née Waller), daughter of John L. Waller, the first African American consul to Imerina. The French invasion of Madagascar (1894–95) left Henri dead and forced pregnant 15-year-old Jennie to escape to the U.S. Razaf was raised in Harlem, Manhattan.

At age 16, Razaf quit school and took a job as an elevator operator in a Tin Pan Alley office building. A year later, he penned his first song text, embarking on his career as a lyricist. During this time, he spent many nights in the Greyhound Lines bus station in Times Square and picked up his mail at the Gaiety Theatre office building, which was considered the black Tin Pan Alley.

Some of Razaf's early poems were published in 1917–18 in the Hubert Harrison–edited Voice, the first newspaper of the "New Negro Movement". In the early 1920s, he was a contributor to and editor of the Universal Negro Improvement Association and African Communities League's Negro World newspaper.

Razaf's most important collaborator was Fats Waller. Among the best-known Razaf-Waller songs are "Ain't Misbehavin'", "Honeysuckle Rose", "The Joint Is Jumpin'", "Willow Tree", "Keepin' Out of Mischief Now" and "(What Did I Do to Be So) Black and Blue". Razaf also worked with other composers, including Eubie Blake, James P. Johnson, J. C. Johnson, Don Redman, and Harry Brooks. His songs were played by them and other songwriter-performers, as well as by Cab Calloway, Benny Goodman, and many other musicians. He wrote a number of raunchy "character" blues-type songs that were sung by many 1920s female blues singers.

Though primarily a lyricist, Razaf wrote both the words and the music of many songs, though none became as well known as his collaborations with other composers.

Razaf also made many recordings as a vocalist, of both his own songs and others', most in the late 1920s, as a soloist (sometimes on ukulele) and with musicians including James P. Johnson and Fletcher Henderson.

He married Annabelle Miller in 1915 but abandoned her within a few years. He was married to Jean Blackwell Hutson from 1939 to 1947, to Dorothy Carpenter from 1948 to around 1960, and to Alicia Wilson Georgiade from 1963 until his death.

In 1972, Razaf was recognized by his Tin Pan Alley peers when he was inducted in the Songwriters Hall of Fame. He died in North Hollywood, Los Angeles, in February 1973, aged 77, from kidney failure.

== Songs ==
The Songwriters Hall of Fame entry for Razaf lists 215 compositions, giving co-writers and publishers. He had many unpublished songs; Singer's biography lists over 800, published and unpublished (but without giving lyrics). Some notable lyrics include:

- "Baltimo", which he wrote at age 17, was sung by members of The Passing Show of 1913 at the Winter Garden Theatre, New York.
- "Ain't Misbehavin'"
- "Black and Blue"
- "Christopher Columbus" with Leon Berry (1936)
- "Garvey! Hats Off to Garvey"
- "Gee, Baby, Ain't I Good to You" with Don Redman (1929)
- "Honeysuckle Rose"
- "I'll Keep Sittin' on It (If I Can't Sell It)" with Alex Hill (1936)
- "In the Mood"
- "The Joint Is Jumpin'"
- "Keepin' Out of Mischief Now"
- "Louisiana"
- "Memories of You"
- "Mound Bayou", named for Mound Bayou, an independent Black community in Mississippi; the original song was sung by Maxine Sullivan and was on an album dedicated to his work, A Tribute to Andy Razaf.
- "A Porter's Love Song to a Chambermaid"
- "S'posin'"
- "Stompin' at the Savoy"
- "That's What I Like About the South"
- "UNIA"

== Recordings of his songs ==
Although Razaf's songs are found on hundreds of recordings, there are only two albums devoted exclusively to his songs:

- Maxine Sullivan, A Tribute to Andy Razaf (1956) – produced by Leonard Feather, re-issued in 2006 as My Memories of You with two additional non-Razaf tracks
- Bobby Short, Guess Who's in Town: Bobby Short Performs the Songs of Andy Razaf (1987) – re-released in 2001 in tandem with Bobby Short Loves Cole Porter.

== Poems ==
- Wired, Hired, Fired, an expression of grief and sorrow that color bars one fitted to position (that is, one otherwise qualified for, or well suited to the job, is barred on the basis of race)
- Jack Johnson, touching on defeat with honor
