= Buster Bailey =

American jazz clarinetist (1902–1967)

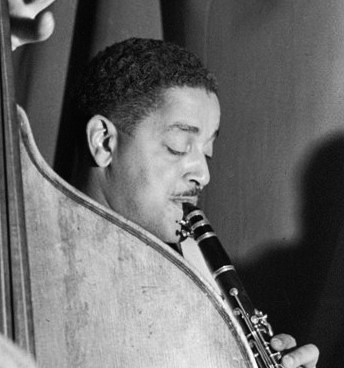
- Buster Bailey (1946)

Background information
- Birth name: William C. Bailey
- Born: July 19, 1902; Memphis, Tennessee, U.S.
- Died: August 12, 1967 (aged 65); New York City, U.S.
- Genres: Jazz, swing
- Occupation: Musician
- Instrument: Clarinet
- Years active: 1917–1967
- Formerly of: Fletcher Henderson, John Kirby, Red Allen

William C. "Buster" Bailey (July 19, 1902 – April 12, 1967) was an American jazz clarinetist.

== Career history ==
=== Early career ===
Buster Bailey was taught clarinet by classical teacher Franz Schoepp, who also taught Benny Goodman. Bailey gained his start with W.C. Handy's Orchestra in 1917, when he was just fifteen years old. After two years of touring with Handy, Bailey quit the orchestra while the band was in Chicago. In 1919, Bailey joined Erskine Tate's Vendome Orchestra and remained with Tate until 1923 when he joined up with Joe "King" Oliver. As a member of King Oliver's Creole Jazz Band, Bailey met and became friends with Louis Armstrong, who was also a member of the band at that time. In 1924, Armstrong left King Oliver's Jazz Band to join Fletcher Henderson's Orchestra in New York. Within a month, Armstrong extended an invitation for Buster Bailey to join him as a member of Henderson's band. Bailey accepted and moved to New York City.

=== Mid-career ===
In New York during the late 1920s, Buster Bailey became a highly respected sideman with Perry Bradford and others, and appeared on numerous recordings playing both the clarinet and the soprano saxophone. Bailey performed on a number of Clarence Williams recordings. In 1927, he left Fletcher Henderson and undertook a tour of Europe with Noble Sissle's Orchestra. After his return, Bailey performed with several other jazz musicians, including Edgar Hayes and Dave Nelson. He rejoined Sissle's orchestra in 1931 and continued with the group through 1933. In 1934, Bailey briefly returned to Fletcher Henderson, but by the end of the year he had settled down as a member of the John Kirby Band. Bailey remained a member of Kirby's band until 1946, but that did not stop him from performing with other artists. In 1934 and 1935, Bailey was playing with the Mills Blue Rhythm Band and, in 1937, he was a session player for Midge Williams and Her Jazz Jesters. He also recorded music during this time as Buster Bailey and His Rhythm Busters.

=== Later career ===
In 1946, Buster Bailey led his own band, but his group lasted for only the year. In 1947, he joined Wilbur de Paris and performed with him until 1949. During the early 1950s, Bailey was with Big Chief Russell Moore, but for most of the decade Bailey played with Henry "Red" Allen. From 1961 to 1963, he performed with Wild Bill Davison. Bailey was with the Saints And Sinners from 1963 to 1964, and in 1965 he rejoined Armstrong and became a member of Louis Armstrong and His All-Stars.

Buster Bailey died in April 1967 of a heart attack. He was living in Brooklyn, New York, at the time.

== Screen appearances ==
Buster Bailey appeared on film three times during his career. The first was in a film entitled That's the Spirit (1933) in which he played himself as a band member. The second was as an uncredited clarinetist in Sepia Cinderella (1947) as part of the John Kirby Sextet. His final film appearance was with Louis Armstrong in When the Boys Meet the Girls (1965), again as a musician.

He also appeared in 1958 in the DuMont TV series Jazz Party and in 1961 on the TV program The DuPont Show of the Week in an episode entitled "America's Music - Chicago and All That Jazz".

== Discography ==
=== As leader ===
- All About Memphis (Felsted, 1958)
- 1925–1940 (Classics)

=== As sideman ===
- Red Allen, Red Allen, Kid Ory & Jack Teagarden at Newport (Verve, 1957)
- Red Allen, Ride, Red, Ride in Hi-Fi (RCA Victor, 1957)
- Red Allen, Red Allen Plays King Oliver (Verve, 1961)
- Mildred Bailey, Her Greatest Performances 1929–1946 (Columbia, 1962)
- Eubie Blake, The Marches I Played On the Old Ragtime Piano (20th Fox, 1960)
- Wild Bill Davison, Swingin (Dixie Bear, 1962)
- Vic Dickenson & Joe Thomas, Mainstream (Atlantic, 1958)
- Bobby Donaldson, Dixieland New York (World Wide, 1958)
- Bobby Donaldson, Dixieland Jazz Party (Savoy, 1959)
- Leonard Gaskin, At the Jazz Band Ball (Prestige Swingville, 1962)
- Ronnie Gilbert, In Hi-Fi: The Legend of Bessie Smith (RCA Victor,, 1958)
- Jackie Gleason, Jackie Gleason Presents Lazy Lively Love (Capitol, 1960)
- Juanita Hall, The Original Bloody Mary Sings the Blues (Counterpoint, 1958)
- Fletcher Henderson, The Big Reunion (Jazztone, 1958)
- Fletcher Henderson, Swing's the Thing 1931–1934 (Decca, 1961)
- Claude Hopkins, Music of the Early Jazz Dances (20th Fox, 1958)
- Alberta Hunter & Lucille Hegamin & Victoria Spivey, Songs We Taught Your Mother (Prestige Bluesville, 1962)
- Henry Jerome, Strings in Dixieland (Decca, 1962)
- Odetta, Sometimes I Feel Like Cryin (RCA Victor, 1962)
- Jimmy Rushing, Bessie Clara Mamie & Trixie (Columbia, 1961)
- Clarence Williams, 1935 (Almac, 1960)

== Filmography ==
| Year | Title | Role | Notes |
|---|---|---|---|
| 1947 | Sepia Cinderella | Clarinettist - John Kirby Sextet | Uncredited |
| 1961 | Splendor in the Grass | Musician | Uncredited |
| 1965 | When the Boys Meet the Girls | Clarinetist with Louis Armstrong | Uncredited, (final film role) |

== Resources ==
- Kernfeld, Barry, ed. The New Grove Dictionary of Jazz, vol. 1. London: Macmillan Publishers, Ltd., 2002.
- Larkin, Colin, ed. The Encyclopedia of Popular Music, vol. 1. London: Macmillan Reference, Ltd., 1998.
- Panassie-Gautier, Dictionnaire du Jazz, 1972
