= Cedric Wallace =

American jazz bassist (1909–1985)

Cedric Wallace (August 3, 1909 in Miami, Florida – August 19, 1985 in New York City) was an American jazz double-bassist.

Wallace moved to New York City in the 1930s, where he played in a band led by Reggie Johnson at the Saratoga Club. Later in the decade, he worked with Jimmie Lunceford before joining Fats Waller's band in 1938, which he was a member of until 1942, the association for which he is best known. Wallace played with Waller at the peak of his popularity and plays on many of his biggest hits. He also recorded with Una Mae Carlisle, Maxine Sullivan, Champion Jack Dupree, Pat Flowers, Gene Sedric, and Dean Martin. He led his own ensemble in New York in the 1940s which featured Eddie Gibbs on bass for a time, and continued to perform into the 1970s.
