= Grachan Moncur II =

American jazz musician (1915–1996)

- Born: September 2, 1915; Miami, Florida, U.S.
- Died: November 3, 1996 (aged 81) Miami, Florida, U.S.
- Genres: Jazz
- Occupation: Musician
- Instruments: Double bass
- Formerly of: Savoy Sultans

Grachan Moncur II (sometimes credited as Grachan Moncur, born September 2, 1915 – November 3, 1996) was an American jazz bassist with the Savoy Sultans.

== Early life ==
Moncur was a multi-instrumentalist as a teenager, learning trombone, tuba, and double bass while growing up in Miami.

== Career ==
After moving to Newark, New Jersey, Moncur began playing bass on a local radio station, where John Hammond heard him. Hammond brought Moncur in for studio sessions in 1935–36 with Mildred Bailey, Bunny Berigan, Putney Dandridge, Bud Freeman, and Teddy Wilson. He was a founding member of the Savoy Sultans, playing with the group until 1945. Later in the 1940s, he worked with Ike Quebec and Ace Harris. His discography roster also showed he played sessions with baritone and bass saxophones in various 1930s and 1940s recordings.

Moncur returned to Miami in the 1950s, where he remained active until late in the 1960s.

== Personal life ==
Moncur was the half-brother of Al Cooper and the father of jazz trombonist Grachan Moncur III.
