= Ain't Misbehavin' (song) =

1929 song by Fats Waller, Harry Brooks, and Andy Razaf

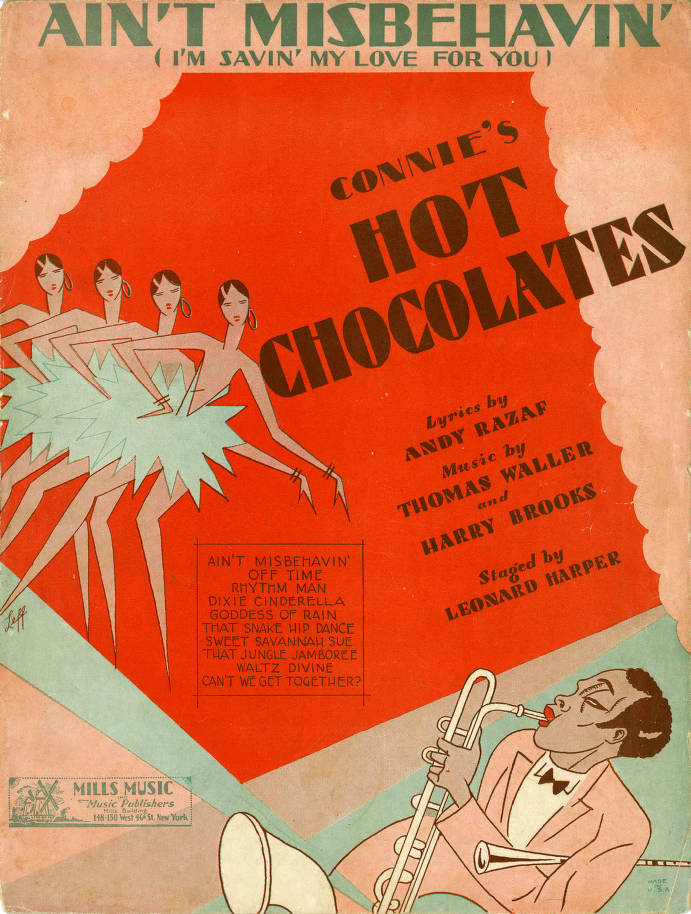
- Sheet music cover, 1929

Single by Leo Reisman and His Orchestra with Lew Conrad
- A-side: "Moanin' Low"
- Released: 1929
- Recorded: New York City, July 9, 1929
- Genre: Stride jazz; early swing
- Label: Victor
- Songwriters: Andy Razaf; Fats Waller; Harry Brooks

Audio sample
- Creative Commons recording of "Ain't Misbehavin'" (2020): file; help

"Ain't Misbehavin'" is a 1929 song in the stride piano and early swing style. Andy Razaf wrote the lyrics to a score by Thomas "Fats" Waller and Harry Brooks for the Broadway musical comedy play Connie's Hot Chocolates. It was published by Mills Music.

As a work from 1929 with its copyright renewed, it entered the American public domain on January 1, 2025. (Note: Under R173947) In June 2026, CBS News included the song in its list of the 250 essential American songs of the past 250 years.

== Composition ==
The original sheet music for "Ain't Misbehavin'" is written in the key of E-flat major.

== First performances ==
The song was first performed at the premiere of Connie's Hot Chocolates in Harlem at Connie's Inn as an opening song by Paul Bass and Margaret Simms, and repeated later in the musical by Russell Wooding's Hallelujah Singers. Connie's Hot Chocolates was transferred to the Hudson Theatre on Broadway in June 1929, where it was renamed to Hot Chocolates and where Louis Armstrong became the orchestra director. The script also required Armstrong to play "Ain't Misbehavin'" in a trumpet solo, and although this was initially slated only to be a reprise of the opening song, Armstrong's performance was so well received that the trumpeter was asked to climb out of the orchestra pit and play the piece on stage. As noted by Thomas Brothers in his book Louis Armstrong: Master of Modernism, Armstrong was first taught "Ain't Misbehavin'" by Waller himself, "woodshedding" it until he could "play all around it"; he cherished it "because it was 'one of those songs you could cut loose and swing with.'"

== Recordings ==
During the first half of the 20th century, when a tune was successful in terms of sheet music sold, it was typically recorded by several different artists. All six "Ain't Misbehavin'" recordings of 1929 were successes in the American Society of Composers, Authors and Publishers (ASCAP) rankings for that year:

- Leo Reisman and his orchestra (with vocals by Lew Conrad, No. 2).
- Louis Armstrong (No. 7).
- Bill Robinson (with Irving Mills & his Hotsy Totsy Gang, No. 8).
- Gene Austin (with Leonard Joy & his orchestra, No. 9).
- Ruth Etting (No. 16).
- Fats Waller (instrumental version, No. 17).

Waller re-recorded the song with vocals for the 1943 movie Stormy Weather. Waller's recording received the Grammy Hall of Fame Award in 1984. In 2001, it was one of 365 Songs of the Century selected by the RIAA, and it was one of fifty recordings selected for inclusion in the National Recording Registry by the Library of Congress in 2004.

"Ain't Misbehavin'" has been recorded by many other performers over the years. Johnnie Ray's version scored No. 17 in the UK Singles Chart in May 1956. In 1960, Tommy Bruce and the Bruisers had a number 3 hit in the UK Singles Chart with their cover version of the song. In 1976, Leon Redbone performed the song on Saturday Night Live.

It served as the title song of the successful 1978 musical Ain't Misbehavin'. Country music artist Hank Williams Jr. recorded a version for his 1985 studio album Five-O. Released as a single, the song peaked at No. 1 on Billboard's Hot Country Singles chart and earned Williams a Grammy Award nomination for Best Country Vocal Performance, Male.

== Use in film, television and video games ==
- 1943: Stormy Weather, performed by Fats Waller.
- 1944: Atlantic City, sung by Louis Armstrong.
- 1948: You Were Meant for Me
- 1955: Gentlemen Marry Brunettes, performed by Alan Young, Jane Russell, Jeanne Crain (dubbed by Anita Ellis) and Chorus, with choreography.
- 1975: Lucky Lady, performed by Burt Reynolds.
- 1997: Ain't Misbehavin', performed by Robson Green and Jerome Flynn.
- 2013: An instrumental version is heard in Baz Luhrmann's The Great Gatsby. The film is set in 1922, seven years before the song was written, making its appearance anachronistic.
- 2018: The song is played on the in-game radio station of Appalachia Radio within the game of Fallout 76.
- 2025: The song is sung in the Ghosts episode "The Batcholorette Party", where Alberta uses the song to inform her descendant, Alcia that her partner wasn't cheating, like Alica thought. The two then sing the song, even though they are on different planes of existence.

== See also ==
- List of 1920s jazz standards
