= Dave Martin (jazz musician) =

American musician (1907–1975)

Dave Martin (1907–1975) was an American jazz musician. He was a New York-based bandleader of the 1940s and 1950s.
