= Al Cooper =

American jazz musician (1911–1981)

- Born: Lofton Alfonso Cooper; 1911
- Died: October 5, 1981 (aged 69–70) New York City, U.S.
- Genres: Jazz, big band, swing
- Occupation: Musician
- Instruments: Saxophone, clarinet
- Formerly of: Savoy Sultans

Lofton Alfonso Cooper (1911 – October 5, 1981) was an American jazz saxophonist and clarinetist. He founded the Savoy Sultans and was their leader from 1937 to 1946. He was the half-brother of Grachan Moncur II.
