= Fats Waller =

American jazz pianist and composer (1904–1943)

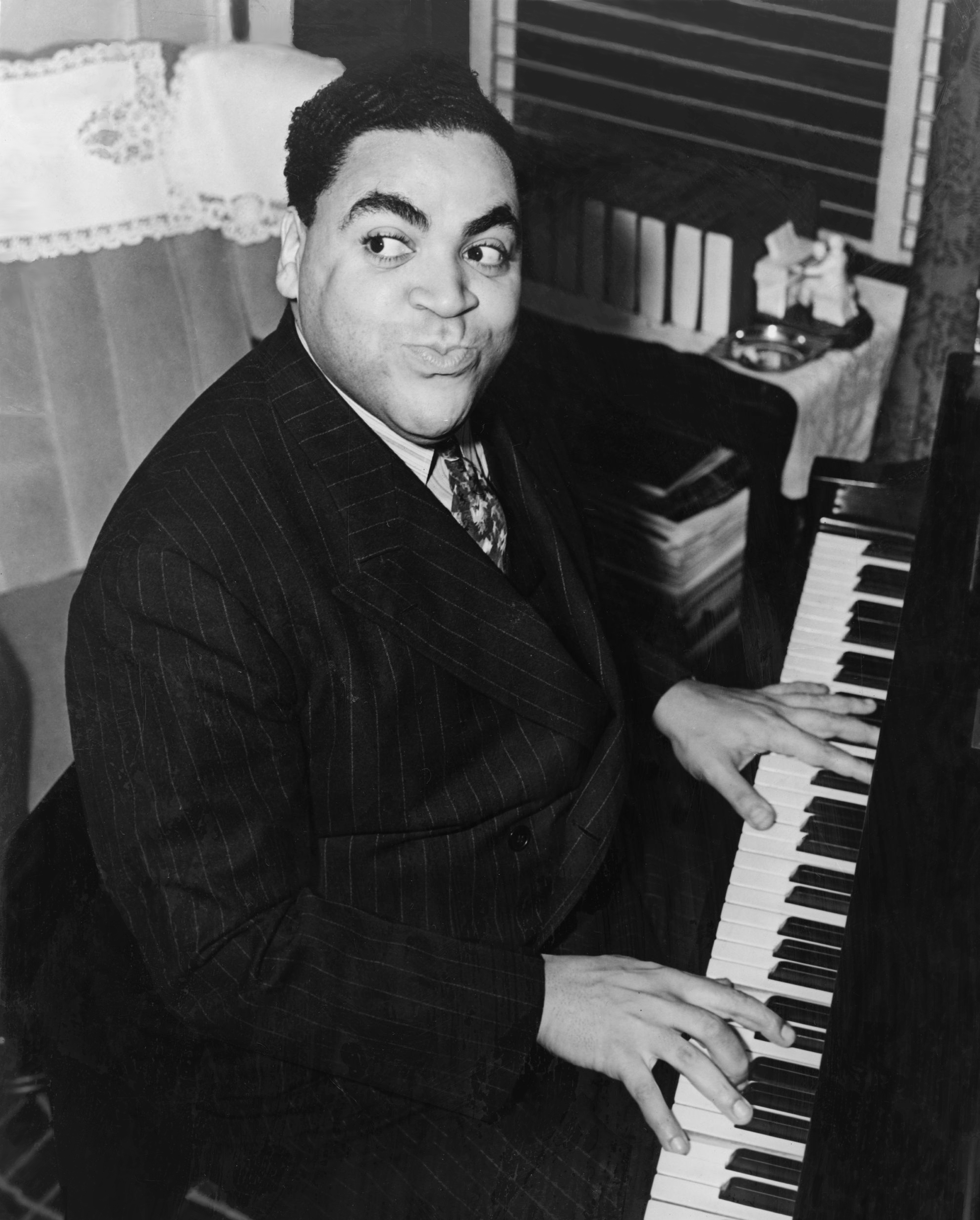
- Waller in 1938
- Born: Thomas Wright Waller; May 21, 1904; New York City, U.S.
- Died: December 15, 1943 (aged 39); Kansas City, Missouri, U.S.
- Occupations: Musician; composer; singer
- Years active: 1918–1943
- Spouses: Edith Hatch (m. 1920; div. 1923); Anita Rutherford (m. 1926)
- Children: 3
- Relatives: Darren Waller (great-grandson)
- Musical career
- Genres: Jazz; stride
- Instruments: Piano; organ; vocals

Thomas Wright "Fats" Waller (May 21, 1904 – December 15, 1943) was an American jazz pianist, organist, composer, and singer. His innovations in the stride style were widely influential among musicians. A popular performer in the Jazz Age and swing era, he toured internationally, achieving critical and commercial success in the United States and Europe. His best-known songs, "Ain't Misbehavin'" and "Honeysuckle Rose", were inducted into the Grammy Hall of Fame in 1984 and 1999, respectively.

Waller was based mainly in New York City and grew up under the influence of the Harlem Renaissance. He composed hundreds of songs, many of them uncredited, as he would frequently sell the rights to a new composition to get an immediate cash sum. His recording career spanned two decades and produced hundreds of recordings, with his solo output of particular interest to critics. He developed a distinctive performance style, wherein he performed risqué patter, witty asides, and amusing facial expressions while playing a piece. This proved popular on radio, as well as in the nightclubs and theater venues he performed in throughout his career. He was involved in several successful musical theatre ventures and developed an interest in classical music toward the end of his life, hoping to encourage audiences to take jazz as seriously as they did classical performances.

== Early life ==
Thomas Wright Waller was born in New York City on May 21, 1904, the seventh child of eleven (five of whom survived childhood). (Note: Some sources suggest that there were twelve children; the figure of eleven is taken from the account of Waller's son, itself used by Shipton (2002).) His parents were Adeline Waller (née Lockett), a musician, and Edward Martin Waller, a Baptist lay preacher and teamster; they originated from rural Virginia but moved to New York after marrying at the age of 16 in the hope of better employment, housing, and education prospects. Thomas Waller began playing the piano at the age of six and later played the reed organ at his father's open-air services. He also studied the double bass and violin, paying for music lessons by working in a grocery store. From an early age, he proved adept at playing by ear, and was inspired by hearing Ignacy Jan Paderewski perform at Carnegie Hall. The nickname "Fats" dates from around this time, on account of his being overweight, although during his career, he only tended to use it as a stage name.

Waller's mother, Adeline, developed diabetes, which made her weak; consequently, the family moved to an apartment with fewer stairs, in central Harlem. The post–World War I period saw Harlem become populated with bars and clubs which featured live music, fueling Waller's artistic aspirations. Waller attended DeWitt Clinton High School for a short period of time (Note: Sources say either one semester or one year.) but left to pursue his ambition to become a professional musician. He briefly worked polishing jewel boxes and delivering illicit alcoholic drinks during prohibition, with the wages allowing him to afford piano lessons, and at the age of 15, he became an organist at the Lincoln Theatre, where he earned $23 a week. (Note: Also reported as $32 a week.) This position allowed him to practice his stagecraft and improvisation.

Edward Waller disapproved of his son's career in music due to his strict religious beliefs, which was a continual source of tension between them. Adeline Waller, who encouraged his aspirations, acted as a mediating influence, but she died on November 10, 1920, from a stroke due to her diabetes. Shortly thereafter, Waller moved out to live with a friend, who was acquainted with pianist James P. Johnson, a leading figure of the burgeoning Harlem stride style. Waller met Johnson at the age of 16, and Johnson began to teach him the piano and introduce him to important figures on the Harlem music scene, such as Eubie Blake, Willie Gant, Cliff Jackson, Duke Ellington, and Willie "the Lion" Smith, bringing him to rent parties where they would perform. Johnson continued to be a friend and mentor throughout Waller's life.

== Career ==
=== Early career ===
"You Got Everything a Sweet Mama Needs But Me"
"You Got Everything a Sweet Mama Needs But Me", sung by Sara Martin with piano accompaniment by Waller (1922)

"'Tain't Nobody's Bus'ness If I Do"
"'Tain't Nobody's Bus'ness if I Do", sung by Sara Martin with piano accompaniment by Waller (1922)

In 1921, (Note: Or 1923) Waller was invited to accompany the vaudeville group Liza and Her Shufflin' Six on a tour of the Northeastern U.S., having impressed Liza with his organ playing at the Lincoln Theatre. While in Boston, he met Count Basie, who asked for organ lessons – these took place back in New York, at the Lincoln. After his return, Waller played his first rent party, having improved dramatically from practice and his lessons with James P. Johnson, and he continued to perform at these, as well as undertake short-term contracts at nightclubs and cabarets. Waller's steady job at the Lincoln Theatre transferred to the Lafayette Theatre after a change of management.

From early in his career, Waller displayed an aptitude for risqué patter. A song named "The Boy in a Boat" contributed to his popularity on the rent party circuit and was a veiled reference to clitoral stimulation. The song was later recorded with different lyrics as "Squeeze Me", but retained "A Boy in a Boat" as a subtitle on the 1926 piano roll publication. Waller also showed an inclination to drink large amounts of alcohol from the age of around 17 or 18, a habit which would last the rest of his life.

Waller continued to accompany blues singers in recordings, play rent parties, and perform at nightclubs, gaining exposure. During this period, he met Andy Razaf, a lyricist with whom he collaborated extensively and who encouraged him to sing as well as play the piano. He met J. C. Johnson in 1923 and began collaborating with him as well. Waller became known for his prolific output of catchy songs, although did not copyright any of those he wrote during this period, instead selling them outright to publishers or performing them without getting them published.

=== Recordings ===
Through his friend Clarence Williams, a Tin Pan Alley music publisher, Waller became involved with the new recording label OKeh Records in 1922. He was originally slated to accompany Sara Martin on "Sugar Blues" but failed to attend the recording session; Williams played instead, which launched his own performing career. Williams convinced Fred Hager, the head of artists and repertoire for OKeh, to try Waller again, and his first recordings were "Muscle Shoals Blues" and "Birmingham Blues" in late 1922. (Note: Sources suggest either October 21 or December 1922.) In December, he accompanied Martin on "Mama's Got the Blues" and "Last Go Round Blues". James P. Johnson got Waller work recording piano rolls for QRS, the first of which was "Got to Cool My Doggies Now", recorded in March 1923. In the summer of that year, Waller began composing original pieces, his first being "Wildcat Blues", with lyrics by Williams. The pair collaborated on over 70 songs during the subsequent five years, including "Squeeze Me".

In 1926, Waller began his association with the Victor Talking Machine Company (later RCA Victor) after being contacted by Ralph Peer. On November 17, 1926, he recorded "St. Louis Blues" and his composition "Lenox Avenue Blues", his first solo recordings, and on December 1, 1927, he recorded "Red Hot Dan" with Thomas Morris, the first recording of Waller singing. 1929 saw the composition of some of Waller's most highly regarded songs, such as "Ain't Misbehavin'", "I've Got a Feeling I'm Falling", "Honeysuckle Rose", and "Black and Blue". To avoid having to pay more in child support to his former wife, Edith, whom he had divorced in 1923, Waller sold the rights for twenty of his songs (including "Ain't Misbehavin'") to Irving Mills for $500. This was a small fraction of their value. As a consequence, he earned only the musician's share of the royalties from the subsequent recordings.

The Great Depression caused a sustained slump in record sales, and Waller participated in only six recording sessions between January 1930 and May 1934, as opposed to the fifteen he had done in 1929. He turned his attention to developing his radio career from December 1930, when he featured on a new show for CBS playing the piano and, unusually until this point, singing. Joe Davis, who had become Waller's publisher and manager after the sale of his material to Irving Mills, began to market Waller as a singer as well as a pianist, and he recorded the solo songs "I'm Crazy about My Baby" and "Draggin' My Heart Around" on March 31, 1931.

=== Musical theatre ===
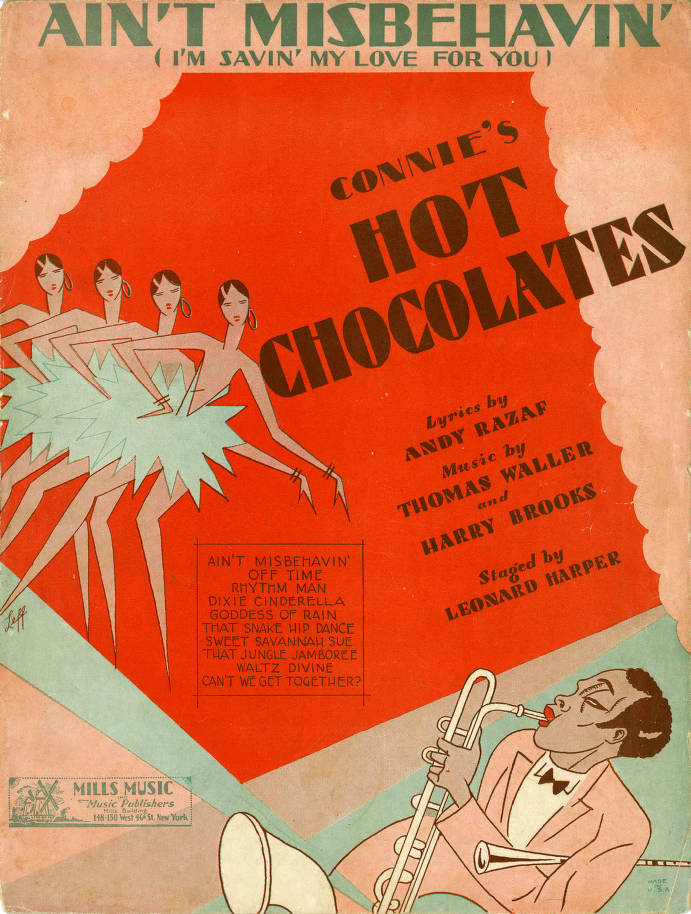
Sheet music cover to "Ain't Misbehavin'" (1929)

The latter half of the 1920s saw Waller's only involvement in musical theatre until he started working on the musical Early to Bed shortly before his death in 1943. In 1926, he composed for two revues with Spencer Williams: Tan Town Topics and Junior Blackbirds, both performed at the Lafayette Theatre. The same year, Waller performed in productions named Creole Follies (at the Lafayette) and Signor Fats Waller's Lincolnians (at the Lincoln Theatre).

Waller's first highly successful stage endeavor was the revue Keep Shufflin', which featured the comedians Flournoy Miller and Aubrey Lyles as a follow-on from their 1921 show Shuffle Along. Around half of the songs were composed by Waller and Razaf, with the others by Henry Creamer, Clarence Todd, and James P. Johnson. The show opened in February 1928 at the Standard Theatre in Philadelphia before transferring after a two-week run to Daly's 63rd Street Theatre on Broadway, and subsequently the more prestigious Eltinge 42nd Street Theatre in April. After its run there, Waller accompanied the rest of the band on tour until June 1928, at which point he traveled to Philadelphia to take a short-term position as organist at the Royal Grand Theater.

1929 saw the premieres of two further revues: Load of Coal, which featured "Honeysuckle Rose", and Hot Chocolates, which featured "Ain't Misbehavin'", both among Waller's best-known songs. Both revues were performed at Connie's Inn, a nightclub next to the Lafayette, where Waller had occasionally performed both as a soloist and with the house band. Hot Chocolates was a success and moved to the Windsor Theatre and then the Hudson Theatre on Broadway, where it ran for 219 performances and received glowing reviews, with "Ain't Misbehavin'" receiving particular praise.

=== Radio ===
In the early 1930s, Waller began to play regularly at the Hot Feet Club, where he developed his storytelling asides and style as a raconteur: "the cocked eye brow, the finger punctuating the air for emphasis, and eyes rolling heavenward whenever he said something blue". In the summer of 1931, he visited Paris with Spencer Williams, playing in the city's nightclubs and enjoying the much lower levels of racial discrimination and the absence of prohibition. Davis appointed Marty Bloom as Waller's manager after Waller's return, but Bloom resigned the position shortly thereafter and it was taken by Phil Ponce, a "proper manager" who was experienced in show business and had established and managed the the Ponce Sisters.

Ponce decided to focus on Waller's radio career, securing him a two-year contract with WLW in Cincinnati, where he was given his own program: Fats Waller's Rhythm Club. Waller adapted his nightclub performance style to radio, including risqué patter, witty asides, and comical accents alongside the music. Waller also played for WLW's show Moon River but was not credited due to his own show's "raucous and comedic reputation". After the contract ended in late 1933, Waller moved back to New York. A sequence of CBS radio performances in March and April 1934 provided extensive publicity and led to his own regular show, The Rhythm Club, as well as regular appearances on other CBS programs.

=== Fats Waller and His Rhythm ===
This radio success led to RCA Victor offering him a recording contract, assuming that the records would sell well in the black community, but they unexpectedly proved to have wide appeal and became bestsellers. Victor arranged for tours for Waller and a group of musicians as "Fats Waller and His Rhythm" in 1935, (Note: The lineup of Fats Waller and His Rhythm changed frequently throughout its existence and included at various points Gene Sedric, Billy Taylor, Floyd O'Brien, Mezz Mezzrow, Bill Coleman, Rudy Powell, Herman Autrey, Yank Porter, Slick Jones, Cedric Wallace, John "Bugs" Hamilton, and Arthur Trappier.) and while back in New York during breaks between fixtures, the group recorded a number of songs, the most popular of which was "I'm Gonna Sit Right Down and Write Myself a Letter". Part of the tour involved promoting the release of the film Hooray for Love, in which Waller had appeared earlier that year, and the success of this publicity activity led to him featuring in King of Burlesque.

The band continued to tour and record until 1942, (Note: The band did not constitute a full-time commitment for its members but "was formed for several months of most years".) but Waller's drinking became heavier and his behavior more erratic, and interest from promoters declined after a racially-motivated boycott led to poorly-attended events in South Carolina and Florida in 1937. They recorded "Squeeze Me" and "Your Feet's Too Big" in 1939, and their final recording was in 1942, after which the 1942–1944 musicians' strike prevented any further sessions before Waller's death.

=== British and Scandinavian tours ===
Ed Kirkeby had taken over as Waller's manager in 1935 due to Ponce's ill health. By 1938, Waller's marketability had begun to decline: "he had had a particularly bad string of one-night engagements, and had exhausted the theater circuit." Touring Europe was an established way for American jazz artists to make money from performances and improve record sales in a part of the world where jazz was increasing in popularity, although, due to restrictions imposed by the English Musicians' Union, soloists would front local bands on tour instead of bringing their own. Accordingly, Kirkeby arranged a solo tour of Britain and Scandinavia.

Waller's fixtures in Britain were generally part of a variety show, mostly in theaters run by the Moss Empires group. He landed in Glasgow on July 29, 1938, and his performance at the Glasgow Empire Theatre was very well received. He went on to appear for two weeks at the London Palladium, which drew wider public attention, and then at various other Empire theatres. Waller spent most of September in Scandinavia, returning to England on the 28th, and returned to New York on October 1st.

The tour was a great success, with Waller recording for HMV, RCA Victor's British affiliate, and appearing on the new medium of television in addition to his well-received live performances. He found his tour audiences to be more discerning than those in America: "Throughout the British Isles and Scandinavia, audiences like to listen ... I never saw such an intelligent appreciation of swing. After one concert I gave in Sweden a chap came up to me and said 'what did you play in that 17th bar of the 4th chorus?' He killed me, but it's typical of the response you get." Waller returned to Britain in March 1939 and played in cities across England and in Glasgow and Edinburgh, leaving in June. Reviews of these fixtures were mixed, generally airing the opinion that his exaggerated facial expressions and vocal patter came at the expense of his piano playing. Nevertheless, it solidified the popularity that his recordings had generated in Britain.

=== Late career ===
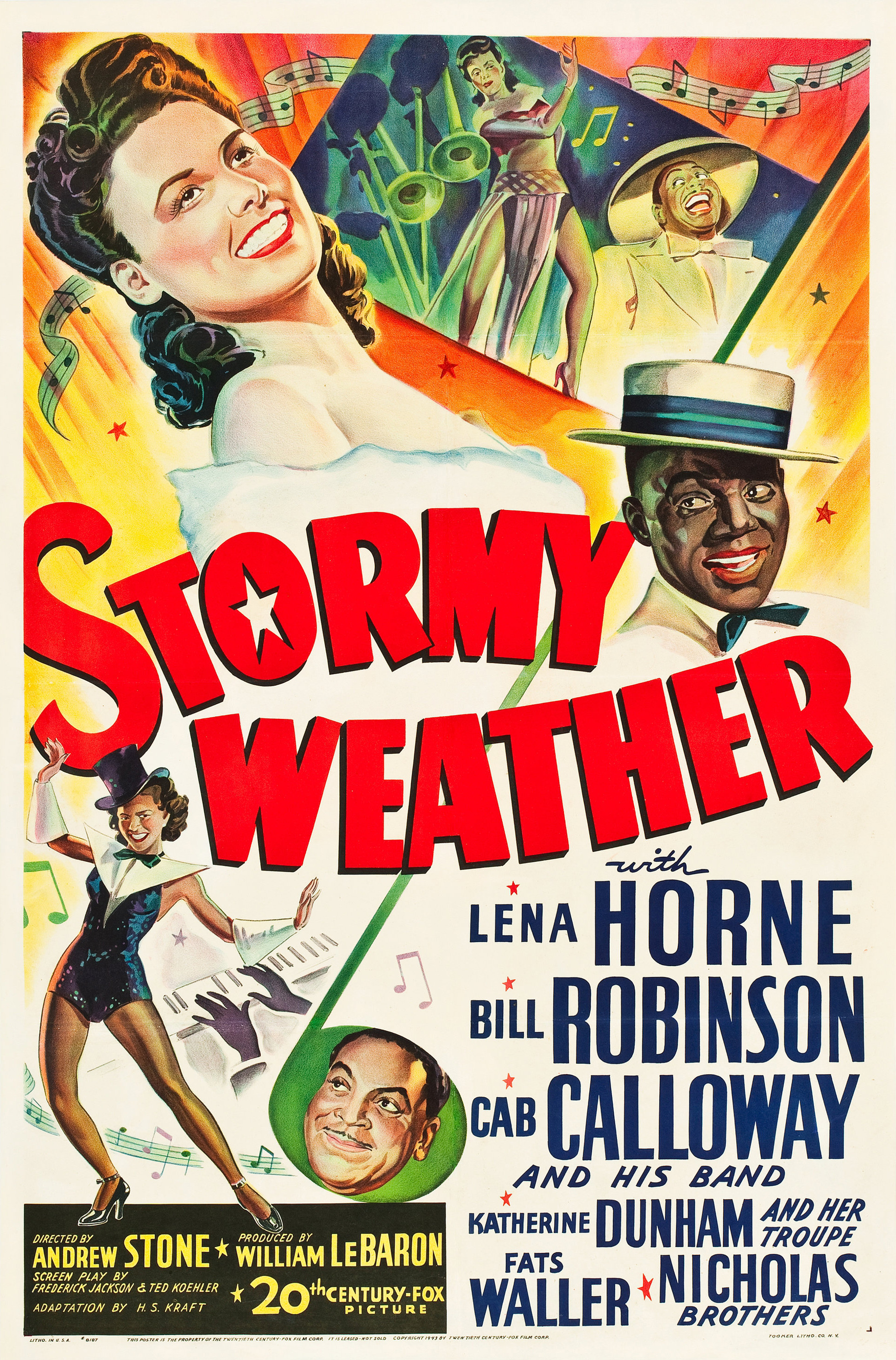
American release poster for Stormy Weather (1943)

After the European tour, Waller was in high demand as an accompanist on recordings, but the RCA Victor contract was exclusive, so he was credited as "Maurice Waller", his son's name. RCA Victor marketed Waller as a comic performer, with songs such as "You Run Your Mouth, I'll Run My Business". In 1941, he recorded four soundies – short musical films of "Ain't Misbehavin'", "Honeysuckle Rose", "Your Feet's Too Big", and "The Joint Is Jumpin'". He toured the U.S., often staging surprise concerts to entertain the troops at the local military post.

Waller had been developing his interest in composition and classical music, inspired by George Gershwin's Rhapsody in Blue and Concerto in F. He began to incorporate more classical themes into his music and took up the violin. While in London in 1939, he composed the impressionist London Suite, representing different areas of the city he had visited, and this was recorded by HMV. On January 14, 1942, he staged a concert at Carnegie Hall in an attempt to make audiences take jazz more seriously. The concert was received well by the audience, although at least one critic gave it a mixed review, possibly because Waller had become drunk during the interval.

Waller's former publisher Irving Mills had become a film producer in the intervening years and, in early 1943, engaged Waller to perform songs including "Ain't Misbehavin'" (which he owned the rights to) in the musical film Stormy Weather. Upon returning to New York, Waller began to compose for the musical Early to Bed, which premiered in Boston on May 24, 1943. It received positive reviews and was staged at the Broadhurst Theatre on Broadway on June 17. Waller was the first black composer to write a Broadway show for a white cast.

=== Compositions ===
Waller is credited with composing hundreds of songs over the course of his career. He is also believed to have composed many songs in the 1920s and sold them for immediate cash, for the songs later to be credited to other composers. The author Alyn Shipton commented that "the stories of Fats selling songs for $10 apiece, or trading them for hamburgers with Fletcher Henderson, or parting with lucrative royalty contracts for a minuscule cash advance covering a total assignment of rights, are legion, and it is virtually impossible to separate the fact from the fiction." Publishers at the time took advantage of black musicians, and in response, Waller and Razaf would often sell the same song with different lyrics to various publishers without their knowledge. Waller added a note to the program for his 1942 Carnegie Hall concert: "Some of the best of Mr. Waller's popular songs are not credited to him simply because he sold all rights to them to unscrupulous Tin Pan Alley authors." Waller's son Maurice, in his biography of his father, describes how Waller would be angry when Maurice played a song Waller had sold in this way, specifically naming "I Can't Give You Anything but Love" and "On the Sunny Side of the Street": "he explained how he had sold that tune or other tunes just for drinking money and it bothered him terribly that they had become hits."

== Personal life ==
In 1920, Waller married Edith Hatch, and they moved in with Edith's parents as they were unable to afford their own home. Edith's parents disapproved of Waller's career as a musician, considering it unfit for a newly married man. The couple found their own apartment, and Edith gave birth to a son, Thomas Waller Jr., in 1921. She was unhappy being married to a working musician, with its financial insecurity and unsociable hours, and felt that she and their son deserved more of Waller's time and attention. In 1923, they divorced, with an agreement for Waller to pay $35 per week in child support and alimony. Waller persistently failed to pay this, prompting Edith to take him to court several times, and he spent time in jail on Welfare Island. His will left her the minimum amount allowed by law, with the stipulation that this should be reduced to nothing in the event that the law change to permit this between the time of writing and his death.

Waller married Anita Rutherford, whom he knew in childhood and met again while playing at the Lincoln Theatre, in 1926. They had a son, Maurice Thomas Waller, born on September 10, 1927. In 1928, Waller and Rutherford had their second son, Ronald Waller.

In 1938, Waller was one of the first African Americans to purchase a home in the Addisleigh Park section of St. Albans, Queens, a New York City community with racially restrictive covenants. After his purchase, and litigation in the New York State courts, many prosperous African Americans followed, including many jazz artists, such as Count Basie, Lena Horne, Ella Fitzgerald, and Milt Hinton.

== Death ==
Waller's health began to decline in 1939 or 1940, with heavy alcohol drinking, working late hours, and excessive food consumption being contributing factors (he reportedly weighed about 285 pounds (129 kg) at the time of his death). He contracted influenza while playing a series of events at the Zanzibar Room in Hollywood in October 1943 but disregarded a doctor's recommendation to go to the hospital and stop drinking.

Waller died of pneumonia in the early morning of December 15, 1943, while returning to New York on the Santa Fe Chief, as the train was stopped at Kansas City Union Station. His funeral took place at Abyssinian Baptist Church in Harlem, the church his parents had joined after first moving to the city from Virginia. More than 4,200 people were estimated to have attended, which prompted Adam Clayton Powell Jr., who delivered the eulogy, to observe that Waller "always played to a packed house". Afterwards, he was cremated, and his ashes were scattered over Harlem from an airplane piloted by a World War I and Spanish Civil War pilot known as the "Black Ace".

== Legacy ==
The academic Paul Machlin notes that stories about Waller's colorful life and large personality have drawn attention away from his musical influence: "the persistent myths surrounding Waller's life – myths that magnify his affinity and capacity for high living, his conviviality, his ebullient personality, and his supposed disinclination to take his music seriously ... have overshadowed both the quality of his improvisations and the magnitude of his contributions to jazz".

Waller was the first significant jazz organist, with a notable influence on Count Basie, Milt Herth, and Glenn Hardman. His chief legacy, however, is his contributions to jazz piano, particularly in stride: "The fullness and variety of his tone are still unsurpassed, and he used a wide dynamic range to great expressive and dramatic effect. Harmonically, he sometimes added inner pitches to the customary octaves or 10ths in the left hand, producing richly voiced three-note chords; his chromatic alterations and passing notes undoubtedly influenced Art Tatum." Alyn Shipton notes that Waller's use of "backward tenths", in which the notes are played at slightly different times in order for the upper note to act as a counterpoint to the melody, was emulated by Ralph Sutton and particularly Don Ewell. Waller's solo piano pieces have garnered the most critical attention, and "Handful of Keys" in particular became a set piece for jazz pianists.

A number of musicians name Waller as an influence. Dizzy Gillespie cited his distinctive style in a 1981 interview: "I am serious about my music, but I like to have fun, too. Fats Waller always had fun, and he was my main man." Ralph Sutton was a great admirer of Waller, saying, "I've never heard a piano man swing any better than Fats – or swing a band better than he could. I never get tired of him. Fats has been with me from the first, and he'll be with me as long as I live." Other admirers include Joe Sullivan, Hank Duncan, Billy Kyle, Teddy Wilson, Johnny Guarnieri, Bobby Henderson, Dick Wellstood, Martha Davis, and Don Ewell.

Shortly after his death, in April 1944, a group of his contemporaries, including Count Basie, Lena Horne, Hazel Scott, and the reunited Rhythm band, held a memorial concert at the Town Hall, and the remaining band members continued to perform similar concerts at the Overseas Press Club on Waller's birthday. Waller's music is featured in the 1976 revue Bubbling Brown Sugar. A Broadway musical showcasing Waller tunes entitled Ain't Misbehavin' opened in 1978 and ran for 1,604 performances; it was revived in 1988 and has toured widely.

== Recognition and awards ==
Year inducted	Title
1970	Songwriters Hall of Fame
1989	Big Band and Jazz Hall of Fame
1993	Grammy Lifetime Achievement Award
2005	Jazz at Lincoln Center: Nesuhi Ertegun Jazz Hall of Fame
2008	Gennett Records Walk of Fame

Waller's recordings were inducted into the Grammy Hall of Fame, a special Grammy Award established in 1973 to honor recordings that are at least 25 years old and that have "qualitative or historical significance."

Grammy Hall of Fame Awards
Year recorded	Title	Genre	Label	Year inducted	Notes
1929	"Ain't Misbehavin'"	Jazz (single)	Victor	1984	Listed in the National Recording Registry by the Library of Congress in 2004
1934	"Honeysuckle Rose"	Jazz (single)	Victor	1999	

== Selected works ==
=== Recordings ===
Waller features in hundreds of recordings, the majority of them for RCA Victor. JSP Records released a complete collection of the known extant recordings:

- 1922–29: The Complete Recorded Works Vol. 1: Messin' Around with the Blues (JSP, 2007)[4×CD]
- 1930–34: The Complete Recorded Works Vol. 2: A Handful of Keys (JSP, 2006)[4×CD]
- 1934–36: The Complete Recorded Works Vol. 3: Rhythm and Romance (JSP, 2007)[4×CD]
- 1936–38: The Complete Recorded Works Vol. 4: New York, Chicago & Hollywood (JSP, 2007)[4×CD]
- 1938–40: The Complete Recorded Works Vol. 5: New York, London & Chicago (JSP, 2008)[4×CD]
- 1940–43: The Complete Recorded Works Vol. 6: New York, Chicago & Hollywood (JSP, 2008)[4×CD]

=== Instrumental ===
==== Solo piano ====
Title	Year
"Hog Maw Stomp"	1924
"Alligator Crawl" (renamed "House Party Stomp")	1925
"Old Folks Shuffle"	1926
"The Digah's Stomp"	1928
"Gladyse"	1929
"Valentine Stomp"	1929
"Handful of Keys"	1930
"Numb Fumblin'"	1930
"Viper's Drag"	1930
"African Ripples"	1931
"Smashing Thirds"	1931
"Clothes Line Ballet"	1934
"Functionizin'"	1935
"Bach Up to Me"	1936
"Black Raspberry Jam"	1936
"Fractious Fingering"	1936
"Lounging at the Waldorf"	1936
"Paswonky"	1936
"London Suite"	1939
"Jitterbug Waltz"	1942

==== Solo organ ====
Title	Year
"Fats Waller Stomp"	1927
"Lenox Avenue Blues"	1927
"Messin' Around with the Blues"	1927
"Sloppy Water Blues"	1927
"Soothin' Syrup Stomp"	1927

=== Songs ===
Title	Year	Lyricist(s)	Collaborator
"Wild Cat Blues"	1923		Clarence Williams
"Squeeze Me"	1923	Andy Razaf	
"Anybody Here Want to Try My Cabbage"	1924	Andy Razaf	
"In Harlem's Araby"	1924	Jo Trent	
"Georgia Bo-Bo"	1926	Jo Trent	
"Come On and Stomp, Stomp, Stomp"	1927	C. Smith, Irving Mills	
"I'm Goin' Huntin'"	1927		J. C. Johnson
"Ain't Misbehavin'"	1929	Andy Razaf	
"My Feelin's are Hurt"	1929	Andy Razaf	
"Blue Turning Grey over You"	1929	Andy Razaf	
"Honeysuckle Rose"	1929	Andy Razaf	
"My Fate is in Your Hands"	1929	Andy Razaf	
"Sweet Savannah Sue"	1929	Russell Brooks, Andy Razaf	
"What Did I Do to Be so Black and Blue"	1929	Andy Razaf	Russell Brooks
"Zonky"	1929	Andy Razaf	
"I'm Crazy 'Bout my Baby and My Baby's Crazy 'Bout Me"	1931	Alex Hill	
"How Can You Face Me"	1932	Andy Razaf	
"Keepin' Out of Mischief Now"	1932	Andy Razaf	
"Strange as it Seems"	1932	Andy Razaf	
"Ain't Cha Glad"	1933	Andy Razaf	
"You're Breakin' my Heart"	1933	Spencer Williams	
"Stealin' Apples"	1936	Andy Razaf	
"Joint is Jumpin'"	1938	Andy Razaf	
"Spider and the Fly"	1938	Andy Razaf, J. C. Johnson	
"You Can't Have Your Cake and Eat It"	1939	Spencer Williams	
"Old Grand Dad"	1940		
"All That Meat and no Potatoes"	1941	Ed Kirkeby	
"Slightly Less Than Wonderful"	1943	George F. Marion	

=== Stage ===
Title	City	Location	Date
Keep Shufflin'	Philadelphia	Gibson's Theatre	February 13, 1928
Connie's Hot Chocolates	New York	Connie's Inn	May 1929
Fireworks of 1930	New York	Lafayette Theatre	June 28, 1930
Hello 1931!	New York	The Harlem Alhambra	December 29, 1930
Early to Bed	Boston	Shubert Theatre	May 24, 1943

=== Film ===
Title	Director	Year
Hooray for Love	Walter Lang	1935
King of Burlesque	Sidney Lanfield	1936
Soundies shorts	Warren Murray	1941
Stormy Weather	Andrew L. Stone	1943

== See also ==
- Black and tan clubs
- Cotton Club, at which Fats Waller played
- A Jam Session at Victor, a 1937 jam session in which Waller participated
- Handful of Keys, an album of live performances by Fats Waller and His Rhythm
- List of people from Harlem
