= Chicago Rhythm Kings =

The Chicago Rhythm Kings was the name under which the recordings of several different jazz ensembles were issued. The earliest of these was a jazz octet consisting of vocalist Red McKenzie, cornetist Muggsy Spanier, saxophonist Frank Teschemacher, guitarist Eddie Condon, clarinetist Mezz Mezzrow, pianist Joe Sullivan, drummer Gene Krupa, and bassist and tubist Jim Lanigan. This group, who also recorded under the name the Jungle Kings, released a 1928 record for Brunswick Records as the Chicago Rhythm Kings performing Benton Overstreet's "There'll Be Some Changes Made" and Jack Palmer and Spencer Williams's "I Found a New Baby".

Several members of this first Chicago Rhythm Kings band, including Condon, Sullivan, and Krupa, also played together in another recording group together, the Rhythmakers. The Rhythmakers made several recordings in 1932 in New York City for Columbia Records which were later reissued on Parlophone Records and Polydor Records under the pseudonym Chicago Rhythm Kings.

In 1936 Tom Berwick and His Ritz-Carlton Orchestra also used Chicago Rhythm King as a pseudonym for a record they made for Bluebird Records.

In 1940 Signature Records released an album with another Chicago Rhythm Kings band consisting of trumpeter Marty Marsala, clarinetist and saxophonist Rod Cless, guitarist Jack Goss, pianist Art Hodes, and string bassist Earl Murphy. That same year the drummer George Wettling also released music with "George Wettling's Chicago Rhythm Kings" for Decca Records.

Currently Bob Schulz and His Chicago Rhythm Kings have been active in performance and on record.

== Bibliography ==
- Richard Crawford, Jeffrey Magee (1992). Jazz Standards on Record, 1900-1942; A Core Repertory. Center for Black Music Research, Columbia College Chicago. ISBN 9780929911038.
- Brian Rust (2002). Malcolm Shaw (ed.). Jazz and Ragtime Records, 1897-1942, Volume 1. Mainspring Press. ISBN 9780967181929.
- Allan Sutton (2005). Pseudonyms on American Records, 1892-1942; A Guide to False Names and Label Errors. Mainspring Press. ISBN 9780967181998.
