= John Mills (disambiguation) =

John Mills (1908–2005) was a British actor.

John Mills may also refer to:

== Politics ==
=== Canada ===
- John Easton Mills (1796–1847), Canadian politician who was briefly mayor of Montreal, Quebec
- John Burpee Mills (1850–1913), Canadian lawyer and member of the House of Commons
- John Sproule Mills (1887–1972), mayor of Saskatoon, Saskatchewan, Canada
- John Archibald Mills (1910–1985), Alberta MLA, 1955–1959

=== UK ===
- John Mills (Conservative politician) (1879–1972), British Member of Parliament for New Forest and Christchurch, 1932–1945
- John Remington Mills (1798–1879), English politician, MP for Wycombe
- John Edmund Mills (1882–1951), British politician, MP for Dartford
- John Mills (MP for Lymington), Member of Parliament (MP) for Lymington in 1625

=== Other countries ===
- John Mills (Massachusetts politician) (1787–1861), American politician
- John Mills (Australian politician) (born 1941), New South Wales politician
- John Atta Mills (1944–2012), President of Ghana
- John Harrison Mills (1842–1916), American Civil War soldier, painter, poet and early Bahá'í
- John Mills (South Dakota politician), member of the South Dakota House of Representatives

== Sports ==
=== Cricket ===
- John Mills (Hampshire cricketer) (1789–1871), British soldier, politician and amateur cricketer, MP for Rochester 1831–35
- John Mills (New South Wales cricketer) (1836–1899), Australian cricketer
- John Mills (Gloucestershire cricketer) (1848–1935), 19th century English cricketer, played for Gloucestershire
- John Mills (cricketer, born 1855) (1855–1932), English cricketer
- John Mills (New Zealand cricketer) (1905–1972), New Zealand Test cricketer

=== Other sports ===
- John Mills (basketball) (1919–1995), American professional basketball player
- John Mills (footballer, born 1900) (1900–?) Scottish footballer from Vale of Leven, also known as Jock Mills
- John Mills (footballer, born 1920) (1920–1982), footballer for Chester City and Altrincham F.C.
- John Mills (footballer, born 1990), English footballer
- John Mills (swimmer) (born 1953), British Olympic swimmer
- John Mills (rugby union) (born 1960), New Zealand rugby union player
- John Henry Mills (born 1969), American football player

== Entertainment ==
- John Mills (stage actor), (1670–1736), English stage actor
- John Mills (encyclopedist) (1717–1794), English writer on agriculture
- John Channell Mills (1929–1998), English theatre actor
- John Mills (writer) (1930–2016), Canadian writer, professor of medieval literature and publisher
- John Mills (sculptor) (1933–2023), English sculptor
- John Mills Sr. (1882–1967), American vocalist, father of The Mills Brothers
- John Mills Jr. (1910–1936), American vocalist, one of The Mills Brothers

== Others ==
- John Mills (businessman) (1938–2025), businessman and founder of JML Direct
- John Mills (soldier) (1754–1796), U.S. Army acting Adjutant General and acting Inspector General
- John Mills (entrepreneur) (1806–1889), Scottish entrepreneur and astronomer
- John Mills (Calvinistic Methodist minister) (1812–1873), British Calvinistic Methodist minister
- John Cruger Mills (1829–1889), American author and director
- John Robert Mills (1916–1998), British physicist and scientific expert on radar
- John S. Mills (1906–1996), United States Air Force Major General
- John T. Mills (1817–1871), Supreme Court Justice for the Republic of Texas
- John W. Mills, president of Paul Smith's College, New York

== See also ==
- Jack Mills (disambiguation)
- Jon Mills (born 1978), Canadian golfer
- Jon L. Mills (born 1947), law professor and Florida politician
- John Mill (disambiguation)
