= Jack Mills =

Jack Mills may refer to:

== Arts and entertainment ==
- Jack Mills (music publisher) (1891–1979), American music publisher
- Jack Mills (set decorator), American set decorator

== Sports ==
- Jack Mills (Australian footballer) (1930–2001), Australian rules footballer
- Jack Mills (baseball) (1889–1973), Major League Baseball third baseman
- Jack Mills (basketball) (1918–2007), American professional basketball player
- Jack Mills (English footballer) (born 1992), English soccer player
- John Mills (New Zealand cricketer) (1905–1972), New Zealand test cricketer sometimes known as Jack Mills

== Other ==
- Jack Mills (classification researcher) (1918–2010), British librarian and classification researcher
- Jack Mills (Great Train Robbery), train driver in the Great Train Robbery
- Jack Mills (Nebraska politician) (1937–2019), American politician from Nebraska

== See also ==
- Mills Music, Inc., formerly known as Jack Mills Music
- John Mills (disambiguation)
