= McPartland =

McPartland is a surname. Notable people with the surname include:

- Jimmy McPartland (1907–1991), American cornetist and one of the originators of Chicago Jazz
- Marian McPartland (1918–2013), English jazz pianist, composer, writer, and the radio host of Marian McPartland's Piano Jazz
- Michael McPartland (born 1939), English Roman Catholic priest
- Richard McPartland (1905–1957), the older brother of Jimmy McPartland, and he was an early member of the Austin High School Gang
- Stephen McPartland (born 1976), English politician

== See also ==
- Frank McPartland Three-Decker, historic triple decker at 61 Paine Street in Worcester, Massachusetts
- James McPartland Three-Decker, historic triple decker at 17 Pond Street in Worcester, Massachusetts
- Marian McPartland's Piano Jazz with Steely Dan
