= Jack Mills (music publisher) =

Music publisher

Jack Mills, born Jacob Minsky, (5 December 1891 – 23 March 1979) was a Russian-born American music publisher and songwriter. He immigrated to the United States at the age of five and grew up in New York City. His first job in the field of music was as a Tin Pan Alley "song plugger"; selling sheet music by playing songs on the piano for customers for a variety of music publishing firms in Manhattan. He ultimately became manager of the McCarthy & Fisher music publishing house prior to establishing his own company.

In 1919 Jack Mills founded Jack Mills Music. He was originally motivated to start the company out of a desire to publish his own songs. He was soon after joined in this enterprise by his brother, Irving Mills. The company was later renamed Mills Music, Inc. in 1928. The company was noted for its many ragtime and jazz publications during the 1920s and 1930s, and for its relationship with the African-American music community during that period. The firm published works by many black composers. It was the most prolific music publishing company in the United States during the 1920s, but afterwards was surpassed by other publishing houses. After World War II, the organization shifted its emphasis to classical music. The company was sold to Utilities & Industries in 1965 at which point Jack Mills retired, having served as president of the company from its founding in 1919 until its sale 46 years later. He lived in Florida during his retirement, and died there in 1979 at the age of 87.

== Life and career ==
The son of Russian-Jewish parents Hyman Minsky and Sophie Minsky (née Dudas), Jack Mills was born with the name Jacob Minsky on 5 December 1891. While multiple sources on Jack Mills state that he was born in New York City, he was born in Russia. His father worked as a milliner and was from the city of Odessa. Jacob immigrated with his family to the United States at the age of five at which point his parents Americanized his first name to Jack. The family resided in an apartment on the Lower East Side of Manhattan.

After finishing the eighth grade, Jack Mills left school and began working for a department store where he was principally responsible for selling neck ties. His career in music began as a Tin Pan Alley (TPA) "song plugger" in which he sold sheet music by playing tunes on the piano for customers. He wrote several of his own songs during this period, including "I Don't Need A Doctor; I Just Need A Beautiful Girl" and "I'll Buy the Ring and Change Your Name to Mine", but failed to convince any of the TPA publishing houses to publish them. He worked his way up in the TPA industry, working for multiple different music publishing firms, and ultimately became the manager of the McCarthy & Fisher music publishing house.

In 1919 Mills launched his own music publishing firm, Jack Mills Music, originally out of a desire to have a means of publishing his own songs. Soon after he founded the company Jack was joined in this enterprise by his younger brother Irving Mills. This company "introduced many popular songs", and became the most prolific music publishing company of the 1920s. It one of the first music publishing companies to embrace jazz as an artform, and was particularly known for publishing music by black composers. An important early song by a black composer published by the company was the rag "Kitten of the Keys" (1921) by Zez Confrey. The firm published more than 100 novelty rags during the 1920s, mainly by black composers. Some examples of important jazz and blues publications by the firm included Lovie Austin and Alberta Hunter's "Down Hearted Blues".

They published a song about Enrico Caruso after his death that became a hit. The firm eventually owned 45,000 songs and was one of the biggest independent music producers in the world.

He loaned money to theater producer Henry Creamer.

Jack Mills died on 23 March 1979 at the age of 87 in Hollywood, Florida.

== Works as songwriter ==
- "I Don't Want a Doctor (All I Want is a Beautiful Girl)"
- "I'll Buy The Ring (And Change Your Name to Mine)" co-wrote with lyricists Ed Rose and William Raskin
