= McKenzie and Condon's Chicagoans =

McKenzie and Condon's Chicagoans was an American jazz band from Chicago, led by banjo player Eddie Condon and sponsored by singer and comb player Red McKenzie. Their four recordings in December 1927 were important influences on early Chicago style jazz.

The group got together in 1962 for a reunion, to record the album Chicago and All That Jazz. Pee Wee Russell replaced Frank Teschemacher, who had died in 1932, on the clarinet, and Bob Haggart filled in for the retired bassist Jim Lanigan. Trombonist Jack Teagarden joined the group for the sessions.

== Recordings ==
Date	Title	Writer	Notes
1927-12-08	"China Boy"	Phil Boutelje, Dick Winfree	
1927-12-08	"Sugar"	Milton Ager, Frank Crum, Red Nichols, Jack Yellen	Not to be confused with Maceo Pinkard's "Sugar" (1927)
1927-12-16	"Liza"	Eddie Condon, Red McKenzie, Aaron Rubin	Not to be confused with George Gershwin's "Liza (All the Clouds'll Roll Away)"
1927-12-16	"Nobody's Sweetheart"	Ernie Erdman, Gus Kahn, Billy Meyers, Elmer Schoebel	Also known as "You're Nobody's Sweetheart Now"

== Personnel ==
- Eddie Condon – banjo
- Bud Freeman – tenor saxophone
- Gene Krupa – drums
- Jim Lanigan – bass
- Jimmy McPartland – cornet
- Mezz Mezzrow – cymbals
- Frank Teschemacher – clarinet
- Joe Sullivan – piano
