= Mills Music, Inc. =

Mills Music, Inc. was an American music publishing company located in Manhattan. Originally known as Jack Mills Music, it was founded by Jack Mills in 1919. It was re-named Mills Music, Inc. in 1928. During the 1920s it was the most prolific music publisher in the United States, but was later surpassed by other music publishers. It remained in operation until 1965 when it was sold to Utilities & Industries. The company is best remembered for its relationship with the African-American community. The publishing house is credited for being one of the first music publishers to promote jazz and it forwarded the careers of many then unknown black composers during the 1920s and 1930s, including Duke Ellington. After World War II, the company switched its focus to classical music and publishing music education materials.

== History ==
Jack Mills was a song-plugger who worked for a variety of Tin Pan Alley publishing houses. He had risen within the industry to the role of manager of the McCarthy & Fisher music publishing house. Also an aspiring songwriter, he had failed to convince any of the publishing companies in New York to publish his music. He founded Jack Mills Music in 1919 partially as a means to publish his own materials. Not long after establishing the company he was joined in the business by his brother Irving Mills. The company was re-named Mills Music, Inc. in 1928. The company was originally located at 152 W. 45th St. but from 1923 resided at the Mills Building at 148–150 W. 46th St.

Mills Music, Inc. (MMI) was the most prolific music publishing company of the 1920s. In the 1920s and 1930s the company had a reputation for supporting and promoting black composers. This began with the publication of more than 100 rags during the 1920s; an important early one being Zez Confrey's "Kitten of the Keys" (1921). It was also one of the earliest music publishers to publish jazz music, and also published other types of music associated with the black community, including blues. One well known blues tune the company published was Lovie Austin and Alberta Hunter's "Down Hearted Blues". MMI is credited for discovering Duke Elington, and Elington was managed by Irving Mills during his early career with MMI publishing his music.

After World War II, MMI's emphasis switched to publishing classical music and music education materials. Jack Mills sold the company in 1965 for $5,000,000.00 to Utilities & Industries. In 1969, Utilities and Industries Corporation merged Mills Music with Belwin, another music publisher, to form Belwin-Mills. Educational publisher Esquire Inc. announced its acquisition of Belwin-Mills in 1979. Gulf & Western acquired Esquire Inc. in 1983 and sold the Belwin-Mills print business to Columbia Pictures Publications (CPP) in 1985. CPP was later acquired by Filmtrax and Filmtrax was acquired by EMI Music Publishing in 1990. In 1994, Warner Bros. Publications expanded its print music operations by acquiring CPP/Belwin, the print operations of Belwin-Mills. In 2005 Alfred Music acquired Warner Bros. Publications (including Belwin-Mills) from Warner Music Group.

The Mills Music catalog is now managed by Sony Music Publishing, which acquired EMI Music Publishing in 2012.

== Partial list of songs copyrighted by Mills Music ==
- "Stardust" (1927) by Hoagy Carmichael
