= Austin Community Academy High School =

Austin High School (Chicago)
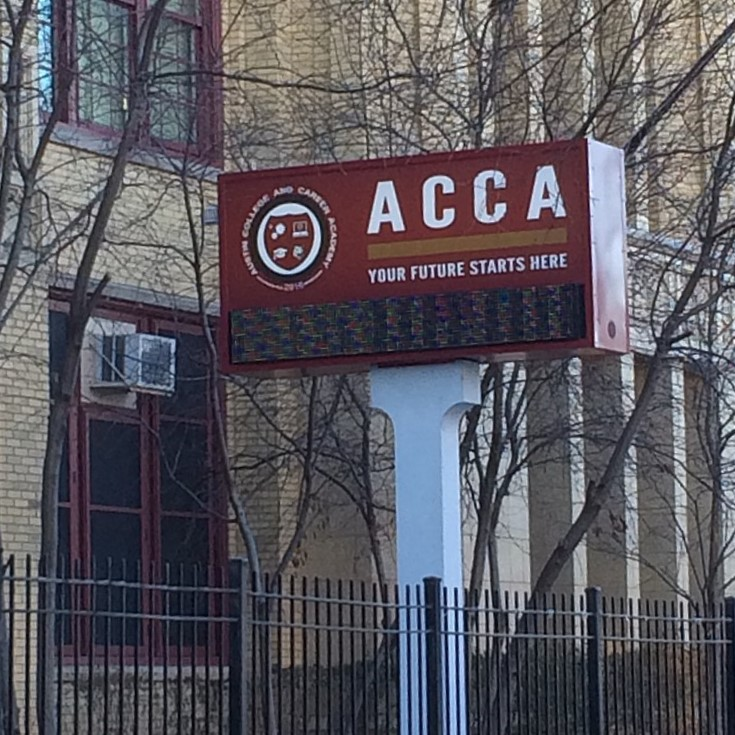

Location
- 231 N. Pine Avenue; Chicago, Illinois 60644; United States; 41.8849°N 87.7626°W

Information
- School type: Public; Secondary
- Motto: "Your future starts here."
- Established: 1876
- Closed: 2016; (Business & Entrepreneurship); 2016; (Polytech); 2016; (V.O.I.S.E)
- School district: Chicago Public Schools
- CEEB code: 140747
- Principal: LaTacia Morgan–Greene
- Grades: 9–12
- Gender: Coed
- Enrollment: 164 (2023–2024)
- Campus type: Urban
- Colors: Maroon; White
- Mascot: Tigers
- Accreditation: North Central Association of Colleges and Schools
- Yearbook: Maroon & White
- Website: accachicago.cps.edu

Austin College and Career Academy High School (formerly known as Austin Polytech High School, commonly known as Austin High School) is a public four-year high school located in the Austin neighborhood in Chicago, Illinois, United States. Operated by the Chicago Public Schools, Austin opened in 1876 and was named in honor of Henry W. Austin, a Chicago real estate developer.

Austin shared its campus with two smaller schools; Austin Business & Entrepreneurship Academy High and V.O.I.S.E. Academy High School. After the 2015–2016 school year, the small schools merged into one school and was renamed Austin College and Career Academy High School.

== History ==
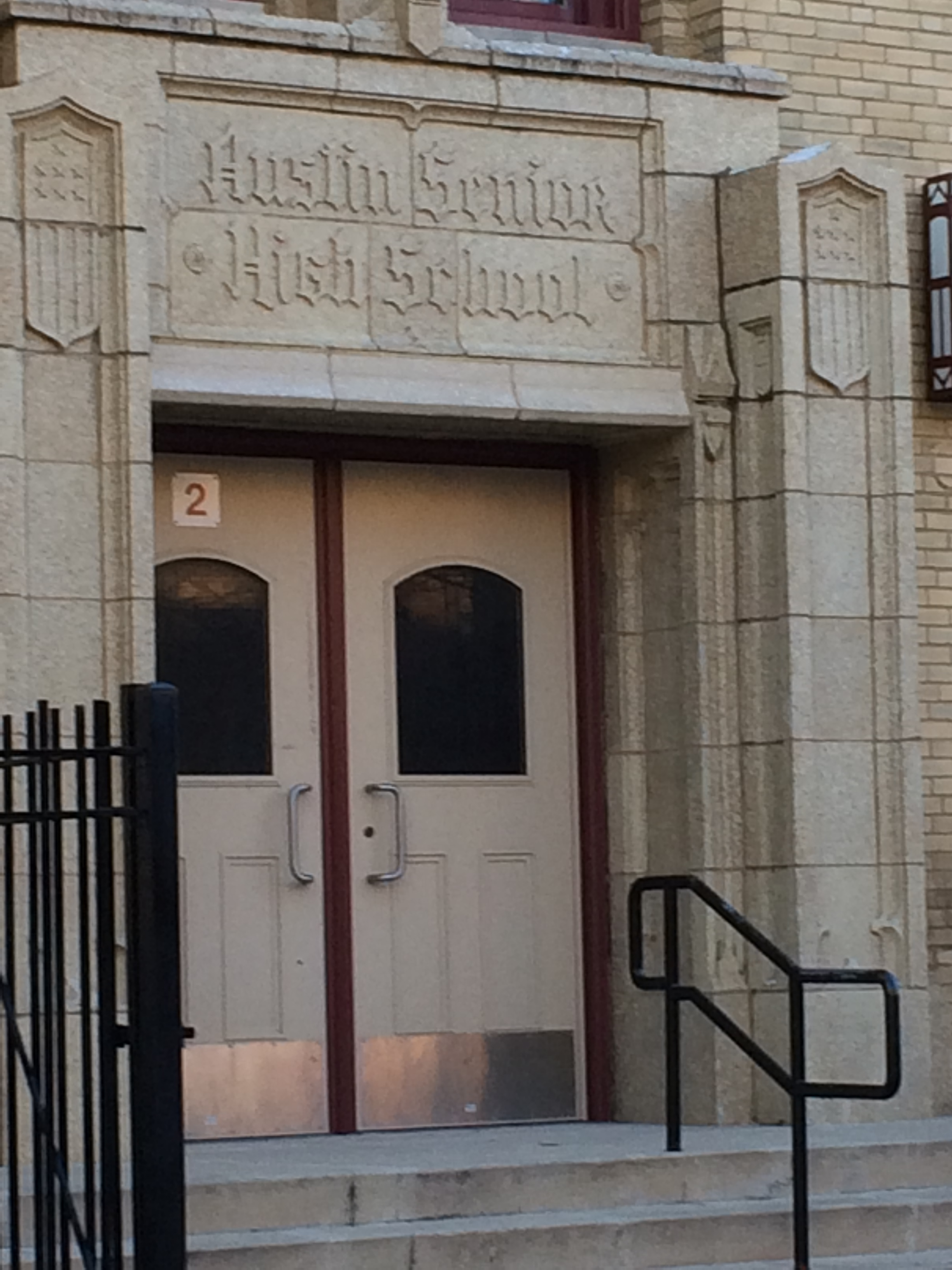
One of the entrances to the school, 2017.

Austin was opened by the Chicago Public Schools district in 1876.

In 1899, the tuition charged to residents of River Forest and Maywood going to Oak Park High School was raised, prompting the students from those towns to move their students to Austin High.

During the mid-twentieth century, Austin High was considered one of the best high schools in the Chicago area. In 2004, the online newsletter Chicago-Catalyst.org called the school "A yellow brick fortress".

In later years, however, Austin suffered from low test scores, low attendance, and student violence. During the 2003–2004 school year, The Chicago Public Schools began phasing the school out, ordering the school to stop admitting new freshmen students. The last graduations were held in June 2007 and the phase-out was completed by the end of summer, 2007. Many of the old school records from 1890 to 1970 were moved to the Chicago Public Library's Special Collections for Community History for preservation after the original closing of the school in 2007.

=== Renaissance 2010 ===
As part of the Renaissance 2010 program, the school's campus was then converted into three smaller high schools:

- Austin Polytechnical Academy, which opened in 2007,
- Austin Business and Entrepreneurship Academy, which opened in 2006,
- V.O.I.S.E. Academy High School, which opened in 2008. (VOISE stands for "Virtual Opportunities Inside a School Environment"; the school combines an online curriculum with classroom instruction.) The schools on the Austin campus share an athletics program. The sports teams are nicknamed the Tigers.

After the 2015–2016 school year, Chicago Public Schools decided to close the small schools and merge them back into one school, naming the new school Austin College and Career Academy High School.

== Athletics ==
Austin competes in the Chicago Public League (CPL) and is a member of the Illinois High School Association (IHSA). Austin sport teams are nicknamed Tigers.

=== Chicago Prep Bowl (1937) ===
In 1937, The school's football team played Leo Catholic High School in the Chicago Prep Bowl at Soldier Field. Austin was led by star running back Bill DeCorrevont, one of the best known high school athletes of his day. The attendance was estimated to be as high as 130,000—possibly the largest crowd to ever attend an American football game. (Sources vary on the exact figure, however; the Illinois High School Association provides an estimate of 110,000 attendees.) Austin won 26–0.

== Chess Team ==
The Team had been on the channel four news for being undefeated statewide and became the statewide champions of the Illinois chess teams which also brought media attention in other aspects which include the Austin Weekly and Chicago Tribune. Mr. Lee was undefeated the entire season and was noted as breaking records and making history for the Austin Community Academy High School as there hadn't been a chess team since the early 1980s. The coach, Richard Dunbar was a detective for the Chicago Police Department who cared entirely about the community and local youth. Abraham Lee is listed in the United States Chess Federation.

== Notable alumni ==
- Mark Aguirre (attended), – DePaul and NBA player.
- Alf Bauman – NFL player.
- Roy Brown – puppeteer and performer-"Cooky the Clown" of Bozo's Circus.
- Larry Canada – former NFL player.
- Marian Carr, actress.
- Bill DeCorrevont – NFL player.
- Jack Drees – Chicago television sportscaster.
- Bud Freeman – jazz musician, member of Austin High School Gang.
- Arte Johnson (1945) – actor, comedian.
- Roberta Karmel, – Educator, Centennial Professor of Law at Brooklyn Law School, and first female Commissioner of the U.S. Securities and Exchange Commission.
- Jim Lanigan – jazz musician, member of Austin High Gang.
- Art Lopatka – MLB player (St. Louis Cardinals, Philadelphia Phillies).
- Phil Masi – MLB catcher (Boston Braves, Pittsburgh Pirates, Chicago White Sox), played in 1948 World Series.
- Dick McPartland – jazz musician, member of Austin High School Gang.
- Jimmy McPartland – jazz musician, member of Austin High School Gang.
- Eric Morris né Fred Stein (1949) – actor and acting teacher.
- Pete Pihos – NFL player.
- Walter J. Reum, – Illinois state representative and lawyer.
- Robert Townsend (1975) – actor, film director, writer and comedian.
- Frank Teschemacher – jazz musician, member of Austin High School Gang.
- Jean Wallace - actress
- Bobby Wilson – NFL player.
- George Wilson – NFL player and coach.
- Abe Woodson – NFL player.
