= Colin Mills =

Colin Mills may refer to:

- Colin Mills (educationalist) (born 1951), British educationalist
- Colin Mills (sociologist), British sociologist
