= A Jazz Holiday =

Compilation album by Benny Goodman
- Released: 1973
- Recorded: June 23, 1928–October 23, 1934
- Genre: Jazz

Professional ratings
Review scores
Source	Rating
AllMusic	4/5 stars

A Jazz Holiday is a jazz compilation released in 1973. It contains tracks recorded between 1928 and 1934 by Benny Goodman, Ben Pollack, Red Nichols, Ted Lewis, Irving Mills, Jack Pettis, Rube Bloom, The Charleston Chasers, and The Venuti-Lang All Star Orchestra.

== Track listing ==
1. "A Jazz Holiday" – Benny Goodman's Boys
2. "'Deed I Do" – Ben Pollack & His Orchestra
3. "Buy, Buy For Baby" – Ben Pollack & His Park Central Orchestra
4. "Bashful Baby" – Ben Pollack & His Park Central Orchestra
5. "Yellow Dog Blues" – Ben's Bad Boys
6. "Dinah" – Red Nichols & His Five Pennies
7. "Carolina In The Morning" – Red Nichols & His Five Pennies
8. "Who" – Red Nichols & His Five Pennies
9. "How Come You Do Me Like You Do?" – Red Nichols & His Five Pennies
10. "Royal Garden Blues" – Ted Lewis And His Band
11. "I'm Crazy 'Bout My Baby" – Ted Lewis And His Band
12. "Crazy 'Bout My Gal" – Irving Mills And His Orchestra
13. "Railroad Man" – Irving Mills And His Orchestra
14. "Sweetest Melody" – Jack Pettis & His Orchestra
15. "Mysterious Mose" – Rube Bloom & His Bayou Boys
16. "That's A Plenty" – Benny Goodman
17. "Clarinetitis" – Benny Goodman
18. "Jungle Blues" – Benny Goodman's Boys
19. "Room 1411" – Benny Goodman's Boys
20. "Blue" – Benny Goodman's Boys
21. "After A While" – Benny Goodman's Boys
22. "Basin Street Blues" – The Charleston Chasers
23. "Farewell Blues" – The Venuti-Lang All Star Orchestra
