= Josh Billings (disambiguation) =

Josh Billings may refer to:

- Josh Billings (1818–1885), the pen name of American humorist Henry Wheeler Shaw
- Josh Billings (catcher) (1891–1981), professional baseball player who played primarily as a catcher
- Josh Billings (musician) (1904–1957), American jazz drummer
- Josh Billings (pitcher) (1907–1983), professional baseball player who played as a pitcher
