= Bert Patrick =

American jazz musician

Bertram Arthur Patrick (April 5, 1912 Denver, Colorado – March 4, 1998 Lakeside, Berrien County, Michigan) was an American bandleader, saxophonist, songwriter, and arranger who performed from the middle 1930s to the early 1960s primarily in Chicago.

In 1947, Patrick recorded as a sideman on saxophone in studio sessions with King Records of Cincinnati. In 1955, he composed songs and recorded as a sideman on saxophone in studio sessions for a small Chicago-based label, Drexel Record Corp., which existed from 1954 to 1958.

== Career sketches ==
In 1932, Patrick was performing with Lovely Walker and his Blue Knights in southern Illinois for a long engagement at the Cotton Club in Moline. The band members included Joe Kelly (banjo), Lovely Walker (piano), Jimmy "Red" Williams (drums, trombone), Al Draden (trumpet, arranger). Following the Cotton Club gig, that same band played at the Harper Hotel in Rock Island, Illinois.

As a Chicago musician, Patrick had an "indefinite" contract with Local 208 dated March 15, 1945, to perform at The Irish Village, followed by another "indefinite" contract dated June 7, 1945.

In November 1946 Bert Patrick was playing in drummer Hillard Brown's six-piece band at the Joe's Deluxe Club (1936–1954) owned by Joseph J. Hughes (1910–2005).

In December 1948, Patrick was playing with trumpeter William (Bill) Martin (1914–1972) and his Hy-Tones at Joe's Delux Club. Besides Martin and Patrick, members included Dolphus Dean (1914–1977) (bass), Jimmy Adams (drums), Moses C. Gant (1916–1972) (tenor sax), and Simeon "Pete" Hatch (1913–1986) (piano).

In 1954, Bert Patrick, was playing tenor sax in the studio band for several vocal sessions at Drexel Records. His first session with Drexel featured a doowop group, the Gems, singing "Talk about the Weather," which he co-composed with Leslie Ford Caldwell, one of the label's founding owners.

== Selected compositions ==
- "You're Tired of Love," words & melody by Leslie Ford Caldwell (1940), arranged by Patrick

Recorded by The Gems & released as a single on Drexel (June 1955)
Vocals: Ray Pettis (tenor lead), Bobby "Pee Wee" Robinson (first tenor and guitar), David "Moose" Taylor (second tenor), Wilson James (baritone and bass), and Rip Reed (bass)
Reissued in a compilation: The Gems meet the Melloharps, OCLC 753704491

- "Talk About the Weather," music by Patrick & Leslie Ford Caldwell (1915–1998) (1943)

Recorded by The Gems & released as a single on Drexel (June 1954)
Reissued in a compilation: The Gems Meet the Melloharps, OCLC 753704491

- "Burr Bench Boogie," words & melody by Patrick & Leslie Ford Caldwell (1943)
- "Atlantic Boardwalk," words & music by Patrick and Leslie Ford Caldwell (1915–1998) (1949)

Recorded by Dave Turner (vocal) & released as a single on Drexel (1955)
Recorded at Universal Recording, Chicago, 1955

- "Crazy About 'Cha, Baby," words & music by Patrick & Virginia Caldwell (1949)
- "Black Gold," music by Patrick & Leslie Ford Caldwell (1915–1998) (1952)
- "Blam," words & music by Patrick, Leslie Ford Caldwell, and Leslie Simmons (1915–1998) (1952)
- "Stoney Island," words & melody by Patrick & Leslie Ford Caldwell (1952)
- "Tell Me, Tell Me, Tell Me," words & music by Patrick (1991)
- "All That Happiness," words & music by Patrick (1992)

== Discography ==
- Bert Patrick Quartet, SD Records, Chicago

Recorded at the Uptown Playhouse Theater, Chicago, January 1946
Bert Patrick (alto sax); Red Norvo (vibes); Jack Goss ( –1971) (guitar); Jim Hall (drums); Josh Billings (suitcase)

1. "Confessin' "
2. "Exactly Like You"
3. "I Talk About the Weather"
- Dorothy Logan (45 rpm; single), Chicago: Drexel (February 1945)

Recorded in Chicago, 1954
Musicians include Bert Patrick (tenor sax); Denni Tillman (piano)
Matrix D-902-X45: "Since I Fell for You," music by Buddy Johnson

- Dwight Gatemouth Moore, King Records, Cincinnati (1947)

Recorded December 26, 1947, in Cincinnati
Dwight Gatemouth Moore, William (Bill) Martin (1914–1972) (trumpet), Bert Patrick, Moses Gant (1916–1972) (tenor sax), Nat Walker, Simeon "Pete" Hatch (1913–1986) (piano), Dolphus Dean (1914–1977) (double bass), James Adams (drums)

1. "Hey Mr. Gatemouth" OCLC 840435596 †
2. "Did You Ever Try to Cry?" †
3. "Something I'm Gonna Be" †
4. "You're Having Hard Luck Blues" †
5. "My Woman Blues" †
6. "She Wants Me to Move" †

Reissued on a 27-track compilation CD:
Hey Mr. Gatemouth — Complete King Recordings, Westside Records, London (2000) OCLC 48010103
