= Frank Teschemacher =

American jazz clarinetist and alto-saxophonist (1906–1932)

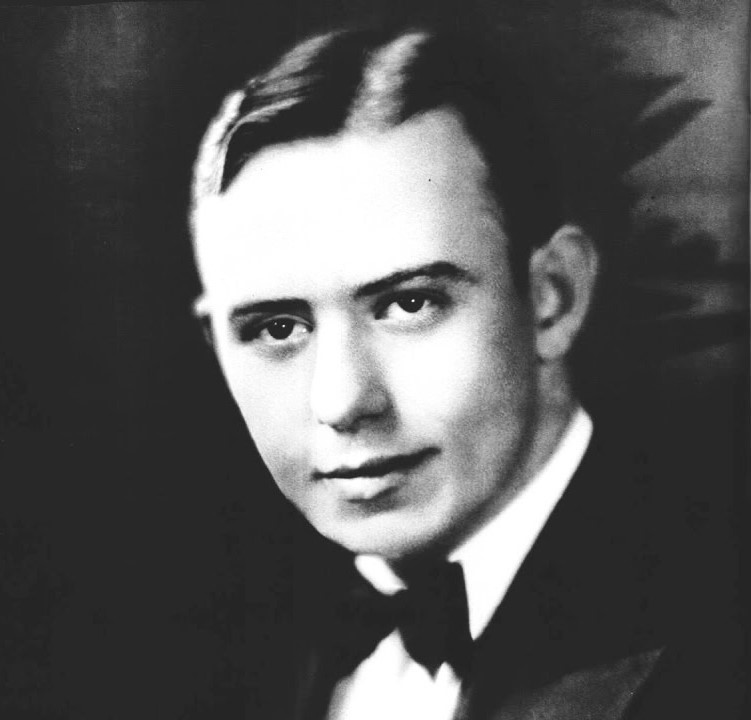
- Teschemacher, ca. 1928

Background information
- Born: March 13, 1906; Kansas City, Missouri, U.S.
- Origin: Chicago, Illinois, U.S.
- Died: March 1, 1932 (aged 25) Chicago, Illinois, U.S.
- Genres: Jazz
- Instruments: Clarinet; alto saxophone

Frank Teschemacher (March 13, 1906 – March 1, 1932) was an American jazz clarinetist and alto-saxophonist, associated with the "Austin High" gang (along with Jimmy McPartland, Bud Freeman and others).

== Early life and education ==
He was born in Kansas City, Missouri, but spent most of his career based in Chicago, Illinois, although gigs sometimes took him to New York City, the U.S. Midwest, and Florida.

Teschemacher was a member of the Austin High School Gang, a group of young, white musicians from the West Side of Chicago, who all attended Austin High School during the early 1920s. They rose to prominence as pioneers of the Chicago Style in the 1920s, which was modeled on a faster version of New Orleans jazz.

== Career ==
Strongly influenced by cornetist Bix Beiderbecke, Teschemacher was mainly self-taught on his instruments; early on he also doubled on violin and banjo. He started playing the clarinet professionally in 1925. He began recording under his own name in 1928 and made what are believed to be his final recordings two years later, although there is now reason to believe (via sine wave recording research, a.k.a. Smith/Westbrook Method) that he appeared on unidentified recordings as late as 1932.

His first recording was with Red McKenzie and Eddie Condon's Chicagoans on December 9, 1927, for Okeh ("Sugar" and "China Boy"). A second session took place one week later ("Nobody's Sweetheart" and "Liza"). The sessions included members of the Austin High School Gang: Jimmy McPartland, Bud Freeman, and Jim Lanigan, as well as Chicagoans Eddie Condon, Gene Krupa and Joe Sullivan. Red McKenzie was the session leader.

In the spring of 1928, he recorded with two other Red McKenzie and Eddie Condon groups, the Chicago Rhythm Kings and the Jungle Kings. On April 28, 1928, he made his first recordings under his own name for Brunswick Records ("Jazz Me Blues" and "Singing the Blues"). The group recorded under the name Frank Teschmacher's Chicagoans. A test pressing of “Jazz Me Blues” was made which was released in 1939 on the United Hot Clubs of America (UHCA) label and later reissued by Decca Records.

Teschemacher's solo work laid the groundwork for a rich sound and creative approach that is credited with influencing a young Benny Goodman and a style of which Pee Wee Russell. He also made recordings on the saxophone. Late in his career, he returned to playing violin with Jan Garber's sweet dance orchestra during the Great Depression.

Teschemacher was featured in episode two, "The Gift", in the 2001 documentary Jazz by Ken Burns on PBS on the topic of the Austin High School Gang.

== Personal life ==
Teschemacher was killed in an automobile accident on the morning of March 1, 1932, a passenger in a car driven by his performing associate cornetist "Wild" Bill Davison. He was twelve days shy of what would have been his 26th birthday.
