= Comb and paper =

Simple musical instrument

Comb and paper is a rudimentary musical instrument which consists of a comb with a piece of paper pressed to it. To play it, one has to press their lips to the paper pressed to the comb and sing or vocalize into it. The voice makes the paper vibrate and changes the voice quality. The 1911 Encyclopedia Britannica refers to it as "the comb-music of the nursery". "Comb and paper" belongs to the category of "singing membranophones", sometimes called "mirlitons" after "mirliton", another name for the eunuch flute.

Playing comb and paper is sometimes called "blue-blowing", possibly in reference to Mound City Blue Blowers.

Comb and paper used to be one of many improvised musical instruments to accompany country–western dances.

== Notable uses ==
The 1923-1936 jazz band Mound City Blue Blowers had Red McKenzie playing comb and tissue paper.

The unusual noises heard in the Beatles song "Lovely Rita" after the lines "and the bag across her shoulder / made her look a little like a military man" were made with a comb and paper.

Jimi Hendrix played comb and paper on his 1968 single recording of "Crosstown Traffic".

Will Thelin plays the comb and paper on the Grammy-nominated album Hold That Tiger by The Muddy Basin Ramblers.

Lyricist Dorothy Fields wrote the line 'I'm tissue paper on a comb' in the song 'I'm A Brass Band' sung by Shirley MacLaine in the movie Sweet Charity.

Graham Nash played comb and paper on "Sleep Song" from his 1971 album, Songs for Beginners.

In the 1994 film Three Colours: White, protagonist Karol Karol plays comb and paper for money in a metro station after losing his salon.

In 2015, IT consultant Narinder Dhani performed "Eye of the Tiger" and "The Final Countdown" on a comb-and-paper as a contestant on Britain's Got Talent series 9.

== Song titles ==
- 1950: "The Comb and Paper Polka", by Doris Day
- 1955: "Comb and Paper Blues", from a single by Ivor Kirchin
- 1967: "Camp", by Sir Henry and his Butlers
- 1971: "My Lady (Nana)" / "Tissue Paper & Comb", a single by Clive Dunn

== See also ==
- Kazoo
