= Amtrak Blues =

Studio album by Alberta Hunter
- Released: 1980
- Genre: Blues, jazz
- Label: Columbia
- Producer: John Hammond

Alberta Hunter chronology
Remember My Name (1978)	Amtrak Blues (1980)	The Glory of Alberta Hunter (1982)

Amtrak Blues is an album by the American blues and jazz musician Alberta Hunter, released in 1980. The album was nominated for a W. C. Handy Award for "Traditional Blues Album"; Hunter won the 1980 award for best "Traditional Blues Female Artist".

== Production ==
The album was produced by John Hammond. Hunter was backed by the Gerald Cook quartet on a few of the album's tracks; Hunter's resurgence was in part due to Cook's championing. Doc Cheatham played trumpet on the album.

== Critical reception ==
Professional ratings
Review scores
Source	Rating
AllMusic	4/5 stars
Robert Christgau	A
The Encyclopedia of Popular Music	3/5 stars
The Penguin Guide to Blues Recordings	3/4 stars
The Rolling Stone Album Guide	4/5 stars

Robert Christgau wrote that Hunter's "timing and intonation are as savvy as you'd figure, and though the voice isn't quite as full as it must have been, it packs an amazing wallop." The Boston Globe thought that the album "exquisitely captures Hunter's spunk, wry humor and zest for life," writing that "Hunter snaps, crackles and pops in a way younger singers can't touch." High Fidelity called it "a bright, clean recording that brings out the warm, vivid colors in her incredibly lively voice." Cadence lamented that the musicians often played "quiet, uninspired cocktail runs." The Richmond Times-Dispatch noted that Hunter "can tickle the libido in spots the randiest modern pop singers haven't discovered yet."

Colin Larkin opined that Hunter "inimitably interpreted every nuance of the lyrics, especially when they were her own." The Rolling Stone Album Guide stated that Amtrak Blues "accurately captures the sassy strength of her singing." The Penguin Guide to Blues Recordings wrote: "Inevitably, 'marvellous for her age' was used as a selling point, but in sober truth Hunter's accuracy, timing and vigour were pretty astonishing."

== Track listing ==
No.	Title	Length
1.	"The Darktown Strutters' Ball"	5:20
2.	"Nobody Knows When You're Down and Out"	3:48
3.	"I'm Having a Good Time"	2:35
4.	"Always"	3:41
5.	"My Handy Man Ain't Handy No More"	3:45
6.	"Amtrak Blues"	3:21
7.	"Old Fashioned Love"	4:12
8.	"Sweet Georgia Brown"	4:10
9.	"A Good Man Is Hard to Find"	3:56
10.	"I've Got a Mind to Ramble"	4:13

== Personnel ==
- Alberta Hunter – vocals
- Doc Cheatham – trumpet
- Gerald Cook – piano
- Vic Dickenson – trombone
- Norris Turney – reeds
- Frank Wess – reeds
