= John Mill =

John Mill may refer to:

- John Mill (died 1555) (1470s–1551), MP for Southampton
- John Mill (by 1533 – 1562 or later), MP for Melcombe Regis
- Sir John Mill, 1st Baronet (1587–1648), English politician
- John Mill (theologian) (1645–1707), English theologian
- John Mill (Bundist) (1870–1952), political leader and activist
- John Stuart Mill (1806–1873), British philosopher and economist

== See also ==
- Sir John Barker-Mill, 1st Baronet (1803–1860), English cricketer
- John Mille, MP
- John Mills (disambiguation)
