= New Solos by an Old Master =

Studio album by Joe Sullivan
- Released: 1955
- Recorded: 1953; San Francisco, California
- Genre: Jazz
- Label: Riverside; RLP 12-202
- Producer: Bill Grauer

New Solos by an Old Master is an album by American jazz pianist Joe Sullivan recorded in 1953 and released on the Riverside label.

== Reception ==
Professional ratings
Review scores
Source	Rating
Allmusic	4/5 stars

Allmusic awarded the album 4 stars with the review by Scott Yanow stating, "Pianist Joe Sullivan, although only 44 at the time, was already slipping into obscurity when he recorded these nine solo and three trio performances ".

== Track listing ==
All compositions by Joe Sullivan except as indicated

1. "Gin Mill Blues"
2. "That's a Plenty" (Lew Pollack, Ray Gilbert)
3. "A Room With a View" (Noël Coward)
4. "Sweet Lorraine" (Cliff Burwell, Mitchell Parish)
5. "Hangover Blues"
6. "Little Rock Getaway"
7. "Honeysuckle Rose" (Andy Razaf, Fats Waller)
8. "Summertime" (George Gershwin, Ira Gershwin, DuBose Heyward)
9. "Fido's Fantasy"
10. "My Little Pride and Joy"
11. "I Cover the Waterfront" (Johnny Green, Edward Heyman)
12. "Farewell to Riverside"

== Personnel ==
- Joe Sullivan – piano
- Dave Lario – bass (tracks 1–3)
- Smoky Stover – drums (tracks 1–3)
