= Room 1411 =

Song performed by Glenn Miller

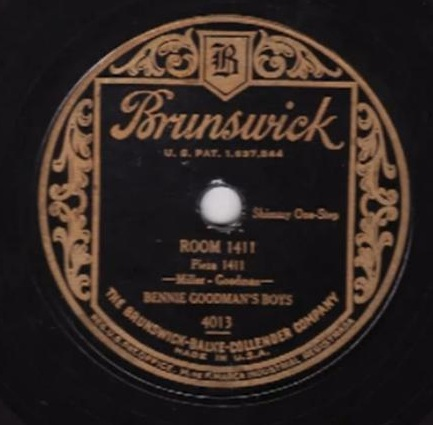
1928 Brunswick 78, 4013, by Bennie Goodman's Boys.

Brunswick 78, 80029A, "Room 1411", Benny Goodman and His Boys, 1950 Collectors' Series reissue.

"Room 1411" is a 1928 instrumental composed by Glenn Miller and Benny Goodman and released as a Brunswick 78 by Benny Goodman's Boys. The song was Glenn Miller's first known composition and was an early collaboration between Glenn Miller and Benny Goodman, who would become the most successful bandleaders of the Big Band Era during the 1930s and 1940s.

== Recording history ==
"Room 1411," also known as "Goin To Town," "Pieza 1411" in Spanish on the label, was composed by Glenn Miller and Benny Goodman in 1928 when Glenn Miller was part of "Benny Goodman's Boys". The instrumental was recorded on June 23, 1928 in New York and was released as a 78, 4013, on Brunswick, paired with "Jungle Blues". The instrumental, Matrix # E27639=C, was described as a "shimmy one-step" on the original Brunswick 78 label as released in 1928.

The personnel that made up "Bennie Goodman's Boys" for the studio recording of "Room 1411" was made up of an all-star ensemble that featured Glenn Miller on trombone, Ray Bauduc on drums, Dick "Icky" Morgan on guitar, Fud Livingston on tenor saxophone, Jimmy McPartland on cornet, Vic Breidis on piano, Harry Goodman on tuba, and Benny Goodman on clarinet and baritone saxophone. The band continued to record in 1928 and 1929. Tommy Dorsey on trombone, Bud Freeman on tenor saxophone, Wingy Manone on trumpet, and Ben Pollack on drums, were also members of the group on other sessions.

Glenn Miller and Benny Goodman lived in the same suite at the time in the apartments in The Whitby in New York whose number was 1411. The title of the composition derives from the apartment number. In Hear Me Talkin' To Ya: The Story Of Jazz As Told By The Men Who Made It (1955) by Nat Shapiro and Nat Hentoff, Jimmy McPartland recalled how the title originated: "[A]fter a couple of weeks we moved into the Whitby Apartments, where Gil Rodin, Dick Morgan, Benny Goodman, and Glenn Miller had a suite. We all moved into that, practically the whole band. ... The number of that apartment was 1411. And that is how that title came up, Room 1411, by Benny Goodman's Boys."

Benny Goodman played baritone saxophone "on the more straight-ahead Chicago-style 'Room 1411'". "Room 1411 (Goin' to Town)" is Glenn Miller's first known composition. Two versions or takes of the instrumental were released. The song was featured on a 1943 album entitled Chicago Jazz Classics, Brunswick Album No. 1007, consisting of four 10" shellac 78s as 80029A which was reviewed in the September 18, 1943 issue of Billboard magazine. The recording was reissued in 1950 as a 33 and 1/3 LP as part of the Brunswick Collectors' Series as Brunswick BL-5815. The LP recording was reviewed in Billboard magazine in 1950 as by Benny Goodman & His Boys.

The recording also appears on the albums The Young Benny Goodman: 1928-1931 released in 2005 by Timeless Records, A Jazz Holiday, a double LP, Decca, 1973, A Jazz Holiday: 1926-31 by Benny Goodman released in 1998 by ASV Living Era, Benny Goodman: 1928-1931, Classics, 1993, and Benny Goodman: Selected Favorites, Volume 17, Charly, 2006.

"Room 1411" appeared on the 1950 Brunswick LP Chicago Jazz Classics.

The instrumental was also released as part of a 7" 45 RPM EP on Brunswick Records as EB-71016 in 1953. An alternate take of the instrumental in German as "Zimmer No. 1411" was released on German Brunswick as a green label 78 single with the 1928 studio recording of "Jungle Blues" as the flip side. The 78 was re-released in Germany also on Brunswick a decade later.

The jazz group Chicago Rhythm with Butch Thompson recorded the song in 1983 on their album One in a Million, Vol. 2, on Stomp Off Records, SOS 1059. The instrumental was performed by the Ballyhoo Foxtrot Orchestra at the 2011 Glenn Miller Festival in Des Moines, Iowa, The Mlp's Dixie Blue Blowers in 2018, Italian clarinetist Lorenzo Baldasso in 2021, and by the Original Swingtime Big Band in concert in Vienna, Austria in 2012.

== Sources ==
- Firestone, Ross. Swing, Swing, Swing: The Life and Times of Benny Goodman. Norton, 1998.
- Shapiro, Nat, and Nat Hentoff. Hear Me Talkin' to Ya: The Story of Jazz As Told by the Men Who Made It. New York: Rinehart and Company, 1955.
- Simon, George Thomas. Simon Says. New York: Galahad, 1971. ISBN 0-88365-001-0.
