= Richard McPartland =

American jazz guitarist

Dick McPartland (May 18, 1905 – November 30, 1957) was a jazz guitarist during the 1920s and the older brother of Jimmy McPartland. He was part of the Austin High School Gang of musicians in Chicago.

McPartland played banjo and guitar. He replaced Eddie Lang in the Red McKenzie band. Near the end of the 1920s, he recorded with Irving Mills and Jack Teagarden and in the 1930s with his brother Jimmy. After a heart attack in the 1930s, he retired from music.
