= Rhythmakers =

1930s jazz recording group

- Also known as: The Rhythmakers, Chicago Rhythm Kings
- Origin: New York City, U.S.
- Genres: Jazz
- Years active: 1932
- Publisher: Irving Mills
- Past members: Billy Banks; Red Allen; Pee Wee Russell; Eddie Condon; Joe Sullivan; Al Morgan; Jack Bland; Gene Krupa; Zutty Singleton; Fats Waller; Pops Foster; Jimmy Lord; Frank Froeba; Chick Bullock; Tommy Dorsey

Rhythmakers, sometime known as The Rhythmakers or the Chicago Rhythm Kings in later re-issues of their music, was a jazz recording group which recorded music in six sessions in New York City in 1932. A racially integrated ensemble, the group was unable to tour or perform publicly due to racial segregation laws enforced throughout the country. Nevertheless, the group's popularity on record helped to bolster support for racially integrated music groups in the years to come.

Rhythmakers was organized by American music publisher and jazz impresario Irving Mills; initially as a means of featuring and promoting the singer Billy Banks. Banks was the featured singer in nine songs recorded during the first two sessions with trumpeter Red Allen, clarinetist and saxophonist Pee Wee Russell, banjoist Eddie Condon, pianist Joe Sullivan, double bassist Al Morgan, and guitarist Jack Bland. Drummer Gene Krupa played for the first session, but was then succeeded by Zutty Singleton who played percussion for the final three session. The third session saw a changeover of performers, with Fats Waller replacing Sullivan on piano, Pops Foster replacing Morgan on double bass, and Jimmy Lord taking over the clarinet but not saxophone parts from Russell. For the fourth and final session, Waller was replaced on piano by Frank Froeba, vocalist Chick Bullock succeeded Banks as the group's singer, and Tommy Dorsey was brought in as a trombonist.

== Discography ==
1932: The Rhythmakers 1932: The Complete Set (Retrieval, 2006)
