= Austin High School Gang =

Group of jazz musicians in the 1920's known as pioneers of the Chicago Style

- Origin: Chicago, Illinois
- Genres: Jazz
- Years active: 1920–30
- Past members: Jimmy McPartland; Dick McPartland; Dave Tough; Dave North; Bud Freeman; Frank Teschemacher; Jim Lanigan; Floyd O'Brien

The Austin High School Gang was the name given to a group of young, white musicians from the West Side of Chicago, who all attended Austin High School during the early 1920s. They rose to prominence as pioneers of the Chicago Style in the 1920s, which was modeled on a hurried version of New Orleans Jazz.

== Early Development ==
In 1922, five kids from Austin High School in Chicago, Illinois formed a little band which consisted of Jim Lanigan on piano, Jimmy McPartland on cornet, his older brother Dick McPartland on banjo and guitar, Frank Teschemacher on alto saxophone, and Bud Freeman on C-melody tenor saxophone. Bud was the greenhorn of the group and the only one who did not also play the violin. At the time, their ages ranged from Jimmy McPartland, who was fourteen, to Jim Lanigan and Dick McPartland, seventeen. Teschemacher was sixteen and Freeman was slightly younger. They were so keen on music that they practiced in school and in their homes.

Coming from comfortable middle-class homes they could, at the outset, pursue their common musical ambitions as a hobby, a circumstance that allowed them much more freedom of choice. Their initial inspiration was a local ensemble called the Al Johnson Orchestra, which gave them the motivation they needed to improve rapidly. Soon, they were playing at the afternoon high school dances, which were then becoming popular in Chicago. The band continued to play – at high school fraternity dances and any other opportunity that presented itself.

== Influences ==
Jazz was a relatively novel style of music in the early 1920s, and it took root largely in New Orleans and New York. However, the spread of culture at the day was hampered by limited technology, so the Austin High School Gang grew up in an environment where jazz music was not yet thriving.

The boys, like many other students from their high school, frequented an ice cream parlor across the street known as “The SPOON and the Straw.” Usually, one of them would feed a nickel to the automatic phonograph. One day, they discovered a record by the New Orleans Rhythm Kings, and were so enthralled by the sound of such authentic jazz that they played the record over and over. Then and there, they named their band "The Blue Friars," after The Friar's Inn on the Chicago Loop where the Rhythm Kings played.

The Austin High Gang came definitely and immediately under the influence of the Rhythm Kings, and tried to emulate the same steady, compelling rhythm, contrapuntal improvisations, tone color, a similar economy of notes and ease of melodic interpretation. Their pre-professional training was almost complete when they heard Gennett records made by Bix Beiderbecke and the Wolverines, and they drew further inspiration from their style of New Orleans music. Having heard records, they went out to hear the bands themselves and discovered King Oliver’s Creole Jazz Band, rounding off their identity with New Orleans jazz.

== Career ==
Sometimes the Austin High Gang played at Lewis Institute, which Dave Tough attended, and he added his drums to the little band. Later, Jim Lanigan picked up the bass through Chink Martin’s playing and soon became the band’s bassist; Teschemacher also began practicing the clarinet, his style showing traces of the glissandi from violin playing. Dave found Floyd O'Brien playing trombone at a University of Chicago jam session. Then, recruiting him and pianist Dave North, they named themselves Husk O’Hare’s Wolverines and were ready to play professionally. They got a job at White City, a large dance hall of Chicago’s south side amusement park, where they played until their disbandment at the end of the White City engagement.

In 1927, Eddie Condon recorded the Austin High Gang as the "Mackenzie-Condon Chicagoans". These recordings catapulted the young musicians into the spotlight and they all subsequently developed acclaimed careers in New York, playing and recording with established musicians like Jack Teagarden, Pee Wee Russell, Benny Goodman and Tommy Dorsey. Of the original Austin High Gang, Jimmy McPartland and Bud Freeman sustained the longest careers in jazz.

== Discography ==
"Bud Freeman – Chicago / Austin High School Jazz In Hi-Fi"

- Released: April 01, 1958
- Format: LP, Mono, Album
- Label: RCA Victor
- Producer: Bud Freeman and his Summa Cum Laude Orchestra
- Singles:
  China Boy
  Sugar
  Lisa
  Nobody's Sweetheart
  Chicago
  At Sundown
  Prince of Wails
  Jack Hits The Road
  Forty-Seventh And State
  There'll Be Some Changes Made
  At The Jazz Band Ball
