= The Whitby =

Residential building in Manhattan, New York

Coordinates: 40°45′35.4″N 73°59′23″W

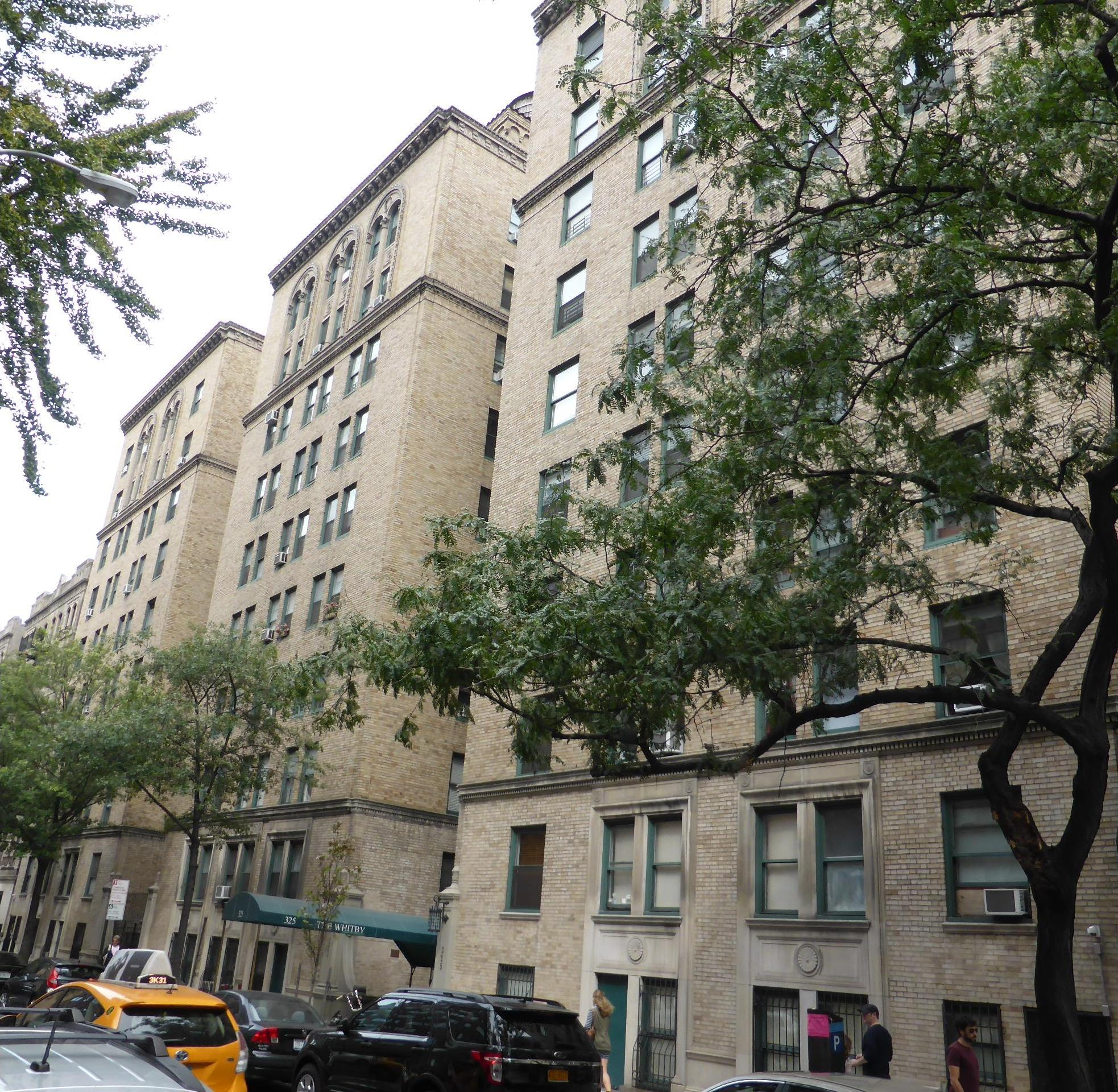
The Whitby, 2015

The Whitby is the name of the residential property at 325 West 45th Street in Hell's Kitchen, Manhattan, New York. The Whitby was designed by architect Emery Roth and built by Bing & Bing general contractors. It was originally commissioned as a hotel by The Gresham Realty Company in 1924 and opened for business on October 1, 1924. The building was converted into a residential cooperative in 1988 by Premiere Marketing Services. The 10-story dwelling between Eighth and Ninth Avenues has 215 apartments.

== Building history ==
The building's architect, Emery Roth, drew inspiration from the Choragic Monument of Lysicrates. The Athenian monument was known to Roth from the reproduction that had featured in the World's Columbian Exposition in Chicago, 1893. Roth also designed The Beresford and other apartment houses and office blocks in New York. Construction began in 1923. The lobby, while completed with terrazzo tile, is of modest size, intended to maintain a residential feel and limit access to press and spectators. The construction process took approximately one year and when the building was completed in October 1924 it opened as a hotel, which it remained until the 1980s.

Six years after the building opened, New York and the rest of the nation was headed into the economic distress of the Stock Market Crash and World War II. During the Great Depression, many of the larger units in the building were subdivided to make them easier to rent. The larger '06-line' and '03-line' one bedroom units were divided into single studio units. As a result, the total number of apartments in the building was expanded by approximately 20 units. This was a fate that fell upon other similar buildings who resorted to unorthodox methods (deferred rent schemes, subdivision of apartments) to remain solvent.

Since that time, however, the market for residential real estate in New York City has changed significantly. The Whitby is now one of the most desirable pre-war apartment buildings in Hell's Kitchen. It converted to a coop in 1988, meaning that most tenants in the apartments are actually shareholders in the corporation that owns the building. The few units that were not purchased at that time by sponsors or tenants that did not buy into the coop, are currently rent regulated or owned by the 325 W 45 St Owners Corporation, whose board of directors presently manages building operations.

== Prominent guests and residents ==
Because of its central location in the heart of the Theater District, The Whitby has had a large following among theatre professionals. Doris Day and Betty Grable were former residents. Even today, many who call The Whitby home are associated with the performing arts in one way or another. Legendary cryptozoologist, Ivan T. Sanderson called the Whitby his home. The Whitby is approximately across the street from the Al Hirschfeld Theatre (formerly the Martin Beck Theatre). "Room 1411" by Glenn Miller and Benny Goodman was named after the suite number where they lived at The Whitby in the late 1920s.
