= Jack Purvis (musician) =

American jazz musician

- Born: John Purvis; December 11, 1906; Kokomo, Indiana, United States
- Died: March 30, 1962 (aged 55) San Francisco, California, United States
- Genres: Jazz
- Occupation: Musician
- Instruments: Trumpet, trombone

John Purvis (December 11, 1906 – March 30, 1962) was an American jazz musician.

Purvis was best known as a trumpet player and the composer of Dismal Dan and Down Georgia Way. He was one of the earliest trumpeters to incorporate the innovations pioneered by Louis Armstrong in the late 1920s. He also played trombone and on occasion a number of other instruments professionally (including harp).

== Early years ==
John "Jack" Purvis was born in Kokomo, Indiana on December 11, 1906, to Sanford B. Purvis, a real estate agent and his wife Nettie (Jackson) Purvis. Jack's behavior became uncontrollable after his mother's death in 1912, and, as a result of many acts of petty larceny, he was sent to a reform school. While there, he discovered that he had an uncanny musical ability, and soon became proficient enough to play both the trombone and trumpet professionally. This also enabled him to leave the reformatory and continue his high school education, while he was playing paying gigs on the side. One of the earliest jobs he had as a musician was with a band led by the Royal Canadian Mounted Police. Not long afterward, he worked with the dance band of Hal Denman.

After high school he worked in his home state for a time then went to Lexington, Kentucky where he played with the Original Kentucky Night Hawks. Around this time he learned to fly planes. In 1926 he was with Bud Rice and toured New England. He then worked the remainder of 1926 and the beginning of 1927 with Whitey Kaufman's Original Pennsylvanians. Purvis married in Pittsburgh, in 1927, and soon became a father. His daughter, Betty Lou, was, for a time, a disc jockey in Pittsburgh in the late 1940s, and a correspondent for Down Beat magazine. This was Purvis' only verified marriage, and rumors persist that he committed bigamy on several occasions. For a short time he played trumpet with Arnold Johnson's orchestra, and by July 1928 he traveled to France with George Carhart's band. It is reported that he had an early brush with the law when he cheated a tourist out of his travelers checks and was forced to leave the band and flee France. Ship's passenger list information reports "Jacques F. Purvis" returning to New York, from Le Havre, France, on November 19. 1928.

In 1929 he joined Hal Kemp's band. From 1929 to 1930 Purvis recorded with Kemp, Smith Ballew, Ted Wallace (a pseudonym for agent Ed Kirkeby), Rube Bloom, the California Ramblers, and Roy Wilson's Georgia Crackers. On December 17, 1929, Purvis led his own recording groups using Hal Kemp's rhythm section to produce Copyin' Louis, and Mental Strain at Dawn.

== The 1930s ==
In 1930, Purvis led a couple of racially mixed recording sessions including the likes of J.C. Higginbotham, and Adrian Rollini. One of these sessions was organized by Adrian Rollini and OKeh A & R man, Bob Stephens.

After leaving Hal Kemp in 1930, allegedly because legal issues precluded his going with the band to Florida, Purvis found work with the California Ramblers. He also worked with the Dorsey Brothers and played fourth trumpet with Fletcher Henderson, although only in a rehearsal capacity.

Purvis' mental stability was always in question, and he attempted suicide on several occasions. Although he was a brilliant musician, capable of either a hot jazz solo or a difficult passage through the hardest of arrangements, he could not be counted on to arrive anywhere on time. This lack of accountability plagued him throughout his life, and can be traced to his earliest years. In many instances, once Jack Purvis showed up to play an extended engagement, not so coincidentally, there was a spike in petty thefts and burglaries for the vicinity of that gig.

From 1931 to 1932 he played with a few radio orchestras and worked with Fred Waring. In 1933 he toured the South with Charlie Barnet. He even talked his way into a job with the New Orleans Symphony Orchestra playing The Carnival of Venice. During this time he also worked in Texas as a pilot perhaps smuggling illegal goods out of Mexico.

He moved to California and was successful with radio broadcasting work. In Los Angeles, Purvis worked for the George Stoll Orchestra as a writer and even worked for Warner Bros. Studios arranging. He composed Legends of Haiti for a 110-piece orchestra. Afterwards he found work in San Francisco as a chef.

At the end of 1935 he joined Frank Froeba's Swing Band in New York. These 1935 recordings with Froeba were the end of Purvis' recording career. He played a couple of weeks with Joe Haymes' orchestra and then disappeared for a couple of years. There was a confirmed sighting of him working in a diner in the midwest around this time. It is also speculated that he worked as a ship's cook on a freighter at the time.

He was arrested in Texas in June 1937, while working as a cook, for his involvement in a robbery in El Paso, Texas. He was tried and convicted and sentenced to jail time in Huntsville Prison. While in prison he directed the Rhythmic Swingsters, the prison band and also played piano with them. The band regularly broadcast on radio station WBAP in 1938.

== Later life ==
In August 1940, Purvis was conditionally pardoned from prison, but he quickly broke his parole and was sent back to prison for six more years. Some sources claim he did this deliberately because he missed the prison band.

On September 30, 1946, Purvis was released from prison one last time. He had a wild reputation and is said to have set hotel rooms on fire. He seldom stuck with one band for very long and was known to hit the streets as a busker. From this time onward he worked at non-musical careers which included working as a chef, an aviator in Florida, a carpenter, a radio repairman in San Francisco. At sometime in his checkered life he was also a mercenary in South America.

According to researcher Paul Larsen, Purvis gassed himself to death in San Francisco on March 30, 1962. Yet Purvis' death certificate indicates the cause of death to be "fatty degeneration of the liver" rather than death by gas poisoning. Cornetist Jim Goodwin claimed that a man who looked like (and introduced himself as) Jack Purvis showed up at a band date a couple of times in about 1968 and that they had a long talk about his life.
