= Remember My Name (film) =

1978 American film by Alan Rudolph

- Theatrical release poster
- Directed by: Alan Rudolph
- Written by: Alan Rudolph
- Produced by: Robert Altman
- Starring: Geraldine Chaplin; Anthony Perkins; Moses Gunn; Jeff Goldblum; Berry Berenson
- Cinematography: Tak Fujimoto
- Edited by: William A. Sawyer; Tom Walls
- Music by: Alberta Hunter
- Production company: Lion's Gate Films
- Distributed by: Columbia Pictures
- Release date: October 1, 1978
- Running time: 94 minutes
- Country: United States
- Language: English

Remember My Name is a 1978 American independent psychological dark comedy-drama thriller written and directed by Alan Rudolph and produced by Robert Altman. It stars Geraldine Chaplin, Anthony Perkins, Moses Gunn, Jeff Goldblum, and Berry Berenson.

Rudolph called it "a definite leap for me as a filmmaker. I was proud of it then and feel the same now. I thought people might pay attention to a different kind of American film in an era of Jaws (1975) and Star Wars (1977), silly me."

== Plot ==
Neil Curry (Perkins) is living a happy life with his second wife Barbara (Berenson) in California after abandoning his first wife Emily (Chaplin) in New York. Their life of domestic bliss is interrupted when Emily comes back from prison, where she had served a 12-year sentence for murdering Neil's former lover. She arrives in California to wreak havoc and to claim Neil back.

== Cast ==
- Geraldine Chaplin as Emily
- Anthony Perkins as Neil Curry
- Moses Gunn as Pike
- Berry Berenson as Barbara Curry
- Jeff Goldblum as Mr. Nudd
- Timothy Thomerson as Jeff
- Alfre Woodard as Rita
- Marilyn Coleman as Teresa
- Jeffrey S. Perry as Harry
- Alan Autry as Rusty (as Carlos Brown)
- Dennis Franz as Franks

== Production ==
Rudolph had just made Welcome to L.A. with the assistance of Robert Altman. According to Rudolph:

Bob was working with Fox and he said, "I think I can get a little film made. You got anything?" And I said let me think about it. On my way home, I drove by the Metro theater and they were showing Rita Hayworth, Ida Lupino movies. Ooh! I got an idea about some kind of loose metaphor for the woman's movement at the time. disguised as one of those B-melodramas. I wrote it in two weeks, thinking this is a giant leap for me.

Rudolph wrote the script in several weeks, creating the lead character specifically for Geraldine Chaplin, who had been in Welcome to L.A. Rudolph described the film as "an update of the classic woman's melodramas of the Bette Davis, Barbara Stanwyck, Joan Crawford era."

Anthony Perkins was cast on the suggestion of Rudolph's wife, who had seen him on stage in Equus. Rudolph later said, "Geraldine Chaplin is a genius. The most original performer, she climbed inside Emily and opened up something singular and beautiful. Tony Perkins was equally wonderful and complex, like Geraldine, he knew where humour was hiding." Perkins suggested his real life wife Betty Berenson to play his on screenwife. Rudolph said "Berry was fresh and real and a sweet person, it was another gratifying example of meeting one actor per role."

Rudolph recalled that Fox backed out two weeks before filming. "We decide that it's two weeks before we have to pay anyone a paycheck. You get two weeks when you first start. So we said we'll shoot for two weeks and if we don't get any money, we'll just shut down." He said the head of Columbia Pictures was desperately looking for films after the firing of David Begelman and during the second week of shooting they agreed to underwrite the film. Filming ended in December 1977.

== Soundtrack ==
The film's soundtrack was composed of songs written for the film and original recordings by singer and composer Alberta Hunter, a veteran of the 1920s–30s nightclub scene and Broadway who appeared in the musicals Shuffle Along and Show Boat with the London cast. The 82-year-old Hunter was in the midst of a musical reemergence when the film was released, having left show business for 20 years after the death of her mother to become a nurse.

Rudolph later recalled "From the beginning I wanted blues, raw and electric. Then when I was nearly through editing, Altman suggested we go to a Manhattan nightclub to see Alberta Hunter... The idea of a single voice for the soundtrack completely rearranged the film’s possibilities in my mind. Celebrated producer John Hammond recorded an album of Alberta’s songs. With each new one, I experimented to find the most appropriate scene and the songs quickly became Emily’s emotional diary, eliminating the need for certain dialogue."

No.	Title	Writer(s)	Length
1.	"Workin' Man a/k/a I Got Myself a Workin' Man"	Hunter	3:44
2.	"You Reap Just What You Sow"	Hunter	4:05
3.	"The Love I Have for You"	Hunter	3:40
4.	"I've Got a Mind to Ramble"	Hunter	2:38
5.	"Remember My Name"	Hunter	3:39
6.	"My Castle's Rockin'"	Hunter	3:09
7.	"Downhearted Blues"	Hunter, L. Austin	5:40
8.	"Some Sweet Day"	Hunter	4:21
9.	"Chirpin' the Blues"	Hunter, L. Austin	4:02
10.	"I Begged and Begged You"	Hunter	3:15

== Release ==
The film was picked up for distribution by Columbia. However when initial returns in Columbus and Indianpolis were disappointing, the film was taken over by Mike Kaplan of Circle Films, who had distributed Welcome to LA.

Release of the film on VHS was held up because contracts did not cover Hunter's songs for new technology.

== Reception ==
=== Box office ===
The film was not a box office success although it ran for a long time in Paris.

=== Critical response ===
On review aggregator website Rotten Tomatoes, the film holds an approval rating of 70% based on 10 reviews.

The San Francisco Chronicle gave the film 4 out of 5 stars, praising Perkins and describing Chaplin's performance as "extraordinary" and that she "adopts a unique speech pattern as Emily. She says everything as though she's rehearsed it and now is blurting it out in what she hopes will be accepted as a reasonable replica of casual speech. Emily's manner only loses its furtive, dodging quality when she feels in control or when she flies into a rage." The review also praises how Rudolph "embellishes his film with sardonic humor" and the "comically macabre touch" of TV news in the background of disasters such as an earthquake that killed one million people in Budapest.

The Washington Post described the film as a "neurotic film noir" that is also a "gripping tale of sexual frustration." The reviewer was also impressed with Chaplin's performance: "Chaplin is spooky, spookier even than Perkins, in this complex performance as a woman who's painfully adjusting to freedom." Jack Kroll of Newsweek praised Rudolph's direction: "he has a real eye for the visual paradox, the elegant and even beautiful form in which this savagery sometimes works." The review praised Perkins as a "specialist at playing the 'nice guy' whose smile and sweat suggest something not so nice underneath." Kroll also heaped praise on Chaplin, saying that her performance "creates something new in the modern pantheon of weirdos. She is chilling in her ability to be both guilty and innocent, victim and predator, catatonic and driven by feelings so deep they draw blood."

Jonathan Rosenbaum said the film "strikes me as the most exciting Hollywood fantasy to come along in quite some time... [it] deliberately suspends narrative clarity for the better part of its running time, and never entirely eliminates the ambiguities that keep it alive and unpredictable... It will only confound spectators and critics who perceive movies chiefly through their plots."

Rudolph later reflected, "After the resounding non-success of Remember My Name, I was depressed and broke." However he also said "Geraldine’s performance in Remember My Name is, I think, as good as any director could ever have in their film."

=== Accolades ===
Association	Year	Category	Recipient(s)	Result
Chicago International Film Festival	1978	Best Feature	Alan Rudolph	Nominated
Paris Film Festival	1978	Best Actress	Geraldine Chaplin	Won
