= Windy City Jamboree =

- Country of origin: United States

Production
- Running time: 120 minutes

Original release
- Network: DuMont
- Release: March 19 – June 18, 1950

Windy City Jamboree is an American popular music program on the DuMont Television Network from March 19 to June 18, 1950. The show aired live from the Rainbow Gardens nightclub in Chicago, Illinois, on Sunday nights from 8pm to 10 pm ET, using the facilities of DuMont affiliate WGN-TV.

The cast included Danny O'Neil, Gloria Van, Jane Brockman and Bud Tygett, Jimmy McPartland, Dick Edwards, "Woo Woo" Stephens, Paula Raye, John Dalz, and the Julian Stockdale Orchestra.

== See also ==
- List of programs broadcast by the DuMont Television Network
- List of surviving DuMont Television Network broadcasts

== Bibliography ==
- David Weinstein, The Forgotten Network: DuMont and the Birth of American Television (Philadelphia: Temple University Press, 2004) ISBN 1-59213-245-6
- Alex McNeil, Total Television, Fourth edition (New York: Penguin Books, 1980) ISBN 0-14-024916-8
- Tim Brooks and Earle Marsh, The Complete Directory to Prime Time Network TV Shows, Third edition (New York: Ballantine Books, 1964) ISBN 0-345-31864-1
