= Billy Banks (singer) =

American jazz singer (c. 1908–1967)

Billy Banks (c. 1908 – October 19, 1967, Tokyo, Japan) was an American jazz singer. Banks is most prominently remembered for being a successful female impersonator on record.

Banks recorded in 1932 with the Rhythmakers; an all-star, multi-racial jazz lineup made up of Red Allen on trumpet, Pee Wee Russell on clarinet, Tommy Dorsey on trombone, Joe Sullivan on piano, Zutty Singleton on drums, and Fats Waller, also on piano; most of the black musicians were from Luis Russell's retinue, while the white ones had been brought to the studio by producer Irving Mills. The vocals were once thought to have been performed by Una Mae Carlisle, but Banks is the actual vocalist.

Banks worked with Russell as a showman and vocalist, and later worked with Noble Sissle. He later performed in cabarets under Billy Rose, then toured Europe, Australia, and East Asia in the 1950s. One of his last recordings was done in Denmark in 1954 with Cy Laurie. Late in the 1950s, he relocated to Japan, and died there in Tokyo in 1967.
