= Joe Sullivan =

American jazz pianist (1906–1971)

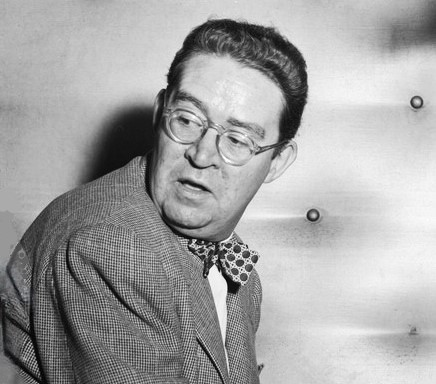
- Joe Sullivan (1947)

Background information
- Born: Michael Joseph O'Sullivan; November 4, 1906; Chicago, Illinois, U.S.
- Died: October 13, 1971 (aged 64) San Francisco, California, U.S.
- Genres: Jazz
- Occupation: Musician
- Instrument: Piano
- Years active: 1924–1971

Michael Joseph O'Sullivan (November 4, 1906 – October 13, 1971) was an American jazz pianist.

Sullivan was the ninth child of Irish immigrant parents. He studied classical piano for 12 years and at age 17, he began to play popular music in silent-movie theaters, on radio stations, and then with the dance orchestras, where he was exposed to jazz. He graduated from the Chicago Conservatory and was an important contributor to the Chicago jazz scene of the 1920s. Sullivan's recording career began towards the end of 1927, when he joined McKenzie and Condon's Chicagoans. Other musicians in his circle included Jimmy McPartland, Frank Teschemacher, Bud Freeman, Jim Lanigan and Gene Krupa. In 1932 he was a member of recording group the Rhythmakers. In 1933, he joined Bing Crosby as his accompanist, recording and making many radio broadcasts.

He contracted tuberculosis in 1936, and while he was convalescing at a sanitarium in Monrovia, California in 1937, Crosby organized and appeared in a five-hour benefit for him at the Pan-Pacific Auditorium in Los Angeles on May 23, 1937 in front of an audience of six thousand. The show was broadcast over two different radio stations, with fourteen bands attending (including those led by Woody Herman, Ray Noble, Jimmy Dorsey, Jimmy Grier, Louis Prima, Harry Owens, and Victor Young) and other performers included Connie Boswell, Johnny Mercer, Red Norvo, and Ella Logan. Approximately $3,000 was raised for Sullivan.

After suffering for two years with tuberculosis, he briefly re-joined Bing Crosby in 1938 and the Bob Crosby Orchestra in 1939. In 1940, when leading Joe Sullivan's Cafe Society Orchestra, he had a minor hit with "I've Got a Crush on You".

By the 1950s, Sullivan was largely forgotten, playing solo in San Francisco. Marital difficulties and excessive drinking caused Sullivan to become increasingly unreliable and unable to keep a steady job, either as band member or soloist. In 1963, Sullivan met up with old colleagues Jack and Charlie Teagarden plus Pee Wee Russell when they performed at the Monterey Jazz Festival.

The British poet (and jazz pianist) Roy Fisher celebrated Sullivan's playing with a poem, "The Thing About Joe Sullivan".

Joe Sullivan died in San Francisco in October 1971, at the age of 64.

== Discography ==
- 1933: Gin Mill Blues (Columbia)
- 1935: Little Rock Getaway (Decca)
- 1941: Forevermore (Commodore)
- 1953: Jazz, Vol. 9: Piano (Folkways)
- 1953: Hangover Blues (Brunswick)
- 1953: New Solos by an Old Master (Riverside)
- 1954: Joe Sullivan Plays Fats Waller (Philips)
- 1956: Mr. Piano Man (Down Home)
- 1961: Chicago And All That Jazz! (Verve)
- 1966: The Asch Recordings, 1939 to 1947 - Vol. 1: Blues, Gospel, and Jazz (Folkways)
- 1973: The Musical Moods of Joe Sullivan: Piano (Folkways)
