= Mound City Blue Blowers =

American jazz group (1923–1936)

The Mound City Blue Blowers were an American novelty jazz ensemble, formed in St. Louis, Missouri, United States. It was co-founded by Red McKenzie and Jack Bland and performed from 1923 to 1936.

First assembled in 1923, the group's original members were Red McKenzie playing comb and tissue paper, Dick Slevin on kazoo, and Jack Bland on banjo. The band also included, in lieu of a drum kit, a traveler's suitcase played with foot and whisk brooms by Josh Billings. Their debut recording, the 1924 release "Arkansas Blues" b/w "Blue Blues", was a hit in the Midwest. They recorded twelve tunes in 1924 and 1925; Frankie Trumbauer and Eddie Lang played on some of the tracks.

After 1925, McKenzie recorded under his own name as a vocalist, but returned to the Mound City name in 1929 for several sessions with jazz stars including Jack Teagarden, Coleman Hawkins, Glenn Miller, and Pee Wee Russell. In 1931, the group recorded with McKenzie, Hawkins, Muggsy Spanier, and Jimmy Dorsey. The last recordings to bear the Mound City name, 25 songs from 1935–1936, included appearances from Nappy Lamare, Spooky Dickenson, Billy Wilson, Bunny Berigan, Yank Lawson, and Eddie Miller.

In 1929–1931, the group also made at least two short performance films: The Opry House (1929) and Nine O'Clock Folks (1931), which included "I Ain't Got Nobody", "Let Me Call You Sweetheart", "My Gal Sal", and "St. Louis Blues".
