= John Mills (Calvinistic Methodist minister) =

John Mills (1812–1873) was a Welsh author and Calvinistic Methodist minister.

== Life ==
Born 19 December 1812 at Llanidloes, Montgomeryshire, he was son of Edward Mills and his wife Mary. Concentrating on music, he travelled through the country, establishing musical societies. In 1846 he went to London to act as a missionary to the Jews on behalf of the Welsh Calvinistic Methodists. In 1855 and 1859 he visited Palestine, in order to better equip himself for this work. He was a member of many learned societies connected with biblical and oriental studies. He died in London, 28 July 1873.

Mills died on 28 July 1873 at 13 Brook Street, Hanover Square, London, and was buried at Abney Park Cemetery, Stoke Newington, London.

== Works ==
Mills's major works were:

- Grammadeg Cerddoriaeth, a grammar of music (Llanidloes, 1838), the first complete musical handbook published in the Welsh language.
- British Jews, London, 1853.
- Palestina, in Welsh, Llanidloes, 1858.
- Three Months' Residence in Nablûs, and an Account of the Modern Samaritans, London, 1864.
