= John Mills (cricketer, born 1855) =

English cricketer

John Mills (28 January 1855 – 27 June 1932) was an English first-class cricketer active 1875–85 who played for Nottinghamshire. He was born in Coddington and died in Ilkeston. He played in thirteen first-class matches as a right-handed batsman, scoring 140 runs with a highest score of 24.
