= John Mills (New South Wales cricketer) =

Australian cricketer

Personal information
- Born: 3 June 1836; Botley, Hampshire, England
- Died: 24 February 1899 (aged 62); Southampton, England
- Source: ESPNcricinfo, 8 January 2017

John Mills (3 June 1836 – 24 February 1899) was an Australian cricketer. He played one first-class match for New South Wales in 1857/58.

== See also ==
- List of New South Wales representative cricketers
