= Frank McPartland Three-Decker =

- U.S. National Register of Historic Places
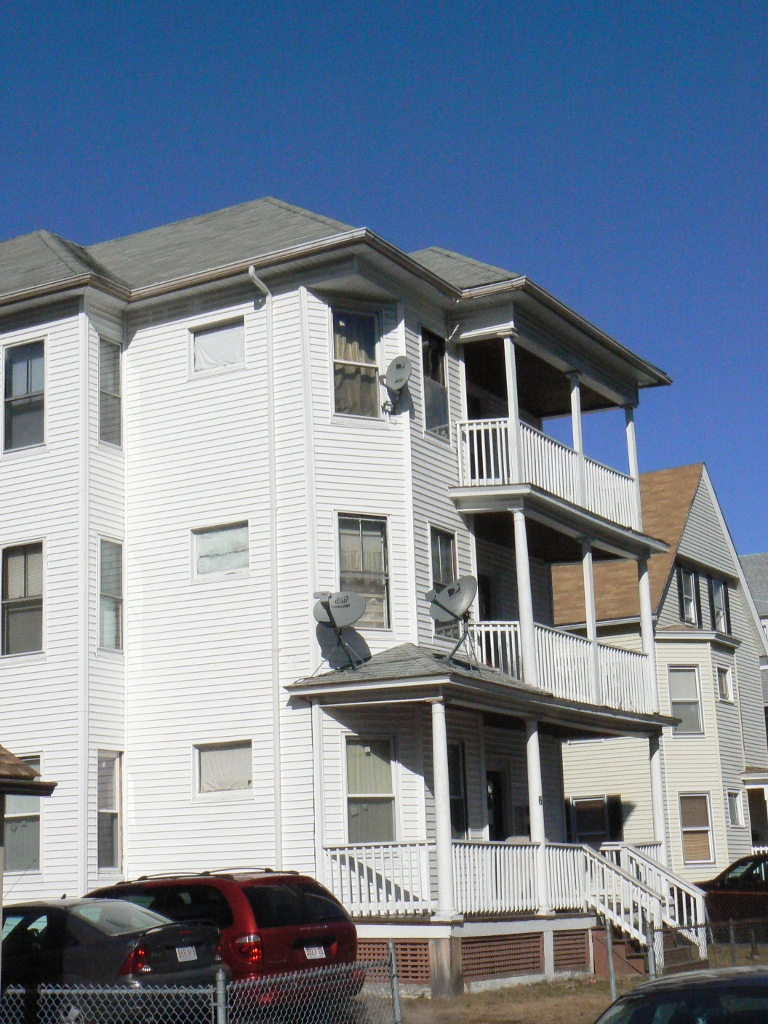

- Location within Massachusetts Location within the United States
- Location: 61 Paine St., Worcester, Massachusetts
- Coordinates: 42°16′54″N 71°47′40″W
- Area: less than one acre
- Built: c. 1912
- Architectural style: Colonial Revival
- MPS: Worcester Three-Deckers TR
- NRHP reference No.: 89002436
- Added to NRHP: February 9, 1990

The Frank McPartland Three-Decker is a historic triple-decker house in Worcester, Massachusetts. Built about 1912, it is a well-preserved instance of a typical modestly styled Colonial Revival three decker, although some architectural details have been lost to subsequent exterior changes. The house was listed on the National Register of Historic Places in 1990.

== Description and history ==
The Frank McPartland Three-Decker is located in Worcester's northeastern Brittan Square neighborhood, on the west side of Paine Street between Harlow Street and Green Hill Parkway. It is a three-story wood frame structure, covered by a hip roof and clad in modern siding. Its main facade is asymmetrical, with a three-level projecting polygonal window bay on the left. The right side is dominated by a three-level porch, which projects beyond the window bay, and has a single-story section extending all the way across the front. It is supported by posts with simple Tuscan styling, round on the first two floors and square on the third. Its main roof eave was originally studded with modillion blocks, and its porch railings were once more elaborate; these details have been lost (see photo).

It was built c. 1912, when the Lincoln Street/Brittan Square area was developed as a streetcar suburb, and is a well-preserved example of Colonial Revival styling. Frank McPartland, its first owner, was a postal letter carrier who also lived here. Early tenants included another letter carrier and a wireworker, as well as a milliner and a fireman.

== See also ==
- National Register of Historic Places listings in eastern Worcester, Massachusetts
