= Frank Froeba =

American jazz musician (1907–1981)

Frank Froeba or Froba (August 1907, New Orleans - February 16, 1981, Miami) was an American jazz pianist and bandleader.

Froeba held jobs in the bands of Johnny Wiggs and John Tobin while still in his teens. He played with Johnny de Droit in New York City in 1924-1925, then led his own band in Atlantic City in the latter half of the decade, in addition to moonlighting in other dance ensembles. He recorded with Jack Purvis in 1930 and with Jack Bland in 1932, then worked with Benny Goodman in 1933-1935. From 1935 to 1944, he led his own band, including on recordings for Columbia and Decca. Among his sideman were Bunny Berigan, Jack Purvis, Bobby Hackett and Joe Marsala. He was a house pianist for Decca in the 1930s and 1940s, playing behind Bob Howard and Lil Armstrong, among others. In 1955, he moved to Miami and performed as Frank Froba, moving more into popular performance.

One of his more popular tracks, "Jumpin' Jive", which Froeba co-wrote with Cab Calloway, was recorded by Joe Jackson on his Joe Jackson's Jumpin' Jive album.

== Other sources ==
- "Frank Froeba". The New Grove Dictionary of Jazz.
