= Colin Mills (educationalist) =

British educationalist and writer (born 1951)

Colin Mills (born Chester, Cheshire 6 January 1951) is a British educationalist and writer specialising in the topics of children's literature, literacy and policy research.

== Early life and education ==
He was born in Chester in 1951. His father was the actor John Channell Mills. His younger brother Bob Mills is a comedian and writer.

He was educated at Chester College, (Cert. Ed., 1973) University of Liverpool, (B.Ed. Hons, 1974, winning the Morrell Memorial Prize) and the University of London Institute of Education, (MA Ed, 1977, with distinction).

== Writing ==
Mills has written extensively on children's literacy and literature, including Language and Literacy in the Primary School (1988, with Margaret Meek), Connecting, Creating: new ideas in teaching writing (2005, with Sue Ellis), and contributions to The Routledge Encyclopedia of Children's Literature (2003), and the International Companion Encyclopedia of Children's Literature' (2007). His later work focused on education policy and research, including the edited collection on Education Policy Research (2014, with Helen Gunter and David Hall) and Consultants and consultancy: the case of education (2017, with Helen Gunter).

Forthcoming works include a book on the marketisation of literacy in English primary schooling and an intellectual biography of Margaret Meek Spencer, who was his supervisor, mentor and co-author in the 80s and 90s.

== Teaching and research career ==
Mills taught in schools in Cheshire and London, and worked as an advisory teacher and a researcher (1972–1989). He has held positions at the Universities of Exeter, Central England, Worcester, (1989–2007); and, since September 2007, University of Manchester, where he was a Senior Teaching Fellow. After semi-retiring in 2014, he became an Honorary Teaching Fellow. He is also an Honorary Research Fellow at Newman University, Birmingham and a visiting scholar at Ontario Institute for Studies in Education (OISE, Toronto).
