= John Channell Mills =

- Born: 26 March 1929; London, England
- Died: 16 October 1998 (aged 69); London, England
- Occupations: Actor/director and production manager
- Spouses: 4
- Children: Bob Mills; Colin MillsPamela mills

John Channell Mills (26 March 1929 – 16 October 1998) was an English actor, working in the theatre. He was born in London and was the father of comedian, Collin Mills and Pamela Mills, and the writer/educationalist, Colin Mills, through his first two wives, respectively. His youngest son, sound engineer and lighting designer, Danny Mills, was born to his wife, Maria Warburg, in 1968. Mills died at his home in Gipsy Hill from complications relating to emphysema on 16 October 1998, aged sixty-eight.

He appeared in Return to Blood River in 1994 and Time Capsule in 1991.
