= Josh Billings (musician) =

American jazz musician (1905–1957)

- Birth name: Frank R. Billings
- Born: 1904; Chicago
- Died: March 13, 1957 (aged 52–53); New York City
- Genres: Jazz
- Occupation: Musician
- Instrument: Drums

Frank R. "Josh" Billings (1904 – March 13, 1957) was an American jazz drummer.

Born in Chicago, after moving to New York Billings performed and recorded with Jack Teagarden, Eddie Condon, and Red McKenzie in the Mound City Blue Blowers.
