= Jim Lanigan =

American jazz bassist and tubist (1902–1983)

Jim Lanigan (January 30, 1902 - April 9, 1983) was an American jazz bassist and tubist.

Lanigan learned piano and violin as a child, and played piano and drums in the Austin High School Blue Friars before specializing on bass and tuba. Lanigan was a member of the Austin High Gang, and played with Husk O'Hare (1925), the Mound City Blue Blowers, Art Kassel (1926–27), the Chicago Rhythm Kings, the Jungle Kings, and the 1927 McKenzie and Condon's Chicagoans recordings.

From 1927 to 1931 he played with Ted Fio Rito and worked in orchestras for radio, including NBC Chicago. He played as a sideman in the 1930s and 1940s with Jimmy McPartland (1939), Bud Jacobson's Jungle Kings (1945), Bud Freeman (1946), and Danny Alvin (1950), but began to concentrate more on music outside of jazz at that time. He played with the Chicago Symphony Orchestra from 1937 to 1948, and did extensive work as a studio musician.

Lanigan never recorded a date as a leader. He played in reunion gigs for the Austin High Gang nearly up until the time of his death.
