= Jack Mills (Australian footballer) =

Australian rules footballer

Personal information
- Full name: Jack Mills
- Born: 30 March 1930
- Died: 7 July 2001 (aged 71)
- Original team: South Bendigo
- Height: 171 cm (5 ft 7 in)
- Weight: 70.5 kg (155 lb)
- Position: Midfielder

Playing career^{1}
Years	Club	Games (Goals)
1950–57	Carlton	124 (128)
- ^{1} Playing statistics correct to the end of 1957.

Jack Mills (30 March 1930 – 7 July 2001) was an Australian rules footballer who played with Carlton in the Victorian Football League (VFL).
