= Jack Bland =

American jazz banjoist and guitarist (1899–1968)

- Born: May 8, 1899; Sedalia, Missouri, U.S.
- Died: October 18, 1968 Van Nuys, California
- Genres: Jazz
- Occupation: Musician
- Instrument: Guitar

Jack Bland (May 8, 1899 – August 1968) was an American jazz banjoist and guitarist.

Born in Sedalia, Missouri, Bland co-founded the Mound City Blue Blowers with Red McKenzie in 1924 in St. Louis. Their first hit record was "Arkansas Blues", a success in Chicago and the American midwest. After Eddie Lang joined the group late in 1924, the group booked a tour in England.

Later in the 1920s, Bland began playing more cello and guitar. In 1929, Lang left the group, and Gene Krupa joined; Muggsy Spanier, Coleman Hawkins, and Eddie Condon would all play in the ensemble in the 1930s, which moved to more of a Dixieland sound. Also in 1929, the Blue Blowers appeared in a 1929 short film, The Opry House.

In 1932 Bland did session work in New York City with the Rhythmakers, a recording ensemble featuring singer Billy Banks, with Pee Wee Russell, Red Allen, and Zutty Singleton. Musicians Pops Foster and Fats Waller also played with the group at times.

In the 1940s Bland played on 52nd Street at Jimmy Ryan's Club, playing with Allen and Singleton as well as Edmond Hall, Vic Dickenson, Ike Quebec, and Hot Lips Page; some of their sessions were recorded by Milt Gabler and released on Commodore Records. From 1942 to 1944 he played with Art Hodes and also with Muggsy Spanier; he led his own band from 1944 to 1950.

In the 1950s, Bland moved to Los Angeles and retired from performing, taking work as a taxicab driver. He died there on October 18, 1968.
