= Lovie Austin =

American bandleader, musician, composer, and singer (1887–1972)

Background information
- Also known as: Cora Calhoun; Cora Austin
- Born: Cora Taylor; September 19, 1887; Chattanooga, Tennessee, United States
- Died: July 8, 1972 (aged 84) Chicago, Illinois, United States
- Genres: Jazz, Jazz blues
- Occupations: Musician; Composer; Bandleader
- Instrument: Piano
- Years active: 1920s–1972
- Label: Paramount

Cora "Lovie" Austin (September 19, 1887 – July 8, 1972) was an American Chicago bandleader, session musician, composer, singer, and arranger during the 1920s classic blues era. She and Lil Hardin Armstrong are often ranked as two of the best female jazz blues piano players of the period.

== Life and career ==
She was born Cora Taylor in Chattanooga, Tennessee. She grew up with eight brothers and sisters. She took the name Cora Calhoun in her teens from an early marriage; she was married for a short time to a movie house operator in Detroit and then later married a vaudeville performer, Phillip Austin. She studied music theory at Roger Williams University in Nashville, and Knoxville College in Knoxville, Tennessee, which was uncommon for African American women and jazz musicians alike during the time.

In 1923, Lovie Austin decided to make Chicago her home, and she lived and worked there for the rest of her life. She was often seen racing around town in her Stutz Bearcat with leopard skin upholstery, dressed to the teeth. Her early career was in vaudeville, where she played piano and performed in variety acts. Accompanying blues singers was Lovie's specialty, and can be heard on recordings by Ma Rainey ("Moonshine Blues"), Ida Cox ("Wild Women Don't Have the Blues"), Ethel Waters ("Craving Blues"), and Alberta Hunter ("Sad 'n' Lonely Blues").

She led her own band, the Blues Serenaders, which usually included trumpeters Tommy Ladnier, Bob Shoffner, Natty Dominique, or Shirley Clay on cornet, Kid Ory or Albert Wynn on trombone, and Jimmy O'Bryant or Johnny Dodds on clarinet, along with banjo and occasional drums. The Blues Serenaders developed their own unique sound within the jazz genre. They strayed away from the typical jazz band paradigm. Austin worked with many other top jazz musicians of the 1920s, including Louis Armstrong, with whom she worked on the song "Heebie Jeebies". Austin's skills as songwriter can be heard in "Down Hearted Blues", a tune she co-wrote with Alberta Hunter. The lament of a woman with a broken heart, the song describes how the man she loved "wrecked her life." Singer Bessie Smith turned the song into a hit in 1923. Austin was also a session musician for Paramount Records. Austin and the Blues Serenaders recorded with Paramount Records during their temporary shift from New York to Chicago in 1923.

When the classic blues craze began to wane in the early 1930s, Austin settled into the position of musical director for the Monogram Theater, at 3453 South State Street in Chicago where all the T.O.B.A. acts played. She worked there for 20 years. During wartime, many jazz musicians had to find other forms of work to support themselves and Austin was reported to be working as a security guard at a defense plant. After World War II she became a pianist at Jimmy Payne's Dancing School at Penthouse Studios, and performed and recorded occasionally. In 1961 as interest in her early career grew she made a significant recording with Alberta Hunter in Chicago.

Austin died on July 8, 1972, in Chicago. In 2018, the Killer Blues Headstone Project placed a headstone for Austin at Mount Glenwood Cemetery in Chicago.

== Influence ==
Mary Lou Williams, a pianist born in Atlanta, Georgia, claimed that Lovie Austin is her greatest influence. Williams refers to Austin as "a fabulous woman and a fabulous musician too. I don't believe there's a woman around now who could compete with her. She was a greater talent than many of the men of this period." With her performances and compositions, Austin enriched the lives of black female artists during the Harlem Renaissance.

== Discography ==
- 1924-26 -The Chronological Lovie Austin (Classics, 1994)
- 1961 - Alberta Hunter with Lovie Austin's Blues Serenaders (Riverside Records, 1961)
