= Jimmy McPartland =

American jazz cornetist (1907–1991)

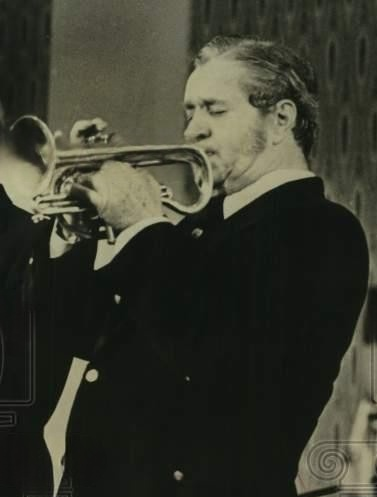
- McPartland in 1977

Background information
- Born: James Dugald McPartland; March 15, 1907; Chicago, Illinois, U.S.
- Died: March 13, 1991 (aged 83) Port Washington, New York, U.S.
- Genres: Jazz, Dixieland
- Occupation: Musician
- Instrument: Cornet
- Years active: 1930s–1970s
- Labels: Prestige, MGM, Grand Award, Epic, Mercury, RCA, Jazzology

James Dugald "Jimmy" McPartland (March 15, 1907 – March 13, 1991) was an American cornetist. He worked with Eddie Condon, Art Hodes, Gene Krupa, Benny Goodman, Jack Teagarden, and Tommy Dorsey, often leading his own bands. He was married to pianist Marian McPartland.

== Early life ==
McPartland was born in Chicago, Illinois. His father was a music teacher and baseball player. He and his siblings for some time lived in orphanages. After being removed from one orphanage for fighting, he got in further trouble with the law. He credited music with turning him around; he started violin at age five, and took up the cornet at age 15.

== Music career ==
=== Austin High School Gang ===
McPartland was a member of the Austin High School Gang, with Bud Freeman (tenor sax), Frank Teschemacher (clarinet), his brother Dick McPartland (banjo/guitar), brother-in-law Jim Lanigan (bass, tuba and violin), Joe Sullivan (piano), and Dave Tough (drums) in the 1920s. They were inspired by the recordings they heard at the local malt shop, the Spoon and Straw. They studied and tried to duplicate what they heard on recordings by the New Orleans Rhythm Kings and others, and would frequently visit Louis Armstrong, who was a few years their senior, and King Oliver's Creole Jazz Band.

McPartland’s career spanned more than five decades, during which he played an integral role in the evolution of Chicago jazz. His work with the Austin High School Gang helped define the Chicago jazz style, marked by its lively, improvisational energy. In addition to performing, McPartland contributed to the jazz revival movement of the 1940s and 1950s, ensuring that Dixieland music remained relevant in a changing musical landscape. His ability to adapt his style while staying true to traditional jazz made him a key figure in preserving the genre’s history.

McPartland’s early career was shaped by his association with the Austin High School Gang. This grouped helped establish the Chicago style of jazz. This group's improvisational approach, heavily influenced by New Orleans jazz, emphasized creative freedom and energetic ensemble playing. McPartland’s cornet playing during this period was noted for its melodic inventiveness and laid-back phrasing, qualities that would define his style throughout his career.

Critics have noted that the Gang’s collaborations laid the groundwork for the transition from New Orleans jazz to the more free-flowing Chicago style.

The Austin High School Gang played. a significant role in Chicago jazz history and served as an early platform for McPartland’s career. As a key member of the group, McPartland brought a melodic yet energetic approach to the cornet, helping the Gang introduce a younger, more modern audience to jazz. The group’s informal jam sessions at Chicago’s South Side clubs became legendary, solidifying their status as innovators of the city’s vibrant jazz scene.

=== New York City bands ===
After playing through high school, their first musical job was under the name the Blue Friars. In 1924, at age 17, McPartland went to New York City to take Bix Beiderbecke's place in the Wolverines band. Beiderbecke sat at the back of the club during the audition. They became friends and roomed together. At that time, Beiderbecke picked out the cornet for McPartland that he played throughout his career.

After relocating to New York City in the late 1920s, McPartland joined several prominent bands, working with jazz greats such as Benny Goodman and Gene Krupa. His performances during this era showcased his versatility, blending the structured arrangements of big band music with the spontaneity of Chicago jazz. These collaborations helped McPartland refine his technique and expand his influence in the jazz world.

From 1926-27, he worked with Art Kassel. Also in 1927, he was a part of the McKenzie-Condon's Chicagoans recording session that produced "China Boy" and "Nobody's Sweetheart". Finally, in 1927, he joined Ben Pollack's band for two years, and was one of the main soloists (with Benny Goodman, Bud Freeman, Jack Teagarden and Glenn Miller). McPartland played on the 1928 recording of "Room 1411". He also moonlighted in Broadway pit bands. McPartland then went to New York City, and played with a number of small combos. He co-wrote the song "Makin' Friends" with Jack Teagarden.

In 1930, McPartland moved back to Chicago, working with his brother Dick, in a group called the Embassy Four. He was then a bandleader, singer, and master-of-ceremonies at the Three Deuces nightclub. He worked with Russ Columbo (1931–1932) and the Harry Reser band (1933–1935).

During this period, he married singer Dorothy Williams, who along with her sister, Hannah (who later married boxer Jack Dempsey), performed as the Williams Sisters, and they had a daughter, Dorothy. They soon divorced and McPartland spent time in South America.

=== Meeting Marian ===
During 1936–1941, McPartland led his own bands and joined Teagarden's Big Band until he was drafted into the army during World War II (1942–1944). After participating in the invasion of Normandy, he met his future wife in Belgium, the English pianist Margaret Marian Turner, who became better known as jazz pianist Marian McPartland. They married in Aachen, Germany and moved back to Chicago, where McPartland appeared on Windy City Jamboree, before settling in New York City. Soon, he was part of the Willie 'The Lion' Smith band with Jimmy Archey, Pee Wee Russell, George 'Pops' Foster, and George Wettling. The band won a Grammy Award for the soundtrack to the 1954 film, After Hours.

McPartland encouraged Marian to develop her own style and form her own group, which led to the establishment of her long residency at the Hickory House, with a trio including drummer Joe Morello. In 1948, he and Marian performed at the Brass Rail in Chicago. The stage was so small it barely held the trio, but they grew a large following.

McPartland’s meeting with pianist Marian Turner during World War II marked a turning point in both his personal and professional life. The two bonded over their shared passion for jazz, performing together for troops in Europe before returning to the United States. Their marriage in 1945 began a lifelong partnership, with Marian often crediting Jimmy for introducing her to the Chicago style of jazz. The couple’s mutual respect and collaboration became a defining aspect of their careers, influencing each other’s work and inspiring audiences worldwide.

=== McPartland Quintet and jazz preservation ===
In the 1970s, Jimmy McPartland led a quintet that celebrated the evolution of jazz, performing pieces that spanned traditional Dixieland, swing, and more modern styles. A notable performance in 1973 featured the group interpreting classics like “Deep Purple,” demonstrating McPartland’s ability to adapt to diverse jazz styles while maintaining the soulful, melodic qualities of his cornet playing. These performances underscored his role as both a preserver and innovator in jazz, bridging the gap between its earliest forms and its contemporary expressions.

=== Sweet Home Chicago ===
Throughout his career, McPartland remained deeply connected to Chicago, which he considered the true heart of jazz. He often performed in the city’s storied clubs, drawing inspiration from its rich musical heritage. In an interview, McPartland described Chicago as the “place where jazz was reborn,” emphasizing its role in shaping his musical identity and the sound of an entire generation of jazz musicians. His performances in Chicago were celebrated for their authenticity, blending the city’s historical roots with his innovative style.

=== Collaboration and ensemble work ===
McPartland’s work in small ensembles, such as his jazz quintet and sextet, demonstrated his ability to bring musicians together while allowing each player’s individuality to shine. A notable performance in 1961 saw the addition of a pianist to his quintet, transforming it into a sextet and offering audiences a richer, more dynamic sound. McPartland’s leadership style emphasized collaboration, ensuring that every musician had space to contribute creatively while maintaining the cohesive swing that defined his ensembles.

=== TV work and late career ===
McPartland's outgoing personality and stage presence led him to try acting, resulting in a featured role in The Alcoa Hour episode "The Magic Horn" in 1956 with Sal Mineo, Ralph Meeker, and other jazz musicians. He later performed in a production of Show Boat. In 1961, he appeared on a DuPont Show of the Month musical extravaganza called Chicago and All That Jazz, featuring Gene Krupa, Jack Teagarden, Eddie Condon, Pee Wee Russell, and Lil Armstrong.

McPartland performed as guest star with many bands and at festivals during the 1970s in the US and out of the country. The McPartlands divorced in 1970. They continued to work together, remained friends, and remarried a few weeks before Jimmy's death.

In addition to his musical performances, McPartland became a beloved figure in the Long Island jazz scene during the later years of his life. He frequently performed at local venues, often collaborating with younger musicians and mentoring them. In a 1980 interview, McPartland emphasized the importance of keeping traditional jazz alive, stating that sharing the joy of Dixieland music with new audiences was one of his greatest pleasures. His efforts helped foster a vibrant jazz community on Long Island, earning him widespread admiration from fans and fellow artists.

He died of lung cancer in Port Washington, New York, in 1991, two days before his 84th birthday.

== Style and technique ==
McPartland’s cornet style was rooted in the Chicago jazz tradition, characterized by its lyrical phrasing and emotional depth. His performances were marked by a rich, warm tone and a strong sense of swing, which allowed him to connect deeply with his audiences. In his later years, McPartland’s playing retained the improvisational energy of his early career while incorporating elements of swing and contemporary jazz, showcasing his versatility and enduring influence.

== Legacy ==
McPartland’s dedication to preserving traditional jazz extended beyond his performances. He was instrumental in establishing jazz as a staple in community arts programs on Long Island, working with local schools and cultural organizations to introduce young audiences to the genre. His legacy lives on through these programs, which continue to inspire new generations of jazz musicians.In a 1991 tribute, The New York Times described McPartland as a "link to the formative years of jazz," underscoring his importance as both a performer and a historian of the genre. His cornet playing, deeply rooted in the Chicago style, was celebrated for its warmth, clarity, and emotional resonance, qualities that made him a beloved figure among fans and fellow musicians alike.

The 1973 performance by the McPartland Quintet was lauded as a tribute to jazz’s rich history, with critics praising McPartland’s ability to honor tradition while embracing innovation. His dedication to performing and teaching multiple eras of jazz ensured that its legacy remained vibrant for future generations.

The Los Angeles Times described McPartland as a pivotal figure in the evolution of Chicago jazz, praising his ability to bridge the gap between traditional and modern styles. His impact extended beyond his performances, as he actively promoted jazz education and served as a mentor to younger musicians. McPartland’s contributions ensured that the Chicago jazz tradition remained vibrant and relevant in an ever-changing musical landscape.

Marian McPartland often spoke of Jimmy’s profound influence on her development as a jazz musician, highlighting his ability to balance technical mastery with emotional depth. Their relationship not only enriched their individual careers but also symbolized the collaborative spirit of jazz. Jimmy’s mentorship of Marian and their shared performances left a lasting imprint on the jazz world.

As a pioneer of Chicago jazz, McPartland’s contributions to the genre extended beyond his performances. He actively participated in the jazz revival movement of the mid-20th century, working to reintroduce classic jazz to new audiences.Howard Reich described McPartland as a “living link” to Chicago’s jazz heritage, praising his ability to embody the spirit of the city’s jazz traditions while mentoring younger musicians. Through his dedication to preserving Chicago’s unique jazz identity, McPartland ensured that the genre remained a vital part of the city’s cultural landscape.

McPartland’s skill as a bandleader and collaborator was a key part of his legacy. His ensembles not only showcased his own cornet expertise but also nurtured the talents of countless musicians, many of whom went on to have significant careers of their own. Critics praised his ability to craft performances that balanced individual expression with ensemble unity, a hallmark of his contribution to jazz.

== Honors ==
McPartland’s contributions to jazz earned him numerous accolades during his lifetime, including his induction into the Big Band and Jazz Hall of Fame in 1992. His influence extended far beyond his performances, inspiring countless musicians and helping to cement Chicago jazz as a cornerstone of American music history.

== Discography ==
=== As leader ===
- After Hours (Grand Award, 1956)
- Dixieland Now and Then (Jazztone, 1956)
- The Middle Road (Jazztone, 1956)
- The Music Man Goes Dixieland (Epic, 1958)
- Play TV Themes with Marian McPartland (Design, 1960)
- That Happy Dixieland Jazz (RCA, 1960)
- Meet Me in Chicago with Art Hodes (Mercury, 1960)
- Dixieland! (Harmony, 1968)
- The McPartlands Live at the Monticello with Marian McPartland (Halcyon, 1972)
- Swingin (Halcyon, 1973)
- Wanted! (Improv, 1977)
- Tony Bennett/The McPartlands and Friends Make Magnificent Music (Improv, 1977)
- One Night Stand (Jazzology, 1986)
- On Stage (Jazzology, 2001)
- Jazzmeeting in Holland with Bud Freeman, Ted Easton (Circle, 2003)
- Chicagoans Live in Concert (Jazzology, 2006)

=== As sideman ===
- Bix Beiderbecke, Bix Beiderbecke and the Chicago Cornets (Milestone, 1992)
- Ben Pollack, Futuristic Rhythm (Halcyon, 1988)
- George Wein, The Magic Horn (RCA Victor, 1956)
- Jack Teagarden, King of the Blues Trombone (Epic, 1963)
