= Alberta Hunter =

American jazz-blues singer-songwriter (1895–1984)

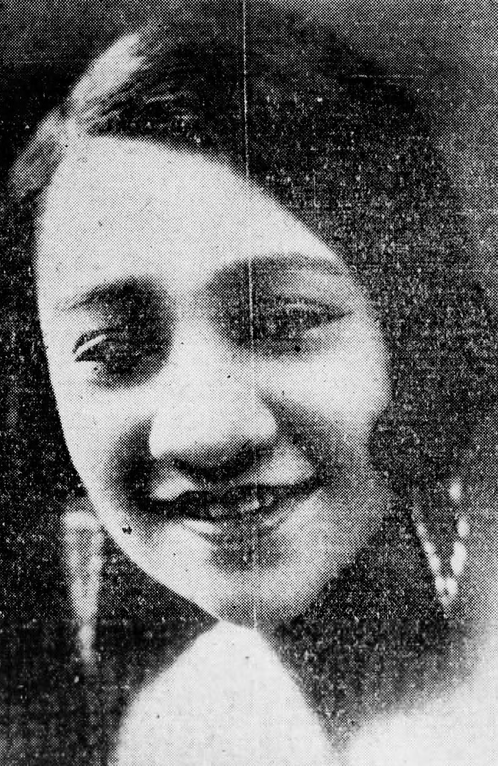
- Hunter, from a 1930 newspaper

Background information
- Also known as: May Alix, Josephine Beatty
- Born: April 1, 1895; Memphis, Tennessee, US
- Died: October 17, 1984 (aged 89) Roosevelt Island, New York, US
- Genres: Jazz, blues
- Occupation: Singer
- Years active: 1914–1984
- Labels: Black Swan, Paramount, Gennett, OKeh, Victor, Columbia, Decca, Bluebird, Bluesville, His Master's Voice

Alberta Hunter (April 1, 1895 – October 17, 1984) was an American jazz and blues singer and songwriter from the early 1920s to the late 1950s. After twenty years of working as a nurse, Hunter resumed her singing career in 1977.

== Early life ==
Hunter was born in Memphis, Tennessee, to Laura Peterson, who worked as a maid in a Memphis brothel, and Charles Hunter, a Pullman porter. Hunter said she never knew her father. She attended Grant Elementary School, off Auction Street, which she called Auction School, in Memphis. She attended school until around age 15.

Hunter had a difficult childhood. Her father left when she was a child, and to support the family her mother worked as a servant in a brothel in Memphis, although she married again in 1906. Hunter was not happy with her new family and left for Chicago, Illinois, around the age of 11, in the hopes of becoming a paid singer; she had heard that it paid 10 dollars per week. Instead of finding a job as a singer she had to earn money by working at a boardinghouse that paid six dollars a week as well as room and board. Hunter's mother left Memphis and moved in with her soon afterwards.

== Career ==
=== Early years: 1910s–1940s ===
Hunter began her singing career in a bordello and soon moved to clubs that appealed to men, black and white alike. By 1914 she was receiving lessons from a prominent jazz pianist, Tony Jackson, who helped her to expand her repertoire and compose her own songs.

She was still in her early teens when she settled in Chicago. Part of her early career was spent singing at Dago Frank's, a brothel. She then sang at Hugh Hoskin's saloon and, eventually, in many Chicago bars.

One of her first notable experiences as an artist was at the Panama Club, a white-owned club with a white-only clientele that had a chain in Chicago, New York and other large cities. Hunter's first act was in an upstairs room, far from the main event; thus, she began developing as an artist in front of a cabaret crowd. "The crowd wouldn't stay downstairs. They'd go upstairs to hear us sing the blues. That's where I would stand and make up verses and sing as I go along." Many claim her appeal was based on her gift for improvising lyrics to satisfy the audience. Her big break came when she was booked at Dreamland Cafe, singing with King Oliver and his band. In early 1923, she suggested that Columbia Records should record Oliver's band, but when she was not available to record with them, Columbia refused.

She worked peeling potatoes by day in her boarding house for $6 a week plus room and board, and hounded club owners by night, determined to land a singing job. Her persistence paid off, and Hunter began a climb from some of the city's lowest dives to a headlining job at its most prestigious venue for black entertainers, the Dreamland ballroom. She had a five-year association with the Dreamland, beginning in 1917, and her salary rose to $35 a week.

She first toured Europe in 1917, performing in Paris and London. The Europeans treated her as an artist, showing her respect and even reverence, which made a great impression on her.

Downhearted Blues (1922)
The "Downhearted Blues" performed by Alberta Hunter

Her career as singer and songwriter flourished in the 1920s and 1930s, and she appeared in clubs and on stage in musicals in both New York and London. The songs she wrote include the critically acclaimed "Downhearted Blues" (1922).

She recorded several records with Perry Bradford from 1922 to 1927.

Hunter recorded prolifically during the 1920s, starting with sessions for Black Swan in 1921, Paramount in 1922–1924, Gennett in 1924, OKeh in 1925–1926, Victor in 1927 and Columbia in 1929. While still working for Paramount, she also recorded for Harmograph Records under the pseudonym May Alix.

Hunter wrote "Downhearted Blues" with Lovie Austin and recorded the track for Ink Williams at Paramount Records. She received only $368 in royalties. Williams had secretly sold the recording rights to Columbia Records in a deal in which all royalties were paid to him. The song became a big hit for Columbia, with Bessie Smith as the vocalist. This record sold almost 1 million copies. Hunter learned what Williams had done and stopped recording for him. In 1928, Hunter played Queenie opposite Paul Robeson in the first London production of Show Boat at Drury Lane. She subsequently performed in nightclubs throughout Europe and appeared for the 1934 winter season with Jack Jackson's society orchestra at the Dorchester, in London. One of her recordings with Jackson is "Miss Otis Regrets".

While at the Dorchester, she made several His Master's Voice recordings with the orchestra and appeared in Radio Parade of 1935 (1934), the first British theatrical film to feature the short-lived Dufaycolor, but Hunter's segment was one of only two in color. She spent the late 1930s fulfilling engagements on both sides of the Atlantic and the early 1940s performing at home.

Hunter eventually moved to New York City. She performed with Bricktop and recorded with Louis Armstrong and Sidney Bechet. With a vocal duet chorus between Clarence Todd and herself, "Cake Walking Babies (From Home)," featuring Bechet and Armstrong, was another one of Hunter's hits recorded in December 1924 during her time in New York City. She signed up with the U.S.O., an organization set up to entertain America's military troops, in 1944 and was put in charge of African American Unit 342—"The Rhythm Rascals". In October 1944, they became the first U.S.O. unit to visit the China-Burma-India theatre of war.

Also In 1944, she took her U.S.O. troupe to Casablanca and continued entertaining troops in both theatres of war for the duration of World War II and into the early postwar period. In the 1950s, she travelled with the U.S.O. to occupied Japan and Korea, but her mother's death in 1957 led her to seek a radical career change.

=== Retirement: late 1950s–1970s ===
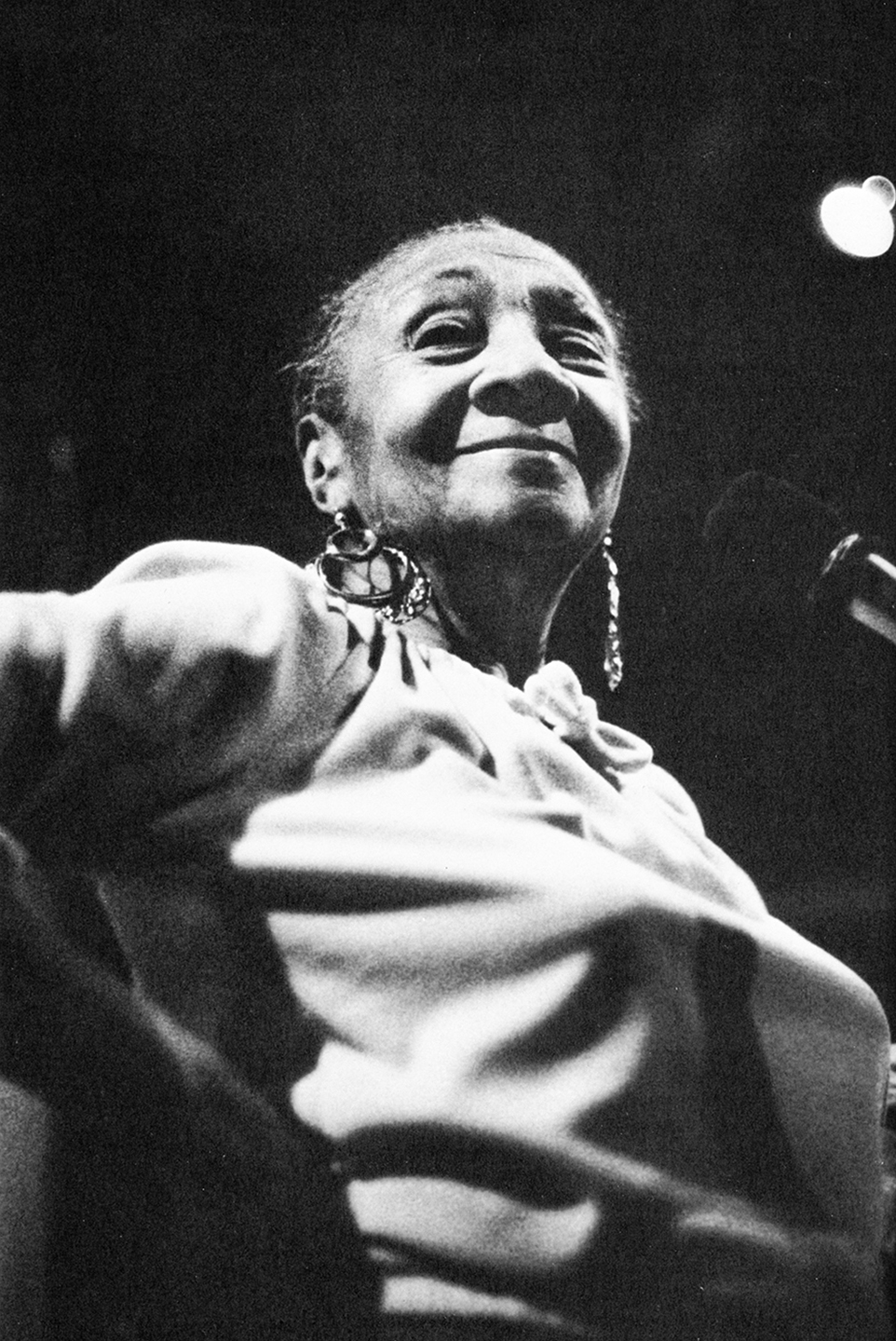
Alberta Hunter photographed by Lynn Gilbert

Hunter said that when her mother died in 1957, because they had been partners and were so close, the appeal of performing ended for her. She reduced her age, "invented" a high school diploma, and enrolled in nursing school, embarking on a career in health care, working first as a volunteer at the Joint Diseases Hospital in Harlem and then for 20 years at Roosevelt Island's Goldwater Memorial Hospital.

The hospital forced Hunter to retire because it believed she was 70 years old. Hunter—who was actually 82 years old—decided to return to singing. She had already made a brief return by performing on two albums in the early 1960s, but now she had a regular engagement at a Greenwich Village club, becoming an attraction there until her death, in October 1984.

=== Comeback: 1970s–1980s ===
Hunter was still working at Goldwater Memorial Hospital in 1961 when she was persuaded to participate in two recording sessions. In 1971 she was videotaped for a segment of a Danish television program, and she taped an interview for the Smithsonian Institution.

In the summer of 1976, Hunter attended a party for her long-time friend Mabel Mercer, hosted by Bobby Short; music public relations agent Charles Bourgeois asked Hunter to sing and connected her with the owner of Cafe Society, Barney Josephson. Josephson offered Hunter a limited engagement at his Greenwich Village club, The Cookery. Her two-week appearance there was a huge success, turning into a six-year engagement and a revival of her career in music.

Impressed with the attention paid her by the press, John Hammond signed Hunter to Columbia Records. He had not previously shown interest in Hunter, but he had been a close associate of Barney Josephson decades earlier, when the latter ran the Café Society Uptown and Downtown clubs. Her Columbia albums, The Glory of Alberta Hunter, Amtrak Blues (on which she sang the jazz classic "Darktown Strutters' Ball"), and Look For the Silver Lining, did not sell as well as expected, but sales were nevertheless healthy. There were also numerous appearances on television programs, including To Tell the Truth (in which panelist Kitty Carlisle had to recuse herself, the two having known each other in Hunter's heyday). She also had a walk-on role in Remember My Name, a 1978 film by Alan Rudolph, for which producer Robert Altman commissioned her to write and to perform the soundtrack music.

== Personal life ==
In 1919, Hunter married Willard Saxby Townsend, a former soldier who later became a labor leader for baggage handlers via the International Brotherhood of Red Caps, but the marriage was short-lived. They separated within months, as Hunter did not want to quit her career. They were divorced in 1923.

Hunter was a lesbian but kept her sexuality relatively private. In August 1927, she sailed for France, accompanied by Lottie Tyler, the niece of the well-known comedian Bert Williams. Hunter and Tyler had met in Chicago a few years earlier. They maintained an on-again off-again relationship until Tyler's death, many years later.

Hunter is buried in the Ferncliff Cemetery and Mausoleum in Hartsdale, Westchester County, New York (Elmwood section, plot 1411), the location of many celebrity graves.

Hunter's life was documented in Alberta Hunter: My Castle's Rockin' (1988 TV movie), a documentary written by Chris Albertson and narrated by the pianist Billy Taylor, and in Cookin' at the Cookery, a biographical musical by Marion J. Caffey, which has toured the United States in recent years with Ernestine Jackson as Hunter. Hunter's life and relationship with Lottie Tyler are represented in the play Leaving the Blues by Jewelle Gomez, produced by the TOSOS theatre company in New York City in 2020. Rosalind Brown (from the original cast of Footloose and One Mo' Time) plays the role of Alberta Hunter in Leaving the Blues.

Hunter was inducted to the Blues Hall of Fame in 2011 and the Memphis Music Hall of Fame in 2015. Hunter's comeback album, Amtrak Blues, was honored by the Blues Hall of Fame in 2009.

== Discography ==
  - 1921-23 - Complete Recorded Works Vol. 1 (1921-1923) (Document Records)
  - 1923-24 - Complete Recorded Works Vol. 2 (1923-1924) (Document Records)
  - 1924-27 - Complete Recorded Works Vol. 3 (1924-1927) (Document Records)
  - 1927-46 - Complete Recorded Works Vol. 4 (1927-1946) (Document Records)
  - 1921-24 - Complete Recorded Works Vol. 5 Alternate Takes (1921-1924) (Document Records)
  - 1921-40 - The Alberta Hunter Collection (Acrobat, 2017 4-CD box set)
  - 1934 - The Legendary Alberta Hunter: The London Sessions 1934 (DRG, 1991)
  - 1961 - Chicago: The Living Legends (with Lovie Austin's Blues Serenaders) (Riverside/OBC 1961)
  - 1962 - Songs We Taught Your Mother (with Lucille Hegamin and Victoria Spivey) (Prestige/Bluesville, 1962)
  - 1977 - Remember My Name (Columbia, 1978)
  - 1978 - Amtrak Blues (Columbia, 1980)
  - 1982 - The Glory of Alberta Hunter (Columbia, 1982)
  - 1983 - Look for the Silver Lining (Columbia, 1983)
  - 1988 - Downhearted Blues: Live at the Cookery (Varèse Sarabande, 2001)

== Filmography ==
- Goldman, Stuart A.; Albertson, Chris; Taylor, Billy; Hunter, Alberta; Churchill, Jack; Cohen, Robert M.; Alfier, Mary (2001). Alberta Hunter: My Castle's Rockin'. New York: View Video. 1988 performance documentary. ISBN 978-0-803-02331-4. OCLC 49503904.
- Santee, Clark; Santee, Delia Gravel; Conover, Willis; Hunter, Alberta; Allen, Gary (2005). Alberta Hunter Jazz at the Smithsonian. Shanachie Entertainment. Live performance at the Smithsonian Institution's Baird Auditorium on November 29, 1981. ISBN 978-1-561-27270-9. OCLC 58996219.
