= Downhearted Blues =

1922 song written by Alberta Hunter and Lovie Austin

"Down Hearted Blues"
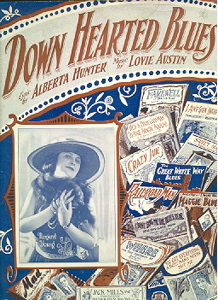
- Sheet music for "Down Hearted Blues"

Single by Alberta Hunter
- Released: 1922
- Recorded: July 1922, New York City
- Genre: Blues
- Length: 3:01
- Label: Paramount
- Composer: Lovie Austin
- Lyricist: Alberta Hunter

Recordings
- Recording of Downhearted Blues, performed by Alberta Hunter (1922): file; help
- Recording of Downhearted Blues, performed by Bessie Smith (1923): file; help

"Down Hearted Blues" is a blues song composed by musician Lovie Austin, with lyrics by American jazz singer Alberta Hunter. The first line sets the theme for the song: "Gee but it's hard to love someone when that someone don't love you."

Hunter sang it during her engagement at the Dreamland Cafe in Chicago, where she performed with Joe "King" Oliver's band. In addition to being sung by Hunter, "Down Hearted Blues" was the first recorded song of Bessie Smith, a blues singer.

Angela Davis describes Bessie Smith's version of the song as being about a woman loving a man who treated her poorly and ultimately did not want to continue a relationship with her, but the woman maintains her dignity despite being upset about the relationship ending and concludes the song with "a bold, perhaps implicitly feminist contestation of patriarchal rule."

== Alberta Hunter's recordings ==
Alberta Hunter recorded the song multiple times, with recordings completed in 1922, 1939, and 1961. The first recording in 1922 was completed for Paramount's "new race series," with more accompaniment in this first recording than the smaller ensembles that were usually present for her other recordings of the song. Although a definitive identification of the band in the recording has not been made, the accompaniment potentially could have been provided by Eubie Blake's ensemble.

In 1939, she recorded "Down Hearted Blues" again, along with five other songs, for Decca Records. Lil Hardin Armstrong, a jazz pianist, joined a small ensemble playing for the record. Additionally, Hunter added a four-bar introduction instead of having the song start with a verse, changed the key of the song, and adjusted the tempo to about 90 beats per minute instead of the original approximately 115 beats per minute.

In 1961, while working primarily as a nurse, Hunter re-recorded the song as part of the LP Alberta Hunter with Lovie Austin's Blues Serenaders for Riverside. Armstrong also came back to be part of Austin's band for the 1961 song, which was recorded in the Blues Revival period.

Hunter also recorded a live performance of "Down Hearted Blues" with Gerald Cook playing the piano and Jimmy Lewis playing the bass when she performed at The Cookery in New York. This 1977 recording appeared in her album Downhearted Blues: Live at the Cookery.

The song appears in the soundtrack for the movie Remember My Name, which was released in 1978.

== Bessie Smith's recording ==
Blues singer Bessie Smith recorded the song with piano accompaniment by Clarence Williams. It was released as her first single in 1923 (backed with "Gulf Coast Blues"), and 780,000 copies were sold in the first six months. One historian noted that "sales through the years plus the bootlegging of her discs must have made it a million seller." "Down Hearted Blues" marked the first of Columbia Record's "race records," as well as the company's first "popular hit." For Bessie Smith, this song represented her "signature recording" that contributed to her title of "Empress of the Blues." Bessie Smith's 1923 sound recordings of the song entered the public domain in the United States in 2024.

== Recognition and awards ==
In 2001, the Recording Industry Association of America, with the National Endowment for the Arts, included it at number 315 in the list of the Top 365 "Songs of the Century." Additionally, the National Recording Preservation Board included Smith's recording in the 50 songs listed for the inaugural National Recording Registry of the Library of Congress in 2002. The board recognizes songs that are "culturally, historically, or aesthetically significant." In 2006, Smith's recording received a Grammy Hall of Fame Award. Finally, the Rock and Roll Hall of Fame has identified "Down Hearted Blues" as one of the "500 Songs That Shaped Rock."
