= Red McKenzie =

American jazz vocalist and musician (1899–1948)

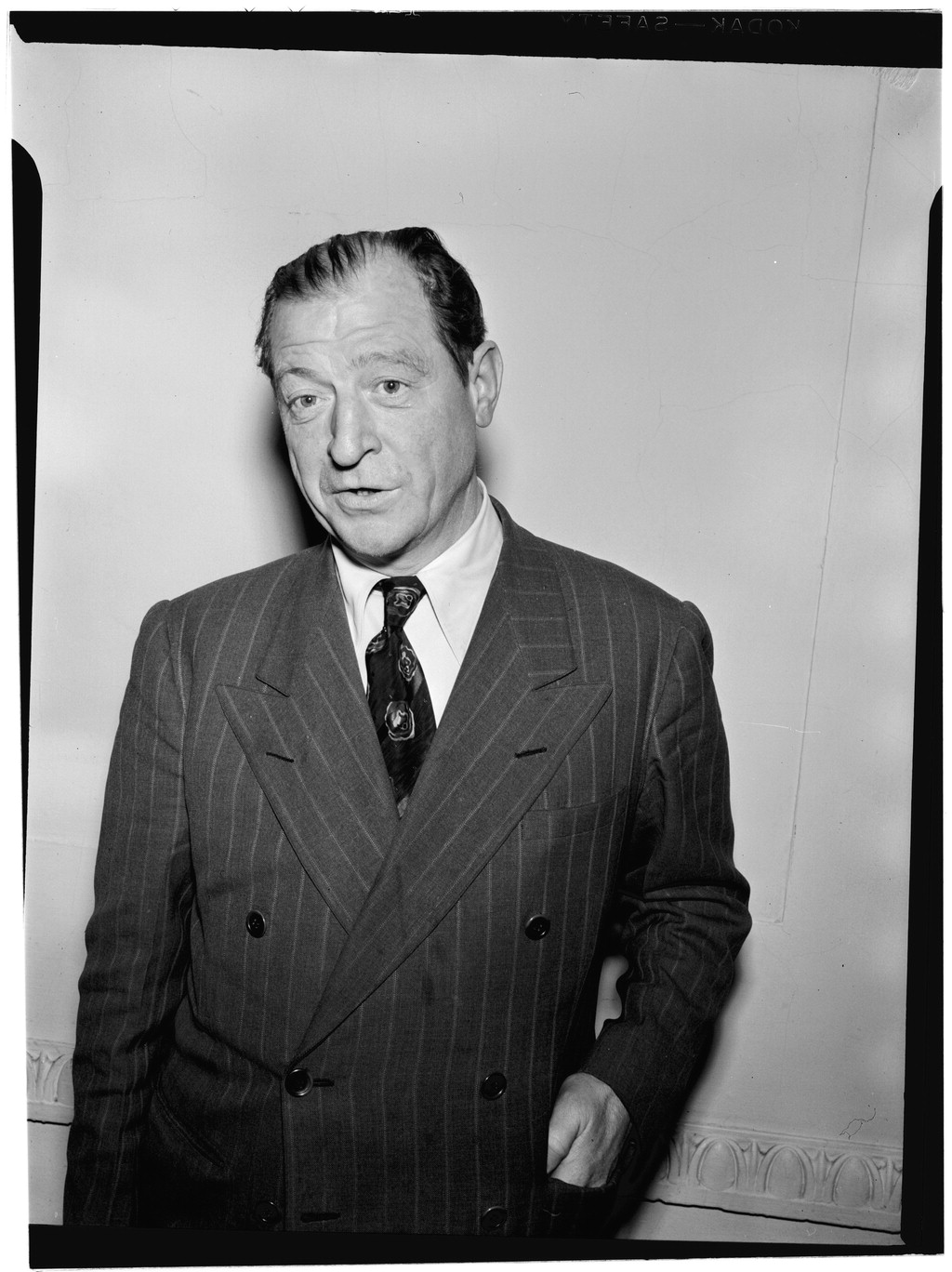
- Red McKenzie, c. October 1946

Background information
- Birth name: William McKenzie
- Born: October 14, 1899; St. Louis, Missouri, U.S.
- Died: February 7, 1948 (aged 48); New York City, U.S.
- Genres: Jazz
- Occupation: Musician
- Instrument: Comb
- Years active: 1920s–1940s
- Formerly of: Mound City Blue Blowers

William 'Red' McKenzie (October 14, 1899 – February 7, 1948) was an American jazz vocalist and musician who played a comb as an instrument. He played the comb-and-paper by placing paper, sometimes strips from the Evening World, over the tines and blowing on it, producing a sound like a kazoo.

== Career ==
He was born in St. Louis, Missouri, United States. In 1923, he founded the Mound City Blue Blowers, with Jack Bland and Dick Slevin. Later they were later joined by guitarist Eddie Lang. The quartet also used the name Red McKenzie and the Candy Kids. In 1929, the Blue Blowers recorded the songs "One Hour" and "Hello Lola" with Glenn Miller, Pee Wee Russell, and Coleman Hawkins. They also recorded with Bunny Berigan, Jimmy Dorsey, and Muggsy Spanier. McKenzie sang with the Paul Whiteman orchestra and in the 1930s led the Spirits of Rhythm and the Farley-Riley band.

In 1931, he sang on "Time on My Hands, "Just Friends" (1931), and "I'm Sorry Dear" (1931). McKenzie played in the Town Hall concerts of Eddie Condon, but retired in the 1940s.

== Sources ==
- Roger D. Kinkle, The Complete Encyclopedia of Popular Music and Jazz, 1900–1950 (Arlington House Publishers, 1974)
