= Nick's =

Tavern and jazz club in New York City

Coordinates: 40°44′3.9″N 74°00′9.5″W

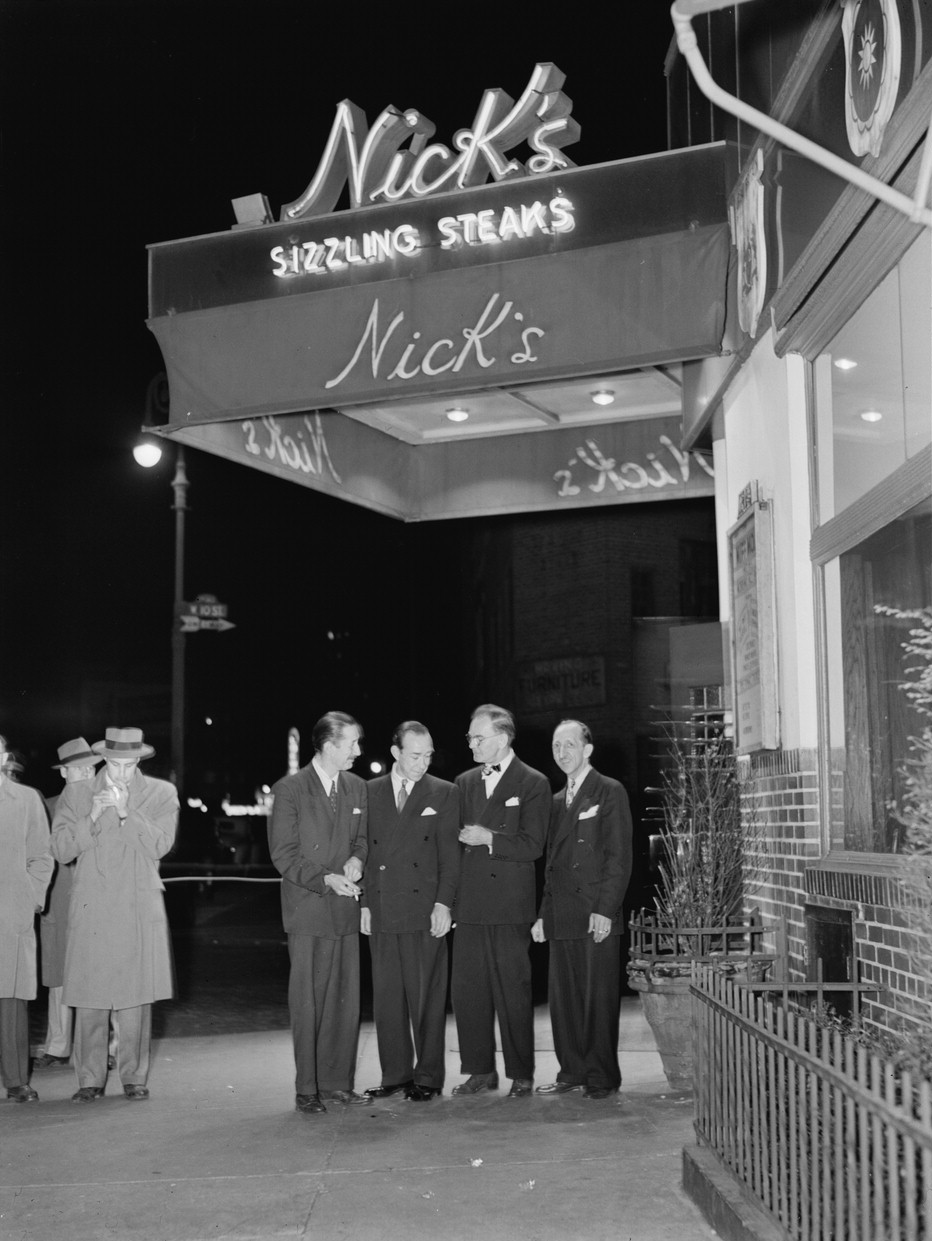
Pee Wee Russell, Muggsy Spanier, Miff Mole, and Joe Grauso, Nick's of New York City in June 1946

Nick's (Nick's Tavern) was a tavern and jazz club located in the Greenwich Village neighborhood of the borough in Manhattan, New York City, which peaked in popularity during the 1940s and 1950s. It was notable for its position, because most popular jazz clubs at this time were located on 52nd street. Nick's, however, was placed on an unusually-shaped property off the northwest corner of 10th Street and 7th Avenue.

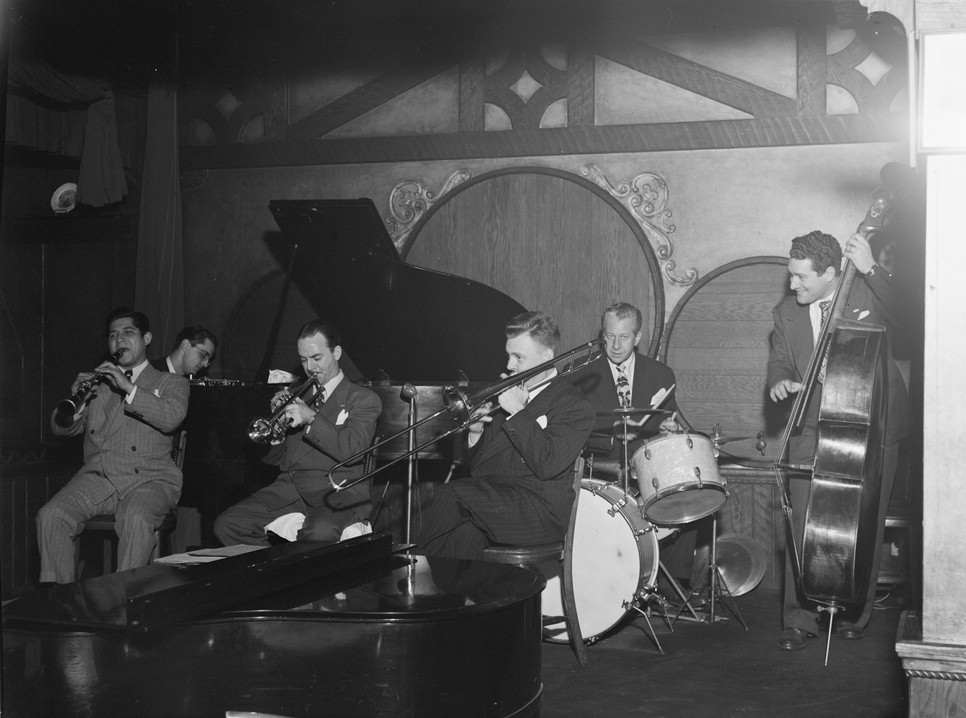
Ernie Caceres, Bobby Hackett, Freddie Ohms, and George Wettling, Nick's of New York City between 1946 and 1948

Many artists performed at the club including Bill Saxton (a Friday night regular), Sister Rosetta Tharpe, Duke Ellington, Billie Holiday, Pee Wee Russell, Muggsy Spanier, Miff Mole and Joe Grauso, among others. Artists like Miles Davis and John Coltrane used to visit the pub to relax after their own gigs. During the early 1950s, the club was noted for its regular Phil Napoleon and The Original Memphis Five Dixieland performances. Dick Hyman, a regular at the club, remembered the club's "Sizzling Steaks," a kitchen specialty, and the signature wall decor. “We used to put lit cigarettes in the mouths of the moose heads, which would drive the maitre d’s crazy,” Hyman recalled. The club had a bar which served soft drinks and alcohol.

== History ==
Nick's was founded by Nick Rongetti in 1922, after 4 previous attempts to open a jazz club in New York. Rongetti was known fondly for his love of Dixieland jazz, which helped the club in amassing a close ring of like-minded followers. Immediately, Dixieland became a staple of the club's sound (so much so that The New York Times once referred to the music as "Nicksieland"). The Nick's style was also influenced by the use of improvisation, as there was no printed music and there were "no rules" when it came to improvising. In the mid 1940s, the term "Nicksieland" was further popularized when Miff Mole, a frequent player at the club, formed an octet called "Miff Mole and his Nicksieland Band." Mole's band consisted of members who played at Nick's frequently, including Bob Casey, Bobby Hackett, Eddie Condon, Ernie Caceres, Gene Schroeder, Joe Grauso and Pee Wee Russell. By the late 1950s, Dixieland music had long since moved out of the public eye, as newer movements like Bebop, Hard bop and Modal jazz grew in popularity. Inevitably, Nick's gradual decline eventually brought it to collapse, and the club was finally closed on August 10, 1963.

== Legacy ==
The closure of Nick's left a hole where the heart New York's Dixieland scene had been, but lived on in the memories of its musicians and patrons. Nick's Tavern was the first notable jazz club to open on 7th Avenue South and helped to spread the influence of Dixieland jazz throughout Greenwich Village. It was purchased and replaced by another jazz club the following year, "Your Father's Mustache," which was eventually replaced again in 1976. Nick's helped to bring jazz to Greenwich Village where other Jazz clubs now prosper, such as The Village Vanguard and Blue Note.

== See also ==
- Blue Note Records – American record label
- List of jazz venues
- Miff Mole – American jazz trombonist and band leader (1898–1961)
- St. Nick's Pub – Harlem jazz club
- Village Vanguard – Jazz club in New York City
