= Bob Casey (musician) =

American jazz musician (1909–1986)

Robert Hanley Casey (February 11, 1909, in Johnson County, Illinois – April 9, 1986, in Marion, Illinois) was an American jazz double-bassist.

Casey learned to play banjo and guitar as a child, playing both in regional ensembles in the Midwest. He began playing bass at age 20 and continued as a guitarist for some time after. In the mid-1930s he played in NBC radio ensembles and worked with Wingy Manone, and in 1939 joined Muggsy Spanier's Ragtimers band. The group soon split, after which he played with Charlie Spivak, Brad Gowans, Eddie Condon, Miff Mole, and Joe Marsala. He played extensively on radio with several of these ensembles. He was also a prolific session bassist, recording with Wild Bill Davison, Bobby Hackett, Cliff Jackson, Max Kaminsky, Eddie Edwards, Bud Freeman, Pee Wee Russell, Georg Brunis, George Wettling, Ralph Sutton, Joe Sullivan, and Boyce Brown in the 1940s and 1950s.

Casey relocated to Florida in 1957, where he played with the Dukes of Dixieland. By the 1970s he was playing only occasionally.
