= Buzzy Drootin =

American jazz musician (1920–2000)

Benjamin "Buzzy" Drootin (April 22, 1920 – May 21, 2000) was an American jazz drummer.

== Career ==
Drootin was born near Kyiv, Ukraine, and moved to Boston, Massachusetts, United States, with his family when he was five. His father played the clarinet, and two of his brothers and his nephew were musicians. He began playing drums professionally as a teenager. At age twenty, he toured with the Jess Stacy All-Stars, a band that included Lee Wiley.

In 1940, he also toured with Ina Ray Hutton. He then joined the band of Wingy Manone. From 1947 until 1951, he worked as the house drummer at Eddie Condon's night club in New York City. He was a bandleader at El Morocco club in New York City, and a member of the house band with his brother Al at George Wein's Storyville club in Boston. During these years he worked with Doc Cheatham, Vic Dickenson, Bobby Hackett, Ruby Braff, Claude Hopkins, Jimmy McPartland, Pee Wee Russell, and Arvell Shaw.

Drootin recorded with Tommy Dorsey, Bobby Hackett, Jack Teagarden, Eddie Condon, Ruby Braff, Anita O'Day, George Wein, the Newport All-Stars, Lee Konitz, Sidney Bechet, PeeWee Russell and The Dukes of Dixieland. In 1968–69, he toured and recorded with Wild Bill Davison's Jazz Giants and then formed Buzzy's Jazz Family, borrowing some of Davison's sidemen (Herb Hall, Benny Morton) and adding Herman Autrey on trumpet and his nephew, Sonny Drootin, on piano.

In 1973, after touring Europe and America, he returned to his hometown of Boston, where he and his brother Al and nephew Sonny formed the Drootin Brothers Band. They played at the Newport Jazz Festival. Drootin played at the first Newport festival and at many festivals after that. He also played at the Los Angeles Classic Jazz Festival in the 1980s.

== Death ==
Buzzy Drootin died from cancer at the age of 80, at the Actors Fund Retirement and Nursing Home in Englewood, New Jersey.

== Discography ==
With Ruby Braff

- Braff!! (Epic, 1956)
- Ruby Braff (Jasmine, 1956)
- Hi-Fi Salute to Bunny (RCA Victor, 1957)
- The Ruby Braff Octet with Pee Wee Russell & Bobby Henderson at Newport (Verve, 1958)
- Blowing Around the World (United Artists, 1959)
- Ruby Braff Goes Girl Crazy (Warner Bros., 1959)
- The Ruby Braff-Marshall Brown Sextet (United Artists, 1960)

With Eddie Condon

- Midnight in Moscow (Epic, 1956)
- Ringside at Condon's Featuring Wild Bill Davison (Savoy, 1956)
- Windy City Seven and Jam Sessions at Commodore (Commodore, 1979)

With others

- Sidney Bechet, Sidney Bechet at Storyville (Storyville, 1974)
- Serge Chaloff, The Fable of Mabel (1201 Music, 1999)
- Wild Bill Davison, Buzzy Drootin, Herb Hall, The Jazz Giants (Biograph, 1970)
- Wild Bill Davison, Wild Bill Davison with Eddie Condon's All Stars (Storyville, 1977)
- Vic Dickenson, Vic's Boston Story (Storyville, 1957)
- Dukes of Dixieland & Clara Ward, We Gotta Shout! (CBS, 1963)
- Bobby Hackett, Bobby Hackett at the Embers (Capitol, 1958)
- Bobby Hackett & Jack Teagarden, Jazz Ultimate (Capitol, 1958)
- Herb Hall, Old Tyme Modern (Biograph, 1969)
- Max Kaminsky & Pee Wee Russell, Max and Pee Wee at the Copley Terrace (Jazzology, 1996)
- Tony Parenti, The Final Bar (Jazzology, 1999)
- Pee Wee Russell, We're in the Money (Storyville, 1956)
- Ralph Sutton, Ragtime U.S.A. (Roulette, 1962)
- George Wein's Dixie-Victors, The Magic Horn (RCA Victor, 1956)
- George Wein's Newport Jazz Festival All Stars, George Wein's Newport Jazz Festival All Stars (Smash, 1963)
