= Marshall Brown (musician) =

American jazz trombonist (1920–1983)

- Born: Marshall Richard Brown; December 21, 1920; Framingham, Massachusetts, U.S.
- Died: December 13, 1983 (aged 62) New York City, U.S.
- Genres: Jazz
- Occupations: Musician, teacher
- Instruments: Valve trombone, bass trumpet
- Years active: 1950s–1980

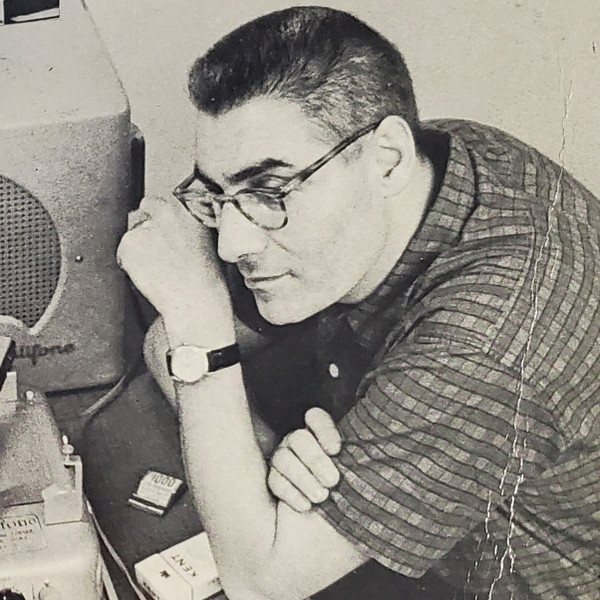
Marshall Brown

Marshall Richard Brown (December 21, 1920 – December 13, 1983) was an American jazz valve trombonist and teacher.

== Career ==
Brown graduated from New York University with a degree in music. He was a band teacher in New York City schools, and one of his school bands performed at the Newport Jazz Festival in the 1950s. With George Wein, he went to Europe to look for musicians for the International Youth Band. In the late 1950s he started the Newport Youth Band. His students included Eddie Gomez, Duško Gojković, George Gruntz, Albert Mangelsdorff, Jimmy Owens, and Gabor Szabo. He worked with Ruby Braff, Bobby Hackett, Lee Konitz, and Pee Wee Russell.

== Discography ==
=== As leader ===
- The Ruby Braff-Marshall Brown Sextet (United Artists, 1960)
- Live at the Chi Chi Club (Avalon, 1970)

=== As sideman ===
- Count Basie, Basie's Beat (Verve, 1967)
- Beaver Harris, From Rag Time to No Time (360 Records, 1975)
- Lee Konitz, The Lee Konitz Duets (Milestone, 1968)
- Lee Konitz, Peacemeal (Milestone, 1970)
- Pee Wee Russell, New Groove (Columbia, 1963)
- Pee Wee Russell, Ask Me Now! (Impulse!, 1966)
- George Wein, George Wein & the Newport All-Stars (Impulse!, 1963)
