= Sam Margolis =

American jazz musician

- Born: November 1, 1923; Boston, Massachusetts, U.S.
- Died: March 27, 1996 (aged 72); Deerfield Beach, Florida, U.S.
- Genres: Jazz
- Instruments: Clarinet, saxophone

Samuel D. Margolis (November 1, 1923 – March 27, 1996) was an American jazz reedist.

== Career ==
Margolis played locally in the Boston area early in his career, with Shad Collins, Vic Dickenson, Bobby Hackett, Nat Pierce, and Rex Stewart. He worked extensively with Ruby Braff between 1954 and 1958, both under Braff's own name and as sidemen for other musicians, including Pee Wee Russell. He would continue working intermittently with Braff for several decades. In 1970, he also appeared briefly in the parade scene in the Dick Van Dyke movie "Some Kind of a Nut" Throughout the 1970s and 1980s, he played often in the New York area, with Ed Polcer, Buzzy Drootin, Max Kaminsky, Roy Eldridge, Tony Bennett, Claude Hopkins, Dill Jones, Vic Dickenson again, and Red Balaban.

== Personal life ==
Near the end of his life, he moved to Deerfield Beach, Florida, where he died of prostate cancer in 1996.
