= Al Drootin =

- Born: December 24, 1916; Boston, Massachusetts, U.S
- Died: January 10, 2016 (age 99) Boston
- Genre: Jazz
- Instruments: Clarinet, Saxophones
- Formerly of: Drootin Brothers Band

Albert M. "Al" Drootin (born December 24, 1916, Boston - died January 10, 2016) was an American jazz clarinetist and saxophone player. He was the brother of drummer Buzzy Drootin and father of pianist Sonny Drootin (all part of the Drootin Brothers Band, formed in 1973).

Drootin played locally in Dixieland jazz groups in Boston in the 1930s, then moved to New York, where he played and toured with Bud Freeman, Muggsy Spanier, Al Donahue and Boyd Raeburn. He did a stint in the United States Army during World War II, then came back to Boston, where he worked for George Wein in the 1950s playing with Ruby Braff, Doc Cheatham, Vic Dickenson and Claude Hopkins at Jazz clubs including Storyville and Mahogany Hall. In the 1960s he played and travelled with the orchestras of Harry Marshard and Ruby Newman, eventually leading his own trio and quartet primarily playing soprano sax in clubs, hotels and restaurants around Boston. After forming the Drootin Brothers Band in 1973, which played that same year at the Newport Jazz Festival, they played together throughout the 1970s at Boston's Scotch 'n Sirloin, performing with, among others, Wild Bill Davison, Roy Eldridge, Bobby Hackett, Zoot Sims, Maxine Sullivan, Teddi King, Ralph Sutton, Max Kaminsky, Jimmy McPartland and Joe Venuti. Throughout those years the Drootin Brothers Band also provided music all over New England for numerous private parties and events. Al Drootin also led Lester Lanin's Orchestra in Palm Beach in the 1980s and 1990s.
