= Bobby Henderson (musician) =

American jazz musician

- Birth name: Bobby Henderson
- Born: April 16, 1910 New York City, New York, U.S.
- Died: December 9, 1969 (aged 59) Albany, New York, U.S.
- Genres: Jazz, stride piano
- Occupation: Musician
- Instrument(s): Piano, trumpet
- Years active: 1920s–1960s

Bobby Henderson (April 16, 1910 – December 9, 1969) was an American jazz musician, who also performed under the name Jody Bolden.

== Biography ==
Bobby Henderson was born in New York City on April 16, 1910, to a single mother, who was middle-aged at the time he was born. He was her only child, and he lived with her for much of his life. Henderson began playing piano at the age of nine, and some years later studied bookkeeping in college. He left college suddenly one day, without notice or regret, to become a professional musician. During his career in music, he was known as a warm, kind and gentle person, who lived quietly with his mother.

Henderson was a great admirer of pianist Fats Waller, with whom Henderson had an opportunity to play, informally. After Waller's death, in 1943, Henderson was regarded as the successor to Waller. This did not occur, as Henderson had largely disappeared from music at that time

Henderson was briefly engaged to the teenaged Billie Holiday in 1934, whom he met and accompanied at the nightclub Pod's and Jerry's, but on December 1 that year the New York Age announced that he was no longer engaged to her.

Subsequent to the termination of his engagement to Billie Holiday, Henderson went into self-imposed exile for over twenty years. He changed his name to Jody Bolden, in honor of jazz cornetist Buddy Bolden who had schizophrenia and died in an asylum in 1931. Henderson was rediscovered and recorded by John Hammond in 1956, and appeared at the Newport Jazz Festival in 1957; a recording appeared on an album shared with Ruby Braff and Pee Wee Russell's group. Hammond had first known Henderson in the 1930s, during Henderson's time playing with Holiday. At the time of the termination of his engagement to Holiday, Henderson had been contracted by Hammond for an important recording session, which Henderson did not attend, and instead disappeared.

Henderson died in Albany, New York, in 1969.

== Selected discography ==
- The Ruby Braff Octet with Pee Wee Russell & Bobby Henderson at Newport (Verve, 1957)
- Bobby Henderson / Sir Charles Thompson / Ray Bryant - Key One Up (Vanguard, 1954–58)
- Bobby Henderson - "Last Recordings CR 122" (CHIAROSCURO, 1969)

With Joe Williams

- A Night at Count Basie's (Vanguard, 1956)
