= Emmett Berry =

American jazz musician

Emmett Berry (July 23, 1915 – June 22, 1993) was an American jazz trumpeter.

Berry was born in Macon, Georgia, United States. He began to study classical trumpet in Georgia, but by 18 had switched to jazz and moved to New York City. He became a member of Fletcher Henderson's band and later replaced Roy Eldridge as soloist. In the 1940s, he worked in Eldridge's Little Jazz Trumpet Ensemble. He also played in Count Basie's band. He is known as an accompanist for Billie Holiday, was in the photograph known as A Great Day in Harlem, and the special The Sound of Jazz.

He died in Cleveland, Ohio on June 22, 1993.

== Discography ==
- Emmett Berry And His Orchestra (Columbia, 1955)

With Buck Clayton

- Songs for Swingers (Columbia, 1959)
- Cat Meets Chick (Columbia, 1956)
- One for Buck (Columbia, 1962)
- Copenhagen Concert (SteepleChase, 1979)

With Johnny Hodges

- Memories of Ellington (Norgran, 1954)
- Castle Rock (Norgran, 1955)
- Dance Bash (Norgran, 1955)
- In a Tender Mood (Norgran, 1956)
- The Blues (Norgran, 1956)

With Sammy Price

- A Real Jam Session (Jazz Selection, 1956)
- Sammy Price in Concert (Jazztone, 1956)
- The Price Is Right (Jazztone, 1957)
- Blues & Boogie (Vogue, 1981)

With Jimmy Rushing

- Listen to the Blues with Jimmy Rushing (Vanguard, 1956)
- If This Ain't the Blues (Vanguard, 1958)
- Little Jimmy Rushing and the Big Brass (Columbia, 1958)
- Copenhagen Concert (SteepleChase, 1979)

With others

- Cannonball Adderley, Jump for Joy (Mercury, 1958)
- Count Basie, A Night at Count Basie's (Vanguard, 1955)
- Sidney Bechet, Sidney Bechet & Sammy Price Bluesicians (Swing, 1957)
- Ruby Braff, Easy Now (RCA Victor, 1959)
- Bobby Donaldson, Dixieland New York (World Wide, 1958)
- Bobby Donaldson, Dixieland Jazz Party (Savoy, 1959)
- Dizzy Gillespie, World Statesman (Norgran, 1956)
- Edmond Hall, Petite Fleur (United Artists, 1959)
- Edmond Hall, Swing Session (Commodore, 1959)
- Coleman Hawkins, Timeless Jazz (Jazztone, 1955)
- Fletcher Henderson All Stars, The Big Reunion (Jazztone, 1958)
- Claude Hopkins, Yes Indeed! (Swingville, 1960)
- Jo Jones, The Jo Jones Special (Vanguard, 1955)
- Red Prysock, Swing Softly Red (Mercury, 1961)
- Buddy Rich, Richcraft (Mercury, 1959)
- Buddy Rich, The Rich Rebellion (Mercury, 1970)
- Pee Wee Russell, Jazz Reunion (Candid, 1961)
- Maxim Saury, Maxim Saury reçoit Sammy Price et Emmet Berry (Ducretet-Thomson, 1956)
- Buddy Tate, Jumpin' On the West Coast! (Black Lion, 1972)
- Joe Williams, A Night at Count Basie's (Vanguard, 1956)
- Jimmy Witherspoon, Goin' to Kansas City Blues (RCA Victor, 1958)
- Jimmy Witherspoon, Olympia Concert (Inner City, 1980)
