= Michael Waddell =

Michael Waddell may refer to:

- Michael Waddell (American football) (born 1981), who played for the Tennessee Titans and Oakland Raiders
- Mike Waddell (musician), a clarinetist, saxophonist, and composer
- Mike Waddell (sports administrator), American professional-sports executive formerly involved in college sports
- Michael Osborne Waddell (1922–2015), British Army officer
- Mike Waddell, one of the Progressive Conservative Party of Manitoba candidates, 2007 Manitoba provincial election

== See also ==
- Michael Waddell's Bone Collector:The Brotherhood Album, an album by Dallas Davidson
