= Swingin' with Pee Wee =

Studio album by Pee Wee Russell with Buck Clayton
- Released: 1960
- Recorded: March 29, 1960
- Studio: Van Gelder Studio, Englewood Cliffs, New Jersey
- Genre: Jazz
- Length: 38:44
- Label: Swingville; SV 2008
- Producer: Esmond Edwards

Pee Wee Russell chronology
Newport Jazz Festival All Stars (1959)	Swingin' with Pee Wee (1960)	Jazz Reunion (1962)

Buck Clayton chronology
Copenhagen Concert (1959)	Swingin' with Pee Wee (1960)	Goin' to Kansas City (1960)

Swingin' with Pee Wee is an album by clarinetist Pee Wee Russell with trumpeter Buck Clayton which was recorded in 1960 and released on the Swingville label.

== Reception ==
Professional ratings
Review scores
Source	Rating
AllMusic	5/5 stars
The Penguin Guide to Jazz Recordings	4/4 stars

Scott Yanow of AllMusic states, "Russell and trumpeter Buck Clayton make for a perfectly compatible team on the 1960 date ... His playing is much more consistent and comfortable on the mid-tempo material than usual and he mostly gets to avoid the overly hyper Dixieland warhorses. A gem".

== Track listing ==
1. "What Can I Say Dear" (Walter Donaldson, Abe Lyman) – 5:00
2. "Midnight Blue" (Pee Wee Russell) – 5:38
3. "The Very Thought of You" (Ray Noble) – 4:40
4. "Lulu's Back In Town" (Harry Warren, Al Dubin) – 5:02
5. "Wrap Your Troubles in Dreams" (Harry Barris, Ted Koehler, Billy Moll) – 5:37
6. "I Would Do Most Anything for You" (Mack David) – 6:07
7. "Englewood" (Russell) – 6:40

== Personnel ==
- Pee Wee Russell – clarinet
- Buck Clayton – trumpet
- Tommy Flanagan – piano
- Wendell Marshall – bass
- Osie Johnson – drums
