= The Ruby Braff Octet with Pee Wee Russell & Bobby Henderson at Newport =

Live album by The Ruby Braff Octet with Pee Wee Russell / Bobby Henderson
- Released: 1957
- Recorded: July 4 & 5, 1957; Newport Jazz Festival, RI
- Genre: Jazz
- Length: 39:13
- Label: Verve; MGV 8241
- Producer: Norman Granz

Ruby Braff chronology
Hi-Fi Salute to Bunny (1957)	The Ruby Braff Octet with Pee Wee Russell & Bobby Henderson at Newport (1957)	Easy Now (1958)

Bobby Henderson chronology
Handful of Keys: Bobby Henderson Plays Fats Waller and Others (1956)	The Ruby Braff Octet with Pee Wee Russell & Bobby Henderson at Newport (1957)	Call House Blues (1958)

The Ruby Braff Octet with Pee Wee Russell & Bobby Henderson at Newport is a live album by Ruby Braff's Octet with Pee Wee Russell and solo pianist Bobby Henderson recorded at the Newport Jazz Festival in 1957 and released on the Verve label.

== Reception ==
Professional ratings
Review scores
Source	Rating
Allmusic	4.5/5 stars
Disc	3/5 stars

The Allmusic site awarded the album 4½ stars.

== Track listing ==
1. "It Don't Mean a Thing (If It Ain't Got That Swing)" (Duke Ellington, Irving Mills) - 7:52
2. "These Foolish Things (Remind Me of You)" (Jack Strachey, Eric Maschwitz) - 4:53
3. "Oh, Lady Be Good!" (George Gershwin, Ira Gershwin) - 7:14
4. "Jitterbug Waltz" (Fats Waller) - 3:33
5. "Keepin' Out of Mischief Now" (Waller, Andy Razaf) - 2:26
6. "Blues for Louis" (Bobby Henderson) - 5:00
7. "Honeysuckle Rose" (Waller, Razaf) - 3:08

== Personnel ==
=== Tracks 1–3 ===
- Ruby Braff - trumpet
- Pee Wee Russell - clarinet
- Jimmy Welch - valve trombone
- Sam Margolis - tenor saxophone
- Nat Pierce - piano
- Steve Jordan - guitar
- Walter Page - bass
- Buzzy Drootin - drums

=== Tracks 4–7 ===
- Bobby Henderson - piano
