= Ernie Caceres =

American jazz saxophonist (1911–1971)

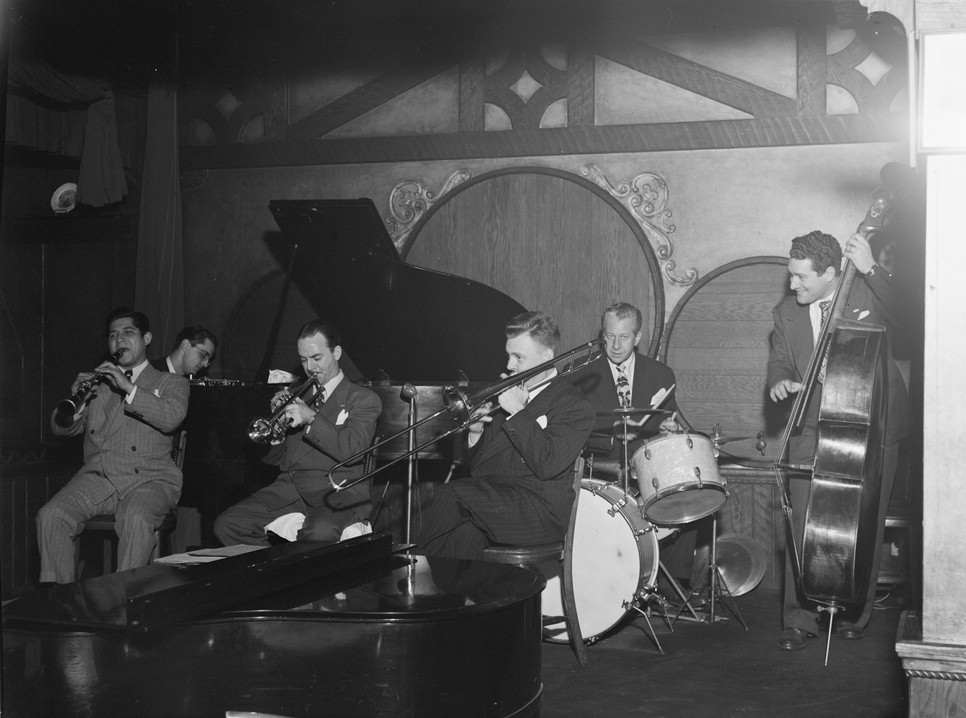
- From left: Caceres, Bobby Hackett, Freddie Ohms, and George Wettling; at Nick's, New York City, 1940s; photo by William P. Gottlieb

Background information
- Born: Ernesto Caceres; November 22, 1911; Rockport, Texas, U.S.
- Died: January 10, 1971 (aged 59) San Antonio, Texas, U.S.
- Genres: Jazz
- Occupation: Musician
- Instrument: Saxophone

Ernesto "Ernie" Caceres (November 22, 1911 – January 10, 1971) was an American jazz saxophonist born in Rockport, Texas. He was a member of the Glenn Miller Orchestra from 1940 to 1942.

== Background ==
Caceres's brothers were both musicians. Emilio Caceres was a violinist who played swing and norteño music, and Pinero was a trumpeter and pianist. Ernie played clarinet, guitar, alto and baritone saxophone, and first played professionally in 1928 in local Texas ensembles. He and Emilio moved to Detroit, then New York City, taking work as session musicians. In 1937 their appearances on Benny Goodman's radio series Camel Caravan "created a sensation and made them jazz stars".

In 1938, Caceres became a member of Bobby Hackett's band, then worked as a sideman with Jack Teagarden in 1939 and Glenn Miller's orchestra from February 1940 to September 1942. While with Miller, he made an appearance in the films Sun Valley Serenade (1941) and Orchestra Wives (1942). Periods with Benny Goodman, Woody Herman, and Tommy Dorsey followed later in the 1940s.

In 1949, he put together his own quartet; playing at the Hickory Log in New York. He was a frequent performer with the Garry Moore Orchestra on television. At the beginning of the 1960s he played with the Billy Butterfield Band. In 1964, he moved back to Texas and played in a band with brother Emilio from 1968 until his death from cancer in 1971. He spent some time in 1965–66 at Mint Hotel, Las Vegas, and the Holiday Hotel, Reno, with the Johnny Long Band.

== Personal life and death ==
Emilio's grandsons are alto saxophonist David Caceres, and jazz vocalist and bassist, Anthony Caceres.

Caceres died on January 10, 1971, aged 59, following a long illness in a San Antonio, Texas hospital.

== Discography ==
=== As leader ===
- Ernie & Emilio Caceres (Audiophile, 1970)

=== As sideman ===
- Sidney Bechet, The Grand Master of the Soprano Saxophone and Clarinet (Columbia, 1956)
- Ruby Braff, Braff!! (Epic, 1956)
- Ruby Braff, The Fabulous Ruby Braff (Philips, 1956)
- Ruth Brown, Ruth Brown (Atlantic, 1957)
- Eddie Condon, Eddie Condon On Stage (Saga 1973)
- Ella Fitzgerald, The First Lady of Song (Decca, 1958)
- Dizzy Gillespie, The Complete RCA Victor Recordings (Bluebird, 1995)
- Bobby Hackett, Gotham Jazz Scene (Capitol, 1957)
- Bobby Hackett & Jack Teagarden, Jazz Ultimate (Capitol, 1958)
- Barbara Lea, Lea in Love (Prestige, 1956)
- Jimmy McPartland, Dixieland! (Harmony, 1968)
- Muggsy Spanier, Chicago Jazz (Commodore, 1957)
- Jack Teagarden, King of the Blues Trombone (Epic, 1963)
- Lee Wiley, I've Got the World On a String (Ember, 1972)
