= The College Concert =

Live album by Pee Wee Russell and Red Allen
- Released: 1966
- Recorded: April 17, 1966
- Genre: Jazz
- Length: 30:36
- Label: Impulse!

Pee Wee Russell chronology
Ask Me Now! (1965)	The College Concert (1966)	The Spirit of '67 (1967)

Red Allen chronology
Feeling Good (1965)	The College Concert (1966)

The College Concert is a live album by American jazz clarinetist Pee Wee Russell and trumpeter Red Allen featuring a performance recorded at the Massachusetts Institute of Technology in 1966 for the Impulse! label. The album would be the final recording for Allen and the penultimate release by Russell.

== Reception ==
The Allmusic review by Scott Yanow awarded the album 4 stars stating "The music is generally relaxed with an emphasis on blues".

Professional ratings
Review scores
Source	Rating
Allmusic	4/5 stars

== Track listing ==
All compositions by Pee Wee Russell except as indicated

1. "Blue Monk" (Thelonious Monk) - 5:49
2. "I Want a Little Girl" (Murray Mencher, Billy Moll) - 6:00
3. "Body and Soul" (Edward Heyman, Johnny Green, Robert Sour, Frank Eyton) - 4:15
4. "Pee Wee's Blues" - 4:08
5. "2° East, 3° West" (John Lewis) - 3:59
6. "Graduation Blues" - 6:35

- Recorded at the Massachusetts Institute of Technology in Cambridge, Massachusetts on April 17, 1966

== Personnel ==
- Pee Wee Russell - clarinet
- Red Allen - trumpet, vocals
- Steve Kuhn - piano
- Charlie Haden - bass
- Marty Morell - drums
