= A Night at Count Basie's =

Live album by Joe Williams
- Released: February 1957
- Recorded: October 22, 1956; Count Basie's, cnr Seventh Avenue & 132nd St., Harlem, NYC
- Genre: Vocal jazz, jazz
- Length: 46:45
- Label: Vanguard; VRS 8508

Joe Williams chronology
| The Greatest!! Count Basie Plays, Joe Williams Sings Standards (1956) | A Night at Count Basie's (1957) | One O'Clock Jump (1957) |

A Night at Count Basie's is a live album by vocalist Joe Williams recorded at Count Basie's nightclub in Harlem in 1956 and released on the Vanguard label.

== Reception ==
Professional ratings
Review scores
| Source | Rating |
|---|---|
| AllMusic | 3/5 stars |

The AllMusic review by Buce Eder stated " This may possibly have been, as claimed, the first authorized commercial recording ever done from a neighborhood bar (complete with the sounds of telephones, cash registers, etc., in the distant background), and the results are priceless ... The sound is remarkably clean and sharp, which makes the fact that the band was incredibly "on" that night even more appreciated".

== Track listing ==
1. "(Back Home Again in) Indiana" (James F. Hanley, Ballard MacDonald) – 7:33
2. "More Than One for My Baby" (Joe Turner) – 7:25
3. "Too Marvelous for Words" (Richard A. Whiting, Johnny Mercer) – 5:28
4. "Sent for You Yesterday (And Here You Come Today)" (Count Basie, Eddie Durham, Jimmy Rushing) – 2:33
5. "Perdido" (Juan Tizol, Ervin Drake, Hans Lengsfelder) – 6:24
6. "I Want a Little Girl" (Murray Mencher, Billy Moll) – 4:28
7. "Please Don't Talk About Me When I'm Gone" (Sam H. Stept, Sidney Clare) – 3:39
8. "Canadian Sunset" (Eddie Heywood, Norman Gimbel) – 9:15

== Personnel ==
- Joe Williams – vocals
- Emmett Berry – trumpet
- Vic Dickenson – trombone
- Bobby Henderson – piano
- Marlowe Morris – organ
- Aaron Bell – bass
- Bobby Donaldson – drums
