= Jazz Reunion =

Studio album by Pee Wee Russell and Coleman Hawkins
- Released: 1961
- Recorded: February 23, 1961
- Studio: Nola Penthouse Studios, New York City, NY
- Genre: Jazz
- Length: 45:34
- Label: Candid; CJM 8020/CJS 9020
- Producer: Nat Hentoff

Coleman Hawkins chronology
Night Hawk (1961)	Jazz Reunion (1961)	The Hawk Relaxes (1961)

Pee Wee Russell chronology
Swingin' with Pee Wee (1960)	Jazz Reunion (1961)	Things Ain't What They Used to Be (1961)

Jazz Reunion is an album by saxophonist Coleman Hawkins and clarinetist Pee Wee Russell which was recorded in 1961 and released on the Candid label.

== Reception ==
Professional ratings
Review scores
Source	Rating
Allmusic	4.5/5 stars

Allmusic reviewer Scott Yanow stated: "Russell was beginning to perform much more modern material than the Dixieland music ... Hawkins is also in fine form and this somewhat surprising program is quite successful".

== Track listing ==
1. "If I Could Be with You (One Hour Tonight)" (James P. Johnson, Henry Creamer) – 6:30
2. "Tin Tin Deo" (Chano Pozo, Gil Fuller) – 8:57
3. "Mariooch" (Pee Wee Russell, Nat Pierce, Milt Hinton) – 7:21
4. "All Too Soon" (Duke Ellington, Carl Sigman) – 7:34
5. "28th and 8th" (Russell, Pierce) – 7:27
6. "What Am I Here For?" (Ellington, Frankie Laine) – 7:54

== Personnel ==
- Pee Wee Russell – clarinet
- Coleman Hawkins – tenor saxophone
- Bob Brookmeyer – valve trombone
- Emmett Berry – trumpet
- Nat Pierce – piano
- Milt Hinton – bass
- Jo Jones - drums
