= Copenhagen Concert =

Live album by Buck Clayton All Stars featuring Jimmy Rushing
- Released: 1979
- Recorded: September 17, 1959
- Venue: Copenhagen, Denmark
- Genre: Jazz
- Length: 85:42
- Label: SteepleChase; SCC-6006/7
- Producer: Nils Winther

Buck Clayton chronology
Newport Jazz Festival All Stars (1959)	Copenhagen Concert (1979)	Swingin' with Pee Wee (1960)

Copenhagen Concert is a live album by American trumpeter Buck Clayton recorded in Copenhagen, Denmark in 1959 and released on the SteepleChase label as a double LP in 1979. A similarly titled Copenhagen Concert was recorded by Dizzy Gillespie with Leo Wright in 1960.

== Critical reception ==
Professional ratings
Review scores
Source	Rating
AllMusic	4/5 stars
The Penguin Guide to Jazz Recordings	3.5/4 stars

AllMusic critic Scott Yanow stated "While the group is fine on the first disc playing five instrumentals (including three of Clayton's lesser-known songs), they really come alive on the second CD when they are joined by the great swing/blues singer Jimmy Rushing. Mr. Five by Five not only is in strong voice on three standards and three famous blues but he inspired the other musicians to play some hard-swinging and colorful solos. It is for Rushing's performance that this set is chiefly recommended".

== Track listing ==
All compositions by Buck Clayton except where noted.

Disc one

1. Introduction – 0:50 Additional track on CD release
2. "Outer Drive" – 7:22
3. "Swinging at the Copper Rail" – 5:20
4. "Moonglow" (Will Hudson, Irving Mills, Eddie DeLange) – 8:05
5. "Night Train" (Jimmy Forrest, Lewis Simpkins, Oscar Washington) – 13:16
6. "Swinging Along on Broadway, NYC" – 9:26

Disc two

1. Introduction – 0:21 Additional track on CD release
2. "Exactly Like You" (Jimmy McHugh, Dorothy Fields) – 7:24
3. "I Want a Little Girl" (Murray Mencher, Billy Moll) – 5:47
4. "Every Day I Have the Blues" (Memphis Slim) – 6:56
5. "'Deed I Do" (Fred Rose, Walter Hirsch) – 6:29
6. "Goin' to Chicago" (Count Basie, Jimmy Rushing) – 5:07
7. "Sent for You Yesterday" (Basie, Eddie Durham, Rushing) – 8:01

== Personnel ==
- Buck Clayton, Emmett Berry – trumpet
- Dicky Wells – trombone
- Earle Warren – alto saxophone, clarinet
- Buddy Tate – tenor saxophone
- Al Williams – piano
- Gene Ramey – bass
- Herbie Lovelle – drums
- Jimmy Rushing – vocals (Disc two)
