= George Wein & the Newport All-Stars =

Studio album by George Wein
- Released: 1963
- Recorded: October 12, 1962
- Genre: Dixieland
- Length: 37:57
- Label: Impulse! A/AS 31
- Producer: Bob Thiele

George Wein chronology
Midnight Concert in Paris (1962)	George Wein & the Newport All-Stars (1963)	George Wein is Alive and Well in Mexico (1967)

George Wein & the Newport All-Stars is an album by the American jazz pianist and entrepreneur George Wein featuring performances recorded in 1962 for the Impulse! label.

== Reception ==
The AllMusic review by Scott Yanow stated: "this definitive set features one of the strongest versions of George Wein's Newport All-Stars... Highly recommended for Dixieland and small-group swing fans."

Professional ratings
Review scores
Source	Rating
AllMusic	4.5/5 stars
DownBeat	3/5 stars
The Encyclopedia of Popular Music	4/5 stars
New Record Mirror	4/5 stars

== Track listing ==
1. "At the Jazz Band Ball" (Nick LaRocca, Larry Shields) - 4:27
2. "The Bends Blues" (Pee Wee Russell) - 4:49
3. "Crazy Rhythm" (Irving Caesar, Joseph Meyer, Roger Wolfe Kahn) - 2:28
4. "Slowly" (David Raksin, Kermit Goell) - 4:34
5. "Ja-Da" (Bob Carleton) - 2:51
6. "Keepin' Out of Mischief Now" (Fats Waller, Andy Razaf) - 7:14
7. "Blue Turning Grey Over You" (Waller, Razaf) - 3:58
8. "Lulu's Back in Town" (Al Dubin, Harry Warren) - 7:36

== Personnel ==
- George Wein - piano, celeste
- Ruby Braff - cornet
- Marshall Brown - bass trumpet, valve trombone
- Pee Wee Russell - clarinet
- Bud Freeman – tenor saxophone
- Bill Takas – double bass
- Marquis Foster – drums
