= Louis Armstrong and Eddie Condon at Newport =

Live album by Louis Armstrong and Eddie Condon
- Released: 1956
- Label: Columbia

Louis Armstrong and Eddie Condon at Newport is a live album recorded at the American Jazz Festival at Newport, Rhode Island, on July 5 and 6, 1956.

The record is split between Louis Armstrong and Eddie Condon.

== Critical reception ==
Professional ratings
Review scores
Source	Rating
Billboard	positive

Billboard reviewed the album in its issue from December 29, 1956, writing: "Considering the popularity of the two names and the mention of Newport, this should do well enough tho some of the blowing in both groups is not the most inspired. [...] Musically, Condon's group airs a typical brace of Dixie standards with Armstrong on a similar kick."

== Track listing ==
12-inch LP (Columbia CL 931)

Side 1
No.	Title	Writer(s)	Artist(s)	Length
1.	"Indiana"	B. MacDonald—Hanley	Louis Armstrong and his all-stars	3:44
2.	"A Theme from the Three-Penny Opera"	Blitzstein–Brecht–Weill—Arr.: Turk Murphy	Vocal: Louis Armstrong; Louis Armstrong and his all-stars	3:23
3.	"Whispering"	M. Schonberger—J. Schonberger	Louis Armstrong and his all-stars	2:22
4.	"Bugle Blues" "Ole Miss"	Traditional; W. C. Handy	Louis Armstrong and his all-stars	4:23
5.	"Dippermouth Blues"	J. Oliver	Eddie Condon and his all-stars	4:18
Total length:				17:30

Side 2
No.	Title	Writer(s)	Artist(s)	Length
1.	"Bye and Bye"	Spiritual	Eddie Condon and his all-stars	5:19
2.	"Squeeze Me"	C. Williams—T. Waller		7:11
3.	"Struttin' with Some Barbecue"	L. Hardin	Eddie Condon and his all-stars	5:03
4.	"Big Butter-and-Egg Man"	Venable—L. Armstrong	Eddie Condon and his all-stars	5:25
Total length:				22:58
