= Eddie Condon's Jazz Concerts =

American old-time radio program

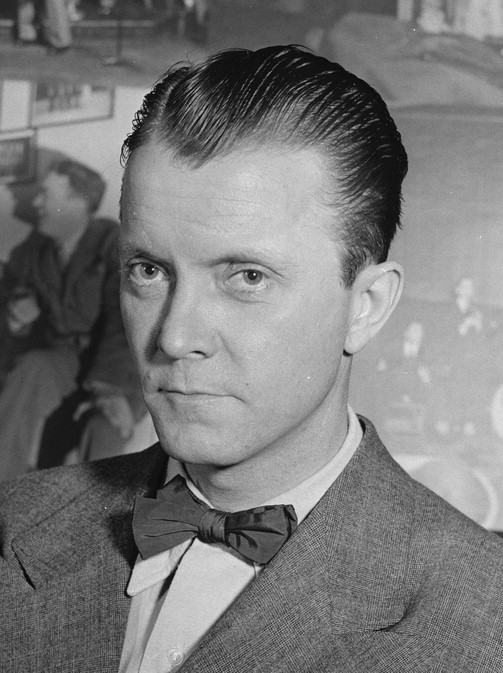
- Eddie Condon circa 1946
- Genre: Dixieland/jazz music
- Running time: 30 minutes
- Country of origin: United States
- Language: English
- Home station: WJZ
- Syndicates: Blue Network
- Hosted by: Eddie Condon
- Directed by: Jack Bland; Addison Amore
- Produced by: Ernest Anderson
- Original release: May 20, 1944 – March 7, 1945

Eddie Condon's Jazz Concerts is an American old-time radio program featuring Dixieland and jazz music. It was broadcast on the Blue Network from May 20, 1944, to April 7, 1945.

== Format ==
In 1942, musician Eddie Condon began staging concerts in New York City, with Carnegie Hall and Town Hall as venues. By 1944, the performances were sold out. In 1944, the Blue Network began broadcasting the concerts, which The Directory of the Armed Forces Radio Service Series described as "Jazz music of a high standard". The broadcasts began "about eight performances into the series".

The program typically began with a jazz song, after which Condon commented on the song and introduced the band's members. The network described the programs as "the only unrehearsed, free-wheeling, completely barefoot music on the air."

== Personnel ==
Condon was the program's host, with broadcasts featuring what the Encyclopedia of Great Popular Song Recordings called "many of the era's greatest musicians". Among them was singer Lee Wiley, described in the encyclopedia as "a near-regular" on the show. The broadcasts found Condon "surrounded by the greatest names in jazz—Louis Armstrong, Jack Teagarden, Willie “The Lion” Smith and Bob Haggart."

Jack Bland and Addison Amore were the directors, and Ernest Anderson was the producer.

== Recordings ==
The broadcasts of Eddie Condon's Jazz Concerts have been made available commercially by Jazzology, creating "jazz's time capsule [that] lives on through the Golden Age of Radio".
