= Ask Me Now! =

Studio album by Pee Wee Russell
- Released: 1965
- Recorded: April 9 & 10, 1963
- Genre: Jazz
- Length: 38:02
- Label: Impulse!
- Producer: Bryan Koniarz

Pee Wee Russell chronology
Gumbo (1965)	Ask Me Now! (1965)	The College Concert (1966)

Ask Me Now! is an album by American jazz clarinetist Pee Wee Russell featuring trombonist Marshall Brown recorded in 1963 for the Impulse! label.

== Reception ==
The Allmusic review by Scott Yanow awarded the album 5 stars stating "It is a remarkable and very lyrical date that briefly rejuvenated the career of this veteran individualist".

Professional ratings
Review scores
Source	Rating
Allmusic	5/5 stars
The Penguin Guide to Jazz Recordings	3/4 stars
The Vinyl District	A+

== Track listing ==
1. "Turnaround" (Ornette Coleman) - 4:14
2. "How About Me?" (Irving Berlin) - 4:16
3. "Ask Me Now!" (Thelonious Monk) - 2:30
4. "Some Other Blues" (John Coltrane) - 3:16
5. "I'd Climb the Highest Mountain" (Lew Brown, Sidney Clare) - 3:26
6. "Licorice Stick" (Marshall Brown) - 3:36
7. "Prelude to a Kiss" (Duke Ellington, Irving Gordon, Irving Mills) - 2:41
8. "Baby, You Can Count on Me" (Freddie Stewart) - 5:01
9. "Hackensack" (Monk) - 3:37
10. "Angel Eyes (Earl Brent, Matt Dennis) - 2:51
11. "Calypso Walk" (Marshall Brown) - 2:34
- Recorded in New York City on April 9 & 10, 1963

== Personnel ==
- Pee Wee Russell - clarinet
- Marshall Brown - valve trombone, bass trumpet
- Russell George - double bass
- Ronnie Bedford - drums
