= The Hawk Relaxes =

Studio album by Coleman Hawkins
- Released: 1961
- Recorded: February 28, 1961
- Studio: Van Gelder, Englewood Cliffs, New Jersey
- Genre: Jazz
- Length: 36:57
- Label: Moodsville; MV 15
- Producer: Esmond Edwards

Coleman Hawkins chronology
Jazz Reunion (1961)	The Hawk Relaxes (1961)	Things Ain't What They Used to Be (1961)

The Hawk Relaxes is an album by saxophonist Coleman Hawkins which was recorded in 1961 and released on the Moodsville label.

== Reception ==
Professional ratings
Review scores
Source	Rating
Down Beat	4.5/5 stars
Allmusic	4.5/5 stars
The Penguin Guide to Jazz Recordings	3/4 stars

Allmusic awarded the album 4½ stars stating "This quintet – as unique as any Hawkins ever fronted – speaks to his open mindedness, but more so to his innate ability in adapting musicians to his situational hitting. The Hawk Relaxes is one of his best latter period efforts".

== Track listing ==
1. "I'll Never Be The Same" (Gus Kahn, Matty Malneck, Frank Signorelli) – 6:11
2. "When Day Is Done" (Buddy DeSylva, Robert Katscher}) – 4:28
3. "Under a Blanket of Blue" (Jerry Livingston, Al J. Neiburg, Marty Symes) – 4:39
4. "More Than You Know" (Edward Eliscu, Billy Rose, Vincent Youmans) – 4:12
5. "Moonglow" (Eddie DeLange, Will Hudson, Irving Mills) – 5:59
6. "Just a Gigolo" (Julius Brammer, Irving Caesar, Leonello Casucci) – 5:04
7. "Speak Low" (Ogden Nash, Kurt Weill) – 6:44

== Personnel ==
- Coleman Hawkins – tenor saxophone
- Ronnell Bright – piano
- Kenny Burrell – guitar
- Ron Carter – bass
- Andrew Cyrille – drums
