= George Wettling =

American jazz drummer (1907-1968)

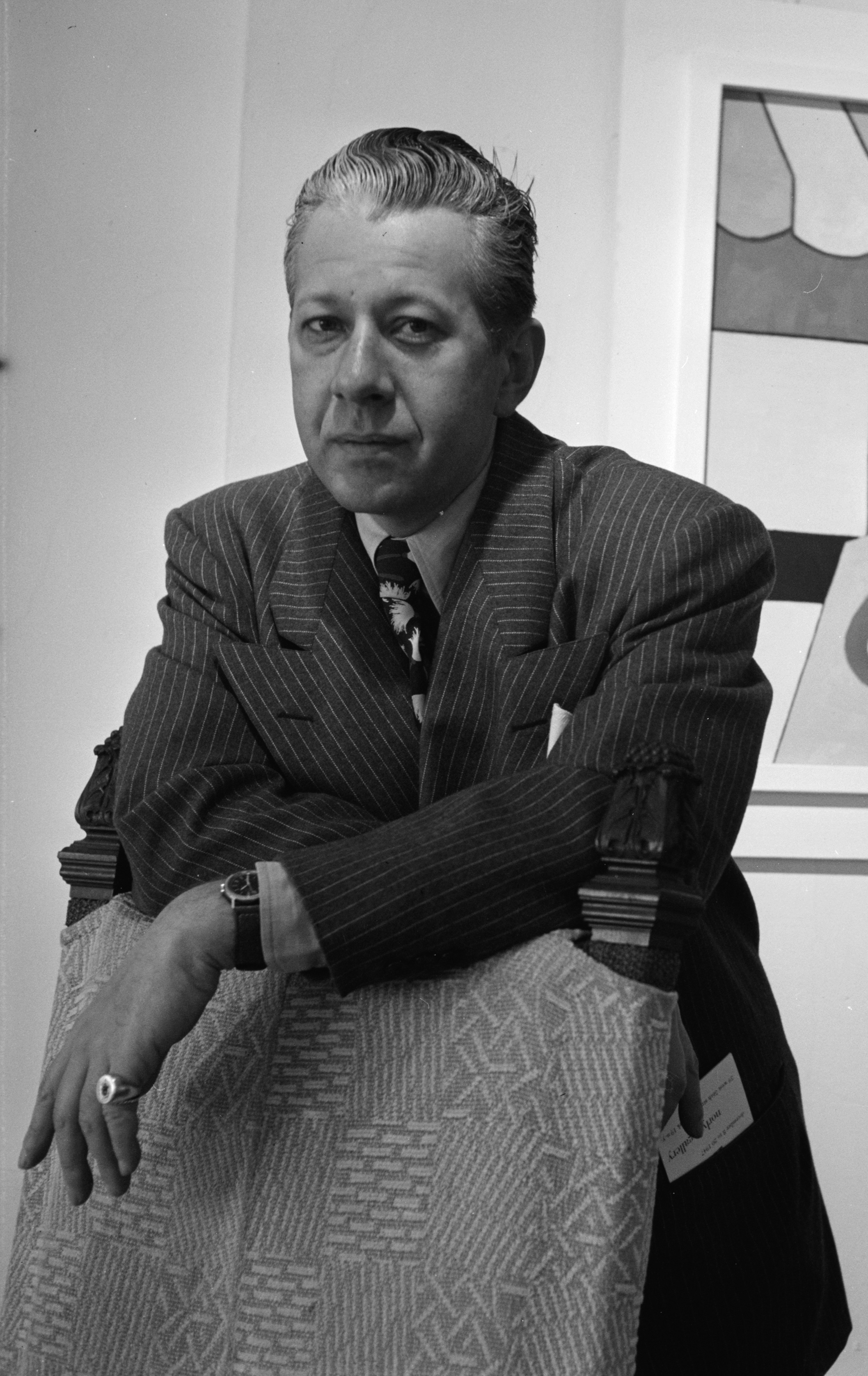

Background information
- Born: George Godfrey Wettling; November 28, 1907; Topeka, Kansas, U.S.
- Origin: Chicago, Illinois, U.S.
- Died: June 6, 1968 (aged 60) New York City, U.S.
- Genres: Jazz, swing, Dixieland
- Occupation: Musician
- Instrument: Drums
- Years active: 1920s–1950s

George Godfrey Wettling (November 28, 1907 – June 6, 1968) was an American jazz drummer.

He was born in Topeka, Kansas, United States, and from his early teens was living in Chicago, Illinois. He was one of the young Chicagoans who fell in love with jazz as a result of hearing King Oliver's band (with Louis Armstrong on second cornet) at Lincoln Gardens in the early 1920s. Oliver's drummer, Baby Dodds, made a particular and lasting impression on Wettling.

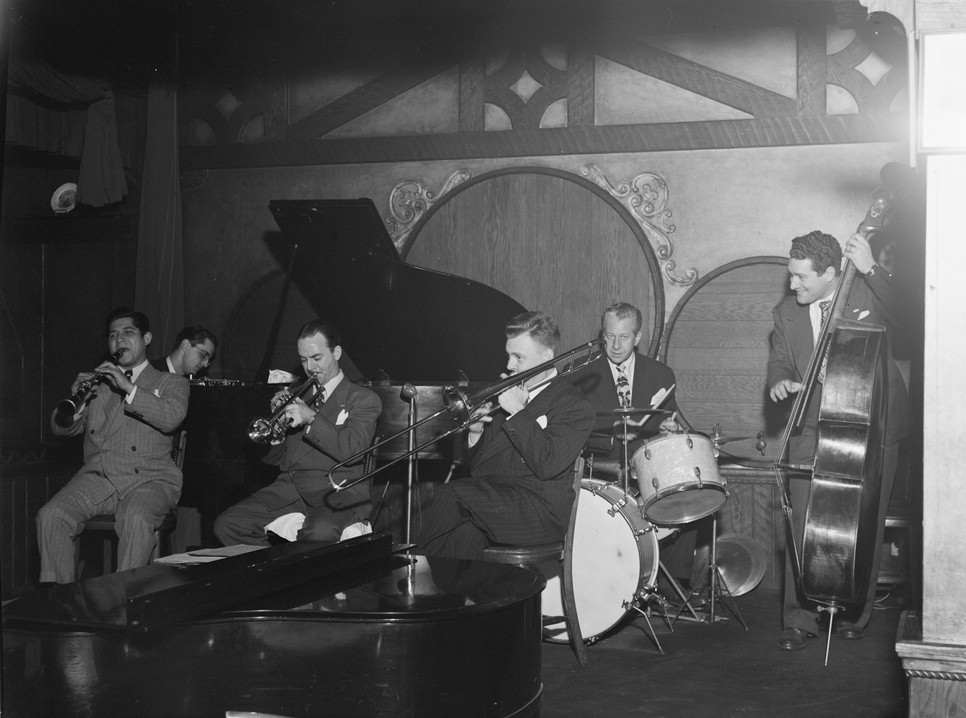
Ernie Caceres, Bobby Hackett, Freddie Ohms, and George Wettling, Nick's, NYC, 1940s. Photography by William P. Gottlieb

Wettling went on to work with the big bands of Artie Shaw, Bunny Berigan, Red Norvo, Paul Whiteman, and Chico Marx, but he was at his best with bands led by Eddie Condon, Muggsy Spanier, and himself. In these small bands, Wettling demonstrated the arts of dynamics and responding to a particular soloist that he had learned from Baby Dodds.

Wettling was a member of some of Condon's bands, which included Wild Bill Davison, Billy Butterfield, Edmond Hall, Peanuts Hucko, Pee Wee Russell, Cutty Cutshall, Gene Schroeder, Ralph Sutton, and Walter Page. In 1957, he toured England with a Condon band that included Davison, Cutshall, and Schroeder. He died of a heart attack in New York City.

Toward the end of his life, Wettling, like his friend clarinetist Pee Wee Russell, took up painting and was influenced by the American cubist Stuart Davis. He has been said to have believed that "jazz drumming and abstract painting seemed different for him only from the point of view of craftsmanship: in both fields he felt rhythm to be decisive".

== See also ==
- A Jam Session at Victor (1937 jam session in which Wettling participated)
