= Bud Freeman =

American jazz musician (1906–1991)

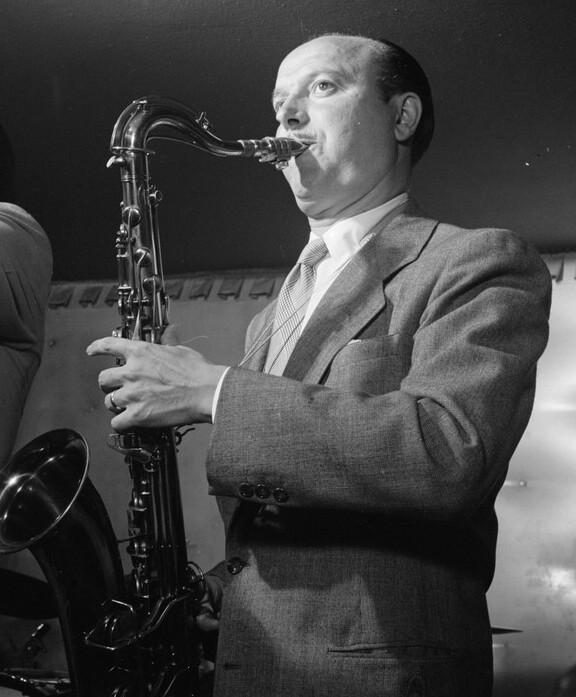
- Bud Freeman, New York City, 1947

Background information
- Born: Lawrence Freeman; April 13, 1906; Chicago, Illinois, U.S
- Died: March 15, 1991 (aged 84) Chicago, Illinois, U.S
- Genre: Jazz
- Occupation: Musician
- Instruments: Tenor saxophone, clarinet, C melody saxophone
- Years active: 1920s–1980s

Lawrence "Bud" Freeman (April 13, 1906 – March 15, 1991) was an American jazz musician, bandleader, and composer, known mainly for playing tenor saxophone, but also the clarinet.

== Biography ==
In 1922, Freeman and some friends from high school formed the Austin High School Gang. Freeman played the C melody saxophone with band members such as Jimmy McPartland and Frank Teschemacher, before switching to tenor saxophone two years later. The band was influenced by the New Orleans Rhythm Kings and Louis Armstrong. While Armstrong was in King Oliver's Creole Jazz Band, Freeman attended performances at Lincoln Gardens with McPartland. They were nicknamed "Alligators".

In 1927, he moved to New York City, where he worked as a session musician and band member with Red Nichols, Roger Wolfe Kahn, Ben Pollack, and Joe Venuti. One of his most notable performances was a solo on Eddie Condon's 1933 recording, The Eel, which became Freeman's nickname for his long snake-like improvisations. Freeman played with Tommy Dorsey's Orchestra (1936–1938) and Benny Goodman's band in 1938, before forming the Summa Cum Laude Orchestra (1939–1940). Freeman joined the U.S. Army during World War II and headed a U.S. Army band in the Aleutian Islands.

After the war, Freeman returned to New York and led his own groups. He also worked with Buck Clayton, Ruby Braff, Vic Dickenson, and Jo Jones. In 1960, he wrote the book and lyrics for the Broadway musical Beg, Borrow or Steal, which included the ballad "Zen Is When", later recorded by the Dave Brubeck Quartet on Jazz Impressions of Japan (1964). He was a member of the World's Greatest Jazz Band in 1969 and 1970. In 1974, he moved to England and continued to record and perform. Freeman spent some time on the Isle of Man and was a guest of Manx musician Jim Caine. After returning to Chicago in 1980, he continued to work into his eighties.

He wrote two memoirs (You Don't Look Like a Musician (1974) and If You Know of a Better Life, Please Tell Me (1976)) and an autobiography (Crazeology) with Robert Wolf. In 1992, Freeman was inducted into the Big Band and Jazz Hall of Fame.

== Death ==
Freeman died March 15, 1991, at the Warren Barr Pavilion, a nursing home in Chicago. He was 84 years old. His death came days after the March 13 demise of Austin High School Gang member, Jimmy McPartland.

== Discography ==
- 1928-38 - The Chronolgical 1928-1938 (Classics, 1994)
- 1939-40 - The Chronolgical 1939-1940 (Classics, 1995)
- 1945-46 - The Chronolgical 1945-1946 (Classics, 1997)
- 1946-00 - The Chronolgical 1939-1940 (Classics, 1997)
- 1939-41 - Battle of Jazz, Vol. 1 (Brunswick, 1953) And His Summa Cum Laude Orchestra
- 1940.00 - Comes Jazz (Columbia, 1940) ×Shellac, 10", 78 RPM, Album
- 1955.00 - Bud Freeman (Bethlehem, 1955) reissued as The Test of Time (Bethlehem, 1977)
- 1945.00 - Midnight at Eddie Condon's (Emarcy, 1955)
- Bud Freeman and the Chicagoans (ABC-Paramount Records, 1954)
- 1927-35 - Jazz: Chicago Style (Columbia, 1955)
- Bud Freeman and His All-Star Jazz (Harmony, 1957)
- 1958-59 - The Bud Freeman Group (Stere-O-Craft, 19--)
- 1957 - Chicago/Austin High School Jazz in Hi-Fi (RCA, 1958)
- 1958 - Bud Freeman & His Summa Cum Laude Trio (Dot, 1959)
- 1960 - The Bud Freeman All-Stars featuring Shorty Baker (Swingville, 1961) with Shorty Baker
- 1959 - Midnight Session (Dot, 1960) with Mary Mulligan
- Summer Concert 1960 (Jazz Archives, 1960)
- 1962 - Something to Remember You By (Black Lion, 1962)
- Chicago (Black Lion, 1962)
- 1963 - Something Tender (United Artists, 1963)
- 1969 - The Compleat Bud Freeman (Monmouth, 1970)
- 1974 - The Joy of Sax (Chiaroscuro, 1974)
- Jazz Meeting in Holland (Circle, 1975)
- Song of the Tenor (Philips, 1975)
- 1975 - Bud Meets Buddy (Cirle, 1976) Reissued as Two Beautiful (Circle, 1983)
- 1976 - Bucky and Bud (Flying Dutchman, 1976)
- Live in Harlem (Cat, 1978)
- 1983 - California Session (Jazzology, 1982)
- 1983 - The Real Bud Freeman (1984) (Principally Jazz, 1985)
- 1974 - Superbud (Jazzology, 1975) Reissued in 1992

With Rex Stewart and Cootie Williams

- The Big Challenge (Jazztone, 1957)

With George Wein

- Newport Jazz Festival All Stars (Atlantic, 1959 [1960]) with Buck Clayton, Pee Wee Russell, Vic Dickenson, Champ Jones and Jake Hanna
- George Wein & the Newport All-Stars (Impulse!, 1962)
