= Newport Jazz Festival All Stars =

1960 live jazz album by multiple artists

Live album by Buck Clayton, Bud Freeman, Vic Dickenson, Champ Jones, George Wein, Jake Hanna, Pee Wee Russell
- Released: 1960
- Recorded: June 1959
- Venue: Storyville, Boston, MA
- Genre: Jazz
- Length: 35:46
- Label: Atlantic; 1331
- Producer: George Wein, Paul Nossiter

Buck Clayton chronology
Songs for Swingers (1958)	Newport Jazz Festival All Stars (1960)	Copenhagen Concert (1959)

Newport Jazz Festival All Stars is a live album by an all star group assembled by pianist/promoter George Wein that featured trumpeter Buck Clayton, saxophonist Bud Freeman, trombonist Vic Dickenson and clarinetist Pee Wee Russell which was recorded in Boston in 1959 in preparation for the Newport Jazz Festival and released on the Atlantic label in 1960.

Professional ratings
Review scores
Source	Rating
AllMusic	4/5 stars

== Track listing ==
1. "Royal Garden Blues" (Clarence Williams, Spencer Williams) – 4:14
2. "Sunday" (Chester Conn, Benny Krueger, Ned Miller, Jule Styne) – 4:41
3. "Dinah" (Harry Akst, Sam M. Lewis, Joe Young) – 4:20
4. "'Deed I Do" (Fred Rose, Walter Hirsch) – 4:47
5. "Pee Wee Russell's Unique Sound" (Traditional) – 4:46
6. "You Took Advantage of Me" (Richard Rodgers, Lorenz Hart) – 5:56
7. "Rose Room" (Art Hickman, Harry Williams) – 7:02

== Personnel ==
- Buck Clayton – trumpet
- Vic Dickenson – trombone
- Pee Wee Russell – clarinet
- Bud Freeman – tenor saxophone
- George Wein – piano
- Champ Jones – bass
- Jake Hanna – drums
