= Dukes of Dixieland =

American "Dixieland"-style revival band

DUKES of Dixieland
- Also known as: The Dukes
- Origin: New Orleans, Louisiana, U.S.
- Genres: Dixieland jazz; New Orleans jazz
- Years active: 1948–1974 (original line-up), 1974–present (new line-ups)
- Labels: Sony Music (current); Leisure Jazz (current); Audio Fidelity Records (original line-up)
- Members: Matt Perronne; Morale Hoskins; Eduardo Tozzatto; David Mahoney
- Past members: Mike Vax; Dr. Ben Redwine; Dick Johnson: Billy Menier; Otis Bazoon; Al Bernard; Jerry Mehan; Bob O'Rourke; Bill Huntington; Frank Trapani; Phamous Lambert; Bobby Floyd; Freddy Kohlman; Mike Sizer; James Snyder; Harry Waters; Mike Waddell; J.B Scott; Richard Taylor; Al Barthlow; Everett Link; Ben Smith; Tim Laughlin; Earl Bonie; Mike Fulton; Jamie Wight; Tom McDermott; Scott Obenschain; Ryan Burrage; Alan Broome; J.J. Juliano; Paul Thibodeaux; Colin Meyers; David Phy; Mike Robbins; Frank Assunto; Fred Assunto; Duke Assunto; Papa Jac Assunto; Jack Maheu; Stanley Mendelsohn; Tommy Rundell; Barney Mallon
- Website: dukesofdixieland.com

The Dukes of Dixieland is an American, New Orleans "Dixieland"-style revival band, originally formed in 1948 by brothers Frank Assunto, trumpet; Fred Assunto, trombone; and their father Papa Jac Assunto, trombone and banjo. Their first records featured Jack Maheu, clarinet; Stanley Mendelsohn, piano; Tommy Rundell, drums; and Barney Mallon, tuba and string bass. The 1958 album “Marching Along with the Dukes of Dixieland, Volume 3,” (No. 6 US) lists Frank, Fred, and Jac Assunto, along with Harold Cooper (clarinet), Stanley Mendelsohn (piano), Paul Ferrara (drums), and Bill Porter (tuba and string bass). During its run the band also featured musicians such as clarinetists Pete Fountain, Jerry Fuller, Kenny Davern, drummers Barrett Deems, Charlie Lodice, Buzzy Drootin and guitarists Jim Hall, and Herb Ellis. The band also recorded with Louis Armstrong.

Fred and Frank Assunto both died young, and the original Dukes of Dixieland disbanded in the early 1970s. In April 1974, producer/manager John Shoup restarted the Dukes of Dixieland with Connie Jones as leader, leased Louis Prima's nightclub atop the Monteleone Hotel in the French Quarter and renamed it "Duke's Place". The Dukes of Dixieland have not been affiliated with the Assunto family since 1974. The Assunto family has denied giving away permission to use the band name with the new line-ups, none of which have included any of the original musicians.

== History ==
The original Dukes of Dixieland were featured on the first stereo record, released November 1957, on the Audio Fidelity label. Sidney Frey, founder and president of Audio Fidelity, had Westrex cut the disk for release before any of the major record labels.

In 1978, the reorganized Dukes, under John Shoup's direction, recorded the first direct-to-disk album, and then, in 1984, were the first jazz band to record on CD. In 1980, they recorded a television special at the old Civic Theater in New Orleans, with the New Orleans Pops Orchestra and later performed in a TV special with Woody Herman, Wood Choppers Ball. In 1986, they invited jazz musician Danny Barker to perform with them at Mahogany Hall to record a television special, Salute to Jelly Roll Morton. In 2001, their gospel CD Gloryland was nominated for a Grammy Award. In 2011, they recorded with The Oak Ridge Boys, in Nashville, Tennessee, titled Country Meets Dixie.

They have performed with symphony orchestras, including the Cincinnati, Cleveland, Chicago, National, New York Pops (in Carnegie Hall), and 29 other orchestras around the world. In 2005, they traveled aboard the Steamboat Natchez up the Mississippi and Ohio Rivers to Cincinnati, Ohio, raising money for the Bush-Clinton Katrina Relief Fund, while many of the band members' homes were still destroyed. In 2011, they performed with the Boston Pops.

Their latest CD, Here Comes the Girls, features music from R&B artists such as The Meters, Ernie K-Doe, and Allen Toussaint.

== Lawsuit and controversy over band name ==
In a commentary to an article published by The Syncopated Times, Deano Assunto, the son of trumpeter Frank Assunto (of the original Dukes of Dixieland) states: "due to a court settlement against John Shoup there is to be ‘no implying any historical connection’ between Shoup’s copy band and the original pre-1974 Dukes of Dixieland [...] Your article also stated that John Shoup says that Freddie’s widow Betty Assunto gave him the rights to the Dukes of Dixieland name which is not true. In our first lawsuit against Shoup he could provide no documents to prove [that claim]." The Assunto family now has a popular tribute band, "The Assunto Dukes, a Dixieland Tribute", featuring Frank's granddaughter Lexie on vocals.

== Band members ==
=== Original members ===
- Frank Assunto
- Fred Assunto
- Duke Assunto
- Bill Porter
- Papa Jac Assunto
- Jack Maheu
- Stanley Mendelsohn
- Tommy Rundell
- Barney Mallon

==== Featured artists ====
- Pete Fountain
- Louis Armstrong
- Jerry Fuller
- Jim Hall
- Herb Ellis

=== Later alumni ===
- 1959–61 – Rich Matteson
- 1966/1967 – Jim Beebe
- 1962–63 – Buzzy Drootin
- 1966/1967 – Eddie Hubble
- 1964–1967 – Barrett Deems
- 1960–1967 – Gene Schroeder

1975–80

- Mike Vax
- Dick Johnson
- Billy Menier
- Otis Bazoon
- Al Bernard
- Jerry Mehan
- Bob O'Rourke
- Bill Huntington

1981–85

- Frank Trapani
- Phamous Lambert
- Bobby Floyd
- Freddy Kohlman
- Mike Sizer

1986–89

- Harry Waters
- Mike Waddell (musician)

1990–92

- J.B Scott

1990–2010

- Richard Taylor
- Al Barthlow
- Everett Link
- Ben Smith
- Tim Laughlin
- Kevin Clark
- Earl Bonie
- Mike Fulton
- Jamie Wight
- Tom McDermott

2011–2012

- Kevin Clark
- Ben Smith
- Scott Obenschain
- Ryan Burrage
- Alan Broome
- J.J. Juliano

2013-2013

- Kevin Clark
- Ben Smith
- Scott Obenschain
- Ryan Burrage
- Alan Broome
- Paul Thibodeaux
- Colin Meyers

2013–2014

- Kevin Clark
- Scott Obenschain
- Paul Thibodeaux
- Ryan Burrage
- Alan Broome
- Joe Kennedy

2014–

- Kevin Clark
- Ryan Burrage
- Alan Broome
- Joe Kennedy
- David Mahoney
- David Phy

2016–2020

- Kevin Clark
- Owen Callahan
- Mike Robbins
- Joe Kennedy
- David Mahoney
- Wes Anderson IV

2023

- Dr Ben Redwine
- David Mahoney
- Eduardo Tozzatto
- Jim Greene
- Ellis Seiberling

2023-2024

- Matt Perronne
- Morale Hoskins
- Eduardo Tozzatto
- David Mahoney
- Wes Anderson
- Jason Danti

==== Guest/featured artists ====
- Danny Barker
- Charlie Brent
- George French
- Woody Herman
- Moses Hogan
- Luther Kent
- New Orleans Gospel Choir
- Joe Williams
- The Oak Ridge Boys
- Reed Vaughan
- Karl J. Karlsson
- Francis Grinnell

== See also ==
- Italians in New Orleans

== Bibliography ==
- Spedale, Rhodes. A Guide to Jazz in New Orleans. p. 135 ISBN 0-940594-08-0
- Rose, Al. I Remember Jazz. pp. 14, 45, 151, 181 ISBN 0-8071-1315-8 LSU Press
- Rose, Al. New Orleans Jazz (A Family Album). pp. 1, 6, 12, 29, 40, 41, 49, 74, 77, 85, 110, 115, 138, 149, 191, 224 ISBN 0-8071-1158-9 LSU Press
