= Mike Waddell (musician) =

Michael Waddell is a clarinetist, saxophonist, and composer. He is a member of the faculty of the University of North Carolina at Wilmington department of music. He performed in the Dukes of Dixieland band in the 1980s. His 2001 jazz CD, Defining Moments, received positive reviews from JazzTimes and The News & Observer.
