= Eddie Condon =

American jazz banjoist, guitarist, and bandleader (1905–1973)

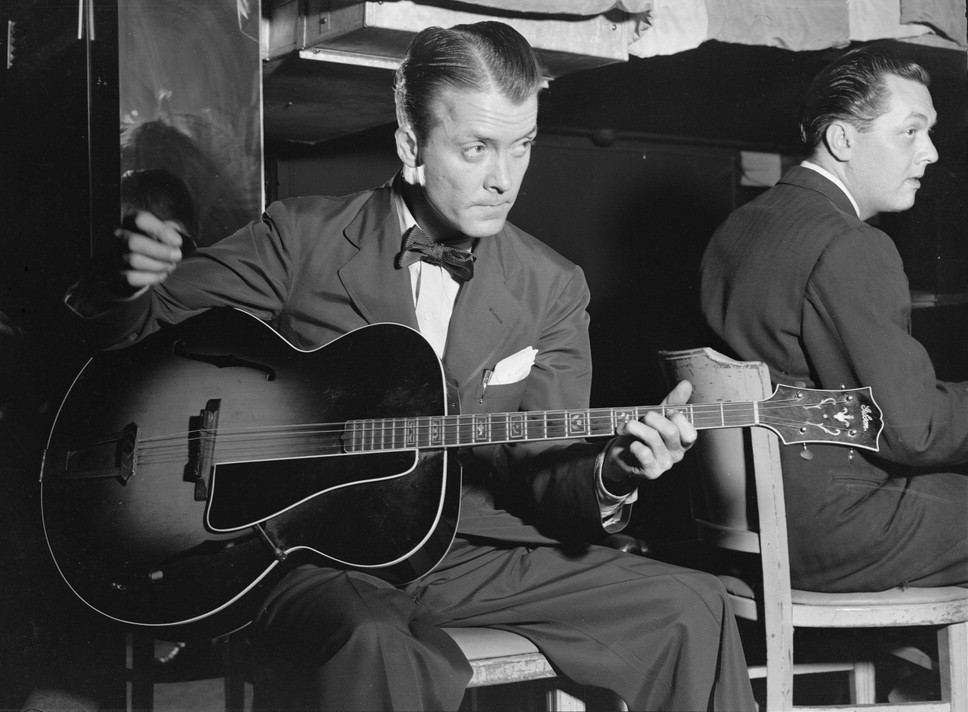
- Condon in 1946

Background information
- Born: Albert Edwin Condon; November 16, 1905; Goodland, Indiana, U.S.
- Died: August 4, 1973 (aged 67) New York City, U.S.
- Genres: Jazz, swing
- Occupations: Musician, bandleader
- Instrument: Guitar
- Years active: 1921–1973
- Labels: Commodore, OKeh, Victor, Brunswick, Columbia

Albert Edwin Condon (November 16, 1905 – August 4, 1973) was an American jazz banjoist, guitarist, and bandleader. A leading figure in Chicago jazz, he also played piano and sang. He also owned a self-named night club in New York City.

== Early years ==
Condon was born in Goodland, Indiana, the son of John and Margaret (née McGraw) Condon. He grew up in Momence, Illinois, and Chicago Heights, Illinois, where he attended St. Agnes and Bloom High School. After playing ukulele, he switched to banjo and was a professional musician by 1921.

When he was 15 years old, he received his first union card in Waterloo, Iowa.

== Career ==
He was based in Chicago for most of the 1920s, and played with such jazz notables as Bix Beiderbecke, Jack Teagarden, and Frank Teschemacher. He and Red McKenzie formed the Chicago Rhythm Kings in 1925. While in Chicago, Condon and other white musicians would go to Lincoln Gardens to watch and learn from King Oliver and his band. They later would frequent the Sunset Café to see Louis Armstrong and his Hot Five for the same reasons.

In 1928, Condon moved to New York City. He frequently arranged jazz sessions for the record companies, sometimes playing with the artists he brought to the recording studios, including Louis Armstrong and Fats Waller. He organised racially integrated recording sessions—when these were still rare—with Fats Waller, Armstrong and Henry 'Red' Allen. He played with the band of Red Nichols for a time. Later, from 1938 he had a long association with Milt Gabler's Commodore Records.

A handful of records were issued under his own name in the late 1920s and early 1930s: a July 28, 1928, two-song session was recorded for OKeh, but only issued in England. On October 30, 1928, an OKeh was issued as "Eddie Condon and his Footwarmers", featuring Jack Teagarden. A further session on February 8, 1929, yielded a record issued under the name "Eddie Hot Shots" and issued on Victor's hot dance series. In 1932 he recorded multiple sessions with the Rhythmakers in New York City. In 1933, a further two sessions were recorded for Brunswick consisting of six recordings, only two of which were released in the US. From 1938 on, Condon recorded for Commodore and one session for Decca.

From the late 1930s on he was a regular at the Manhattan jazz club Nick's. The sophisticated variation on Dixieland music which Condon and his colleagues created there came to be nicknamed "Nicksieland". Condon hated having his music called "Dixieland". He never used the term himself and emphasized his view by calling his first autobiography We Called it Music. By this time, his regular circle of musical associates included Wild Bill Davison, Bobby Hackett, George Brunies, Edmond Hall, and Pee Wee Russell. In 1939, he appeared with "Bobby Hacket and Band" in the Warner Brothers & Vitaphone film musical short-subject, On the Air.

Condon did a series of jazz radio broadcasts, Eddie Condon's Jazz Concerts, from New York's Town Hall during 1944–45 which were nationally broadcast. These recordings survive, and have been issued on the Jazzology label.

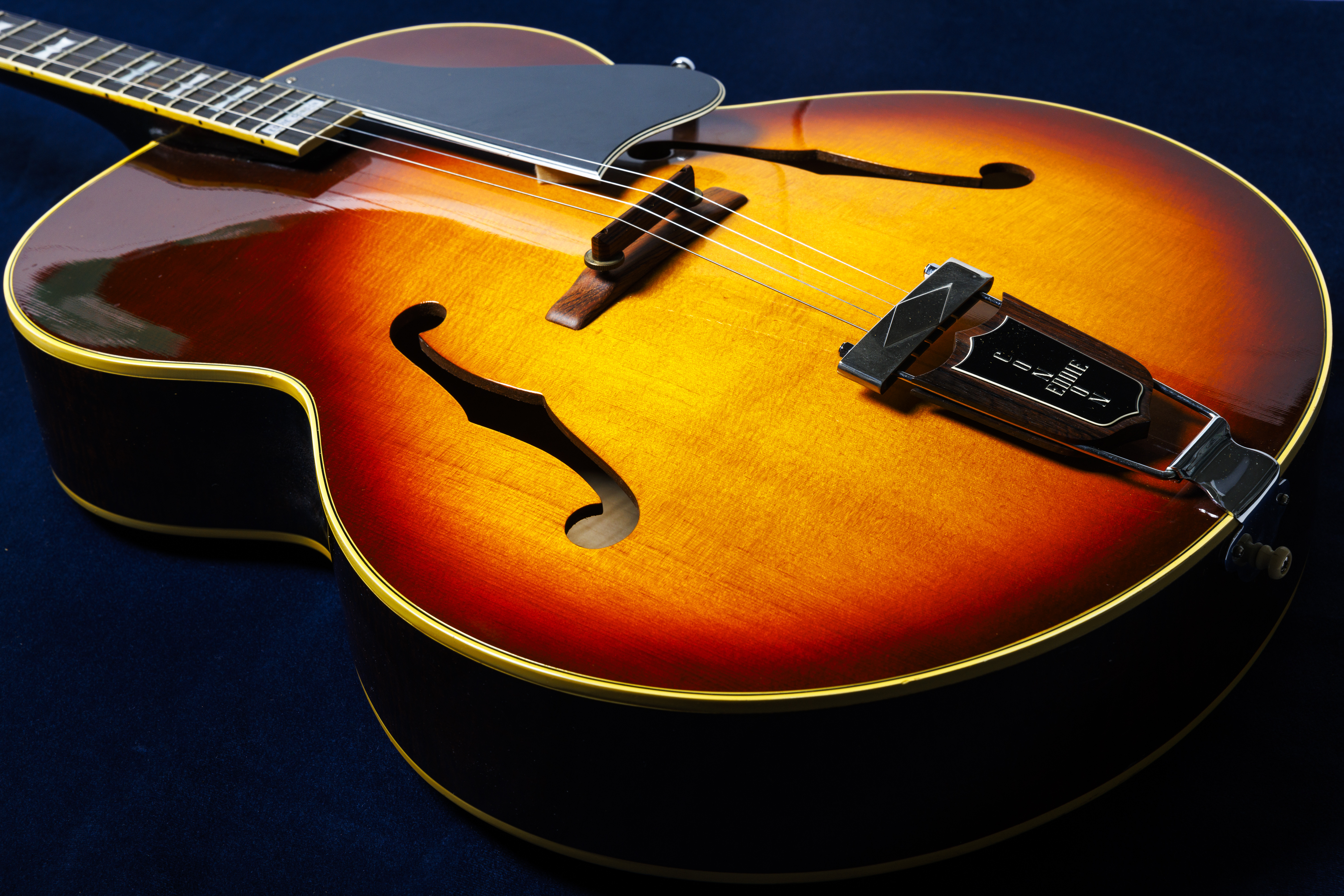
Eddie Condon guitar from the Music Division at the Library of Congress in 2025

From 1945 through 1967, he ran his own New York jazz club, Eddie Condon's, first located on West 3rd Street in Greenwich Village, then 52nd Street near Sixth Avenue, on the present site of the CBS headquarters building; then later, on the south side of East 56th Street, east of Second Avenue. In the 1950s, Condon recorded a sequence of classic albums for Columbia Records. The musicians involved in these albums, and at Condon's club, included Wild Bill Davison, Bobby Hackett (cornet), Billy Butterfield (trumpet), Edmond Hall, Peanuts Hucko, Pee Wee Russell, Bob Wilber (clarinet), Cutty Cutshall, Lou McGarity, George Brunies (trombone), Bud Freeman (tenor sax), Gene Schroeder, Dick Cary, Ralph Sutton (piano), Bob Casey, Walter Page, Jack Lesberg, Al Hall (bass), George Wettling, Buzzy Drootin, and Cliff Leeman (drums).

Condon toured Britain in 1957 with a band including Wild Bill Davison, Cutty Cutshall, Gene Schroeder and George Wettling. His last tour was in 1964, when he took a band to Australia and Japan. Condon's men, on that tour, were Buck Clayton (trumpet), Pee Wee Russell (clarinet), Vic Dickenson (trombone), Bud Freeman (tenor sax), Dick Cary (piano and alto horn), Jack Lesberg (bass), Cliff Leeman (drums), Jimmy Rushing (vocals). Billy Banks, a vocalist who had recorded with Condon and Pee Wee Russell in 1932, and had lived in obscurity in Japan for many years, turned up at one of the 1964 concerts: Pee Wee asked him "have you got any more gigs?".

In 1948, Condon's autobiography We Called It Music was published. Eddie Condon's Treasury of Jazz (1956) was a collection of articles co-edited by Condon and Richard Gehman.

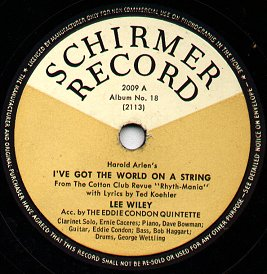
Record label with accompaniment by the Eddie Condon Quintette

A latter-day collaborator, clarinetist Kenny Davern, described a Condon gig: "It was always a thrill to get a call from Eddie and with a gig involved even more so. I remember eating beforehand with Bernie (Previn, trumpet) and Lou (McGarity, trombone) and everyone being in good spirits. There was a buzz on, we'd all had a taste and there was a great feel to the music."

Condon toured and appeared at jazz festivals until 1971. His last public appearance was at the New School for Social Research in New York in April 1973 where he played with several of his regulars. The concert was recorded (Chiaroscuro Records CRD110).

During most of his career Condon played and recorded using a four-string guitar. However he never made a solo with this instrument, at least not on record.

== Personal life ==
Condon married fashion copywriter Phyllis Smith (1903–1986) in 1942. They had two daughters, Maggie and Liza.

== Death ==
On August 4, 1973, Condon died of a bone disease at Mount Sinai Hospital in New York City, New York. He was 67. His funeral was held at Frank E. Campbell Chapel in Manhattan. He was survived by his wife and two daughters.

== Discography ==
In addition to these albums, Condon made 78 RPM recordings from the 1920s to the 1950s; labels included Brunswick and Commodore.

- Ringside at Condon's (Savoy, 1956)
- Louis Armstrong and Eddie Condon at Newport (Columbia, 1956)
- Confidentially...It's Condon (Design, 1958)
- Dixieland Dance Party (Dot, 1958)
- Eddie Condon is Uptown Now! (MGM, 1958)
- Tiger Rag and All That Jazz (World Pacific, 1960)
- A Legend (Mainstream, 1965)
- Eddie Condon's World of Jazz (Columbia, 1971; compilation of Condon and others from the pre-LP era)
- The Eddie Condon Concerts (Chiaroscuro, 1972)
- Jazz at the New School (Chiaroscuro, 1972)
- The Spirit of Condon (Fat Cat's Jazz, 1973)
- The Immortal Eddie Condon (Olympic, 1974)
- The Best of Eddie Condon (MCA, 1975)
- Eddie Condon in Japan (Chiaroscuro, 1977)
- Eddie Condon Wild Bill Davison Jam Session (Jazzology, 1980)
- Eddie Condon and His Jazz Concert Orchestra (Jazz Bird, 1981)
- That Toddlin' Town (Atlantic, 1985)
- The Town Hall Concerts (Jazzology, 1988–1996)
- Dixieland Jam (Columbia, 1989)
- The Definitive Eddie Condon and His Jazz Concert All-Stars Vol. 1 (Stash, 1990)
- A Night with Eddie Condon Kenny Davern with Eddie Condon (Arbors, 2001)
- Eddie Condon & Bud Freeman: Complete Commodore and Decca Sessions (Mosaic, 2015)
