= George Wein =

American jazz promoter, pianist, and producer (1925–2021)

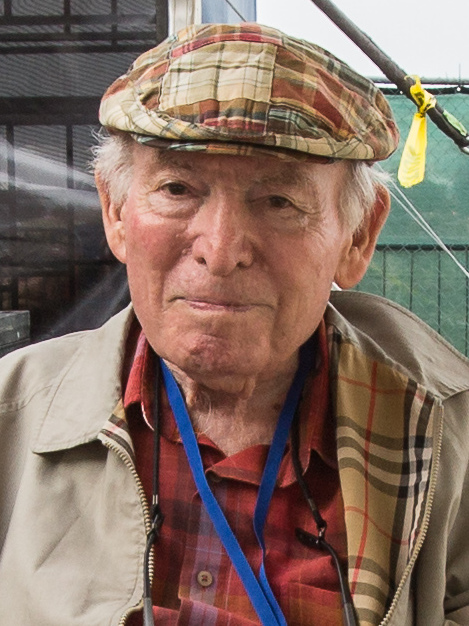
- Wein at the Newport Jazz Festival in 2014

Background information
- Born: October 3, 1925; Lynn, Massachusetts, U.S.
- Died: September 13, 2021 (aged 95) New York City, New York, U.S.
- Genre: Jazz
- Occupations: Festival producer, concert promoter, musician
- Instruments: Piano, vocals
- Label: Arbors

George Wein (October 3, 1925 – September 13, 2021) was an American jazz promoter, pianist, and producer. He was the founder of the Newport Jazz Festival, which is held every summer in Newport, Rhode Island. He also co-founded the Newport Folk Festival with Pete Seeger and Theodore Bikel and was instrumental in the founding of the New Orleans Jazz and Heritage Festival.

== Early life ==
Wein was born in Lynn, Massachusetts, on October 3, 1925. His father, Barnet, worked as an ear, nose, and throat doctor; his mother, Ruth, was an amateur piano player. Both of his parents were Jewish. Wein was raised in Newton and began learning the piano when he was eight. He developed a passion for jazz while attending Newton High School, where he formed his first jazz band. He studied at Boston University, where he led a small group which played professionally around Boston. After serving in the U.S. Army during World War II, he graduated from Boston University's College of Liberal Arts in 1950.

== Career ==
After graduation, Wein opened the Storyville jazz club at Boston's Copley Square Hotel. While the club was an initial success, after only six weeks it was forced to close. It would later reopen at the Buckminster Hotel near Fenway Park. Over time, Wein also established the Storyville record label. He also taught a course at Boston University on the history of jazz.

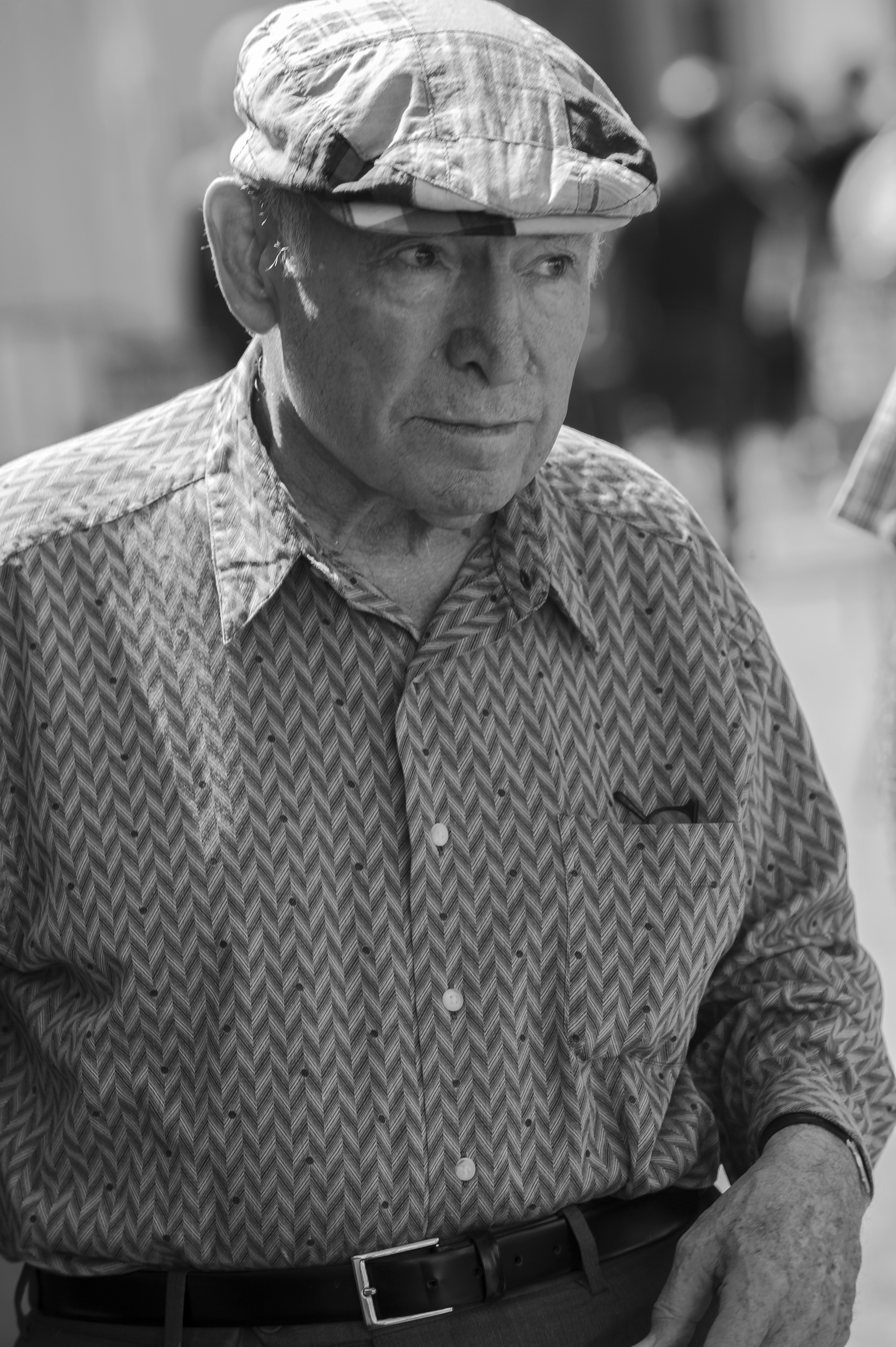
George Wein

In 1954, Louis and Elaine Lorillard invited Wein to organize a festival in their hometown of Newport, Rhode Island, with funding to be provided by them; the festival was the first outdoor jazz festival in the United States and became an annual tradition in Newport. Wein was subsequently instrumental in the founding of a number of festivals in other cities, including the New Orleans Jazz & Heritage Festival, and the Playboy Jazz Festival in Los Angeles, and established the Newport Folk Festival. In the 1960s he set up Festival Productions, a company dedicated to promoting large-scale jazz events.

Wein pioneered the idea of corporate sponsorship for his events. His Schlitz Salute to Jazz and Kool Jazz Festival were the first jazz events to put sponsors in the title: Schlitz beer and Kool cigarettes. Festival Productions organizes the JVC Jazz Festival at Newport and JVC Jazz Festivals in New York City, Los Angeles, Chicago, Paris, Warsaw, and Tokyo. Other title sponsors of Festival Productions events include Mellon Bank, Essence magazine, Verizon, Ben & Jerry's, and Dunkin' Donuts.

== Awards ==
Wein received a wide array of honors for his work with jazz concerts. He received the Patron of the Arts Award from the Studio Museum of Harlem in 1995, and was recognized with an Impact Award from the AARP in 2004. He was decorated with France's Légion d'honneur and appointed a Commandeur de L'Ordre des Arts et Lettres (Commander of the Order of Arts and Literature) by the French government. He has been honored at the White House by two American presidents, Jimmy Carter in 1978 and Bill Clinton in 1993. In 2005, he was named a "Jazz Master" by the National Endowment for the Arts. His autobiography, Myself Among Others: A Life in Music was singled out as 2004's best book about jazz by the Jazz Journalists Association. Wein received honorary degrees from the Berklee College of Music and Rhode Island College of Music, and was a lifetime Honorary Trustee of Carnegie Hall.

Wein was a distinguished member of the Board of Directors Advisory committee of the Jazz Foundation of America. He has also performed and presented at the Jazz Foundation's benefit concert "A Great Night in Harlem". He presented the Saint of Jazz award to Harry Elias of JVC America in 2002.

== Personal life ==
In 1959, Wein married Joyce Alexander (1928–2005), of African American descent. The couple established The George and Joyce Wein Collection of African-American Art.

Wein died at his home in Manhattan on September 13, 2021, at age 95.

== Discography ==
- George Wein (Atlantic, 1955)
- Wein, Women and Song (Arbors, 1955)
- Newport Jazz Festival All Stars (Atlantic, 1959 [1960]) with Buck Clayton, Bud Freeman, Vic Dickenson, Champ Jones, Jake Hanna and Pee Wee Russell
- Jazz at the Modern (1960)
- Midnight Concert in Paris (Smash, 1961)
- George Wein & the Newport All-Stars (Impulse!, 1962)
- George Wein Is Alive and Well in Mexico (1967)
- George Wein's Newport All-Stars (1969)
- Tribute to Duke (MPS, 1969)
- The Newport Jazz Festival All Stars (Concord, 1984)
- European Tour (Concord, 1987)
- Swing That Music (Columbia, 1993)
