= Bobby Hackett =

American jazz trumpeter and guitarist (1915–1976)

- Hackett at the Paramount Theatre in New York City, August 1946

Background information
- Born: January 31, 1915; Providence, Rhode Island, U.S.
- Died: June 7, 1976 (aged 61) Chatham, Massachusetts, U.S.
- Genres: Jazz; swing
- Occupation: Musician
- Instruments: Trumpet; cornet; guitar
- Years active: 1920s–1976
- Formerly of: Louis Armstrong; Glenn Miller Orchestra; Tony Bennett; Benny Goodman; Ray McKinley; Jackie Gleason; Jack Teagarden; Pee Wee Russell; Lee Wiley; Horace Heidt

Robert Leo Hackett (January 31, 1915 – June 7, 1976) was an American jazz musician who played swing music, Dixieland jazz and mood music, now called easy listening, on trumpet, cornet, and guitar. He played Swing with the bands of Glenn Miller and Benny Goodman in the late 1930s and early 1940s, he played Dixieland from the 1930s into the 1970s in a variety of groups with many of the major figures in the field, and he was a featured soloist on the first ten of the numerous Jackie Gleason mood music albums during the 1950s.

== Biography ==
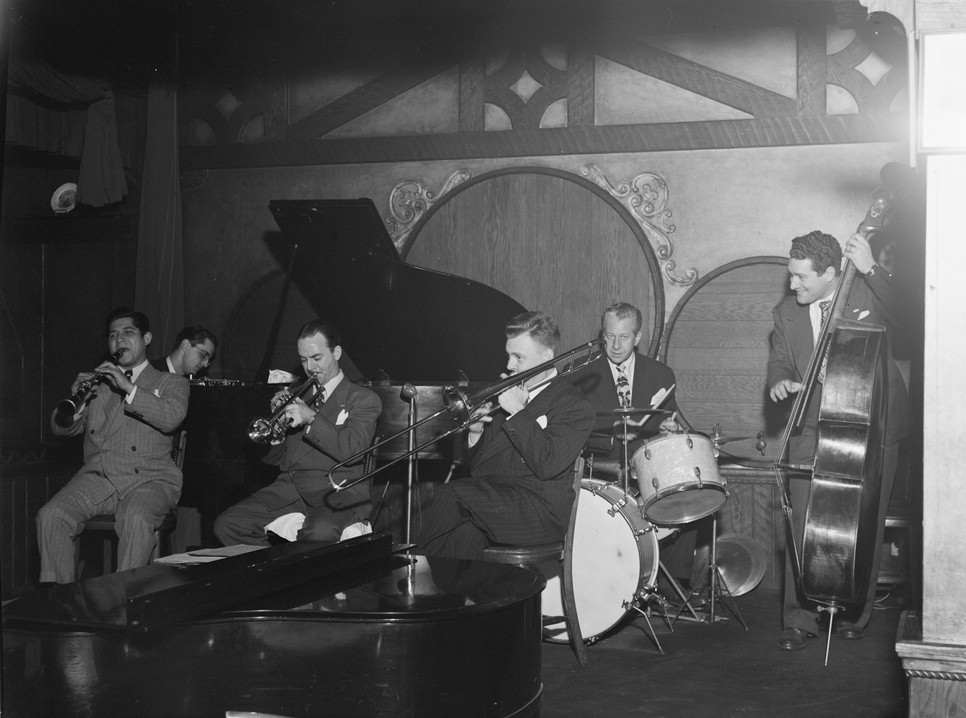
Ernie Caceres, Bobby Hackett, Freddie Ohms, and George Wettling, Nick's, New York City, 1940s Photography by William P. Gottlieb

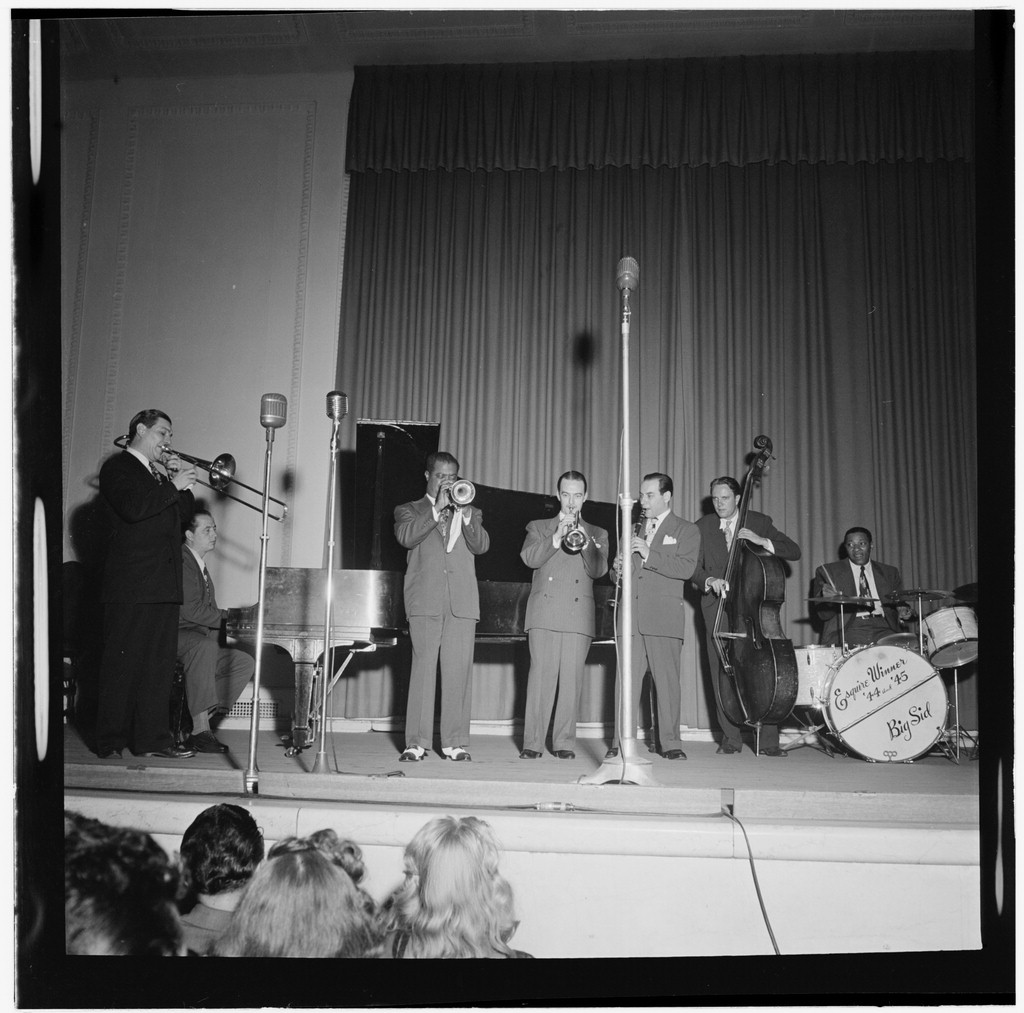
Hackett performing with Jack Teagarden, Dick Carey, Louis Armstrong, Peanuts Hucko, Bob Haggart, and Sid Catlett in New York City, ca. July 1947

Hackett was born in Providence, Rhode Island, United States. his father was a blacksmith, his mother a housewife. Because his family was poor, with nine children, he quit school at 14 to play guitar and violin in a band in a local Chinese restaurant. After he saw Louis Armstrong perform, he learned to play the cornet and trumpet. "I've never been the same since," he told long-time New Yorker jazz critic Whitney Balliett in 1969. "That man was and is the greatest hot-trumpet player in jazz." In Providence, he played in a couple of other local bands, then one in Syracuse, New York and another on Cape Cod, Massachusetts. He spent a couple of seasons in a band in Boston and Providence with Brad Gowans and clarinetist Pee Wee Russell, then led another band in Boston. After jazz critic George Frazier praised him in several articles, he moved to New York City in 1937. First he played with clarinetist Joe Marsala (later a songwriter) and then spent a year playing at Nick's, a Greenwich Village bar known for its Dixieland music. While there he became part of Dixieland musicians that included Pee Wee Russell, Brad Gowans, Zutty Singleton, Billy Butterfield, Dave Tough, Joe Sullivan, and Eddie Condon.

Although he always said he was a follower of Armstrong, he made his name as a follower of cornet player Bix Beiderbecke. In 1938 Benny Goodman hired the talented 23 year old to recreate Bix's "I'm Coming Virginia" solo at his (Goodman's) 1938 Carnegie Hall concert.

In the late 1930s, Hackett played lead trumpet in the Vic Schoen Orchestra, which backed the Andrews Sisters.

In the 1940 Fred Astaire movie, Second Chorus. Hackett can be heard on the soundtrack. He dubbed the trumpet playing of Fred Astaire in two numbers. In the movie, Astaire is a trumpet player in Artie Shaw's orchestra.

In 1939, the talent agency MCA asked Bobby Hackett to form a big band with its backing. When the band failed, he was in substantial debt to MCA. He joined the bands of Horace Heidt and then Glenn Miller in 1941 and 1942 to pay this debt. To make matters worse, his lip was in bad shape after dental surgery, making it difficult for him to play the trumpet or cornet. Glenn Miller offered him a job as a guitarist. "When I joined the band and I was making good money at last, [...] [jazz critics] accused me of selling out. Hell I wasn't selling out, I was selling in! It's funny, isn't it, how you go right into the wastebasket with some critics the minute you become successful."

Despite lip problems, Hackett could play occasional short solos, and he can be heard playing with the Glenn Miller Orchestra on the 1942 "A String of Pearls". Hackett referred to this solo as 'just a little exercise'. Balliett says the twelve-bar solo "remains in its design (scale), tone (moonlike), and lyricism (Bach) one of the recorded improvisational wonders."

In the mid-40s he was in Glen Gray's orchestra for two years. In 1946 he joined the music staff at ABC where he remained for 15 years. Feather points out this gave Hackett a steady income. He continued his live performances and recordings while there. He was playing regularly at Eddie Condon's and other clubs.

A dream come true for Hackett was his inclusion in Louis Armstrong's 1947 Town Hall Jazz Concert. He was music director for the concert and second cornet. Baillett says of the concert, "Hackett's background figures made Louis Armstrong sound like a nightingale."

In November 1947, he recorded two sides with Frank Sinatra. The first, on November 5, was "I've Got a Crush on You," arranged and conducted by George Siravo with a small group. Released the same year, it reached number 21 on the pop charts. On November 9, he recorded "Body and Soul" with Sinatra and a large orchestra arranged and conducted by Alex Stordahl. This recording was held back until June 1949, when it was one of the eight recordings on Sinatra's fourth Columbia album, Frankly Sentimental. Since then, two other takes have been released by Columbia.

Hackett took a leave of absence from ABC from 1951 to 1952 to organize a septet that played in several night clubs, including New York's The Embers. Five years later he organized another sextet that played at the Henry Hudson Hotel and several jazz festivals.

His profile increased after he was hired by Jackie Gleason as a cornet soloist for seven of Gleason's mood music albums. Beginning in 1952, he appeared on Gleason's first Capitol Records album, Music for Lovers Only. The record — as well as all of Gleason's next 10 albums — went gold. He appeared on six more of Gleason's albums. This association led directly to his signing with Capitol Records and performing trumpet and flugelhorn solos on several popular albums, including the best selling concept albums of Frank Sinatra. In 2001, when Mosaic Records released The Complete Capitol Bobby Hackett Solo Sessions on a five-CD limited edition set, most of the tracks were from Gleason's mood music albums. According to the liner notes, Hackett was paid $30,000 to $40,000 for six albums for Gleason.

In 1954, he appeared as a regular on the ABC variety show The Martha Wright Show, also known as The Packard Showroom.

In 1965, he toured with the singer Tony Bennett. In 1966 and 1967, he accompanied Bennett on two European tours. In the early 1970s, he performed separately with Dizzy Gillespie and Teresa Brewer.

In 2012, Hackett was selected to be inducted into the Rhode Island Music Hall of Fame.

== Personal life ==
Hackett married Edna Lillian Lee Hackett (d. 2000) in 1937. The Hacketts lived primarily in New York City and spent summers on Cape Cod, Massachusetts. They had a daughter, Barbara (d. 2003); and a son, Ernie (d. 2025), who became a professional drummer.

Hackett was a Freemason and was active with St. Cecile Lodge #568, a lodge specifically for musicians and artists.

Hackett died in 1976 of a heart attack at the age of 61.

== Discography ==
=== As leader ===
- 1930-40 - Chronological (Classics, ?)
- 1943-47 - Chronological (Classics, ?)
- 1948-54 - Chronological (Classics, ?)
- 1950.08 - Jazz Session (CBS, 1980)
- 1953-54 - Soft Lights and Bobby Hackett (Capitol, 1954)
- 1954? - In a Mellow Mood (Capitol, 1955)
- 1955.10 - Coast Concert (Capitol, 1956)
- 1957.03 - Gotham Jazz Scene (Capitol, 1957)
- 1956? - Rendezvous (Capitol, 1957)
- Bobby Hackett At The Embers (Capitol, 1958)
- Don't Take Your Love from Me (Capitol, 1958)
- Jazz Ultimate with Jack Teagarden (Capitol, 1958)
- The Bobby Hackett Quartet (Capitol, 1959)
- Blues with a Kick (Capitol, 1959)
- Hawaii Swings (Capitol, 1960)
- Dream Awhile (Columbia, 1960)
- The Most Beautiful Horn in the World (Columbia, 1962)
- Night Love (Columbia, 1962)
- Bobby Hackett Plays Henry Mancini (Epic, 1962)
- Plays the Music of Bert Kaempfert (Epic, 1964)
- Hello Louis!: Plays the Music of Louis Armstrong (Epic, 1964)
- Trumpets' Greatest Hits (Epic, 1965)
- A String of Pearls (Epic, 1965)
- Trumpet de Luxe with Billy Butterfield (CBS [Japan], 1966)
- 1967.01 - Creole Cookin (Verve, 1967)
- 1967 - That Midnight Touch (Project 3, 1967)
- 1967 - A Time for Love (Project 3, 1967)
- 1967.08 - Bobby/Billy/Brazil (Verve, 1968)
- 1968.11 - This Is My Bag (Project 3, 1969)
- 1969.04-05 - Live at the Roosevelt Grill Voll. 1-4 (Chiaroscuro, 1970) Vol. 1 reissued as Featuring Vic Dickenson at the Roosevelt Grill (Chiaroscuro, 1977)
- 1970? - The Bobby Hackett Four with Dave McKenna (Hyannisport, 1972)
- 1972? - Bobby Hackett and Vic Dickenson at the Royal Box (Hyannisport, 1972)
- 1973 - What a Wonderful World (Flying Dutchman, 1973)
- 1974.08 - Strike Up the Band (Flying Dutchman, 1975)
- 1973.05 - Live in New Orleans (Riff, 1976) With Ted Easton's Jazzband
- 1975 - Butterfly Airs Vol. 1 (Honey Dew, 1977)
- 1975 - Butterfly Airs Vol. 2 (Honey Dew, 1977)
- 1976 - Tin Roof Blues (Honey Dew, 1977)

=== As sideman ===
With Jackie Gleason

- Music for Lovers Only (Capitol, 1952)
- Music to Make You Misty (Capitol, 1953)
- Music, Martinis, and Memories (Capitol, 1954)
- Jackie Gleason Presents Autumn Leaves (Capitol, 1955)
- Music to Remember Her (Capitol, 1955)
- Music to Change Her Mind (Capitol, 1956)
- Jackie Gleason Presents Music for the Love Hours (Capitol, 1957)
- Jackie Gleason Presents Lush Musical Interludes for That Moment (Capitol, 1959)
- The Most Beautiful Girl in the World (Pickwick/33, 1967)

With others ( Frankie Laine 1955 'Te Amo')

- Louis Armstrong, Town Hall (RCA Victor, 1957)
- Tony Bennett, The Very Thought of You (Columbia, 1965)
- Tony Bennett, A Time for Love (Columbia, 1966)
- Teresa Brewer, Good News (Signature, 1974)
- Ruth Brown, Ruth Brown (Atlantic, 1957)
- Jim Cullum Jr., Goose Pimples (Audiophile, 1967)
- Eddie Condon, Bixieland (credited as Pete Pesci, Columbia, 1955)
- Eddie Condon, Midnight in Moscow (Epic, 1962)
- Eddie Condon, Eddie Condon On Stage (Saga, 1973)
- Dizzy Gillespie, Giants (Perception, 1971)
- Benny Goodman, The Famous 1938 Carnegie Hall Jazz Concert (Columbia, 1950)
- Bill Kenny, I Don't Stand a Ghost of a Chance with You (Decca, 1951)
- Glenn Miller, A String of Pearls (Bluebird, 1941)
- Glenn Miller, Rhapsody in Blue (Victor, 1942)
- Frank Sinatra, I've Got a Crush on You (Columbia, 1947)
- Frank Sinatra, Body and Soul (Columbia, 1947)
- Jack Teagarden, Jack Teagarden!!! (Verve, 1962)
- Lee Wiley, Night in Manhattan (Columbia, 1955)
