= Pee Wee Russell =

American jazz clarinetist (1906–1969)

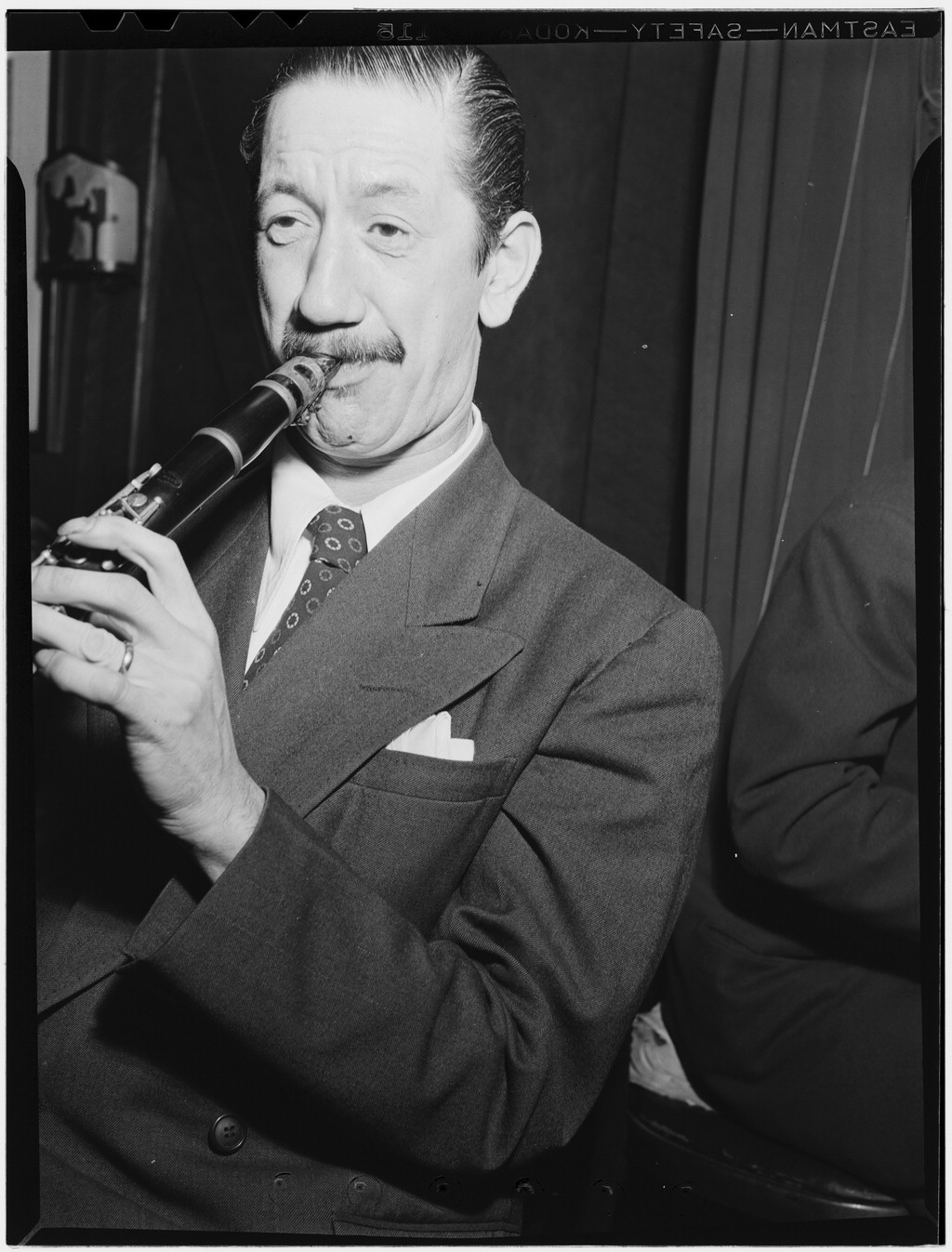
- Russell in New York, 1946

Background information
- Born: Charles Ellsworth Russell; March 27, 1906; Maplewood, Missouri, U.S.
- Origin: Muskogee, Oklahoma, U.S.
- Died: February 15, 1969 (aged 62) Alexandria, Virginia, U.S.
- Genres: Jazz; bebop; Dixieland; swing; post-bop; free jazz
- Occupations: Musician; composer
- Instruments: Clarinet; saxophone
- Years active: 1920s–1960s

Charles Ellsworth "Pee Wee" Russell (March 27, 1906 – February 15, 1969) was an American jazz musician. Early in his career he played clarinet and saxophones, but he eventually focused solely on clarinet.

With a highly individualistic and spontaneous clarinet style that "defied classification", Russell began his career playing traditional jazz, but throughout his career incorporated elements of newer developments such as swing, bebop, and free jazz. Writing in 1961, the poet Philip Larkin commented, "No one familiar with the characteristic excitement of his solos, their lurid, snuffling, asthmatic voicelessness, notes leant on till they split, and sudden passionate intensities, could deny the uniqueness of his contribution to jazz."

== Early life ==
Pee Wee Russell was born in Maplewood, Missouri, United States, and grew up in Muskogee, Oklahoma. As a child, he first studied violin, but "couldn't get along with it", then piano, disliking the scales and chord exercises, and then drums – including all the associated special effects. Then his father sneaked young Ellsworth into a dance at the local Elks Club to a four- or five-piece band led by New Orleans jazz clarinetist Alcide "Yellow" Nunez. Russell was amazed by Nunez's improvisations: "[He] played the melody, then got hot and played jazz. That was something. How did he know where he was or where he was going?" Pee Wee now decided that his primary instrument would be the clarinet, and the type of music he would play would be jazz. He approached the clarinetist in the pit band at the local theatre for lessons and bought an Albert system instrument. His teacher was Charlie Merrill, who used to pop out for shots of corn whiskey during lessons.

His family moved to St. Louis, Missouri, in 1920, and that September, Russell was enrolled in the Western Military Academy in Alton, Illinois. He remained enrolled there until October the following year, though he spent most of his time playing clarinet with various dance and jazz bands. He began touring professionally in 1922 and travelled widely with the Allen Brothers tent show and on riverboats St. Paul and J.S. He also played with a Charles Creath band at the Booker T. Washington Theatre, a cultural epicenter for African Americans at the time. Russell's recording debut was in 1924 with Herb Berger's Band in St. Louis on "Fuzzy Wuzzy Bird".

It was bandleader Herbert Berger, whose hotel band Russell had joined after leaving Western Military Academy, who gave him the nickname "Pee Wee".

== Career ==
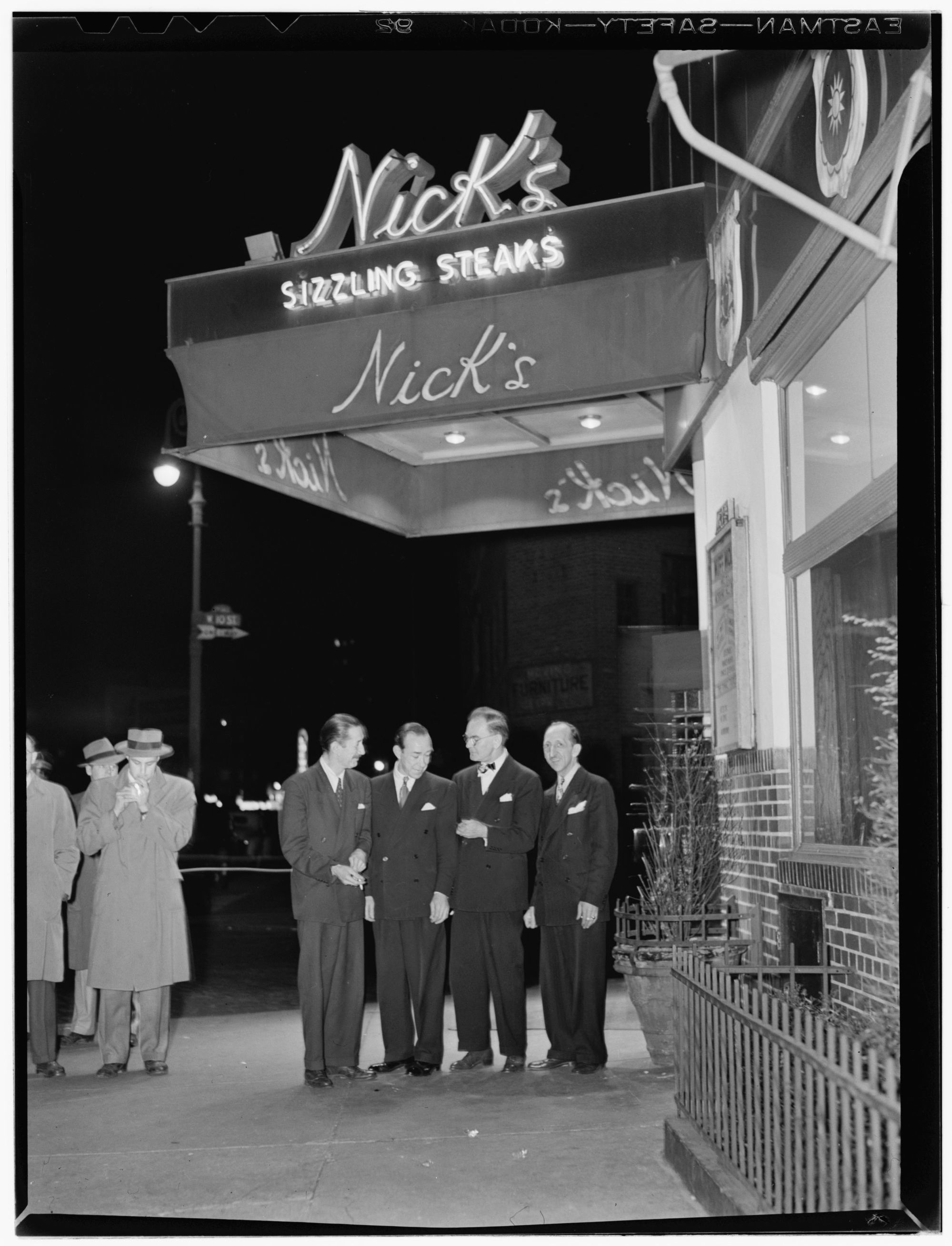
From left: Pee Wee Russell, Muggsy Spanier, Miff Mole, and Joe Grauso, at Nick's (Tavern), New York, c. June 1946

From his earliest career, Russell's style was distinctive. The notes he played were somewhat unorthodox when compared to his contemporaries, and he was sometimes accused of playing out of tune. By the mid-1920s, Russell was a sought-after jazz clarinetist and worked with Jack Teagarden in pianist Peck Kelly's band in Texas. Back in St. Louis, Russell played with Frankie Trumbauer and Bix Beiderbecke at the Arcadia Ballroom, which had hired Trumbauer as bandleader for the season spanning September 1925 and May 1926. For a short while, Jack Teagarden also played at the Arcadia, and Russell claimed that this was the greatest band he had ever played in. In 1926, he joined Jean Goldkette's band, and the following year, he left for New York City to join Red Nichols. While with Nichols's band, Russell did frequent freelance recording studio work, on clarinet; soprano, alto, and tenor saxophones; and bass clarinet. In 1932, he recorded with the Rhythmakers in New York City. He worked with various bandleaders (including Louis Prima) before beginning a series of residences at the jazz club Nick's in Greenwich Village, Manhattan, in 1937. He played with Bobby Hackett's big band, and began playing with Eddie Condon, with whom he would continue to work, off and on, for much of the rest of his life – though he complained, "Those guys [at Nick's and Condon's] made a joke, of me, a clown, and I let myself be treated that way because I was afraid. I didn't know where else to go, where to take refuge".

During World War II, he recorded V-Disc sides with Muggsy Spanier and the V-Disc All Stars. His composition "Pee Wee Speaks" with Spanier was released as a V-Disc, as Navy V-Disc 135 and as Army V-Disc 344 in January, 1945.

From the 1940s onwards, Russell's health was often poor, exacerbated by alcoholism – "I lived on brandy milkshakes and scrambled-egg sandwiches. And on whiskey ... I had to drink half a pint of whiskey in the morning before I could get out of bed" – which led to a major medical breakdown in 1951. He had periods when he could not play. Some people considered that his style was different after his breakdown: Philip Larkin characterized it as "a hollow feathery tone framing phrases of an almost Chinese introspection with a tendency to inconclusive garrulity that would have been unheard of in the days when Pee Wee could pack more into a middle eight than any other thirties pick-up player".

He played with Art Hodes, Muggsy Spanier, and occasionally bands under his own name in addition to Condon. In his last decade, Russell often played at jazz festivals and international tours organized by George Wein, including an appearance with Thelonious Monk with an extended solo on Blue Monk at the 1963 Newport Jazz Festival, a meeting which has a mixed reputation (first available on the LP Miles & Monk at Newport, and currently available as part of the Monk 2-CD set At Newport 1963–65). Russell formed a quartet with valve trombone player Marshall Brown, and included John Coltrane and Ornette Coleman tunes in his repertoire. Though often labeled a Dixieland musician by virtue of the company he kept, he tended to reject any label. Russell's unique and sometimes derided approach was praised as ahead of its time and cited by some as an early example of free jazz. At the time of their 1961 recording Jazz Reunion (Candid), Coleman Hawkins (who had originally recorded with Russell in 1929 and considered him to be color-blind) observed that "For thirty years, I've been listening to him play those funny notes. He used to think they were wrong, but they weren't. He's always been way out, but they didn't have a name for it then." George Wein's George Wein & the Newport All-Stars album includes a slow blues by Russell called "The Bend's Blues".

His last gig was with Wein at the inaugural ball for President Richard Nixon on January 21, 1969. Russell died in a hospital in Alexandria, Virginia, less than three weeks later.

== Personal life ==
Russell married Mary Chaloff, the daughter of a Russian-Jewish family from Odessa who had settled on the Lower East Side of Manhattan, at New York's City Hall, with drummer Danny Alvin standing up for the couple. They met at Nick's, where Mary was working as a hat-check girl.

Around 1948, amid worsening alcoholism and an undiagnosed illness, Russell left Mary and moved first to Chicago and then to San Francisco, where he collapsed and was hospitalized. Doctors there diagnosed pancreatitis and multiple cysts on his liver. After his release he was briefly estranged from Mary, who eventually located him, and the two reconciled and remained married until her death.

Encouraged by Mary, Russell took up painting abstract art as a hobby in his later years. Mary's death in the spring of 1967 had a severe effect on him.

== Awards and honors ==
- 1987: Inductee in the Big Band and Jazz Hall of Fame

== Compositions ==
Pee Wee Russell wrote or co-wrote the following songs: "Pee Wee's Blues", "Pee Wee Speaks", "Oh! No", "Muskeegie Blues", "Three-Two-One Blues", "Stuyvesant Blues", "Pee Wee's Song", "The Bends Blues", "Midnight Blue", "Englewood", "Cutie Pie", "What's the Pitch", "Missy", "This Is It", "Pee Wee's Tune", and "But Why".

== Discography ==
=== As leader/co-leader ===
- 1938: Pee Wee Russell and His Rhythmakers (Atlantic, 1952) Original H.R.S recordings
- 1938–45: Jazz Original (Commodore, 1997) Riunite the Commodore recordings under Pee Wee Russel and Eddie Condon names Also issued as A Legend (Fontana-Mainstream, 1965)
- 1945.11: At The Copley Terrace (Jazzology, 1996) with Max Kaminsky
- 1952: Two of Us and Jazz (Rondo-lette, 1958) live at Storyville reissued, with inedits, as Clarinet Strut (Drive Archive, 1994)
- 1955: Jazz at Storyville, Vol. 1 and 2 (Savoy, 1952) 10" - Reissued as The Individualism of Pee Wee Russell (Savoy Jazz, 1978, 1995) with Ruby Braff
- 1953–54: We're In the Money (Storyville, 1956) reissued by (Black Lion, 1988) same title
- 1957: New Orleans Dixieland (Master High Fidelity) reissued as Dixieland U.S.A.(Coronet Records, 1959)
- 1958.02: Portrait of Pee Wee (Counterpoint, 1958) 3 track in Over the Rainbow (Xanadu, 1982)
- 1958: Pee Wee Plays Pee Wee (Bell Recs., 1961) entire 1958 session on Over the Rainbow (Xanadu, 1982)
- 1959.02: Pee Wee Russell Plays (Dot, ?) reissued as Salute to Newport (Impulse!, 1978)
- 1959: Newport Jazz Festival All Stars (Atlantic, 1960) with Buck Clayton, Bud Freeman, Vic Dickenson...
- 1960: The Greatest Dixieland Bands (Hudson, ?) (With Pee Wee Hunt, only side 1 of the album)
- 1960: Swingin' with Pee Wee (Swingville) with Buck Clayton; reissued in CD as The Pee Wee Russell Memorial Album (Prestige, 1999)
- 1961.02: Jazz Reunion (Candid) with Coleman Hawkins
- 1962.12: New Groove (Columbia, 1963)
- 1963.04: Ask Me Now! (Impulse!, 1966)
- 1964.02: Hot Licorice (Honey Dew, 1977) live at Bovi's Tavern
- 1964.02: Gumbo (Honey Dew, 1977) live at Bovi's Tavern
- 1966.10: The College Concert (Impulse!) with Henry Red Allen
- 1967.02: The Spirit of '67 with Oliver Nelson (Impulse!) – Oliver Nelson as arranger

=== As sideman ===
With Bix Beiderbecke

- Bix Beiderbecke, Vol. 2: At The Jazz Band Ball 1927–1928 (Columbia, 1990)

With Ruby Braff

- Hi-Fi Salute to Bunny (RCA Victor, 1957)
- The Ruby Braff Octet with Pee Wee Russell & Bobby Henderson at Newport (Verve, 1957)

With Boyce Brown (aka "Brother Brown")

- Brother Matthew With Eddie Condon's Jazz Band (ABC-Paramount, 1956) lead credits as "Brother Mathew and Eddie Condon's Jazz Band"

With Eddie Condon

- Eddie Condon on Stage (1949 live recording, on side 1 of album released by Saga, 1973)
- Eddie Condon's Treasury of Jazz (Columbia, 1956)
- That Toodlin' Town (Warner Bros., 1959)

With Jimmy McPartland and Wild Bill Davison

- Dixieland At Carnegie Hall (25 Top Stars) (Roulette, 1958)

With Thelonious Monk

- Miles & Monk at Newport (Columbia, 1963)

With Al Sears

- Things Ain't What They Used to Be (Swingville, 1961) as part of the Prestige Swing Festival

With George Wein

- George Wein & the Newport All-Stars (Impulse!, 1962)

With Various

- Take Me to the Land of Jazz (Living Era ASV CD, 2001) 24 recordings 1927–1946
