= Ruby Braff =

American jazz trumpeter and cornetist

- Birth name: Reuben Braff
- Born: March 16, 1927
- Origin: Boston, Massachusetts, U.S.
- Died: February 9, 2003 (aged 75); Chatham, Massachusetts, U.S.
- Genres: Swing; Dixieland; Mainstream jazz
- Instrument(s): Cornet; Trumpet
- Labels: Arbors
- Formerly of: Edmond Hall

Reuben "Ruby" Braff (March 16, 1927 – February 9, 2003) was an American jazz trumpeter and cornetist. Jack Teagarden was once asked about him on the Garry Moore television show and described Ruby as "the Ivy League Louis Armstrong".

Braff, who was of Jewish heritage, was born in Boston, Massachusetts, United States. He was renowned for working in an idiom ultimately derived from the playing of Louis Armstrong and Bix Beiderbecke. He began playing in local clubs in the 1940s. In 1949, he was hired to play with the Edmond Hall Orchestra at the Savoy Cafe of Boston. He relocated to New York in 1953 where he was much in demand for band dates and recordings.

He resided in Harwich, Massachusetts and died of complications from emphysema, heart failure, and glaucoma on February 9, 2003, in Chatham, Massachusetts. He had spent a good part of his life living in the Riverdale section of The Bronx, New York City.

== Discography ==
=== As leader/co-leader ===
- Buck Meets Ruby (Vanguard, 1954) with Buck Clayton
- Jazz at Storyville, Vol. 1 and 2 (Savoy, 1955) with Pee Wee Russell
- Ruby Braff Swings (Bethlehem, 1955)
- Holiday in Braff (Bethlehem, 1955)
- Ball at Bethlehem with Braff (Bethlehem, 1955)
- Braff!! (Epic, 1956)
- Ruby Braff featuring Dave McKenna (ABC-Paramount, 1956)
- Hi-Fi Salute to Bunny (RCA Victor, 1957)
- The Ruby Braff Octet with Pee Wee Russell & Bobby Henderson at Newport (Verve, 1957)
- Ruby Braff Goes 'Girl Crazy' (Warner Bros. Records, 1958)
- Easy Now (RCA, 1959)
- You're Getting To Be A Habit With Me (Stere-O-Craft, 1959)
- Blowing Around The World (United Artists, 1959)
- The Ruby Braff Marshall Brown Sextet (United Artists, 1961)
- Very Sinatra (Finesse, 1982)
- Live at the Regattabar (Arbors, 1993)
- Ruby Braff Remembers Louis Armstrong: Being with You (Arbors, 1997)
- You Can Depend on Me (Arbors, 1998)
- Born to Play (Arbors, 1999)
- Ruby Braff and Strings: In the Wee, Small Hours in London and New York (Arbors, 2000)
- The Cape Godfather (Arbors, 2000)
- Music for the Still of the Night (Arbors, 2001)
- I Hear Music (Arbors, 2002)
- Relaxing at the Penthouse with the John Pizzarelli Trio (Victoria, 2002)
- Variety Is the Spice of Braff (Arbors, 2002)
- Watch What Happens (Arbors, 2003)
- You Brought a New Kind of Love (Arbors, 2005)
- Controlled Nonchalance' at the Regattabar, Vol. 2 (Arbors, 2006)
- Ruby Braff And The Flying Pizzarellis: C'est Magnifique! (Arbors, 2007)
- Little Things - Live In Dublin 1976 (Nagel-Heyer Records, 2007)
- For the Last Time - Ruby Braff's Historic Final Performance With Scott Hamilton (Arbors, 2008)
- Our Love is Here to Stay (Arbors, 2010)

=== With George Barnes ===
- The Ruby Braff-George Barnes Quartet (Chiaroscuro, 1974)
- The Ruby Braff-George Barnes Quartet Salutes Rodgers and Hart (Concord Jazz, 1974)
- The Ruby Braff-George Barnes Quartet – Live at the New School (Chiaroscuro, 1974)
- The Ruby Braff-George Barnes Quartet Plays Gershwin (Concord Jazz, 1974)
- The Ruby Braff-George Barnes Quartet – To Fred Astaire with Love (RCA, 1975)

=== With Ellis Larkins ===
- 2 Part Inventions in Jazz, Vol. 2, (Vanguard, 1955)
- The Grand Reunion (Chiaroscuro, 1972)
- Ruby Braff & Ellis Larkins: The Complete Duets (Definitive Classics, 2006)
- Ruby Braff and Ellis Larkins: Calling Berlin, Vols. 1 & 2 (Arbors)

=== As sideman ===
With Larry Adler

- Larry Adler Again! (Audio Fidelity, 1959)

With Louis Armstrong

- Louis Armstrong and His Friends (Flying Dutchman/Amsterdam, 1970)

With Tony Bennett

- Tony Bennett Sings 10 Rodgers & Hart Songs (Improv, 1976)
- Tony Bennett Sings More Great Rodgers & Hart (Improv, 1977)
- Tony Bennett Sings the Rodgers & Hart Songbook (Concord, 2005; reissue of Improv recordings, plus unreleased takes)

With Buck Clayton

- Jumpin' at the Woodside (Columbia, 1955)
- All the Cats Join In (Columbia 1956)

With Scott Hamilton and Dave McKenna

- Controlled Nonchalance at the Regattabar, Volume 1 (Arbors)
- Controlled Nonchalance, Volume 2 (Arbors)

With Woody Herman

- It Had To Be Us (Chiaroscuro 1998)

With Milt Hinton

- The Judge at His Best (Chiaroscuro, 2001)

With Dick Hyman

- America, The Beautiful (Arbors)
- Ruby Braff and Dick Hyman Play Nice Tunes (Arbors)
- Manhattan Jazz (MusicMasters)
- Music from My Fair Lady (Concord)
- Music from South Pacific (Concord)

With Pee Wee Russell

- The Individualism of Pee Wee Russell (1952)
- A Portrait of Pee Wee (1958)

With Ralph Sutton

- R & R (Chiaroscuro, 2002)
- Remembered (Arbors DVD)

With George Wein

- Wein, Women and Song and More, George Wein Plays and Sings (Arbors)
- George Wein & the Newport All-Stars (Impulse!, 1962)
- George Wein's Newport All-Stars (Atlantic, 1969)

== See also ==
- Izzy Ort's Bar & Grille
