= Stardust (1927 song) =

1927 song by Hoagy Carmichael

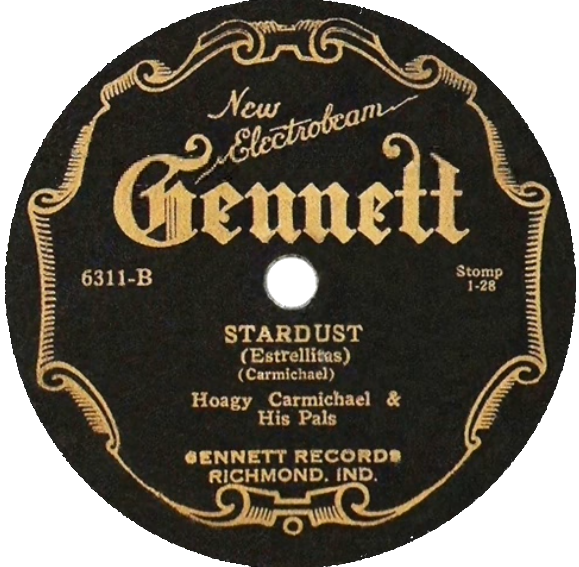

Song by Hoagy Carmichael and His Pals
- Written: 1927
- Published: January 19, 1929 by Mills Music, Inc.
- Released: October 1928
- Recorded: October 31, 1927
- Studio: Gennett Studios, Richmond, Indiana
- Genre: Jazz
- Length: 3:02
- Label: Gennett
- Composer: Hoagy Carmichael
- Lyricist: Mitchell Parish

Hoagy Carmichael and His Pals singles chronology
"Stardust" (1928)	""Barnacle Bill The Sailor"" (1936)

"Stardust" is a 1927 song composed by Hoagy Carmichael, with lyrics later added by Mitchell Parish. It has been recorded as an instrumental or vocal track over 1,500 times. Carmichael developed a taste for jazz while attending Indiana University. He formed his own band and played at local events in Indiana and Ohio. Following his graduation, Carmichael moved to Florida to work for a law firm. He left the law sector and returned to Indiana, after learning of the success of one of his compositions. In 1927, after leaving a local university hangout, Carmichael started to whistle a tune that he later developed further. When composing the song, he was inspired by the end of one of his love affairs, and on the suggestion of a university classmate, he decided on its title. The same year, Carmichael recorded an instrumental version of the song for Gennett Records.

In 1928, Carmichael left Indiana after Mills Music hired him as a composer. Mills Music then assigned Mitchell Parish to add words to the song. Don Redman recorded the song in the same year, and by 1929 it was performed regularly at the Cotton Club. Isham Jones's 1930 rendition of the song made it popular on radio, and soon multiple acts had recorded "Stardust". Because of the song's popularity, by 1936, RCA Victor pressed a double-sided version that featured Tommy Dorsey and Benny Goodman on respective sides.

By 1940 the song was considered a standard, and it was later included in the Great American Songbook. That year, RCA Victor released two more recordings of "Stardust": one by Dorsey featuring Frank Sinatra as the singer, and one by Artie Shaw. Shaw's recording sold one million copies, and Glenn Miller's rendition was published in the same year. Artists including Jo Stafford, Ella Fitzgerald, Nat King Cole, Billy Ward and his Dominoes, Ringo Starr, and Willie Nelson have recorded "Stardust". The song was featured in several films, including The Man Who Fell to Earth, My Favorite Year, Goodfellas, Sleepless in Seattle, and Casino. It was inducted into the Grammy Hall of Fame in 1995 and added to the National Recording Registry in 2004.

== Background ==
Soon after entering Indiana University, Carmichael developed a taste for jazz music. He had learned to play the piano with his mother, who performed at dances and movie theaters. In 1922, Carmichael met and befriended Bix Beiderbecke. Carmichael often played with Beiderbecke, and he became acquainted with his band, the Wolverines, who recorded his original composition "Riverboat Shuffle" in 1924. While still attending Indiana University, the singer formed a band called Carmichael's Collegians. Carmichael and his band performed locally in Indiana and around Ohio. The band appeared at 50 events between 1924 and 1925, while between 1925 and 1926, they played three to five nights a week at different engagements. Carmichael received his bachelor's degree in 1925 and had earned a Bachelor of Laws by 1926. In the same year he worked as a law clerk in Miami, but he returned to Indiana after failing the Florida Bar examination. However, he passed the Indiana State Bar Association examination and worked for a law firm in that state. With the success of Red Nichols' 1927 recording of Carmichael's original "Washboard Blues", the composer decided to leave the practice of law in pursuit of a career in music.

== Composition, first recording and addition of lyrics ==
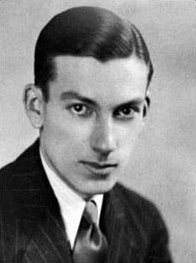
Carmichael pictured while attending Indiana University, where he composed the tune.

Carmichael wrote the song with inspiration from the end of his love affair with Kathryn Moore, who would later marry Art Baker, the trumpet player in Carmichael's Collegians. While Carmichael related several explanations of how he was inspired to write it on the University campus, biographer Richard Sudhalter deemed the stories "encrusted in myth, much of it the composer's own creation". One night after leaving the Book Nook, a university hangout, Carmichael whistled what would become the opening of the song. The composer later declared that he felt that the tune "had something very strange and different". He worked on the details with different pianos, including one at the Book Nook. According to Ernie Pyle, the composer did further work at the Carmichael family's home. While he visited Carmichael, Pyle asked him to play the song he had been working on.

Pyle later commented that Carmichael asked him not to reveal the details of the night he worked on the song with the family's piano, saying "the public likes to think these sweet songs are conceived under the moonlight, amid roses and soft breezes". Carmichael finished the details of the composition on a grand piano that was later thrown away because of its poor state. Baker and Carmichael's Collegians' singer Violet Deckard Gardner remembered Carmichael humming the tune of the incomplete composition before 1926. Fellow student Stuart Gorrell suggested the title "Star Dust"; Gorrell felt the tune sounded like "dust from stars drifting down through the summer sky".

=== Recording ===
After working out the details with the band, Carmichael booked a recording session with Gennett Records for October 31, 1927. Since he had not written any sheet music for the song, he had to whistle the tune to the musicians. Carmichael played the piano, backed by Emil Seidel and his orchestra: Byron Smart (trumpet), Oscar Rossberg (trombone), Dick Kent and Gene Wood (alto saxophones), Maurice Bennett (tenor saxophone), Don Kimmel (guitar), Paul Brown (tuba), Cliff Williams (drums). The session took place at Gennett's studio in Richmond, Indiana. The recording featured a "medium fast and jazzy tempo" with no lyrics. Under the single-word title "Stardust," it was placed on the flipside of "One Night In Havana", assigned the release number 6311, and credited to Hoagy Carmichael and His Pals.

Carmichael received a one-sided pressing of "Stardust" from the studio, before he left Indiana in 1928 to work for Mills Music as a composer. The first manuscript for the song was deposited at the United States Copyright Office on January 5, 1928. The sheet music featured a tune in a key of D with no indication of tempo and no lyrics. Mills Music then published different sheet music for the song on January 19, 1929, as a piano composition. Don Redman, who worked for Mills Music, often played the song. After hearing Redman's rendition of it, a company arranger suggested playing the song at a "slower tempo and in a sentimental style". Feeling it could be a potential success, Irving Mills "decided on the song having lyrics added.

=== Lyrics ===
Mills assigned lyricist Mitchell Parish to add the words to Carmichael's "Star Dust". Parish used as a working title "Then I Will Be Satisfied", but he accepted Redman's suggestion to re-title the song to "Stardust". Author Gene Fernett suggested Redman wrote the verse of the song, but his claim could not be supported. (The verse music is present on the original 1927 Gennett recording.) Parish wrote the song using Carmichael's account of how he was inspired to compose the melody, while the lyricist developed a story focused in the concept of lost love. The sheet music for the vocal composition was published as "Star Dust" on May 10, 1929 in the key of C major.

=== Analysis ===
The song's structure has two introductory verses that are sometimes omitted. These are followed by a 32-bar chorus in ABAC form (instead of the traditional AABA form) that is often repeated. The intriguing opening harmonic progression of the chorus starts on the IV chord for two bars which then changes from major to minor, a method also used by two contemporary songs: "After You’ve Gone" (1918) and "I’ll See You In My Dreams" (1924).

The melody fluctuates between minor and major third intervals in range of an octave and a third to "heighten drama".

== Early recordings ==
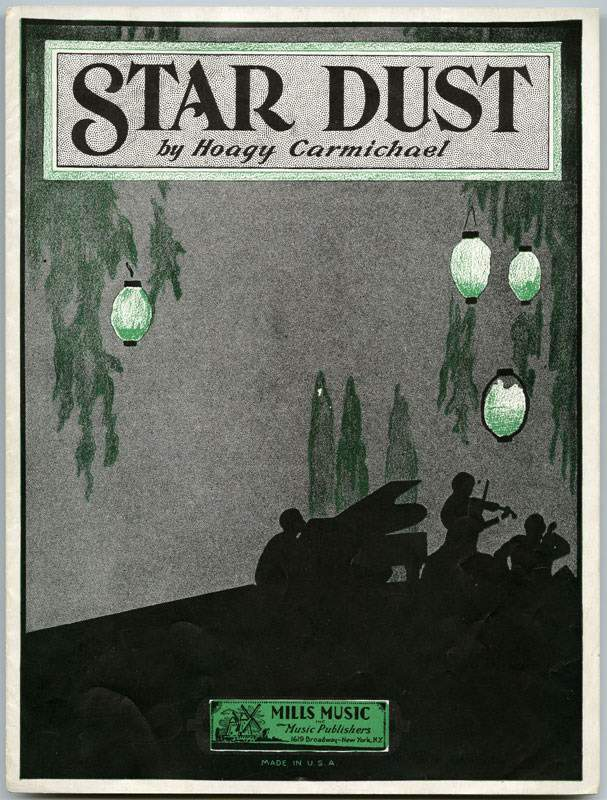
Sheet music cover, 1929

In early 1929, Redman and his band The Chocolate Dandies released "Star Dust" on Okeh 8668. The recording retained Carmichael's original key of D. The song soon circulated among black musicians and jazz interpreters, and it was often performed at the Cotton Club after being introduced in 1929. Duke Ellington performed the song at the club. The revue Hot Chocolates featured a version by Louis Armstrong, which was inducted into the Grammy Hall of Fame in 2009.

While Carmichael worked for RCA Records as a session jazz ensemble leader, journalist Walter Winchell promoted the song. His writings attracted the attention of Isham Jones, who recorded a version with his orchestra as a slow ballad. Jones's session took place on May 14, 1930, in Chicago, and Brunswick Records released it under catalog number 4856, with the title once again "Stardust." The 1931 release became one of his most popular recordings. By 1931, "Stardust" was often played by the orchestras of several US radio stations. While remarking on the popularity of the tune on the radio, the Calgary Herald opined of Jones's version: "This beautiful melody seems destined to achieve the popularity which it so richly deserves and which is so long overdue." In August 1931, Bing Crosby released the song as "Star Dust" on Brunswick Records. The same year, Lee Sims also released "Stardust" on Brunswick 6132, a version that the Sydney Morning Herald called "a melody of a considerable intensity and with dramatic outbursts," with a "realistic and very full" piano reproduction. Throughout the 1930s, record labels used both the one and two-word versions of the title, though Carmichael himself favored the one-word title, as evidenced by his private correspondence and his 1946 memoir The Stardust Road.

== Big band era and success ==
By 1935, while radio announcers commonly credited the orchestra only, Carmichael was mentioned as the composer of the song during introductions because of its popularity. The same year, saxophonist Coleman Hawkins recorded the song on March 2 in Paris. Compagnie de Gramophone Française released it with the catalog number K-7527. The song was often performed by Art Tatum, Garnet Clark, and Fats Waller. Mills recorded the song himself with his multiple bands, and recorded versions by the Mills Blue Rhythm Band and Cab Calloway. In 1936, for the first time in its history, RCA Records pressed two versions of the same song by two different artists on a single record: Tommy Dorsey on one side and Benny Goodman on the other. Goodman used an arrangement by Fletcher Henderson, while Dorsey's version featured the vocals of Edythe Wright. By 1937, Goodman remarked that Carmichael's tune was the most popular dance number of his repertoire. "Stardust" became a standard of big band music.

In 1940, RCA Victor executive Harry Myerson proposed that the label again release a two-sided recording of "Stardust": one side would feature Artie Shaw, the other a new version by Dorsey. Shaw and Dorsey's versions were ultimately released on separate records. Dorsey's recording of the song featured vocals by Frank Sinatra and the Pied Pipers, while Shaw's release would become the most popular recording by the clarinetist, selling a million copies. The Baltimore Sun celebrated the release of both recordings in the same week. It considered Dorsey's version "emotional", and felt the vocals by Sinatra and the Pied Pipers made the record suitable for "armchair listening". Of Shaw's version, the reviewer remarked on his "fluid clarinet above strings", and determined the record is for "straight dancing". The Tampa Bay Times welcomed Dorsey's "silky trombone" and the "slow vocal style" of Sinatra and the Pied Pipers. Of Shaw's version, they stressed his "intricate and dazzling clarinet wizardry", and the "medium slow drag" playing style of the band. The Times-Dispatch also remarked on the "intricate clarinet work" by Shaw, while it felt that Dorsey's version featured "expert trombone work" and an "unusual vocal" that the reviewer preferred over Shaw's version. Shaw's recording was arranged by Lennie Hayton, while the clarinetist used his new orchestra composed of: Billy Butterfield (trumpet), Jerry Jerome (tenor saxophone), Johnny Guarnieri (piano), Nick Fatool (drums), and Jack Jenney and Vernon Brown (trombones). Hayton's arrangements included solos by Shaw, Butterfield and Jenney, while they were focused on the use of the string section.

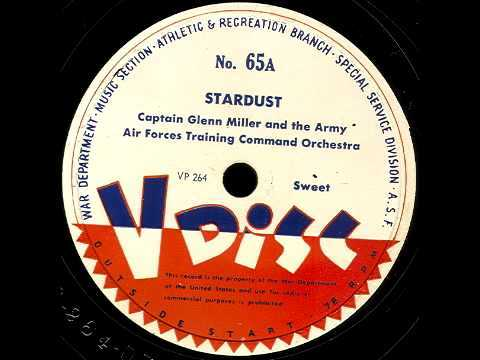
Glenn Miller and the AAFTC Orchestra recording issued as V-Disc in 1943

Also in 1940, Glenn Miller recorded his version of the song, which entered Billboard's National Best Selling Chart on October 26, and peaked at number 20. DownBeat's review considered the release "among the greatest bits of big band scoring in history". While it considered the song "beautifully arranged with good sax and trumpet solos", The Boston Globe felt the result is "completely dead and lifeless". The publication attributed this to an imbalance in the number of musicians in the woodwind section, compared to the rhythm section, which the reviewer described as "just competent musicians, no more".

In 1940, the tune was among those affected by the ASCAP boycott. The dispute between the American Society of Composers, Authors and Publishers (ASCAP) and radio broadcasters focused on the increase in the price of song royalties. To counter the use of ASCAP tunes including "Stardust", Broadcast Music, Inc. was created, and the broadcasters did not renew their contract for the use of an estimated two million tunes. After nine months of negotiation, a settlement was reached in October 1941 and major networks aired the tunes again. In 1941, Don Byas recorded a version of "Stardust" featuring Thelonious Monk, as he was the house pianist at Minton's Playhouse. Monk disliked "Stardust": he described it as "a sad song ... if you know anything about music and harmony". He felt the melody was "lousy" and that performers have to "do a lot of figuring how to play that in order to make it sound good". Another version by Miller was released on the V-Disc label in 1943. During the 1940s, "Stardust" was recorded by multiple artists either as an instrumental song or as a romantic ballad by vocalists. For the period from July 1947 to July 1948, "Stardust" placed at number one on the Juke Box Standard Favorites poll Billboard conducted through juke box operators and using the Peatman Survey for radio audiences. According to Billboard, it "proved to be a nationwide favorite, drawing top votes from all parts of the country".

== Later recordings ==
In May 1953, according to jukebox operators, "Stardust" placed three times on the Ten Pop Standard Records list. Shaw's version topped the chart, while Dorsey and Miller's versions placed at numbers seven and eight, respectively. Ella Fitzgerald recorded the song, accompanied by Ellis Larkins on the piano. The tune was included on her 1954 album Songs in a Mellow Mood. Saturday Review described Fitzgerald as doing "absorbing things with 'Stardust'", while the Chicago Tribune considered the tune "completely in line with her magnificent singing". In 1954, when the copyright of 14 of his songs including "Stardust" was due for renewal, Carmichael sued Mills Music to receive total ownership or co-ownership of the compositions. Carmichael's contract with Mills Music granted the songwriter royalties in case any of his songs were published. He started his legal action on the grounds of "unconscionable advantage taken of him at the time the contracts were executed". Summary judgment was denied, as the court considered that "the assignee paid large royalties". In 1955, during the 25th anniversary of its publishing, Time estimated that Carmichael received a total of $250,000 in royalties for "Stardust", while the song made at the time $15,000 to $20,000 a year.

Producer Lee Gillette convinced Nat King Cole to include the song on his 1957 release Love Is the Thing. Cole initially refused to record it because of the number of renditions available at the time. Cole, who had been singing the song since 1954, declared: "I hate to sing Stardust, it wears me out". On its release, the song received good airplay. In 1957, Billy Ward and his Dominoes' version placed at number 12 on Billboard's Top 100. The same year, Pat Boone released a version on his album Star Dust, which reached number two on Billboard's Best selling LP's chart. Saxophonist John Coltrane recorded a ballad version in 1958 in what was later known as the Stardust Sessions, later released as the title track of his 1963 Stardust album. Sinatra's 1962 Sinatra and Strings album arranger Don Costa omitted Stardust's chorus, to instead focus the "musical and lyrical mind on all the neglected nuances of the verse". A review in The Rock Island Argus called Sinatra's "Stardust" his "choicest" track on the album and remarked on his "entirely new approach overlooking the perennially favored chorus".

Between 1958 and 1963, "Stardust" produced US$50,000 yearly in royalties for Mills Music. In 1964, Nino Tempo & April Stevens' version peaked at number 32 on Billboard's Top 100 and number 27 in Canada. Ringo Starr recorded the song featuring arrangements by Paul McCartney for his 1970 debut solo album, Sentimental Journey. In 1978, Willie Nelson recorded it as the title-track of his album of pop standards. In its review, the Gannett News Service felt that "Carmichael would be proud". Nelson's album topped Billboard's Top Country Albums, while reaching the summit on Billboard's Top LPs & Tapes. Stardust remained on the Billboard charts for 540 weeks until 1988. Of Nelson's version of "Stardust", National Public Radio commented: "Today, people who never heard of Isham Jones or Artie Shaw or even composer Hoagy Carmichael know his work thanks to Willie Nelson." Tiny Tim recorded the song with Brave Combo on what would be his final recording, the 1996 album Girl. Rod Stewart included the song on Stardust: The Great American Songbook, Volume III in 2004. In 2017, Bob Dylan recorded it for his three-disc set Triplicate, that covered American standards. Daniel Kreps of Rolling Stone considered that "Dylan's approach finds a pleasing, country-tinged arrangement" that the reviewer noted to be "somewhere between" Sinatra and Nelson's version.

== Legacy ==
"Stardust" is considered a part of the Great American Songbook. The song has been recorded over 1,500 times, and has been translated into 40 languages. The Encyclopædia Britannica has defined it as "one of the most renowned and most recorded standards in all of American music". Carmichael's 1927 version was inducted into the Grammy Hall of Fame in 1995. The 1940 recording of the song by Artie Shaw And His Orchestra was inducted into the Grammy Hall of Fame in 1988. National Public Radio included it on their NPR 100, a 1999 list of the 100 most important American musical works of the 20th century. For NPR, Susan Stamberg defined it as "an American song of longing, dreams, desires, [that] still stretches across the decades to touch the spirit of anyone who hears it". In 2004, the Library of Congress inducted Carmichael's "Stardust" into the National Recording Registry, which lists "culturally, historically or aesthetically important" music that "informs or reflects life" in the United States. In June 2026, CBS News included the song in its list of the 250 essential American songs of the past 250 years.

Carmichael's entry to the Songwriters Hall of Fame deemed the song "most notably one of the greatest standards" from the Jazz Age. Carmichael's biographer Richard Sudhalter attributed the song's popularity to "some combination of young Carmichael's heartland upbringing, Bix's uniquely bardic sensibility, and the unself-conscious emotional directness that characterizes much non-urban American pop music". Nelson's Stardust album was inducted into the Grammy Hall of Fame in 2015.

=== In popular culture ===
In 1938, Orson Welles's radio broadcast The War of the Worlds featured an excerpt of "Stardust" played by the fictional Ramón Raquello Orchestra. The 1961 episode "The Hit Songwriters" of The Flintstones featured a version by Fred Flintstone. Different versions of the song appeared in films, including Stardust Memories (1980), Goodfellas (1990), Another Man's Poison (1951), The Long Day Closes ( Terence Davies 1992) Sleepless in Seattle (1993), Casino (1995), The Aviator (2004), A Star Is Born (2018), and Captive State (2019). Carmichael's own short 1942 recording is featured at the start of closing credits in Nightmare Alley (2021). On YouTube that 1942 recording has garnered nearly 230,000 views of one posting alone.

On December 1, 2000, Nelson's version of "Stardust" was used to wake up the crew of Space Shuttle Endeavour's mission STS-108. The Caretaker sampled versions of the song for 2 of his albums; Marjorie Stedeford's version in We'll All Go Riding on a Rainbow and Charlie Spivak's version in Everywhere at the End of Time.

== Charts ==
Chart performance for "Stardust"
Year	Artist	Chart	Peak position
1941	Tommy Dorsey (featuring Frank Sinatra and the Pied Pipers)	US Billboard Hot 100	7
1941	Artie Shaw	US Billboard Hot 100	6
1943	Glenn Miller	US Billboard Hot 100	20
1957	Billy Ward and his Dominoes	US Billboard Hot 100	12
1964	Nino Tempo & April Stevens	US Billboard Hot 100	32
