= Claxtonola Records =

Claxtonola was a jazz record label founded in 1918 by the Brenard Manufacturing Company in Iowa City, Iowa. It reissued Paramount, Black Swan, and Gennett Records masters on the Claxtonola and National labels. The label closed in 1925. The company also sold phonographs.

== Discography ==
The company's recordings include:

The Wolverines:

- Oh Baby
- Copenhagen
- Susie
- Riverboat Shuffle
- Sensation
- Lazy Daddy

The Bucktown Five:

- Hot Mittens

Hitch's Happy Harmonists:

- Steady Steppin' Papa

Midway Gardens Orchestra:

- Tin Roof Blues
- Black Sheep Blues
- Lots 0' Mama
- Sobbin' Blues

Fletcher Henderson, on National:

- Aunt Hagar's Children
- My Sweetie Went Away

Jelly Roll Morton, on National:

- Muddy Water Blues

Sam Ash

- When Shall We Meet Again (4007-A)

Charles Harrison

- That's How I Believe in You(4007-B)

Eddie Peabody

- Tell Me Dreamy Eyes (40440-A)
- Indian Dawn - Minnetonka (40440-B)

The Seven Syncopaters

- Take Me (40415-A)
- Susquenna Home (40415-B)
