= Mitchell Parish =

American lyricist (1900–1993)

Background information
- Born: Michael Hyman Pashelinsky; July 10, 1900; Lithuania, Russian Empire
- Origin: New York City (Tin Pan Alley)
- Died: March 31, 1993 (aged 92) Manhattan, New York, United States
- Genres: Show tunes, jazz standards
- Occupation: Lyricist

Mitchell Parish (born Michael Hyman Pashelinsky; July 10, 1900 – March 31, 1993) was an American lyricist, notably as a writer of songs for stage and screen.

== Biography ==
Parish was born to a Jewish family in Lithuania, Russian Empire in July 1900. His family emigrated to the United States, arriving on February 3, 1901 aboard the SS Dresden when he was less than a year old. They settled first in Louisiana where his paternal grandmother had relatives, but later moved to New York City, where he grew up on the Lower East Side of Manhattan and received his education in the public schools.

He attended Columbia University and N.Y.U. and was a member of Phi Beta Kappa. He eventually abandoned the notion of practicing law to become a songwriter. He served his apprenticeship as a writer of special material for vaudeville acts, and later established himself as a writer of songs for stage, screen and numerous musical revues. By the late 1920s, Parish was a well-regarded Tin Pan Alley lyricist in New York City.

Parish's grandnephew, Steve Parish, was a roadie for the band Grateful Dead. He described Mitchell Parish's meeting with Jerry Garcia in his autobiography, Home Before Day Light.

== Career ==
His first steady employer was the music publisher Jack Mills, brother of Irving Mills, who signed him for $12 a week to write comedy lyrics for vaudeville acts and to be a song-plugger. His first hit, "Carolina Rolling Stone", was recorded by the musical comedy team Van and Schenck for Columbia Records in 1922. Parish tended to write his lyrics to completed melodies, hits that originated in other languages, or adaptations of classical music.

Hoagy Carmichael, Duke Ellington, Peter De Rose, Leroy Anderson, Glenn Miller, Sammy Fain, and Benny Goodman were among the composers. As one of the first inductees into the Songwriters Hall of Fame, the romantic quality of many of his lyrics such as "Stardust", "Stairway to the Stars", "Deep Purple", and "Moonlight Serenade" contributed to his being called by other songwriters "the poet laureate of the profession". In an interview in 1987, Parish claimed to have written the lyrics to the Duke Ellington standard "Mood Indigo", though they were credited to Irving Mills. He remained "somewhat rueful, though no longer bitter" about it.

His best-known works include the lyrics to songs such as "Stardust", "Sweet Lorraine", "Deep Purple", "Stars Fell on Alabama", "Sophisticated Lady", the translation to English lyrics of "Volare" and "Blue Skirt Waltz", "Moonlight Serenade", "Mr. Ghost Goes to Town", "Sleigh Ride", "One Morning in May", and "Louisiana Fairy Tale", which was the first theme song used in the PBS Production of This Old House.

Besides providing the lyrics to Hoagy Carmichael's "Stardust", the two collaborated on standards such as "Riverboat Shuffle" and "One Morning in May".

In 1949, Parish added lyrics to bandleader Al Goodman's tune "The Allen Stroll", which was played as radio comedian Fred Allen took a stroll down "Allen's Alley", a featured segment of Allen's weekly show. The new song, "Carousel of Love", premiered on The Fred Allen Show on April 4, 1949. It was sung by the DeMarco Sisters and played by Al Goodman and his Orchestra.

In 1950, he wrote lyrics to Leroy Anderson's "The Syncopated Clock". In 1951, he wrote the English lyrics of the French song "Maître Pierre" which was written in 1948 by Henri Betti (music) and Jacques Plante (lyrics). The title song became "The Windmill Song" and the song was recorded by The Andrews Sisters with Gordon Jenkins and his Orchestra.

He participated in the episode of To Tell the Truth aired on December 25, 1956, as a challenger.

In 1972, he was inducted into the Songwriters Hall of Fame. He is the recipient of their Johnny Mercer Award.

== Song lyrics (selected) ==
| Song title | Composer | Year | Notable recording | Label |
| All I Need is You (English lyrics, translated from French, written by Henri Contet) | | | | |
| All My Love (subtitle: "Bolero"). (English lyrics, translated from French, original lyrics by Henri Contet) | Paul Durand | 1950 | Patti Page (1950) | Mercury Records (catalog number #5455) |
| Blue Tango (instrumental composition, for orchestra) | Leroy Anderson | 1951 (written), 1952 (published) | Instrumental version recorded by Leroy Andersen (c. 1951/1952) | Decca Records (catalogue number; 27875) |
| Blue Skirt Waltz | | | | |
| Carolina Rolling Stone | | | | |
| Carousel of Love | | | | |
| Deep Purple (composition for piano, Parish wrote lyrics in 1938) | Peter Derose | 1933 | Larry Clinton and His Orchestra, featuring Bea Wain (23 December 1938) | Victor Records |
| Is That Religion? | Maceo Pinkard | 1930 | | |
| The Lamp Is Low | Peter Derose, Bert Shefter | 1930s | (1) Mildred Bailey (April 24, 1939) (2) Tommy Dorsey and His Orchestra, with vocal by Jack Leonard (May 1, 1939) | Vocalion Records (catalogue number #4845) (2) Victor Records (catalogue number. 26259) |
| Louisiana Fairy Tale (written with J. Fred Coots) | Haven Gillespie | 1935 | Fats Waller | |
| Moonlight Serenade | Glenn Miller | 1939 | Glenn Miller (1939) | |
| Mr. Ghost Goes to Town | | | | |
| One Morning in May | Hoagy Carmichael | 1933 | Hoagy Carmichael, recorded October 10, 1933 | Victor Records |
| Organ Grinder's Swing (written with Irving Mills) | Will Hudson | 1936 | Jimmy Lunceford and Orchestra | |
| Riverboat Shuffle | Hoagy Carmichael, Irving Mills and Dick Voynow | 1924 | Bix Beiderbecke and The Wolverines | |
| Ruby (theme song from film Ruby Gentry) | Heinz Roemheld | 1952 | Les Baxter and His Orchestra (featuring harmonica solo by Danny Welton) (1953) | |
| Sleigh Ride | Leroy Anderson | 1948 | Arthur Fiedler and the Boston Pops Orchestra (1949) | RCA Red Seal Records |
| Sometime | Glenn Miller, Chummy MacGregor, Mitchell Parish | 1939 | Glenn Miller | RCA Victor |
| Sophisticated Lady | Duke Ellington | | | |
| Stairway to the Stars | Matty Malneck, Frank Signorelli | | Glenn Miller and His Orchestra featuring Ray Eberle (recorded May 9, 1939) | |
| Stardust | Hoagy Carmichael | 1927 | Hoagy Carmichael and His Pals | |
| Stars Fell on Alabama | Frank Perkins | 1934 | Guy Lombardo Orchestra, featuring Carmen Lombardo performing vocals | Decca Records (catalogue number #104) |
| Sweet Lorraine | Cliff Burwell | 1928 | Nat King Cole | Capitol Records |
| The Syncopated Clock | Leroy Anderson | 1945 | Leroy Anderson recorded in 1950 | Decca Records |
| Volare (Nei blu di Pinto di blu) | Domenico Modugno | | 1 February 1958 | |
| The Windmill Song (original French lyrics by Jacques Plante) | Henri Betti | 1948 | The Andrews Sisters, featuring Gordon Jenkins and His Orchestra | |

== Work on Broadway ==
- Continental Varieties (1935) - revue - featured lyricist
- Lew Leslie's Blackbirds of 1939 (1939) - revue - performer
- Earl Carroll's Vanities of 1940 (1940) - revue - featured lyricist
- Bubbling Brown Sugar (1976) - revue - featured lyricist
- Sophisticated Ladies (1981) - featured lyricist for "Sophisticated Lady"
- Stardust (1987) - revue - lyricist

== Death ==
Parish died in 1993 in Manhattan, New York at the age of 92. He was buried in Beth David Cemetery in Elmont, New York.
