= Hitch's Happy Harmonists =

US musical group

Hitch's Happy Harmonists (a.k.a. The Happy Harmonists, active 1922–27) was an early jazz band from Evansville, Indiana which played on the first recordings by Hoagy Carmichael: "Bone Yard Shuffle" and "Washboard Blues".

The band was led by the pianist Curtis Hitch and included Fred Rollison, Jerry Bump, Rookie Neal, Dewey Neal, Maurice May, Earl McDowell, Harry Wright, Arnold Abbe, and Haskell Simpson

The band recorded a total of nine sides on 78s released by Gennett Records, Claxtonola Records, Buddy Records, Champion Records and Temple Records. Their style echoed the New Orleans Rhythm Kings and they were influenced by Bix Beiderbecke and The Wolverines.
