= Husk O'Hare =

American jazz bandleader and impresario (1896–1970)

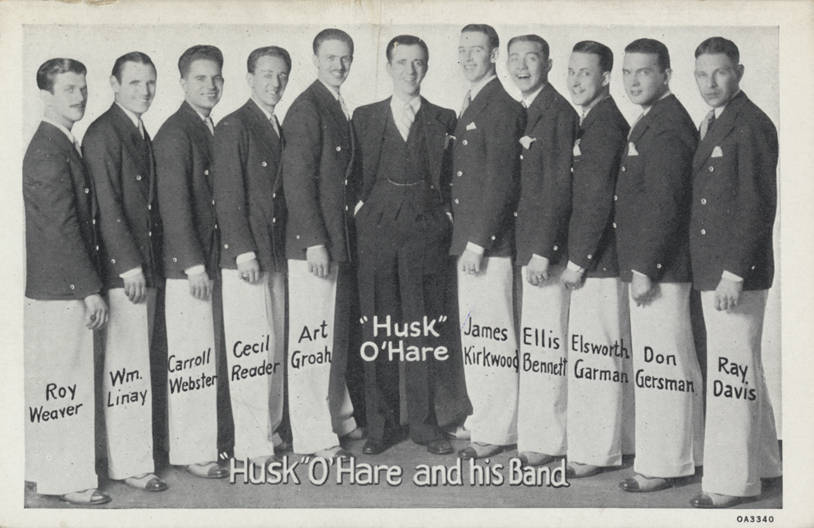
"Husk" O'Hare And His Band in 1930

Husk O'Hare (October 27, 1896 in Chicago – April 19, 1970 in Chicago) was an American jazz bandleader and impresario active during the 1920s and 1930s.

O'Hare served in the United States Army and was discharged in 1921. Following this he was a booking manager for the Chicago-based group Friar's Society Orchestra, who would later be known as the New Orleans Rhythm Kings. Soon afterwards he formed his own ensemble, the Blue Friars, which he later called O'Hare's Red Dragons and O'Hare's Wolverines. O'Hare had bought the rights to the name Wolverines from Dick Voynow, who was a member of The Wolverines, and O'Hare performed under this name for several years, playing as a territory band in the mid-Atlantic and Ohio. His sidemen in the 1920s included Muggsy Spanier, Floyd O'Brien, and Jim Lanigan. He recorded for Gennett Records and Decca Records and led bands for most of the 1930s, in addition to managing dozens of other ensembles. In the early 1940s he left music to work in manufacturing.
