= We Get Letters =

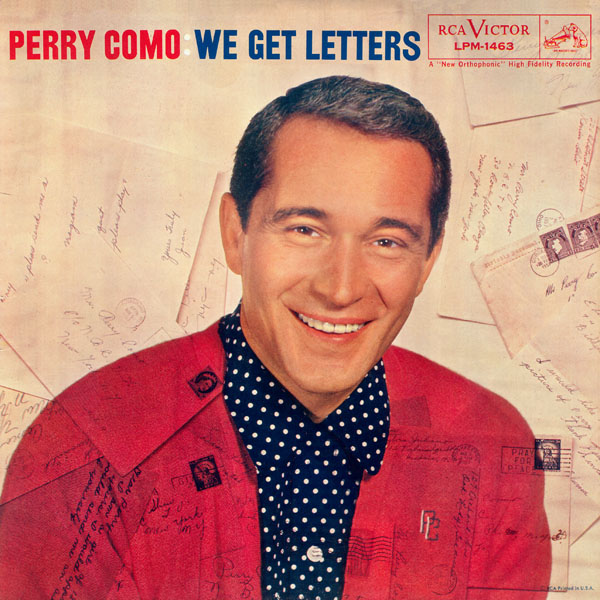

Studio album by Perry Como
- Released: April 1957
- Recorded: June 18, 1956, February 12, 19, 1957
- Studio: RCA Victor Studios 2 & 3, New York City
- Genre: Vocal, jazz
- Length: 31:52
- Label: RCA Victor
- Producer: Ed O. Welker

Perry Como chronology
Relaxing with Perry Como (1956)	We Get Letters (1957)	Saturday Night with Mr. C (1958)

Professional ratings
Review scores
Source	Rating
Allmusic	5/5 stars

We Get Letters is a 1957 album by Perry Como, his second RCA Victor 12" long-play album.

== Overview ==
The LP's concept is an album of requests from Como's television show, but forgoing the usual big-band sound of Mitchell Ayres' Orchestra and the Ray Charles Singers for a small group known as "Como's little Combo", with soft, breezy jazz arrangements by Joe Lipman. The album was recorded between June 1956 and February 1957.

As with his first LP So Smooth, Como avoided the type of novelty songs he often recorded for single releases in favor of pop standards dating back to the 1920s and 30s.

The album reached No. 8 on the Billboard Best Selling Pop Albums chart, staying on the chart for ten weeks.

== Track listing ==
Side one

1. "Swingin' Down the Lane" (Music by Isham Jones and lyrics by Gus Kahn, 1923) - 2:13
2. "It's Easy To Remember" (Music by Richard Rodgers and lyrics by Lorenz Hart, 1935) - 3:15
3. "South of The Border" (Words and Music by Jimmy Kennedy and Michael Carr, 1939) - 2:17
4. "That's What I Like" (Words and Music by Mae Boren Axton and Glenn Reeves) - 2:38
5. "Honey, Honey (Bless Your Heart)" (Music by Larry Stock and lyrics by Dominick Belline) - 2:41
6. "Angry" (Music by Henry Brunies and Jules Cassard with lyrics by Dudley Mecum, 1925) - 2:20

Side two

1. "They Can't Take That Away From Me" (Music by George Gershwin and lyrics by Ira Gershwin, 1937) - 2:30
2. "Sposin'" (Music by Paul Denniker and lyrics by Andy Razaf, 1929) - 3:39
3. "I Had the Craziest Dream" (Music by Harry Warren and lyrics by Mack Gordon, 1942) - 2:36
4. "'Deed I Do" (Music by Fred Rose and lyrics by Walter Hirsch, 1926) - 1:58
5. "Somebody Loves Me" (Music by George Gershwin and lyrics by Ballard MacDonald and B.G. DeSylva, 1924) - 3:20
6. "Sleepy Time Gal" (Music by Ange Lorenzo and Richard A. Whiting with lyrics by Joseph R. Alden and Raymond B. Egan, 1925) - 2:18

== Charts ==
Chart (1957)	Peak position
US Billboard Best Selling Pop Albums	8
US Cash Box Best Selling Pop Albums	10
