= Rosy McHargue =

American jazz clarinetist (1902–1999)

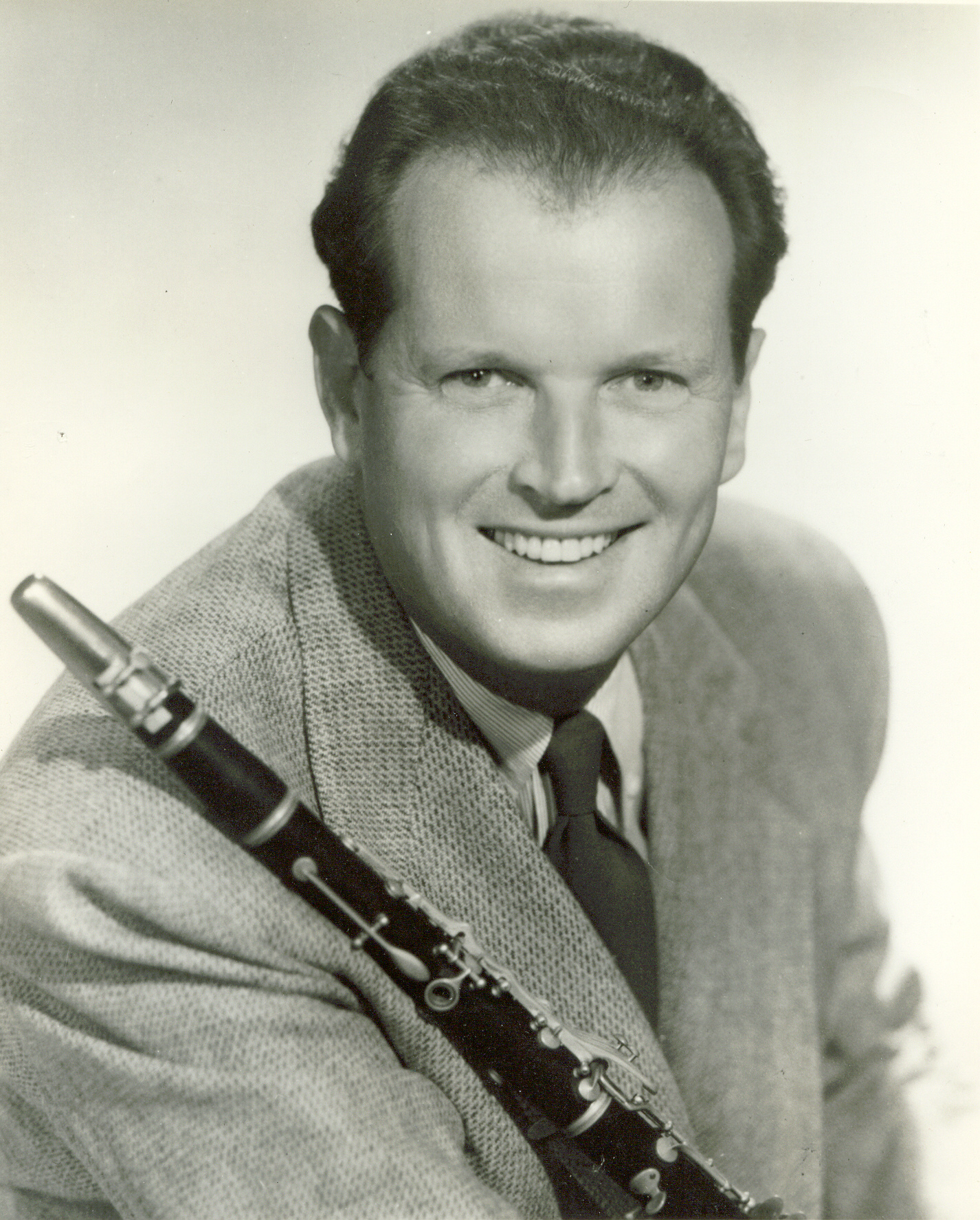
Rosy McHargue publicity photo, c. 1952

James "Rosy" McHargue (April 6, 1902 in Danville, Illinois – June 8, 1999 in Santa Monica, California) was an American jazz clarinetist, associated principally with the Dixieland jazz scene.

McHargue worked professionally from age 15, with The Novelty Syncopators in 1917. His first recordings were with Roy Schoenbeck's Orchestra in 1922 on the track "Wow Wow Blues"; he also recorded early on with the Seattle Harmony Kings (1925), Frankie Trumbauer (1931), Ted Weems (1934), and Jimmy McPartland (1936). He was a member of The Wolverines shortly after Bix Beiderbecke's departure in 1925. His tenure with Weems lasted from 1934 to 1942.

McHargue then moved to Los Angeles, where he played with Eddie Miller, Benny Goodman, Kay Kyser (1943–46), and Red Nichols (1947-51). He later played with Pee Wee Hunt and Pete Daily, and recorded as a leader for Jump, Fairmont, Audiophile, and Protone in the 1940s and 1950s.

In his old age, McHargue began singing and became extraordinarily active in the jazz preservation movement, working with historians in interviews and recalling the tunes and lyrics to many forgotten songs from the 1920s and earlier. He recorded again for Stomp Off in 1992 and played jazz festivals into the late 1990s.
