= Min Leibrook =

American jazz musician (1903–1943)

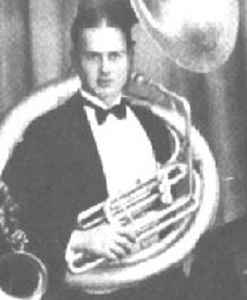
Leibrook in 1924

Wilford F. Min Leibrook (January 18, 1903 - June 8, 1943) was an American jazz tubist, bass saxophonist and double bassist.

== Life and career ==
Wilford F. (Min) Leibrook was born in Hamilton, Ohio on January 18, 1903. He began as a cornetist before switching to tuba and bass. In the 1920s he played in the Ten Foot Band in Chicago. Leibrook played in The Wolverines in 1924 alongside Bix Beiderbecke, where he made his first recordings, and later joined the band of Arnold Johnson.

In 1927 Leibrook moved to New York City, where he played in the Paul Whiteman Orchestra until 1931. During this time he began recording on bass saxophone, mostly with small jazz groups from the Whiteman band under Beiderbecke and Frankie Trumbauer.

He worked later in the 1930s with Lennie Hayton and Eddie Duchin, mostly on string bass. In 1936 he played in the group The Three T's, with Trumbauer, Jack Teagarden, and Charlie Teagarden.

By the late 1930s, Leibrook moved to Los Angeles and worked as a bassist in Manny Strand’s Band at the Earl Carroll Theater. He never recorded as a leader.

Leibrook died at age 40 as a result of meningitis. He is buried in Forest Lawn Memorial Park, Glendale.
