= Vic Berton =

American jazz drummer (1896–1951)

Vic Berton (born Victor Cohen; May 6, 1899 – December 26, 1951) was an American jazz drummer.

Berton was born, Victor Cohen, in Chicago, Illinois, United States. His father was a violinist and began his son on string instruments around age five. He was hired as a percussionist at the Alhambra Theater in Milwaukee in 1903 when he was only seven years old. By age 16, he was playing with the Milwaukee Symphony Orchestra and the Chicago Symphony Orchestra. While serving in World War I he played drums for John Philip Sousa's Navy band.

Early in the 1920s, Berton played in Chicago bands, including those of Art Kahn, Paul Beise, and Arnold Johnson. He led his own ensemble as well, which played at the Merry Gardens club. In 1924, he became the manager of The Wolverines, and occasionally played alongside Bix Beiderbecke in the ensemble. Later in the decade, he played with Roger Wolfe Kahn, Don Voorhees, and Red Nichols, and worked extensively as a session musician. In 1927, he played with Paul Whiteman, and then moved to Los Angeles later that year.

In Los Angeles, Berton played with Abe Lyman and recorded in studios for film soundtracks. He served as director of Paramount Films's music division for a time, and worked in the Los Angeles Philharmonic Orchestra. In the 1940s, he worked as a percussionist in the studios for 20th Century Fox. He died in Hollywood from lung cancer.

Berton's brother, Ralph Berton, also became a jazz drummer, in addition to his writings on jazz.
