= Angry (1925 song) =

1925 song written by Dudley Mecum

Song
- Written: 1924
- Composer(s): Henry Brunies; Merritt Brunies; Jules Cassard
- Lyricist(s): Dudley Mecum

"Angry" is a popular song, with music by Henry Brunies, Merritt Brunies, and Jules Cassard, composed in 1924. Lyrics by Dudley Mecum were added when the song was published in printed form in the following year,1925.

The song was first recorded in an instrumental version by Merritt Brunies and his Friars Inn Orchestra for Autograph Records in Chicago in November 1924. Ted Lewis and His Band recorded their own instrumental version on June 22, 1925, and then on June 26, 1925, The Whispering Pianist (Art Gillham) recorded the first vocal version.

The song is considered a barbershop quartet standard and was used as the signature song of popular big band bandleader leader Harry Lawrence "Tiny" Hill. Hill made three recordings of the song, the first being on Vocalion Records #4957 on June 1, 1939. Hill's later recordings were both released on Mercury Records in 1946 #1053 (recorded 1945) and #6001.

== Other notable versions ==
- Rosemary Clooney - for her album Rosie Solves the Swingin' Riddle! (1961).
- Perry Como - included in his album We Get Letters (1957).
- Earl Hines and his orchestra recorded the song on 13 September 1934 for Decca Records (catalog No. 183A), in an arrangement by bassist Quinn Wilson.
- Kay Starr - a single release that reached No. 26 in the Billboard charts in 1951.
