= Bernie Cummins =

American drummer

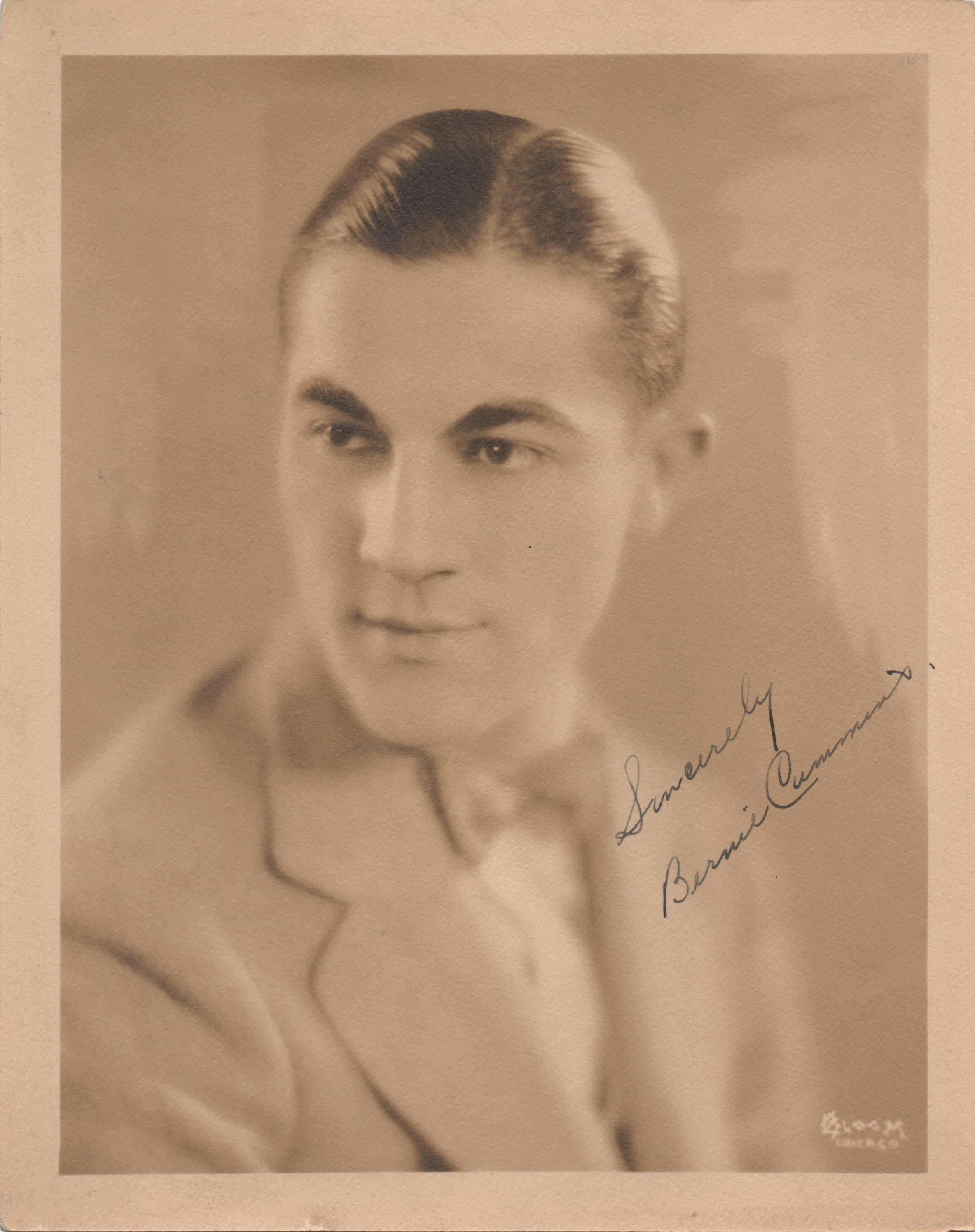

Background information
- Birth name: Bernard Joseph Cummins
- Born: March 14, 1900
- Origin: Akron, Ohio, USA
- Died: September 22, 1986 (aged 86)
- Genres: Jazz, big band, swing
- Occupation(s): Musician, bandleader
- Instrument(s): Drums, percussion
- Years active: 1919–1959
- Formerly of: The Wolverines, Charlie Callas

Bernard Joseph Cummins (March 14, 1900 – September 22, 1986) was an American jazz drummer and bandleader.

== Early years ==
Cummins was born on March 14, 1900, in Akron, Ohio. In his youth, Cummins was a boxer, besides playing drums in local bands in Ohio. His parents, Mary and Michael J. Cummins, were Irish immigrants, and his father was a leading temperance worker in Ohio. He had eight siblings. He was a student at St. Vincent High School.

== Orchestras ==
In 1919 he created a small ensemble of his own, which debuted in Indiana and which grew gradually into a larger dance band after he moved to Cincinnati in 1923.

Singers in the band included Dorothy Crane, Jerry Lang, Betty Griffin, Bernie's brother Walter Cummins and Scottee Marsh, who sang later with Tommy Dorsey.

A female singing trio known as the Sophisticates was hired by Bernie in the mid-1930s out of Minneapolis Marshall High School about the time the Andrews Sisters from Minneapolis North High School became popular. Charlie Callas and Randy Brooks also played with the band, as did Tommy Dorsey for a time. Besides his activities as bandleader, Cummins was briefly also the manager of The Wolverines.

== Recordings ==
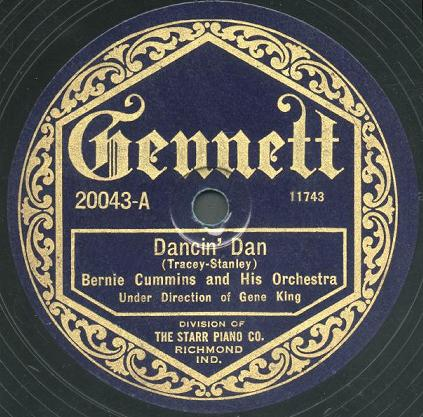
Label on Bernie Cummins' recording of "Dancin' Dan" on Gennett

The Bernie Cummins Orchestra recorded frequently for such labels as Brunswick, Columbia, Victor, Decca, Gennett, Vocalion and Bluebird.

== Personal appearances ==
The band had many appearances in the Mid-West and was well known for its live performances; its smooth style was much loved in larger hotels and ballrooms. They played many times at the Biltmore Hotel and the Hotel New Yorker in New York City, the Trianon, Aragon, Blackstone and the Edgewater Beach Hotel and Palmer House in Chicago, as well as further appearances in Dallas, Kansas City, New Orleans, Denver, San Francisco and Saint Paul. Cummins' band also played on radio shows including the Spotlight Dance Program sponsored by Coca-Cola, and The Fitch Bandwagon.

In the late 1950s it became increasingly difficult for the band to find gigs, but the group continued to play clubs in Las Vegas, at such places as The Flamingo, El Rancho and Last Frontier, before it dissolved it 1959.

== Theme ==
Cummins' orchestra's theme song was "Dark Eyes".

== Later years ==
Cummins retired to Boca Raton, Florida.

== Personal life and death ==
Cummins married Katherine Mahoney in New York City in 1930. He died September 22, 1986, in Palm Beach, Florida. He was 86.

== Discography ==
- Bernie Cummins & his Orchestra (1924-1930) (Timeless Records)
