= Floyd O'Brien =

American jazz trombonist (1904–1968)

Floyd O'Brien (May 7, 1904 – November 26, 1968) was an American jazz trombonist.

He was born in Chicago, Illinois, United States. O'Brien first played in Chicago in the 1920s with the Austin High School Gang; later in the decade he played with Earl Fuller, Floyd Town, Charles Pierce, Thelma Terry, and Husk O'Hare. During 1930-31 he worked in a pit band at a theater in Des Moines, Iowa. He moved to New York City and played with Mal Hallett, Joe Venuti, Smith Ballew, Mike Durso (1933–34), Phil Harris (1935–39), Gene Krupa (1939–40), and Bob Crosby (1940–42).

In 1943, he relocated to Los Angeles and played with Eddie Miller, Bunk Johnson, Shorty Sherock, Jack Teagarden, and Wingy Manone. In 1948, he moved back to Chicago and there worked with Bud Freeman, Art Hodes and Danny Alvin. O'Brien had recorded with Freeman as early as 1928; other recordings include with Eddie Condon (1933 and later), Fats Waller, Mezz Mezzrow, George Wettling (1940), Charles LaVere (1944), Albert Nicholas (1959), and Smokey Stover. His lone session as a bandleader yielded two singles for Jump Records in 1945, which were also released under LaVere's name.
