= 42nd Street (song) =

Song by Ruby Keeler, Dick Powell & Ensemble
- Released: 1933
- Genre: Musicals
- Label: Warner Bros.
- Composer(s): Harry Warren
- Lyricist(s): Al Dubin

"42nd Street" is the title song from the 1933 Warner Bros. backstage musical film 42nd Street, with music by Harry Warren and lyrics by Al Dubin. The song was published in 1932. It is the finale of the film, where it was sung by Ruby Keeler, Dick Powell and ensemble. It was used again in 1980 when the film was adapted as a long-running Broadway musical. In 2004 the song placed #97 in AFI's 100 Years...100 Songs survey of the top tunes in American cinema.

== Cover versions ==
- Popular recordings in 1933 were by Don Bestor & His Orchestra (vocal by Dudley Mecum) and by Hal Kemp & His Orchestra (vocal by Skinnay Ennis).
- The Boswell Sisters also recorded the song on April 11, 1933, for Brunswick Records (catalog No. 6545A).
- Joseph Robichaux and his New Orleans Rhythm Boys recorded a hot jazz instrumental version on August 25, 1933.
- Mel Torme – Mel Tormé Sings Sunday in New York & Other Songs About New York (1964).
- Frankie Vaughan – Love Hits and High Kicks (1985).
- Diana Krall – Stepping Out (1993).
- Cherry Poppin' Daddies – The Boop-A-Doo (2016).

== In popular culture ==
Warner Bros. musical director Carl Stalling frequently used elements from the song in urban cartoon settings.

The music inspired the title song to the Indian Hindi language film Sabse Bada Rupaiya. The song "Sabse Bada Rupaiya" would be used again in another Indian "Bollywood" film Bluffmaster (2005).

The song was parodied as "40 Cubic Feet" in the television series The Drew Carey Show as part of a musical number set inside a giant refrigerator.
