= Is That Religion? =

Is That Religion? is a May 1930 satirical American big band jazz song that incorporates elements of gospel music, including lyrics of the traditional Negro spiritual All God's Chillun Got Shoes. It was composed by Maceo Pinkard, with lyrics by Mitchell Parish.

In 1933, Mildred Bailey recorded a version of it with The Dorsey Brothers. In a retrospective review, Colin Bratkovich criticized Bailey's performance for "attempt to sound black".
