= Jazz Time =

Studio album by Red Nichols and his Five Pennies
- Released: 1950
- Genre: Traditional jazz
- Label: Capitol

Professional ratings
Review scores
Source	Rating
Allmusic	3/5 stars

Jazz Time is a studio album by Red Nichols and his Five Pennies released by Capitol records in 1950 as a 10–inch LP record H 215. The album collects 7 different track from three sessions between 1944 and 1949. The first and last tracks, those recorded in 1949, were also released ad as 45 rpm set EBF-215. The album features traditional jazz, or as one review put it, "dixieland madness".

== Track listing ==
1. Glory, Hallelujah (traditional)
2. When You Wish Upon a Star (Leigh Harline – Ned Washington)
3. Little By Little (Walter O'Keefe – Bobby Dolan)
4. You're My Everything (Warren – Dixon – Young)
5. Love Is the Sweetest Thing (Ray Noble)
6. If I Had You (Shapiro – Cambell – Connelly)
7. River–Boat Shuffle (Voynow – Carmichael – Mills)

== Personnel ==
Tracks 3 & 6 - recorded in Hollywood, Ca., October 18, 1944

Red Nichols (cnt) Floyd O'Brien (tb-1) Heinie Beau (cl) Don Lodice (ts) Earl Sturgis (p) Gene Englund (b) Frank Carlson (d)

Tracks 2, 4 & 5– recorded in Los Angeles, June 28, 1945

Red Nichols and his Five Pennies: Red Nichols (cnt) Heinie Beau (cl) Herbie Haymer (ts) Paul Leu (p) Thurman Teague (b) Rollie Culver (d

Tracks 1 & 7 – recorded in New York, November 12, 1949

Red Nichols (cnt,arr) King Jackson (tb) Rosy McHargue (cl) Joe Rushton (bassax) Bob Hammack (p) Doc Whiting (b) Rollie Culver (d) Kay Starr (vcl)
