= Majestic Radios =

Former American radio brand

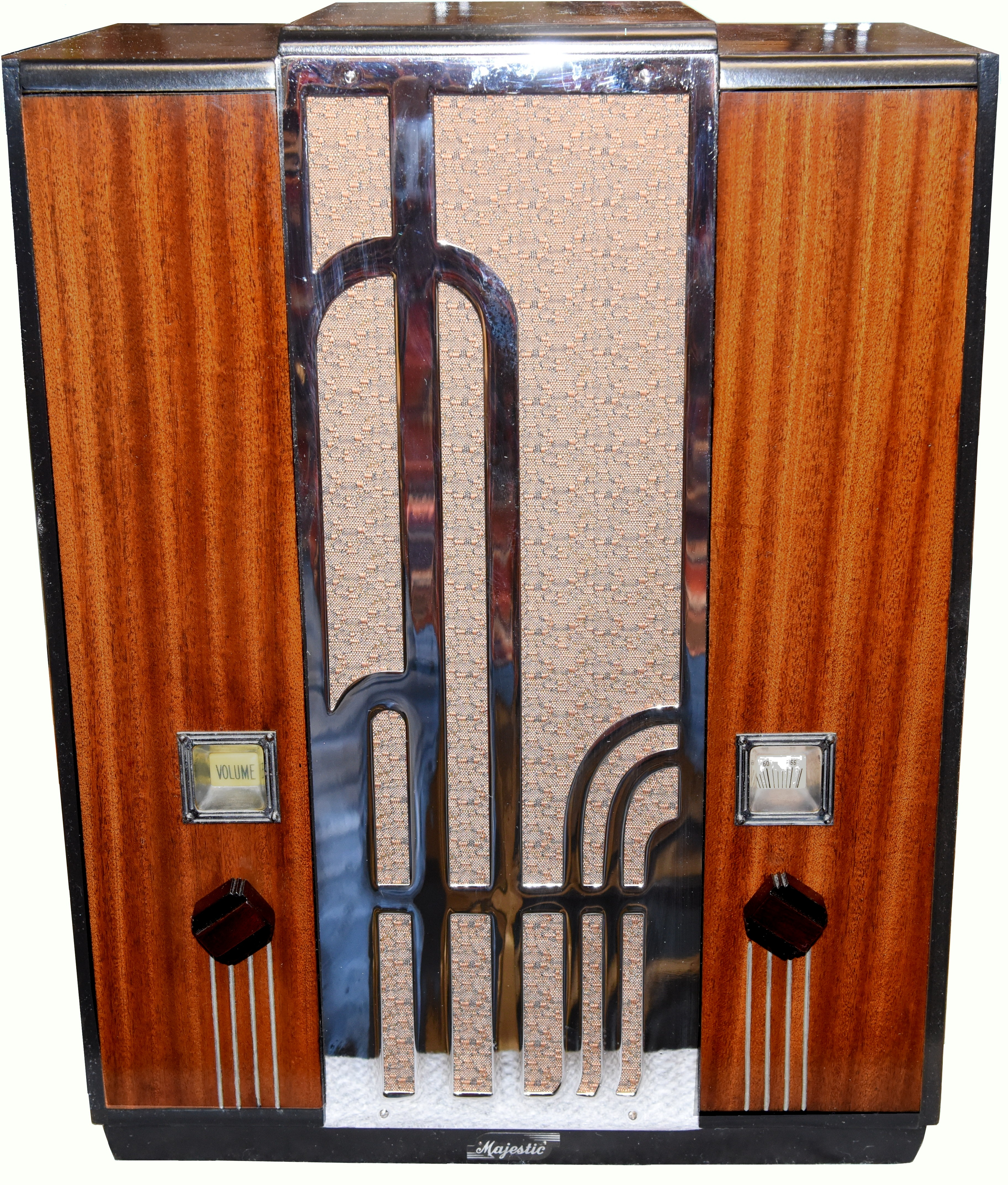
Model 161, introduced in 1933

Majestic Radios was an American radio brand from 1927 to 1955, trademarked as "The Mighty Monarchs of the Air". Noted for their high quality, they were initially manufactured by the Grigsby-Grunow Company of Chicago. After Grigsby-Grunow's demise in 1934 during the Great Depression, Majestic Radios continued to be made through subsequent corporate ownership changes and reorganizations for another twenty-two years. The Majestic Radio & Television Corporation was formed to produce the radios in the 1930s and 1940s. Following Majestic Radio & Television's liquidation in 1949, Majestic-brand radios were made by a division of the Wilcox-Gay Corporation at their Michigan factory in the 1950s.

== Grigsby-Grunow years (1927–1934) ==
=== Formation and development ===
Before embarking on radio manufacturing, the Grigsby-Grunow Company had started in 1921 as the Grigsby-Grunow-Hinds Company in Chicago, making such automotive aftermarket items as its "Premier" brand of sun visors. co-founded by Bertram James Grigsby and William Carl Grunow, an Army major in World War I. By 1927, the company had annual nationwide sales of $5 million in manufacturing products such as "Majestic" battery eliminators for home radios. The device, developed by inventor William Lear for Grigsby-Grunow, eliminated the need for a cumbersome array of lead-acid batteries and chargers to power radio receivers of the time. With the growing popularity of commercial broadcasting and the development of nationwide networks in the prosperous 1920s, there was increasing consumer demand for better audio quality and console radios suitable for the living room or parlor of American households.

In 1927, Grigsby-Grunow (by then, Hinds was no longer a part of the enterprise) began making "Majestic" radios featuring dynamic speakers with moving-coils and advanced circuitry employing screen-grid tubes for improved reception. The Majestic Model #71 introduced in 1927, for example, was a tuned radio frequency receiver with a 9-inch (23 cm) speaker, powered from AC house current. This was a considerable improvement over previous radios having typically poor selectivity and producing inferior sound from old-fashioned horn speakers or earphones. Majestic radios were highly regarded for their handsome cabinetry and superior loudspeaker quality. Model #131, a floor console made in 1930, had an 8-tube circuit for high sensitivity and selectivity, along with a 12-inch (30 cm) speaker.

=== The "Roaring Twenties" ===
To promote its radio sales, Grigsby-Grunow sponsored The Majestic Theater of the Air musical show on the CBS radio network beginning in October, 1928. By 1928, the company enjoyed booming sales and had become the second largest U.S. radio manufacturer, behind RCA and ahead of Atwater-Kent. Grigsby-Grunow was producing 4,000 radios a day and shipping them by the trainload nationwide, newspapers reported. Majestic's trademarked slogan was "The Mighty Monarch of the Air" and its advertising in 1930 touted a 40 percent market share of U.S. and Canada radio sales. Prices ranged from $126.50 to $235 in 1930 (equivalent to $1,890–$3,500 in 2020), with installment purchase plans offered by retail dealers. In a March, 1930, review, the Charlotte Observer said the Majestic brand was "famous the world over for its excellent reception and colorful tone", with "striking yet tasteful cabinet designs". Indeed, so highly regarded were the radios that Graf Zeppelin navigator Max Pruss purchased a set in 1929 while his dirigible was moored at Lakehurst Naval Air Station, to take back to his home in Germany. Graf Zeppelin captain Hugo Eckener had purchased his own set on a previous visit to the United States.

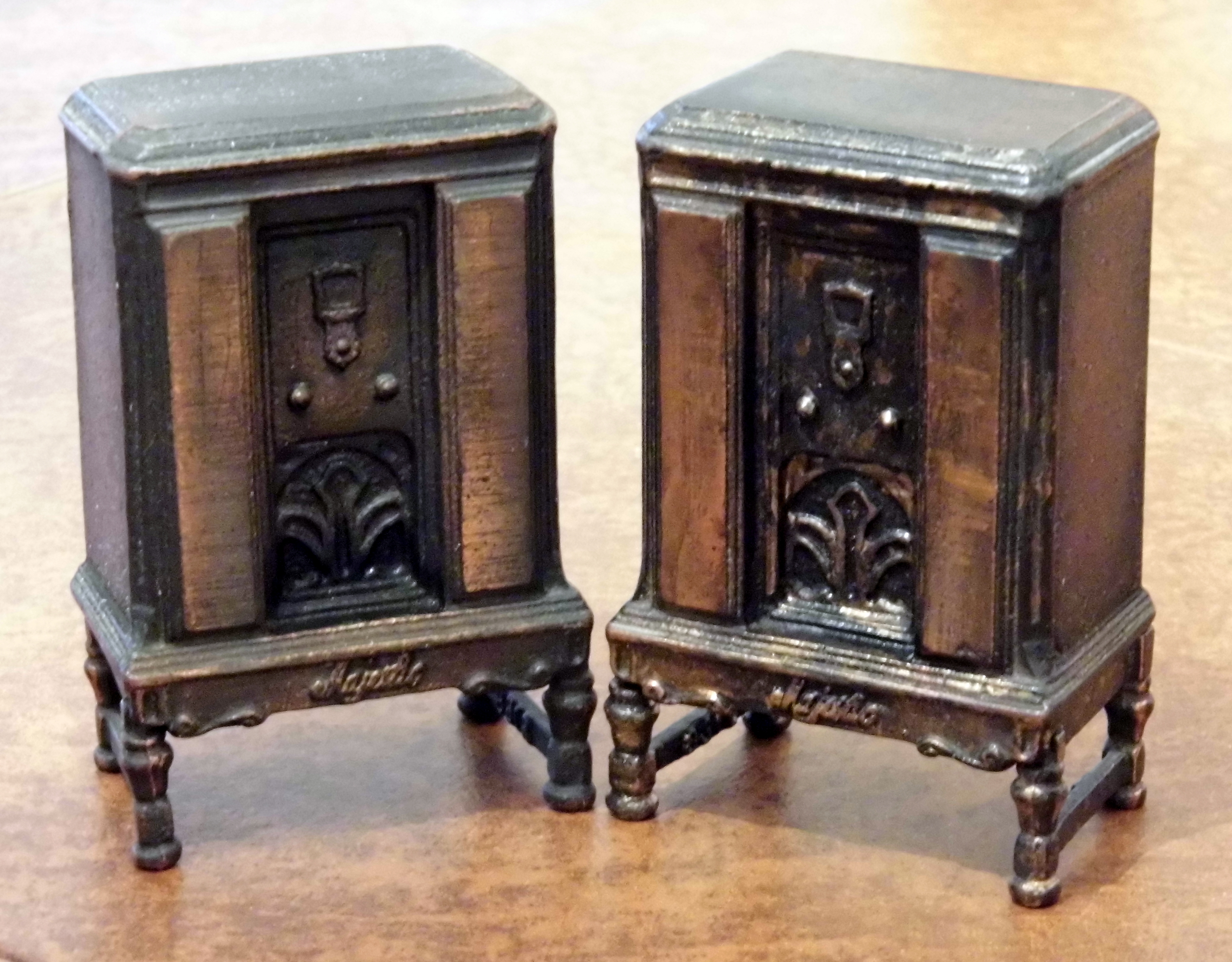
Iron banks modeled after the iconic Majestic name and look

At its peak in 1930, Grigsby-Grunow employed 11,000 workers at its Chicago factory and sales reached $61 million annually. Its stock price had reached dizzying heights and was called "the sensation of the Chicago Exchange" by Time magazine: a share purchased at $40 in 1928 had risen to $1,100 in value at its 1929 peak (taking into account multiple 4-for-1 stock splits). Radio stocks as a new technology were particularly attractive in the rush to buy common stocks during the Roaring Twenties. As Thurman Arnold wrote in 1965: "Economists argued that when you buy common stocks, you buy the future, not the present. Names like Auburn, Grigsby-Grunow, Kolster Radio – names you no longer hear of – flashed across the ticker tape".

=== The Depression years ===
After the Wall Street Crash of 1929, Grigsby-Grunow's stock began a steep decline, eventually down to $18.00 per share, equal to $339 today. In April, 1930, the company announced the formation of Majestic Household Utilities, a new subsidiary to manufacture refrigerators and other appliances, such as vacuum cleaners and washing machines, and deliveries of Majestic refrigerators began in October. A $9 million plant expansion (equal to $169,404,382 today) was undertaken to produce 600 all-electric refrigerators daily. A company distributor said Majestic's refrigerators would have "several new mechanical features" to make them silent-running and 30 percent more energy efficient that competing brands. Ominously, however, Time magazine was reporting on the unsold inventory of Majestic radios and decreasing company revenue by June, 1930, as consumers curtailed spending on luxury items, saying, "the radio industry is a ... sufferer in time of depression". As the Great Depression worsened, the company faced a number of patent infringement lawsuits and declining sales for its expensive console models. Grunow, notoriously irascible by nature, was forced out as president in 1931 as sales declined. He went on to start General Household Utilities in 1933 to manufacture Grunow refrigerators and radios, but it went out of business in 1939.

The Majestic "Smart Set" line of less expensive, but stylish, table radios was introduced in mid-1933 and enjoyed strong sales. The model 161 (pictured at top) produced in 1933 was a superheterodyne receiver with Art Deco-style chrome decorative trim adorning the loudspeaker grill cloth and a hand-rubbed mahogany cabinet, having a list price of $47.50, equal to $1,154 today. Nonetheless, Grigsby-Grunow declared bankruptcy in November, 1933, and ended production of Majestic Radios in February, 1934. When the bankruptcy court rejected its reorganization plan, Grigsby-Grunow was forced into liquidation in June, 1934, at the urging of creditors and bondholders. The bankruptcy court ordered the trustee to establish a Refrigeration Service Department to service Majestic refrigerators and sell parts, along with parts for Majestic radios.

== Majestic Radio & Television years (1936–1949) ==
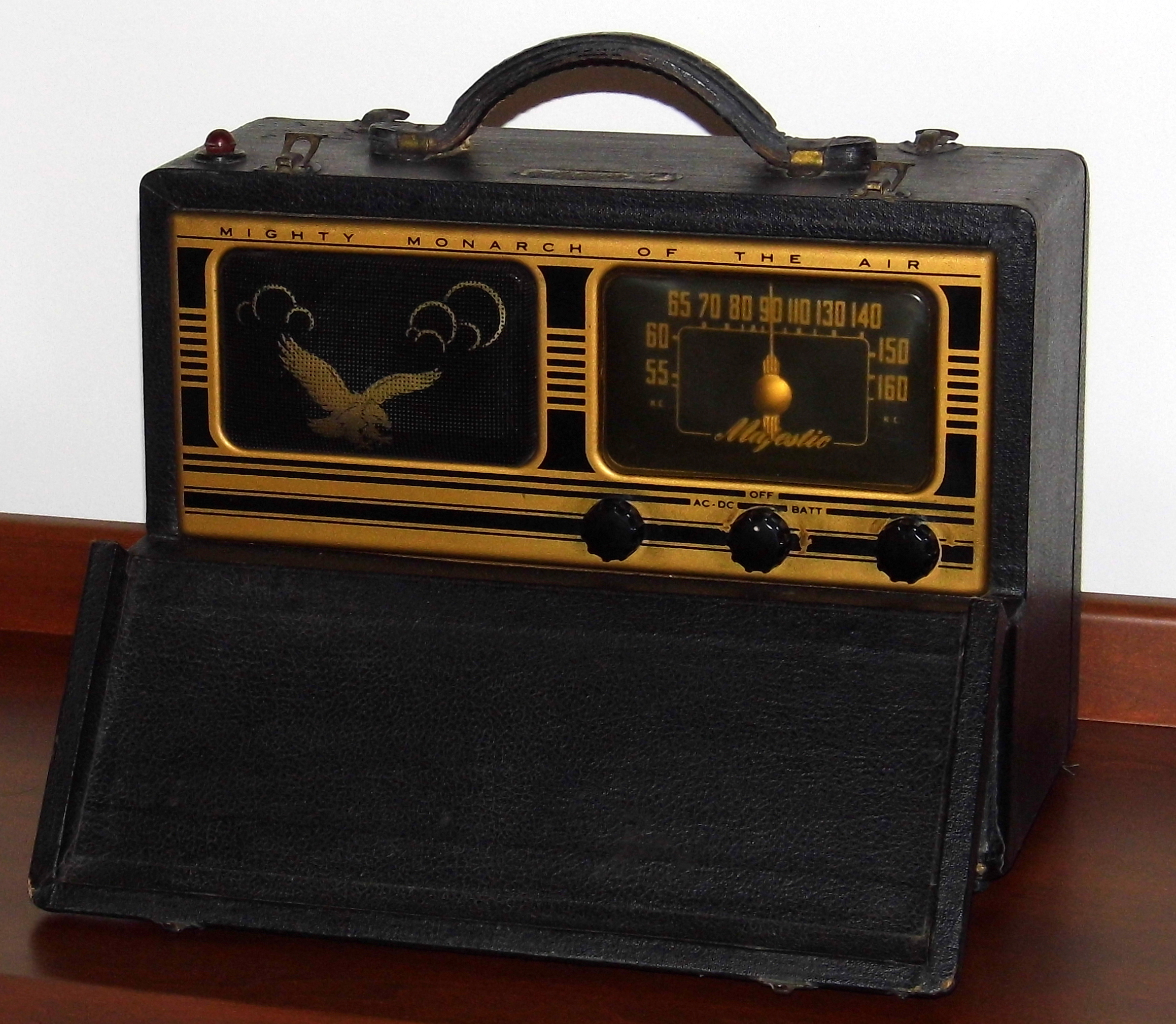
Majestic portable radio (1947)

In 1936, the assets of the defunct Grigsby-Grunow company were acquired by a new investment group, led by Zenith Radio. Included in the acquisition were the trademarks "Majestic Radio" and "The Mighty Monarch of the Air", along with unsold inventory, manufacturing equipment, and Grigsby-Grunow's former Chicago factory, which Zenith needed for its own expansion plans. The Majestic Radio & Television Corporation was formed, with stock in the new company offered at $3.75 per share (equal to $84.97 today) in October, 1936, to raise working capital and facilitate business expansion. Davega Stores became a principal stockholder, owning 175,000 shares. Early in his career, inventor Otis Boykin began working for the company as a laboratory assistant, eventually becoming plant foreman.

Majestic Radio & Television submitted a voluntary reorganization plan after filing for bankruptcy on October 24, 1939. The company's plan to restructure its debt had the agreement of unsecured creditors, such as suppliers of vacuum tubes. The company stressed that business was strong and day-to-day operations would not be affected. During World War II, the company performed defense work, employing noted crystallographer George Switzer to ensure that the crystal oscillators in aircraft transceivers were operating on the intended frequencies.

Following the end of World War II, the company optimistically invested $600,000 (equal to $10,479,482 today) in a new, 161,000-square-foot (15,000 m^{2}) factory on 69 acres (28 ha) in Elgin, Illinois. Majestic's product line included colorful, futuristic tabletop sets, as well as combination radio and phonograph consoles with FM tuners, beginning in 1947. The company also formed a subsidiary, Majestic Records, to produce phonograph records, beginning in 1945. Its studios were in New York City and the city's erstwhile mayor, Jimmy Walker, was named president. Although Majestic Records had some popular artists on its label, such as Bud Freeman and Louis Prima, it ceased pressing records in 1948 due to financial difficulties and its catalog was acquired by Mercury Records.

The expected postwar demand for radios did not materialize and the company was unable to develop its envisioned line of televisions, leading to the company again filing for bankruptcy in February, 1948, including its Majestic Records subsidiary. On May 27, 1949, the Federal bankruptcy court judge ordered the company's liquidation, as recommended by the trustees who concluded reorganization was not feasible. They attributed the company's failure to declining radio sales and price cutting, as well as the lack of success in television manufacturing. Pursuant to the court's order, the Elgin factory was sold at auction in November of that year, along with inventory, equipment, and goodwill.

== Wilcox-Gay final years (1950s–1960s) ==
Leonard Ashbach, whose holding company owned Garod Radio Corporation, acquired the remaining assets of Majestic Radio & Television and a controlling share of stock in the Wilcox-Gay Corporation in 1950, with the intention of manufacturing Majestic radios and televisions at Wilcox-Gay's plant in Charlotte, Michigan (near Lansing). Wilcox-Gay, a manufacturer of recording equipment, phonographs, and televisions at the time, traced its origin to 1910, when Wilcox began making transcription equipment and radio kits. One of the company's products was the "Recordio", introduced in 1939. It enabled the consumer to make home 78 rpm phonograph records, even recording off-the-air radio programs with the included AM radio. In 1948, Wilcox-Gay introduced the "Recordette", a portable version of the combination recorder, radio, and phonograph. The company also made wire recorders in the 1940s which, like phonograph home recorders, were made obsolete by the development of reel-to-reel magnetic tape recorders and discontinued in the early 1950s.

With the acquisition of Majestic Radio & TV approved by Wilcox-Gay's shareholders on August 22, 1950, manufacturing of Majestic brand radios and televisions began at the Charlotte, Michigan, factory. A line of eight Majestic radio models was offered, along with television sets. In August, 1954, Ashbach announced that Wilcox-Gay's Majestic radio and television subsidiary would begin importing Grundig FM radios from Germany as well, including an AM-FM-shortwave table model, added to the firm's Majestic product line. The Grundig radios were distributed by the existing network of Majestic dealers.

However, just five months later in January, 1955, Wilcox-Gay filed for bankruptcy and ended its money-losing television production, although radios were still manufactured. The bankrupt firm eventually closed its Michigan plant in December, 1958, ending domestic production of Majestic radios, although the firm continued to be the sole U.S. importer of Grundig products through 1961. In September, 1961, a proposed merger with Davega Stores was not consummated because Wilcox-Gay failed to meet the merger agreement's cash terms. As 1961 drew to a close in late December, Wilcox-Gay was again bankrupt and went out of business completely, with its property, equipment, and remaining inventory going on the auction block March 27–29, 1962.

== As collector's items ==
Majestic radios from the Grigsby-Grunow halcyon era of the late 1920s–early 1930s have become antique radio collector's items, prized for their craftmanship and appearance. Some models, such as the Art Deco-styled model 161 produced in 1933, have been fully restored.

== See also ==
- List of radios – List of specific models of radios
