= The Majestic Theater of the Air =

Former American musical radio program

One of 12 Eddie Cantor caricatures by Frederick J. Garner for a 1933 Brown & Bigelow advertising card set. This is the image the public had of Eddie Cantor through photos and drawings when he appeared on The Majestic Theater of the Air.

The Majestic Theater of the Air, also known as The Majestic Hour, is an American musical radio program that aired on the CBS radio network between 1928 and 1934 on Sunday evenings. The series was produced and MC'd by Wendell Hall and sponsored by Chicago's Grigsby-Grunow Company, manufacturers of Majestic Radios. It began on the CBS network in October, 1928, with a coast-to-coast hookup of 29 stations.

== Eddie Cantor, Ruth Etting, and Harriet Lee ==
When Grigsby-Grunow expanded their broadcast to reach the full CBS network on January 6, 1929, the stars of the program were Eddie Cantor and Ruth Etting. In April, 1929, singer Harriet Lee was introduced by Hall on the show as the "Chicago Nightingale", becoming a hit on the CBS network.

== Songwriter showcase ==
In an August 1929 program, Hall presented the songwriters J. Fred Coots and Benny Davis singing some of their past and present song hits. The tenor Redferne Hollinshead contributed five selections with an additional two songs by Edna Sedley.

Orchestra music was by Arnold Johnson and His Majestic Orchestra.

The series later moved to NBC.
