= Otis Boykin =

American inventor and engineer

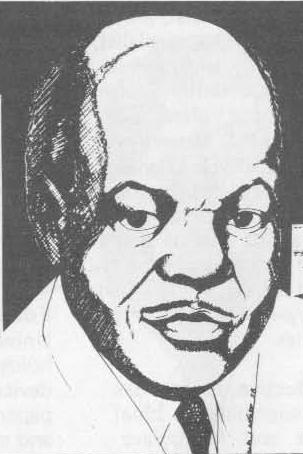
- 1979 portrait from the U.S. Department of Energy
- Born: Otis Frank Boykin; August 29, 1920; Dallas, TX
- Died: March 26, 1982 (aged 61); Chicago, Illinois
- Education: Booker T. Washington High School, FISK University
- Parent(s): Walter B. Boykin, Sarah Boykin
- Engineering career
- Institutions: Illinois Institute of Technology
- Employers: Monson Manufacturing Corporation, Chicago Telephone Supply Corporation
- Projects: Electrical resistors, electronic control devices

Otis Frank Boykin (August 29, 1920 – March 26, 1982) was an American inventor and engineer. His inventions include electrical resistors used in computing, missile guidance, and pacemakers.

== Early life ==
Otis Boykin was born on August 29, 1920, in Dallas, Texas. His father, Walter B. Boykin, was a carpenter, and later became a preacher. His mother, Sarah, was a maid, who died of heart failure when Otis was a year old. This inspired him to help improve the pacemaker.

== Education ==
Boykin attended Booker T. Washington High School in Dallas, where he was the valedictorian, graduating in 1938. He attended Fisk University on a scholarship, worked as a laboratory assistant at the university's nearby aerospace laboratory, and left in 1941.

== Career ==
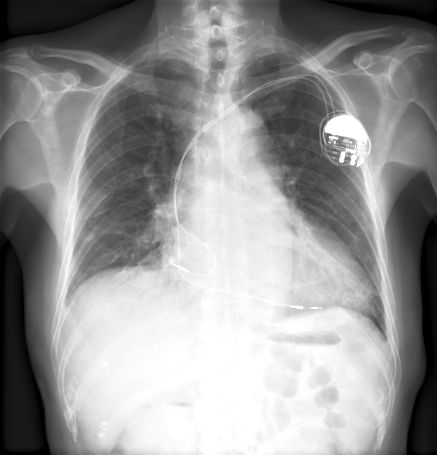
A chest x-ray of a pacemaker

After graduating, Boykin moved to Chicago where he found work as a clerk at Electro Manufacturing Company. He was subsequently hired as a laboratory assistant for the Majestic Radio and Television Corporation; at that company, he rose to become foreman of their factory. By 1944, he was working for the P.J. Nilsen Research Labs.

In 1946–1947, he studied at Illinois Institute of Technology, but dropped out after two years; some sources say it was because he could not afford his tuition, but he later stated he left for an employment opportunity and did not have time to return to finish his degree. One of his mentors was Dr. Denton Deere, an engineer and inventor with his own laboratory. Another mentor was Dr. Hal F. Fruth, with whom he collaborated on several experiments, including a more effective way to test automatic pilot control units in airplanes. The two men later went into business, opening an electronics research lab in the late 1940s.

In the 1950s, Boykin and Fruth worked together at the Monson Manufacturing Corporation; Boykin was the company's chief engineer. In the early 1960s, Boykin was a senior project engineer at the Chicago Telephone Supply Corporation, later known as CTS Labs. It was here that he did much of his pacemaker research. But Boykin subsequently sued CTS for $5 million, asserting that his former employer had obtained a patent and tried to take credit for the device that he developed.

After the suit was eventually dismissed, and his career at CTS had ended, he opened his own consulting and research company, with offices in both the US and Paris, France.

== Legacy ==
Boykin patented as many as 26 devices. He is best known for inventing multiple different electronic control devices in guided missiles, IBM computers, and in the pacemaker. One of his early inventions was an improved wire resistor, which had reduced inductance and reactance, due to the physical arrangement of the wire.

Other notable inventions include a variable resistor used in guided missiles. His most famous invention was likely a control unit for the artificial cardiac pacemaker. The device essentially uses electrical impulses to maintain a regular heartbeat. Among his other inventions is a burglar-proof cash register.

== See also ==
- List of African-American inventors and scientists
