= George Switzer (mineralogist) =

American mineralogist

George Shirley Switzer
- Born: June 11, 1915; Petaluma, California, U.S.
- Died: March 28, 2008 (aged 92); Solomons, Maryland, U.S.
- Education: University of California, Berkeley
- Scientific career
- Fields: Mineralogy
- Workplaces: Harvard University; Stanford University Department of Geology

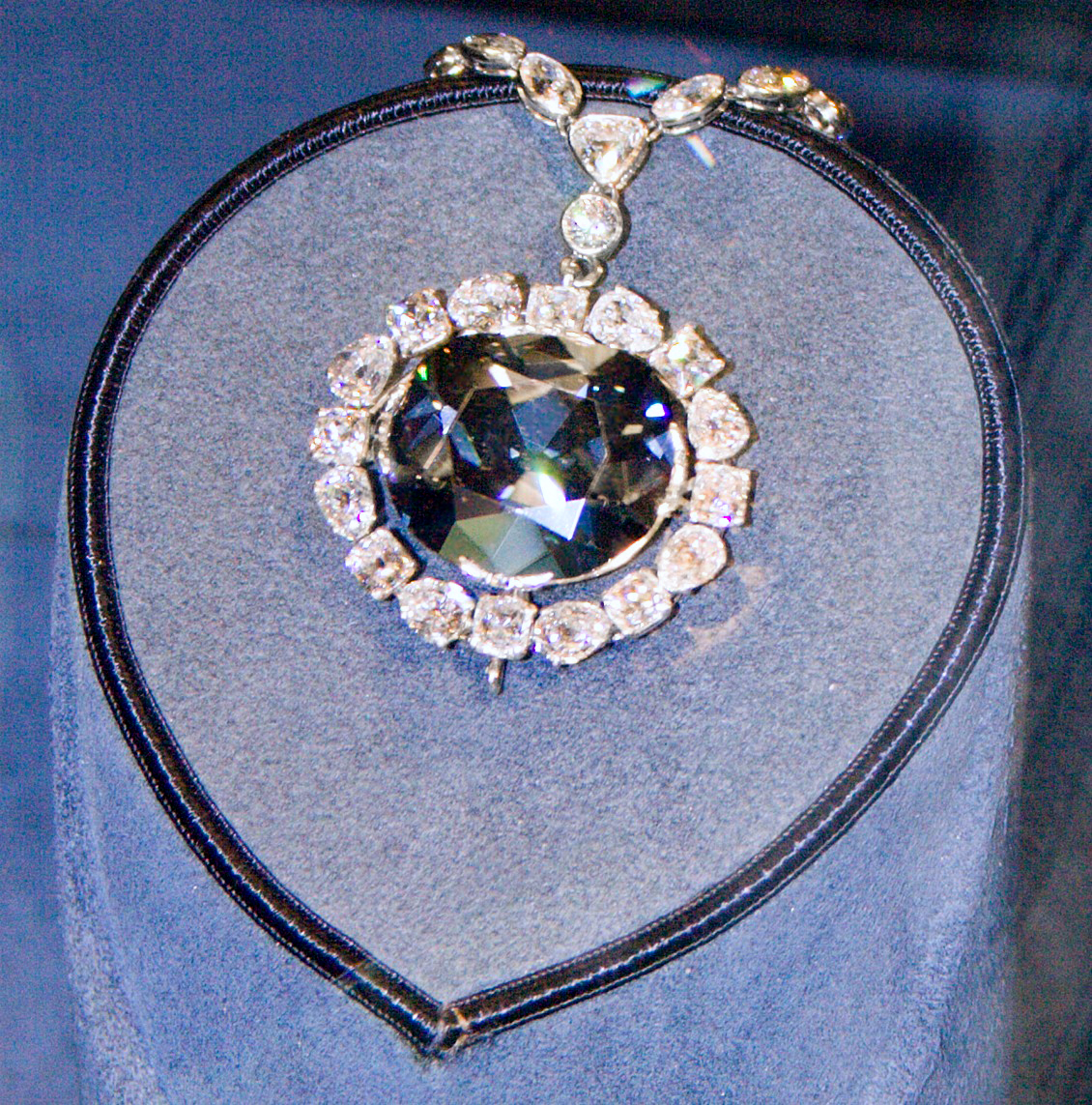
The Hope Diamond, which Switzer helped to acquire for the Smithsonian from Harry Winston in 1958

George Shirley Switzer (June 11, 1915 – March 23, 2008) was an American mineralogist who is credited with starting the Smithsonian Institution's famed National Gem and Mineral Collection by acquiring the Hope Diamond for the museum in 1958. Switzer made the arrangements when renowned New York City jeweler Harry Winston decided to donate the Hope Diamond to the Smithsonian.

Switzer was also known for his analysis of Moon rocks which were brought back by NASA missions to the Moon.

Today, the National Gem and Mineral Collection at the National Museum of Natural History currently contains more than 15,000 individual gems in the collection, as well as 350,000 minerals and 300,000 samples of rock and ore specimens. Additionally, the Smithsonian's National Gem and Mineral Collection houses approximately 35,000 meteorites, constituting what is considered to be one of the most comprehensive collections of its kind in the world.

== Early life ==
George Switzer was born in Petaluma, California on June 11, 1915. He was the son of Albert and Charlotte Ryan Switzer.

Switzer first attended Santa Rosa Junior College before earning his bachelor's degree from the University of California, Berkeley in 1937. He then obtained his master's degree in mineralogy from Harvard University in 1939. He continued at Harvard and earned his doctorate from the university in 1942.

He worked as a professor both at Stanford University from 1939 to 1940, and at Harvard University from 1940 to 1945. Switzer tried to enlist in the United States military during World War II, but a recruiter reportedly told him that his years of education could be put to better use elsewhere. So during the war, he also worked as a crystallographer for Majestic Radio & TV Corp., where he worked keeping aircraft radio frequencies up and running.

== Smithsonian ==
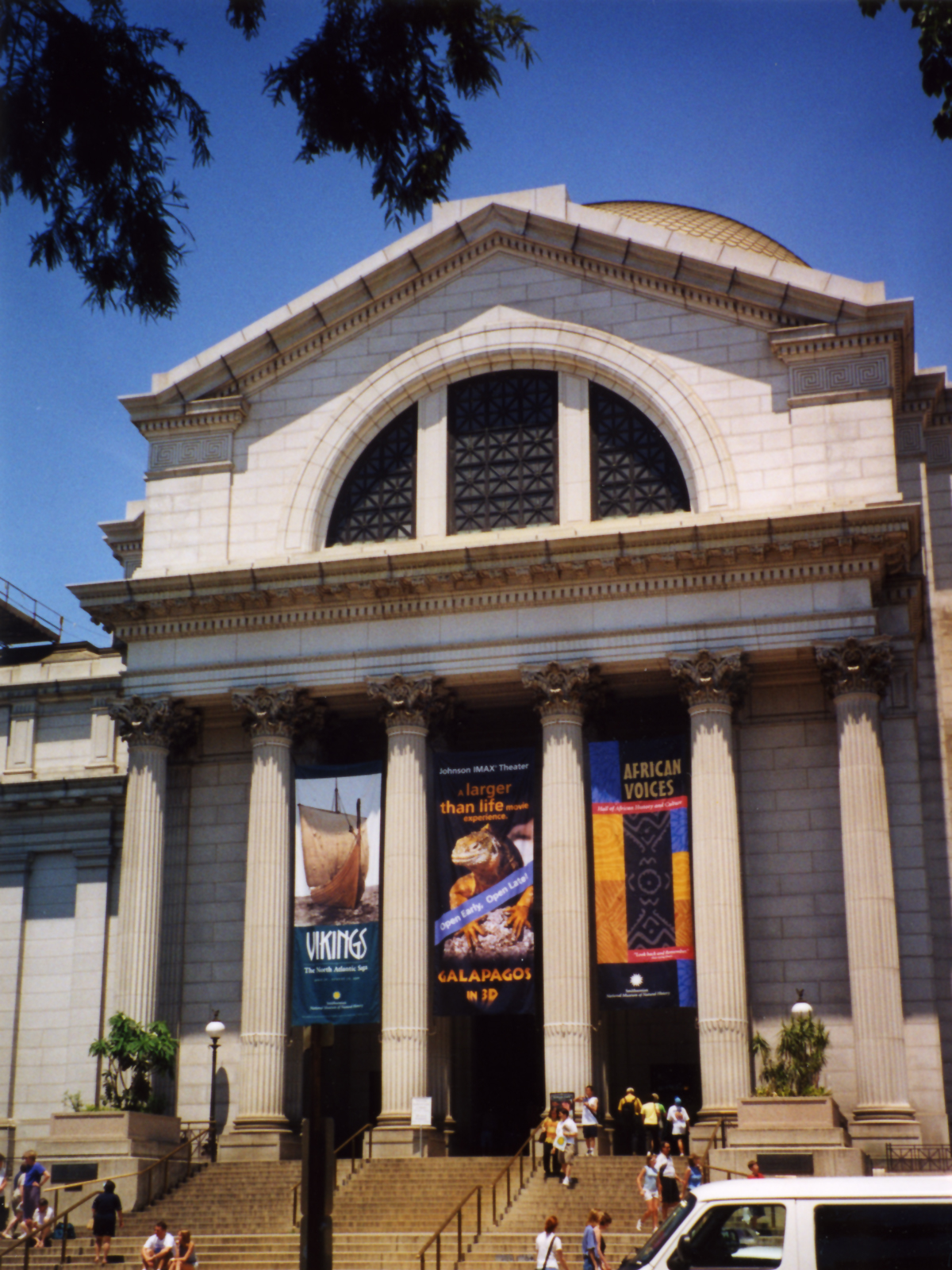
The Smithsonian National Museum of Natural History

Switzer first joined the staff of the Smithsonian's National Museum of Natural History in 1948. He initially worked as an associate curator of the museum's Division of Mineralogy and Petrology, a position which he held from 1948 until 1964. He was later promoted to Chairman of the Smithsonian's Department of Mineral Sciences from 1964 to 1969. He remained at the Smithsonian as the curator emeritus until 1975.

Switzer was a major force behind the museum's research division. He applied for and received a grant from NASA, which allowed the Smithsonian to obtain an electron probe micro-analyzer for minerals during the 1970s. The micro-analyzer allows scientists to determine the origin of a given mineral. From 1972 until 1973, Switzer and other mineralogists used the micro-analyzer to examine samples of rock from the Moon which were brought back by the crews of the Apollo 15 and Apollo 16 missions. The U.S. military had hoped to find diamonds, plutonium and uranium in the samples. Instead, Switzer's analysis showed that the Moon had never had either an atmosphere similar to Earth's or water on its surface. Switzer's research put the National Museum of Natural History at the forefront of geology.

Switzer also worked with other scientists to identify and name five minerals, which were all new to science, during his career. In his honor, three prominent mineralogists - Peter B. Leavens, John S. White and Pier F. Zanazzi - proposed naming a mineral after Switzer. The mineral in question consisted of pale brown crystals, composed of manganese phosphate, and was first discovered in North Carolina. In 1967 the International Mineralogical Association approved the name designation switzerite, in honor of George Switzer.

Switzer later served as director of research for the Gemological Institute of America and as a U.S. Geological Survey mineralogist.

=== Hope Diamond ===
Switzer, who was working as an associate curator at the time, first approached jeweler Harry Winston about donating the Hope Diamond to the Smithsonian for a proposed national gem collection to be housed at the museum. Winston had purchased the Hope Diamond, which has been nicknamed the "King of Diamonds," in 1949 from the estate of Evalyn Walsh McLean, whose father had become wealthy during the gold rushes of the 1800s.

Winston was persuaded by Switzer's argument, and agreed to his proposition. He donated the 45.52 carats (9.104 g), blue Hope Diamond to the Smithsonian in 1958. Winston mailed the Hope Diamond to the Smithsonian wrapped in brown paper. The postage to send the Hope Diamond from New York City to its new home at the Smithsonian cost $145.29. Winston's wife, Edna Winston, later more formally presented the blue diamond to Switzer and Leonard Carmichael, the secretary of the Smithsonian at the time, on November 10, 1958. The Hope Diamond was placed on display, surrounded by a pendant of 16 white diamonds on a necklace containing over 45 other white diamonds.

The acquisition of the Hope Diamond by the Smithsonian, "...started the national collection.", according to Sorena Sorensen, the current chairwoman of the Smithsonian's mineral sciences department. Sorensen also stated that, "The idea for the national collection at the Smithsonian was a collaboration between Harry Winston and George (Switzer)."

Switzer reportedly began to wonder if there was some truth to the supposed Hope Diamond curse during a trip with the Diamond to the Louvre for the "Ten Centuries of French Jewelry" exhibition in April 1962. The Smithsonian had determined that secrecy was the best defense against the potential theft of the Hope Diamond. Switzer traveled to Paris with the Hope Diamond inside a velvet pouch, which had been specially sewn by his wife, Sue. The Hope Diamond was placed inside the pouch and then pinned inside Switzer's pants pocket.

Switzer's plane, Pan American Flight 116, which was supposed to fly first from Baltimore Friendship Airport, with several refueling stops, and continuing onto Paris, made a "hard landing" in Philadelphia, which nearly tore the plane's wing off. (Please note that some reports state that the hard landing was actually made in Pittsburgh, so there is some discrepancy.) Switzer's next flight arrived in Paris nearly nine hours late on the day that the Hope Diamond was supposed to go on exhibition. Switzer's car then got into a minor fender bender while traveling from the airport to the Louvre.

== Retirement ==
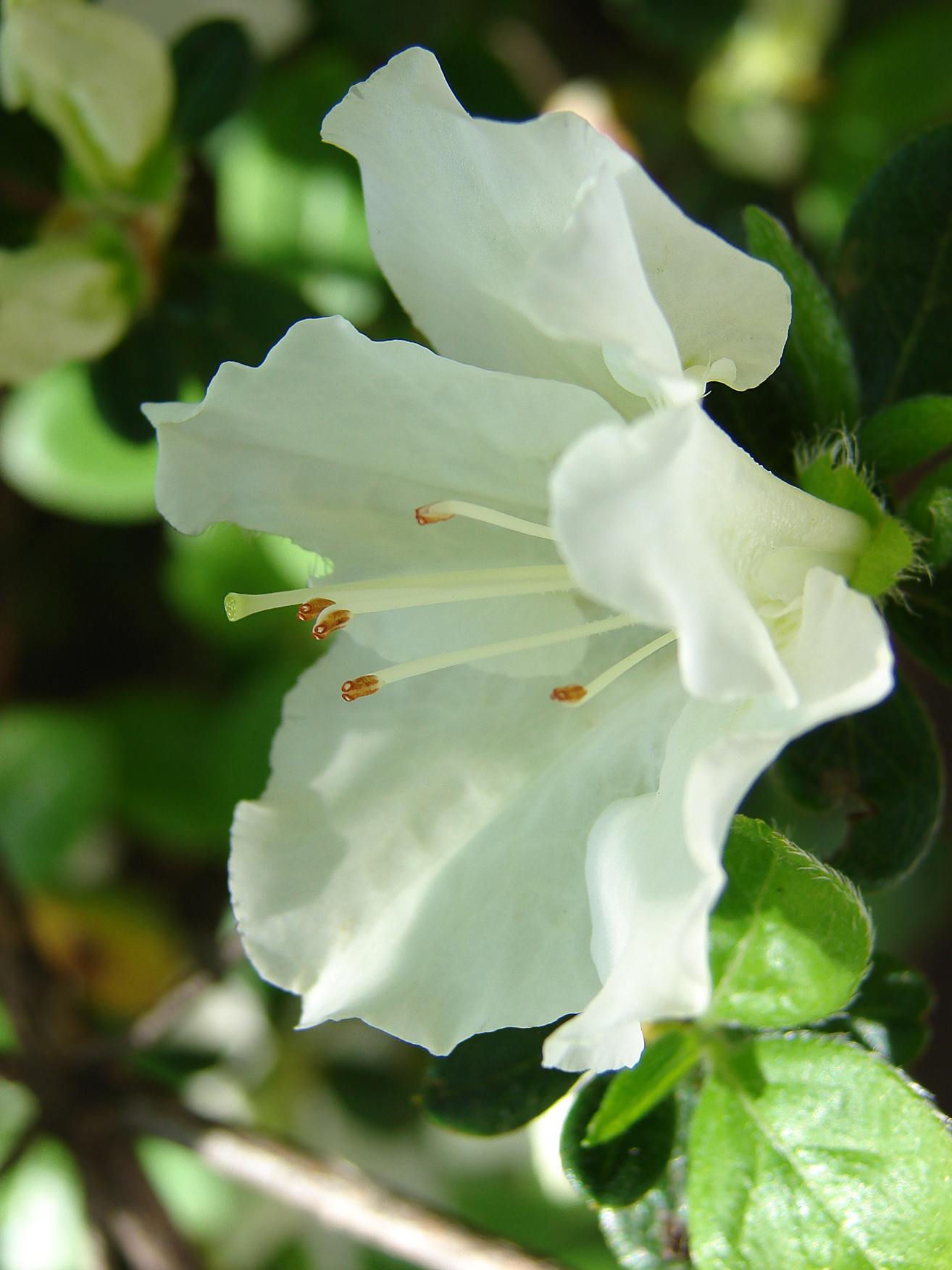
Switzer served as director of the Azalea Society of America after his retirement.

George Switzer retired from the Smithsonian in 1975 as the curator emeritus. He used his retirement to pursue his hobby, azalea propagation. His hobby became a serious occupation when he served as the director of the Azalea Society of America and became assistant editor of the Azalean publication. He was credited with describing and naming a new variety of azalea cultivar, Nannie Angell, in 1992.

Switzer authored a textbook on gemology in 1979.

== Death ==
George Switzer died in Solomons, Maryland at the Hermitage at St. John's Creek assisted living facility, at the age of 93 on March 23, 2008. The cause of his death was pneumonia. He was a resident of Port Republic, Maryland at the time, and had formerly lived in Bethesda, Maryland. Switzer was survived by his wife, Sue Joan Bowden Switzer, to whom he had been married for 68 years, as well as his two sons, eight grandchildren and twelve great-grandchildren.
