= Saturday Night with Mr. C =

Saturday Night with Mr. C.

Studio album by Perry Como
- Released: May 1958
- Recorded: February 12, 13, 19, 20 & March 5, 6, 11, 12, 1958
- Genre: Vocal
- Length: 49:00
- Label: RCA Victor
- Producer: Joe Reisman

Perry Como chronology
We Get Letters (1957)	Saturday Night with Mr. C. (1958)	When You Come to the End of the Day (1958)

Saturday Night with Mr. C. was Perry Como's third RCA Victor 12" long-play album, and his first recorded in stereophonic sound.

== Overview ==
The album is structured as an extended version of the request section of his popular television show, beginning and ending with his theme songs "Dream Along with Me" and "You Are Never Far Away" and with his TV request theme, "We Get Letters" used twice in the album as an intro. At the time, Perry was seen on NBC's Saturday night schedule at 8 P.M. Eastern Time.

All stereo pressings of Saturday Night With Mr. C. excluded the track "Come Rain or Come Shine", despite that song having its title clearly printed on the jacket. It is assumed that this cut had something to do with space limitations within the new stereo LP format; with a playing time of nearly 50 minutes, the album was nearly twice as long as the typical pop LP of the period. "Come Rain or Come Shine" was reissued in 1967 on the RCA Camden compilation Hello, Young Lovers, but the stereo version on that album was electronically reprocessed ("fake stereo") from monophonic. In 2001, Saturday Night with Mr.C was reissued on compact disc by the Collectables Records third-party reissue label, by arrangement with RCA Records; this reissue included the first release of "Come Rain or Come Shine" in true stereo.

Since Como's television show ran on Thursday evenings in Australia, the title for the Australian pressing of this album is Thursday Night With Mr. Como.

Como is accompanied by the Mitchell Ayres orchestra and the Ray Charles Singers, with arrangements by Joe Lipman.

== Reception ==
Professional ratings
Review scores
Source	Rating
Allmusic	4/5 stars
The Encyclopedia of Popular Music	3/5 stars

The initial review by the Canadian Music World magazine stated that "There is something in this album to please all Como fans, and for others I recommend it as one of the best and least harmful of all the tranquilizers." The publication noted that "With the aid of the Mitchell Ayres Orchestra, and the fabulous Ray Charles Singers, Perry Como sings in the smooth, relaxed fashion he has made his very own. Don't be misled into thinking that it is only a soporific; it is a very entertaining disk, and even introduces a medley "Letters", as on the TV show, plus many old and new numbers we all want to hear again."

The retrospective by William Ruhlmann of AllMusic said that "Jack Andrews and Joe Lipman divided up the arranging chores, regularly coming up with gimmicky, ear-catching orchestrations that made a contrast with Como's sonorous, slightly nasal baritone, which bore through each song agreeably, rendering them all equal. The Encyclopedia of Popular Music gave the album a three-star rating as well.

== Chart performance ==
The album debuted on the US Billboard Best-Selling Pop LP's chart in the issue dated June 16, 1958, peaking at No. 18 during a two-week run on it. On the Cash Box Best-Selling Pop Albums chart it was ranked higher at No. 16. In the United Kingdom, the album was called Dear Perry and spent five weeks in the top ten of the Melody Maker album chart, entering on November 8, 1958 and peaking at number six, one of his most successful entries on the chart.

== Track listing ==
Side one
No.	Title	Lyrics	Music	Length
1.	"Opening Theme: Dream Along With Me Time / Accentuate the Positive"	Carl Sigman / Johnny Mercer	Carl Sigman / Harold Arlen	2:55
2.	"It Could Happen to You"	Johnny Burke	Jimmy Van Heusen	2:46
3.	"Love Letters"	Edward Heyman	Victor Young	1:59
4.	"Almost Like Being in Love / Little Man, You've Had a Busy Day / The Gypsy in My Soul / The Whiffenpoof Song"	Alan Jay Lerner / Maurice Sigler / Al Hoffman / Moe Jaffe / Meade Minnigerode / George S. Pomeroy	Frederick Loewe / Mabel Wayne / Clay Boland / Tod B. Galloway	9:12
5.	"Between the Devil and the Deep Blue Sea"	Ted Koehler	Harold Arlen	2:22
6.	"Red Sails in the Sunset"	Jimmy Kennedy	Hugh Williams (Will Grosz)	3:06

Side two
No.	Title	Lyrics	Music	Length
7.	"The Birth of the Blues"	B.G. DeSylva / Lew Brown	Ray Henderson	3:25
8.	"When I Fall in Love"	Edward Heyman	Victor Young	2:59
9.	"Come Rain or Come Shine"	Johnny Mercer	Harold Arlen	3:20
10.	"You Made Me Love You / I May Be Wrong / Like Someone in Love / Vaya Con Dios"	Joseph McCarthy / Harry Ruskin / Johnny Burke / Inez James	James V. Monaco / Harry Sullivan / Jimmy Van Heusen / Larry Russell / Buddy Pepper	10:07
11.	"It Had to Be You"	Gus Kahn	Isham Jones	2:35
12.	"Twilight on the Trail / Closing Theme: You Are Never Far Away Time"	Sidney D. Mitchell / Allan Roberts	Louis Alter / Robert Allen	3:01
Total length:				49:00

== Charts ==
Chart performance for Saturday Night with Mr. C
Chart (1958)	Peak position
US Billboard Best Selling Pop LP's	18
US Cash Box Best Selling Pop Albums	16
UK Melody Maker Top LP's	6
