= Midway Gardens =

Entertainment venue in Chicago (1914–1929)

Coordinates: 41°47′07″N 87°36′24″W

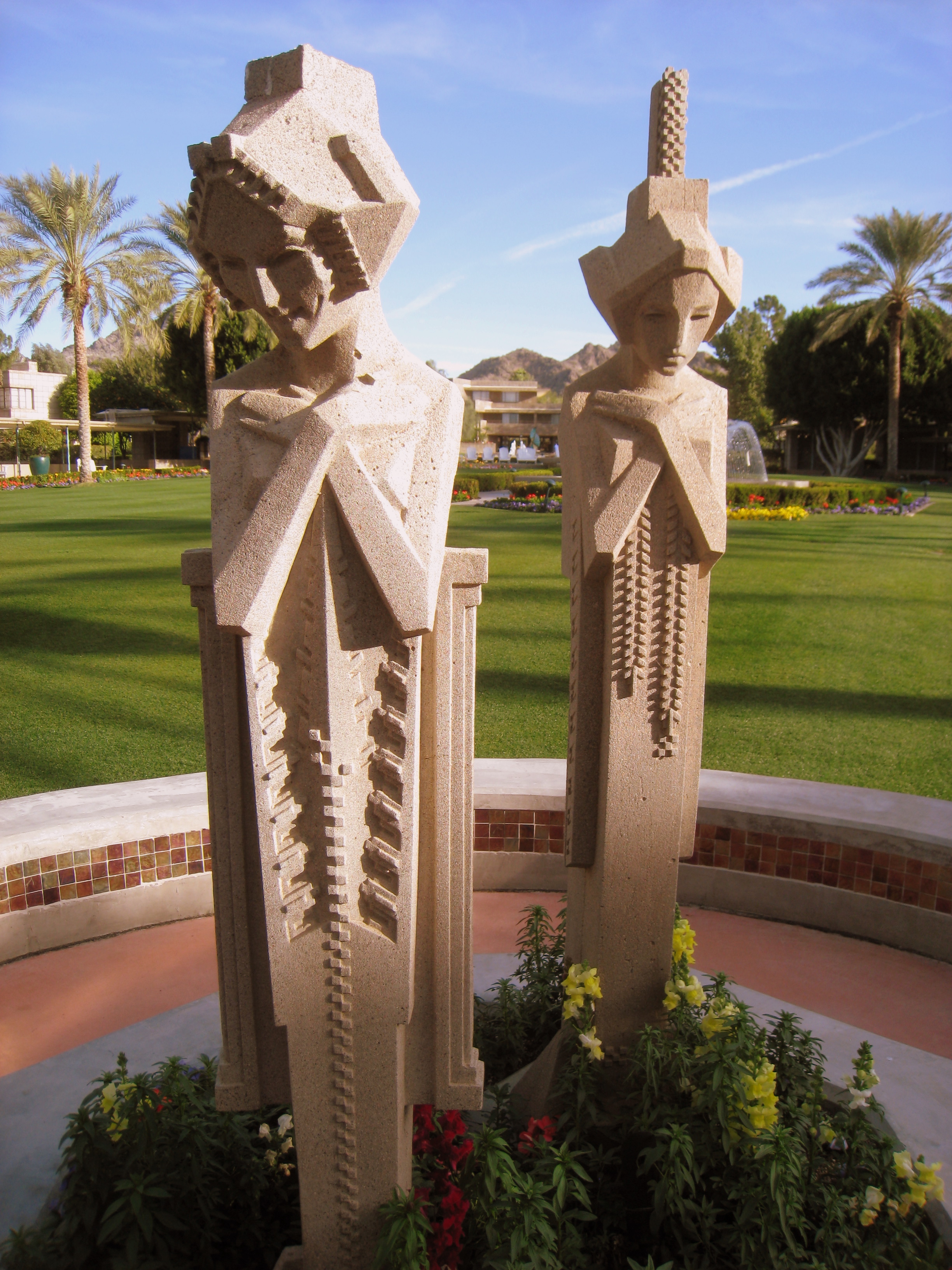
Reproductions of the Wright-designed Midway Gardens sprites were later added to the Arizona Biltmore Hotel

Midway Gardens (opened in 1914, demolished in 1929) was a 360,000 square feet indoor/outdoor entertainment facility in the Hyde Park neighborhood on the South Side of Chicago. It was designed by architect Frank Lloyd Wright, who also collaborated with sculptors Richard Bock and Alfonso Iannelli on the famous "sprite" sculptures decorating the facility. Designed to be a European–style concert garden with space for year-round dining, drinking, and performances, Midway Gardens hosted popular performers and entertainers but struggled financially and the structure was torn down in October 1929.

== History ==
Midway Gardens was opened on the site of the former Sans Souci amusement park on the southwest corner of Cottage Grove Avenue and East 60th Street. Edward C. Waller Jr. commissioned Frank Lloyd Wright to design and build the Gardens in 1914 (Waller's father, Edward Waller Sr., had commissioned an apartment building from Wright, the Waller Apartments). Construction was completed very quickly, and the Gardens opened in June 1914.

Although at first business was strong, Waller never had enough funds to back the construction and upkeep of Midway Gardens and declared bankruptcy in March 1916. At this point, Midway Gardens was purchased by the Schoenhofen Brewing Company and renamed "Edelweiss Gardens" (after the brewery's main beer brand). Wright, who generally exerted strong creative control over his completed projects, was disgusted by the aesthetic changes the new owner made to the Gardens. He wrote that Edelweiss had added "obnoxious features" and that the whole effect of "the proud Midway Gardens" "was cheapened to suit a hearty bourgeois taste". Edelweiss Gardens continued through the war years (closing briefly in 1918) and stayed open as a dry establishment during Prohibition. In 1921, the building was sold once more, to the E. C. Dietrich Midway Automobile Tire and Supply Company, and renamed "The Midway Dancing Gardens".

Finally, in October 1929, Midway Gardens was closed permanently and demolished. A testament to Wright's design, the building was so solidly constructed that tearing it down sent the wrecking company into bankruptcy.

== Features and entertainment ==
Midway Gardens was an indoor/outdoor entertainment center intended to act as a beer hall and concert/dance hall which featured bands including the Midway Gardens Orchestra. The large area (equivalent to a city block) offered entertainment to a wide variety of people in a German-style meeting place. The Gardens included restaurants, saloons, newspaper and cigar stands, and arcades. When Prohibition was passed, the Gardens lost part of their entertainment value.

When it opened, Midway Gardens was an upscale entertainment venue that was also affordable to the common person. Max Bendix and the National Symphony Orchestra frequented the concert section because they were the "house band". The ballet dancer Anna Pavlova performed numerous times as well. Frank Lloyd Wright brought in popular acts to sing, dance, and play music, which created a bourgeois environment. After it became Edelweiss Gardens, however, the high class atmosphere switched to one of vaudeville, ragtime, and cabaret. In the early 1920s, a young clarinetist Benny Goodman played in the house band.

== Design ==
The modernist architecture of the Gardens was based on strict geometrical forms. A large, open–air central area, filled with tables and chairs, was ringed by a series of three–story buildings with indoor spaces for dancing and other activities, as well as cantilevered balconies with overhanging roofs. There were terraced gardens, pools, and a music pavilion and stage.

The building itself was made of yellow brick and patterned concrete block. It featured highly intricate ornament and many geometric sculptures, which Frank Lloyd Wright named "sprites" and were co-designed with Alfonso Ianelli. Some of these sculptures escaped demolition and can be found elsewhere. In keeping with Wright's style, the building also featured rows of art glass and hidden entries. The interior was likewise intricately ornamented and filled with Wright-designed furniture and accoutrements, right down to the napkin rings.

== See also ==
- List of Frank Lloyd Wright works
