= Washboard Blues =

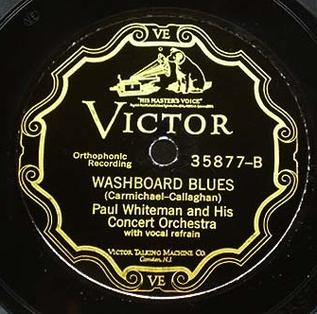
- 1927 recording by Paul Whiteman and His Concert Orchestra.

Single by Paul Whiteman and his Concert Orchestra, vocal refrain by Hoagy Carmichael
- A-side: "Among My Souvenirs"
- Written: 1926
- Published: May 28, 1925 Jack Mills, Inc.
- Released: February 1928
- Recorded: November 18, 1927
- Studio: Victor Studios, 952 N. Michigan Ave., Chicago, Illinois
- Genre: Blues
- Label: Victor 35877
- Composer: Hoagy Carmichael
- Lyricists: Fred B. Callahan, Irving Mills

"Washboard Blues" is a popular jazz song written by Hoagy Carmichael, Fred B. Callahan and Irving Mills. It was first recorded for Gennett Records in May, 1925 by Hitch's Happy Harmonists with Carmichael on piano. It was subsequently recorded by jazz bands Original Memphis Five (1925) and Red Nichols and his Five Pennies (1926).

On November 18, 1927, it was recorded in Chicago by Paul Whiteman and his Concert Orchestra, featuring piano and lead vocals by Carmichael, and was released as Victor 35877-B (the B-side of "Among My Souvenirs")

The song is an evocative washerwoman's lament. Though the verse, chorus, and bridge pattern is present, the effect of the song is of one long, cohesive melodic line with a dramatic shifting of tempo. The cohesiveness of the long melody perfectly matches the lyrical description of the crushing fatigue resulting from the repetitious work of washing clothes under primitive conditions.

== Credits ==
A copy of the lyrics from the Indiana University archives of the Hoagy Carmichael collection credits F. B. Callahan with the words to "Washboard Blues".
