= Riverboat Shuffle =

Popular song first recorded in 1924

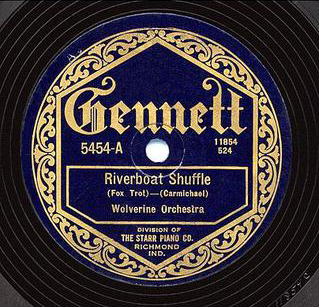

Song by Bix Beiderbecke and Wolverine Orchestra
- Recorded: May 6, 1924
- Genre: Dixieland Jazz
- Label: Gennett 5454
- Composer(s): Hoagy Carmichael, Irving Mills, and Dick Voynow

Audio sample
- Recording of Riverboat Shuffle, performed by Bix Beiderbecke & Wolverine Orchestra (1924): file; help

"Riverboat Shuffle" is a popular song composed by Hoagy Carmichael, Irving Mills, and Dick Voynow. Lyrics were later added by Carmichael and Mitchell Parish.

First recorded by Bix Beiderbecke and The Wolverines in 1924, the piece was Carmichael's first composition and it would become a Dixieland standard. Carmichael would go on to write many popular jazz standards, including "Stardust" (1927), "Georgia on My Mind" (1930), and "Lazy River" (1931). Beiderbecke and the Wolverines released the song as a Gennett 78 record (5454-A, Matrix #11854 524). Beiderbecke also recorded a second version of the song in 1927 with Frankie Trumbauer and His Orchestra, which was released as an Okeh Records 78 (40822).

== Renditions ==
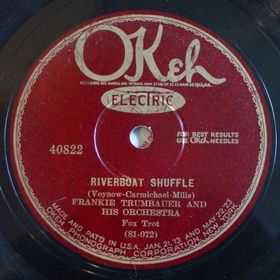
1927 Okeh 78, 40822, by Frankie Trumbauer and His Orchestra featuring Bix Beiderbecke.

- Benson Orchestra of Chicago (1925), 32715-4 VICTOR 19688B
- Richard Hitter's Cabineers (1925), SAH4 CLOVER EBS1063
- Jimmy Joy's St. Anthony's Hotel Orchestra featuring Jimmy Maloney (1925), 9108-A OKEH 40388
- Red Nichols and His Five Pennies (1927), E24225 BRUNSWICK 6820 (re-recorded and released in 1950 by Capitol Records)
- Frankie Trumbauer and His Orchestra featuring Bix Beiderbecke (1927), OKEH 40822
- The Cotton Club Orchestra, COLUMBIA 374-D
- Adrian Rollini and His Orchestra (1934), 38878 DECCA 265B
- Glen Gray and the Casa Loma Orchestra (1939), 64962-A DECCA 2398B
- Muggsy Spanier Ragtime Band (1939), 043894-2 BLUEBIRD 10532
- Sidney Bechet with Claude Luter (1949), BLUENOTE BN568
- Muggsy Spanier and His Ragtime Band, V-DISC 307B1
- Tex Beneke and His Orchestra
- Acker Bilk
- Billy May and His Orchestra
- Eddie Condon
- George Brunies and His Jazz Band
- The Dukes of Dixieland
- Matty Matlock
- Wild Bill Davison
- Jack Teagarden and His Jazz Band
- Ray Bauduc-Nappy Lamare and Their Dixieland Band

== See also ==
- List of 1920s jazz standards
