= Switzerite =

Phosphate mineral

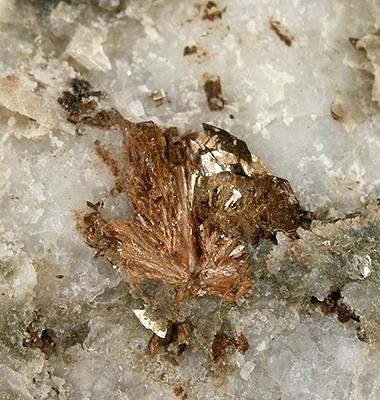
- Switzerite (metaswitzerite) from Foote Lithium County Mine, Kings Mountain District, Cleveland County, North Carolina, US

General
- Category: Phosphate minerals
- Formula: (Mn,Fe)_{3}(PO_{4})_{2}·7H_{2}O
- Strunz classification: 8.CE.25
- Crystal system: Monoclinic
- Crystal class: Prismatic (2/m) (same H-M symbol)
- Space group: P2_{1}/a
- Unit cell: a = 8.528 Å b = 13.166 Å c = 11.812 Å; β = 110.05° Z = 4; V = 1,245.87 Å^{3}

Identification
- Formula mass: 481.55 g/mol
- Color: Pale pink, Pinkish brown
- Cleavage: Perfect (001) Cleavage
- Mohs scale hardness: 2
- Luster: Pearly
- Streak: White
- Diaphaneity: Transparent to Translucent
- Density: 2.535
- Optical properties: Biaxial (-)

Switzerite is a mineral with the chemical formula of (Mn)_{3}(PO_{4})_{2}·7H_{2}O. The mineral was named after George Switzer, former Curator of Minerals at the US National Museum. The mineral is monoclinic prismatic, meaning that it has one mirror plane, one 2-fold rotation axis which is perpendicular to the mirror plane and a center of symmetry. Switzerite is a part of the monoclinic space group P 2_{1}/a. For its optical properties, Switzerite is classified as anisotropic, has a low surface relief and birefringence of δ = 0.020.

Switzerite was first discovered in the 1960s and is a relatively uncommon mineral found in a few localities in Europe, North America, and Australia. This mineral is found in phosphate mines, along with other phosphate minerals. Alone, Switzerite does not have a huge significance due to its rarity and extremely small size. This mineral is found with other phosphate minerals thus, the importance of Switzerite is that it is used, along with the other phosphate minerals, for agricultural purposes. It is unstable and immediately dehydrates into metaswitzerite on exposure to the atmosphere.
