= Dudley Mecum =

Dudley Mecum (1896–1978) was an American pianist, vocalist and songwriter., He was based in Chicago and had a musical group, Dudley Mecum's Wolverines. In the 1920s, he also performed with a number of other ensembles such as Merritt Brunies and his Friar's Inn Orchestra. Mecum wrote the lyrics for the song "Angry" which was composed by Merritt Brunies, Henry Brunies, and Jules Cassard in 1925. By 1929 Mecum had become a full-time songwriter. His other published pieces included "How's Your Folks and My Folks", recorded by the pianist and vocalist Art Gillham while testing new electric microphone technology, "I've Got the Blues for Tennessee", co-written by Mecum with Cal DeVoll and Wallace Bradley.

Mecum also performed as vocalist on the popular recording of the tune "42nd Street" by the Don Bestor orchestra in 1933.
