= Midway Gardens Orchestra =

Jazz group

The Midway Gardens Orchestra was a jazz group active in the Chicago area of the United States during 1923. The band was led by Elmer Schoebel and played at Chicago's Midway Gardens. The group recorded under various names, and as a result their recordings are difficult to find.

The group's members included banjoist Lou Black.

== Discography ==
Selected recordings include:

- As the Original Memphis Melody Boys: There's No Gal Like My Gal, 1923, Gennett
- As the Original Memphis Melody Boys: Blue Grass Blues, 1923, Gennett
- As the Chicago Blues Dance Orchestra: House of David Blues, 1923, Columbia
