= Arnold Johnson (musician) =

American big band pianist, arranger, composer and leader (1893–1975)

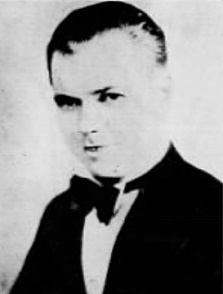
Johnson in 1929

Arnold Johnson (March 23, 1893 – July 15, 1975) was an American big band pianist, arranger, composer, and leader during the swing jazz era. He was orchester leader on the popular The Majestic Theater of the Air program on the CBS radio network beginning in 1929.

Born in Chicago, Johnson worked in a Chinese restaurant in Chicago as a pianist when he was fourteen years old, and also worked as an accompanist for vaudeville revues. He studied at the Chicago College of Music and the American Conservatory of Music. He took a job as a pianist in Rudy Wiedoeft's New York-based Frisco Jass Band in the early 1920s, and also worked briefly in real estate around this time. He formed his own band in the middle of the 1920s, which recorded for Brunswick Records and Vocalion Records; Freddy Martin and Harold Arlen were sidemen in the group. Later, Vic Berton, Bob Chester, and Danny Polo would join the band, which played in the Broadway musicals George White Scandals, Greenwich Village Follies, and Earl Carroll's Sketchbook in 1928–1929. The group performed frequently in dance halls in New York and Chicago.

Johnson disbanded the group in the early 1930s, and became involved in the broadcasting business, working as a director and producer of radio programs such as National Amateur Night. He died in St. Petersburg, Florida.
