= Dick Voynow =

American jazz pianist and composer (c. 1900–1944)

Richard F. "Dick" Voynow (c. 1900 – September 15, 1944) was a jazz pianist and composer. He was a member and leader of The Wolverines.

== Life and career ==
Voynow replaced Dud Mecum on piano in The Wolverines during the band's booking at the Stockton Club in Ohio. He eventually became the band's business manager and leader. He remained relatively unknown, in part because The Wolverines featured one of the most famous of jazz musicians – Bix Beiderbecke. Voynow is also known as co-composer of "Riverboat Shuffle".

He worked as a recording manager from the late 1920s for companies including the combined Brunswick and Decca labels. In the 1940s he was a recording executive in California. He died in Los Angeles on September 15, 1944, after a long illness.
