= The Wolverines (jazz band) =

American jazz band

- Origin: Hamilton, Ohio, U.S.
- Genres: Jazz, big band
- Years active: 1923–1931
- Labels: Gennett, Claxtonola
- Past members: Al Gande; Bix Beiderbecke; Bob Gillette; Dick Voynow; Dudley Mecum; George Johnson; Jimmy Hartwell; Jimmy McPartland; Min Leibrook; Rosy McHargue; Turk Savage; Vic Berton; Vic Moore

The Wolverines (also Wolverine Orchestra, Wolverines Orchestra, The Original Wolverines) were an American jazz band. They were one of the most successful territory bands of the American Midwest in the 1920s.

== History ==
The Wolverine Orchestra first played at the Stockton Club, a nightclub south of Hamilton, Ohio, in September 1923. Many of its players were transplanted Chicago musicians, and it was led by pianist Dudley Mecum. Cornetist Bix Beiderbecke joined the group toward the end of the year after the lead cornetist left. Mecum named the group based on the fact that they so often performed the Jelly Roll Morton tune, "Wolverine Blues". He quit at the end of 1923 and was replaced by Dick Voynow, from St. Louis.

When the Stockton Club closed after a New Year's Eve brawl, the group moved to Cincinnati to play at Doyle's Dance Studio. They did a three-month stay there and became one of the city's most popular attractions, and on February 18, 1924, they recorded for the first time at Gennett Records. These were the first recordings Beiderbecke ever played on. Hoagy Carmichael was in the Gennett studio when the Wolverines recorded his tune, "Free Wheeling", on May 6, 1924. It was Beiderbecke's idea to rename it "Riverboat Shuffle". The recording was released as a Gennett 78, 5454-A.

As a live act, they were so popular that the owner of Doyle's locked their instruments in his club to keep them from skipping town, but the group eventually sneaked out in order to take a job in Bloomington, Indiana. When they reached Bloomington, they found their gig had been cancelled. Instead, Bernie Cummins began booking gigs for them at colleges in Ohio and Indiana; they became a popular attraction at Indiana University, and recorded again in May and June 1924. Vic Berton replaced Vic Moore on drums just before their June recording date. Berton's tenure did not last long, and Moore returned to the band before the end of the year.

In September 1924, they booked dates at the Roseland Ballroom in New York City, and recorded for Gennett again in New York in September and October. After finding out that the Roseland engagement was to be cancelled in November, Beiderbecke left the group to play with Jean Goldkette. Jimmy McPartland eventually replaced him, and they recorded yet again for Gennett in December, before taking off for a gig in Palm Beach, Florida.

After 1925, the group's history is less well documented, since the intense interest in the group centers mainly on Beiderbecke's tenure. Voynow sold the rights to the name "Wolverine Orchestra" to a promoter named Husk O'Hare, who began booking several different ensembles under that name through the end of the decade. One of the bands remained popular in the Midwest and played for radio station WLW, though they only recorded once for Vocalion in 1928.

O'Hare's Wolverines disbanded in 1931, and Al Gande, the original group's trombonist, began touring as the New Wolverine Orchestra in 1936. He remained at the helm of this ensemble until his death in a car crash in 1946. Since then many jazz revival groups have performed under the name "Wolverines".

== Members ==
- Cecil Downs - director
- Dudley Mecum - piano
- Dick Voynow - piano
- Jimmy Hartwell - clarinet
- Turk Savage - clarinet
- Rosy McHargue - clarinet
- Bix Beiderbecke - cornet
- Jimmy McPartland - trumpet
- Min Leibrook - tuba
- Bob Gillette - banjo
- Al Gande - trombone
- George Johnson - tenor saxophone
- Vic Moore - drums
- Vic Berton - drums

== Major recordings ==
- "Fidgety Feet"/"Jazz Me Blues," recorded on February 18, 1924, in Richmond, Indiana, and released as Gennett 5408
- "Oh Baby"/"Copenhagen," recorded on May 6, 1924, and released as Gennett 5453 and Claxtonola 40336
- "Riverboat Shuffle"/"Susie," recorded on May 6, 1924, and released as Gennett 5454
- "I Need Some Pettin'"/"Royal Garden Blues", recorded on June 20, 1924 in Richmond, Indiana and released as Gennett 20062
- "Tiger Rag", recorded on June 20, 1924 in Richmond, Indiana, unissued test pressing. It was released in 1936 by English Brunswick as 02205-B and as Hot Record Society 24
- "Sensation"/"Lazy Daddy," recorded on September 16, 1924 and released as Gennett 5542
- "Tia Juana"/"Big Boy", recorded on October 7, 1924 in New York and released as Gennett
