= Red Nichols =

American jazz cornetist, composer, and bandleader (1905–1965)

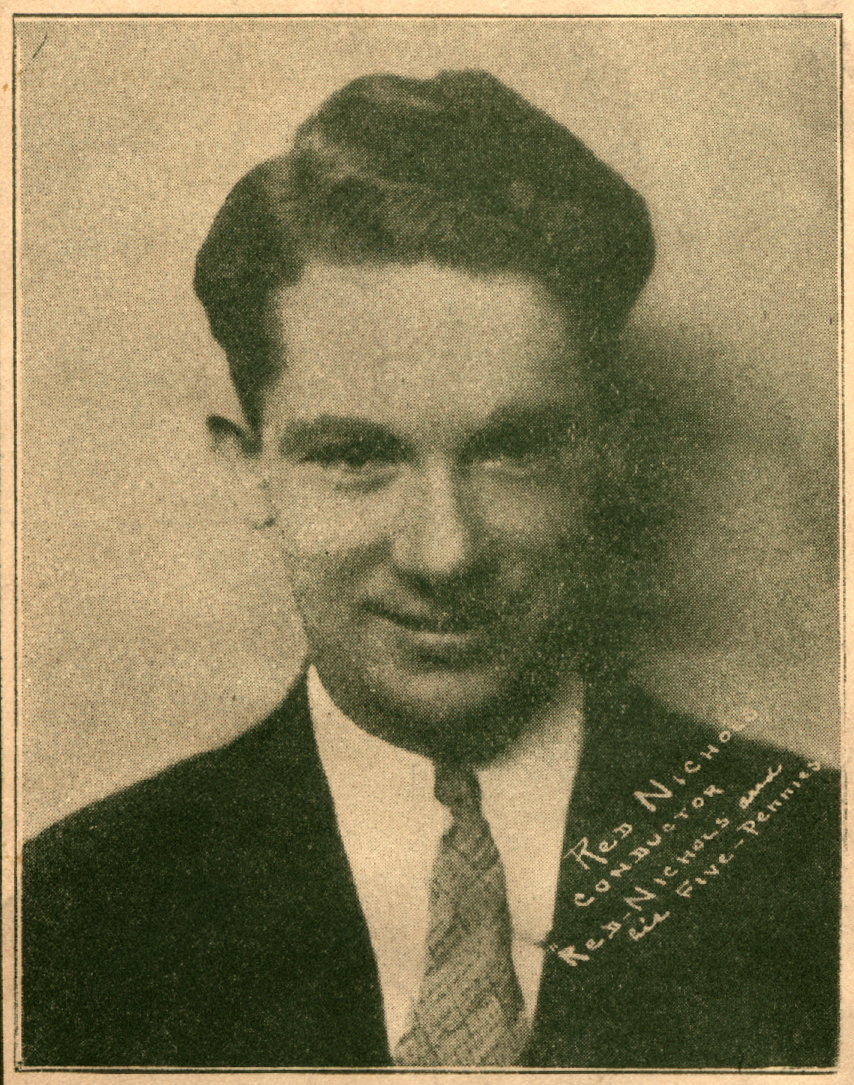

Background information
- Born: Ernest Loring Nichols; May 8, 1905; Ogden, Utah, U.S.
- Died: June 28, 1965 (aged 60) Las Vegas, Nevada, U.S.
- Genre: Jazz
- Occupations: Musician, bandleader, composer
- Instrument: Cornet
- Formerly of: Red Nichols and His Five Pennies

Ernest Loring "Red" Nichols (May 8, 1905 – June 28, 1965) was an American jazz cornetist, composer, and bandleader. He was one of the most prolific and influential jazz musicians in the late 1920s and early '30s, appearing on over 4,000 recordings. A biopic was made of his life and career, The Five Pennies (1959), starring Danny Kaye.

== Biography ==
=== Early life and career ===
Nichols was born in Ogden, Utah, United States. He was of the Mormon faith. His father was a college music professor, and Nichols was something of a child prodigy, playing difficult set pieces for his father's brass band by the age of 12. Young Nichols heard the early recordings of the Original Dixieland Jazz Band and later those of Bix Beiderbecke, and these had a strong influence on him. His style became polished, clean, and incisive.

In the early 1920s, Nichols moved to the Midwest and joined a band called the Syncopating Seven. When that band broke up, he joined the Johnny Johnson Orchestra and went with it to New York City in 1923. In New York, he met trombonist Miff Mole, and the two were inseparable for the next decade. Before signing with Brunswick, Nichols and Mole recorded for Pathé-Perfect under the name the Red Heads.

=== Brunswick Records era ===
Nichols could read music and easily gained studio work. In 1926, Mole and he began recording with a variety of bands as Red Nichols and His Five Pennies. Few of these groups were quintets; the name was a pun on "nickel".

With the Five Pennies, he recorded more than 100 sides for Brunswick. He also recorded as the Arkansas Travelers, the California Red Heads, the Louisiana Rhythm Kings, the Charleston Chasers, Red and Miff's Stompers, and Miff Mole and His Little Molers. During some weeks in this period, Nichols and his bands were recording 10 to 12 two-sided records.

Nichols' band started with Mole on trombone and Jimmy Dorsey on alto saxophone and clarinet. Other musicians in his bands in the following decade included Benny Goodman (clarinet), Glenn Miller (trombone), Jack Teagarden (trombone), Pee Wee Russell (clarinet), Joe Venuti (violin), Eddie Lang (banjo and guitar), and Gene Krupa (drums). The Five Pennies' version of "Ida, Sweet as Apple Cider" was a surprise hit record. It sold over a million copies and was awarded a gold disc by the Recording Industry Association of America. His composition "Nervous Charlie Stomp" was recorded by one of the top jazz bands of the 1920s, Fletcher Henderson's orchestra featuring Coleman Hawkins on sax, and released as a 78 single.

In the next decade, more structured swing eclipsed the improvisational hot jazz Nichols loved to play. He tried to follow the changes and formed a swing band, but his recording career seemed to stall in 1932. Music critic Michael Brooks wrote,

What went wrong? Part of it was too much, too soon. Much of his vast recorded output was released in Europe, where he was regarded by early jazz critics as the equal, if not the superior, of Louis Armstrong and Bix Beiderbecke. People who make fools of themselves usually find a scapegoat, and when the critics were exposed to the music of Duke Ellington, Benny Carter, Coleman Hawkins, and others, they turned on Nichols and savaged him, trashing him as unfairly as they had revered him. Nichols' chief fault was an overly stiff, academic approach to jazz trumpet, but he did recognize merit as far as other jazz musicians were concerned and made some wonderful small-group recordings.

Other labels for which Nichols recorded included Edison 1926, Victor 1927, 1928, 1930, 1931 (individual sessions), Bluebird 1934, 1939, back to Brunswick for a session in 1934, Variety 1937, and OKeh in 1940.

=== Later career ===
Nichols survived the Great Depression by playing in show bands and pit orchestras. He led Bob Hope's orchestra for a while, moving to California. Nichols married Willa Stutsman, a "stunning" George White's Scandals dancer, and they had a daughter. In 1942, their daughter contracted polio, which was misdiagnosed at first as spinal meningitis, and Nichols left Glen Gray and the Casa Loma Orchestra to work in the wartime shipyards. On May 2, 1942, Nichols left his band to take an army commission after completing an engagement at Lantz's Merry-Go-Round in Dayton, Ohio.

Drawn back to music after the war, Nichols formed another Five Pennies band and began playing in small clubs in Los Angeles. Club dates turned into performances at bigger venues, such as the Zebra Room, the Tudor Room of the Palace Hotel in San Francisco, and the Huntington-Sheraton Hotel in Pasadena, California. He toured Europe as a goodwill ambassador for the State Department. Nichols and his band performed in the 1950 film Quicksand starring Mickey Rooney. In 1956, he was the subject of an episode of the television program This Is Your Life in which he reunited with Miff Mole, Phil Harris, and Jimmy Dorsey, who praised Nichols as a bandleader who ensured everyone was paid.

=== Death ===
In 1965, Nichols took his Five Pennies band to the Mint Hotel in Las Vegas. On June 28, 1965, a few days after he began performing, he had chest pains while he was sleeping. He phoned the front desk, but was dead by the time the ambulance arrived. The band performed as scheduled with a spotlight on Nichols' empty chair.

=== Biographical film and film career ===
In 1929, he appeared in the Vitaphone film short (reel #870) with his band the Five Pennies along with Eddie Condon and Pee Wee Russell.

In 1935, he appeared in the Paramount Pictures film short The Parade of the Maestros along with Ferde Grofe performing "In the Middle of a Kiss".

Red Nichols performed in and is also mentioned in the 1950 Mickey Rooney and Jeanne Cagney film Quicksand. Rooney's character asks out Jean Cagney; he asks if she likes "Red Nichols and his outfit?" and she responds, "I think they're great!" They then go to the club to watch Red Nichols and his band perform.

The 1959 Hollywood film The Five Pennies, the film biography of Red Nichols, starring Danny Kaye as Red Nichols, was loosely based on Nichols' life and career. Nichols played his own cornet parts for the film and appeared briefly as one of the "Clicquot Club Eskimos" on screen. The Paramount Pictures movie received four Academy Award nominations. Jazz contemporary Louis Armstrong also appeared in the film. The Five Pennies movie theme song and other songs for the film were composed by Sylvia Fine, Danny Kaye's wife.

Nichols also made cameo appearances in the 1951 film Disc Jockey with Tommy Dorsey, and The Gene Krupa Story in 1959.

His recording of "Poor Butterfly" is heard in the 1994 Woody Allen film Bullets Over Broadway and his recording of "(Back Home Again in) Indiana" in Allen's 1999 film Sweet and Lowdown.

== Film shorts ==
Red Nichols and his band appeared in several musical film shorts. The first was Red Nichols & His Five Pennies (1929), a Vitaphone short directed by Murray Roth. Red Nichols' Five Pennies play "Ida", "Whispering", "Nobody's Sweetheart", "Who Cares", and "China Boy". The musicians are Red Nichols (cornet), Tommy Thune and John Egan (trumpet), Herb Taylor (trombone), Pee Wee Russell (clarinet), Irving Brodsky (piano), Eddie Condon (banjo and vega lute) and George Beebe (drums).

In 1935, the film short Million Dollar Notes was released by Paramount Pictures, directed by Fred Waller and produced by Adolph Zukor. The songs performed were "St. Louis Blues", "Rhythm of the Dixieland Band", and "Everybody Loves My Baby". The following year, in 1936, he and his band appeared in a ten minute film short entitled Red Nichols and His World Famous Five Pennies directed by Joseph Henabery which featured his theme song "Wail of the Winds" written by Harry Warren, "Get Happy", "When It's Sleepy Time Down South", "Troublesome Trumpet", "Cryin' for the Carolines", "Carolina in the Morning" written by Walter Donalson, and "Can't Yo' Heah Me Callin' Caroline".

In the 1950s, Snader Telescriptions were recorded for Entrance of the Gladiators (1952), Three Blind Mice (1952), American Patrol (1951), Battle Hymn of the Republic (1950) and Back Room Entrance. These were live performances produced by Louis D. Snader in Hollywood. Back Room Blues (1950) was directed by Louis "Duke" Goldstone.

== Awards and honors ==
In 1986, Red Nichols was inducted into the Big Band and Jazz Hall of Fame.

== Compositions ==
He wrote or co-wrote the following songs: "Hurricane" with Paul Madeira Mertz, "You're Breakin' Me Down" with Glenn Miller, "Five Pennies", "Sugar" with Jack Yellen, Milton Ager, and Frank Crum, "Bug-A-Boo", "The Parade of the 'Pennies'", "The King Kong", "Trumpet Sobs", "Get Cannibal", "Junk Man's Blues", "Delta Roll", "Corky", "Bugler's Lament", "Nervous Charlie Stomp", "Last Dollar", "That's No Bargain", and "Blues at Midnight".

== Discography ==
- 1924–27 – Red Nichols On Edison Recorded In New York 1924-1927 (Timeless HIstorical, ?)
- 1926–32 – Complete Brunswick Sess Vol. 1-9 (9CD) (Jazz Oracle, ?)
- 1939–40 – Wail of the Winds (Hep, 1998)
- 1944 – Red Nichols and His Five Pennies (Tops, 1957) Radio Transcriptions
- 1945-49 – Jazz Time (Capitol, 1950) 10" LP
- 1953 – Syncopated Chamber Music (Audiophile, ?) reissued in 1986 with same title
- 1955 – In Love With Red (Capitol, 1956)
- 1956 – Hot Pennies (Capitol, 1956)
- 1956 – Sessions, Live (Calliope, 1976)
- 1958 – Sessions, Live (Calliope, 1976) Stars of Jazz TV-Show,
- 1958 – Parade of the Pennies (Capitol, 1958)
- 1958 – Red Nichols at the Marineland (Capitol, 1958)
- 1959 – Meet the Five Pennies (Capitol, 1959)
- 1959 – Dixieland Dinner Dance (Capitol, 1960)
- 1961 – Dixieland Supper Club (Capitol, 1962)
- 1963 – Blues & Old Time Rags (Capitol, 1964)
