= Flashes (song) =

1931 sheet music cover, Robbins Music, New York.

"In the Dark" and "Flashes" released by Jess Stacy as a Decca 78, 18119A, 1941.

"Flashes" is a 1931 jazz composition for solo piano by cornetist Bix Beiderbecke. It is the third work in a series of four compositions for piano composed by Bix Beiderbecke during his career.

== Background ==
Bix Beiderbecke did not record "Flashes" himself but copyrighted the composition on April 18, 1931, along with "In the Dark", also a piano work, as "A Modern Composition for the Piano". Bill Challis assisted with the transcription for piano. According to Challis, Beiderbecke wrote the piece quickly and chiefly because he needed the money.

The published score is marked Moderato and carries no key signature. Challis described the piece as following the same formula as "In the Dark", with a rhythmic main part framing a more lyrical middle section, and as shorter and more repetitious than the earlier "In a Mist". Its harmonies draw on the whole-tone patterns and ninth and eleventh chords that Beiderbecke had taken from the Impressionist composers Debussy and Ravel. The pianist Bryan Wright, who recorded all four of the solos in 2010, wrote that despite drawing on such harmonies the pieces are "not impressionistic in terms of form" but "adhere to clearly delineated structures". According to Wright, the solos "forego an introduction and begin with a sixteen-measure A-section [...] most contain clear-cut B- and C-sections of regular lengths (eight or sixteen measures), often with a repeat of the A-section sandwiched in between", and all of them "close by restating the A-section in its original key, followed by a brief coda". The pianist Paul Mertz held that it should be played faster than Beiderbecke's other piano solos, while Challis, who had marked the score Moderato, maintained that all four should be taken at the same tempo.

== Notable recordings ==
"Flashes" was first recorded by jazz pianist Jess Stacy on November 15, 1935. Jazz trumpeter Bunny Berigan recorded it in 1939 and released it as a 78 single on RCA Victor, 26121-A. Ry Cooder included it on his 1978 album Jazz, and jazz guitarist Bucky Pizzarelli recorded it on his 1986 Stash album Solo Flight. In 2010, pianist Bryan Wright recorded the work along with Beiderbecke's three other piano compositions, "In a Mist", "Candlelights", and "In the Dark", and in 2020 Juliet Kurtzman and Pete Malinverni recorded an arrangement for violin and piano on the album Candlelight: Love in the Time of Cholera.

The composition has also been recorded by Geoff Muldaur in 2003, Tony Caramia on the 2005 album Zebra Stripes, Helmut Nieberle in 2005, and Patrick Artero in 2006, as well as Dick Hyman, Bernd Lhotzky, and Dill Jones.

== Sources ==
- Berton, Ralph. Remembering Bix. Harper & Row, 1974.
- Castelli, Vittorio, Evert (Ted) Kaleveld, and Liborio Pusateri. The Bix Bands: A Bix Beiderbecke Disco-biography. Raretone, Milan, 1972.
- Collins, David R. Bix Beiderbecke: Jazz Age Genius. Morgan Reynolds, Inc., Greensboro, North Carolina, 1998.
- Evans, Philip R.; Evans, Linda K. (1998). Bix: The Leon Bix Beiderbecke Story. Bakersfield, Calif.: Prelike Press. ISBN 0-9665448-0-3.
- Lastella, Aldo. "La vita e la leggenda di Bix Beiderbecke". Nuovi Equilibri S.R.L., Roma, 1991.
- Sudhalter, Richard M.; Evans, Philip R. (1974). Bix: Man and Legend. New Rochelle, N.Y.: Arlington House. ISBN 0-87000-268-6.
