= One Morning in May (album) =

One Morning In May

Studio album by Bucky Pizzarelli
- Released: June 5, 2001
- Genre: Swing
- Length: 58:02
- Label: Arbors Records

One Morning In May is a solo jazz guitar album by Bucky Pizzarelli of jazz standards, released in 2001 by Arbors Records.

== Track listing ==
No.	Title	Writer(s)	Length
1.	"Guess I'll Go Back Home"	Willard Robison; Ray Mayer	2:18
2.	"One Morning in May"	Hoagy Carmichael; Mitchell Parish	2:21
3.	"Laura"	Johnny Mercer; David Raksin	3:06
4.	"A Blues Serenade"	Jimmy Lytell; Mitchell Parish; Frank Signorelli; Vincent Grande	3:11
5.	"Candle Lights"	Bix Beiderbecke	5:22
6.	"This Nearly Was Mine"	Richard Rodgers; Oscar Hammerstein II	2:00
7.	"Serenata"	Leroy Anderson; Mitchell Parish	2:52
8.	"Lush Life"	Billy Strayhorn	3:10
9.	"A Flower Is a Lovesome Thing"	Billy Strayhorn	2:06
10.	"Wait Till You See Her"	Richard Rodgers; Lorenz Hart	2:51
11.	"Bess, You Is My Woman Now"	George Gershwin; Ira Gershwin; DuBose Heyward	2:19
12.	"In a Mist"	Bix Beiderbecke	4:48
13.	"Blood Count"	Billy Strayhorn	2:52
14.	"All This and Heaven Too"	Eddie DeLange; James Van Heusen	1:56
15.	"Warm Valley"	Duke Ellington	2:45
16.	"Stars in Your Eyes"	Fritz Kreisler; Dorothy Fields	1:47
17.	"Cottage for Sale"	Larry Conley; Willard Robison	3:12
18.	"Old Folks"	Willard Robison; Dedette Lee Hill	1:45
19.	"Autumn Nocturne"	Josef Myrow; Kim Gannon	2:40
20.	"Someone to Watch Over Me"	George Gershwin; Ira Gershwin	2:38
21.	"Goodbye"	Gordon Jenkins	2:03
Total length:			58:02

== Personnel ==
- Bucky Pizzarelli – guitar
- Jay Dittamo – engineer

== Reception ==
Professional ratings
Review scores
Source	Rating
AllMusic	3/5 stars
The Penguin Guide to Jazz Recordings	3/4 stars

Ronnie D. Lankford Jr. reviewed the album for AllMusic, commenting that it "should appeal to anyone who enjoys quality guitar jazz, and will certainly appeal to Pizzarelli's fans."
