= One Morning in May =

One Morning in May may refer to:

- "One Morning in May" (folk song), traditional folk song
- "One Morning in May" (1933 song), jazz standard by Hoagy Carmichael and Mitchell Parish
- One Morning in May (album), 2001 jazz album by Bucky Pizzarelli
