= Phil Napoleon =

American jazz trumpeter and bandleader (1901–1990)

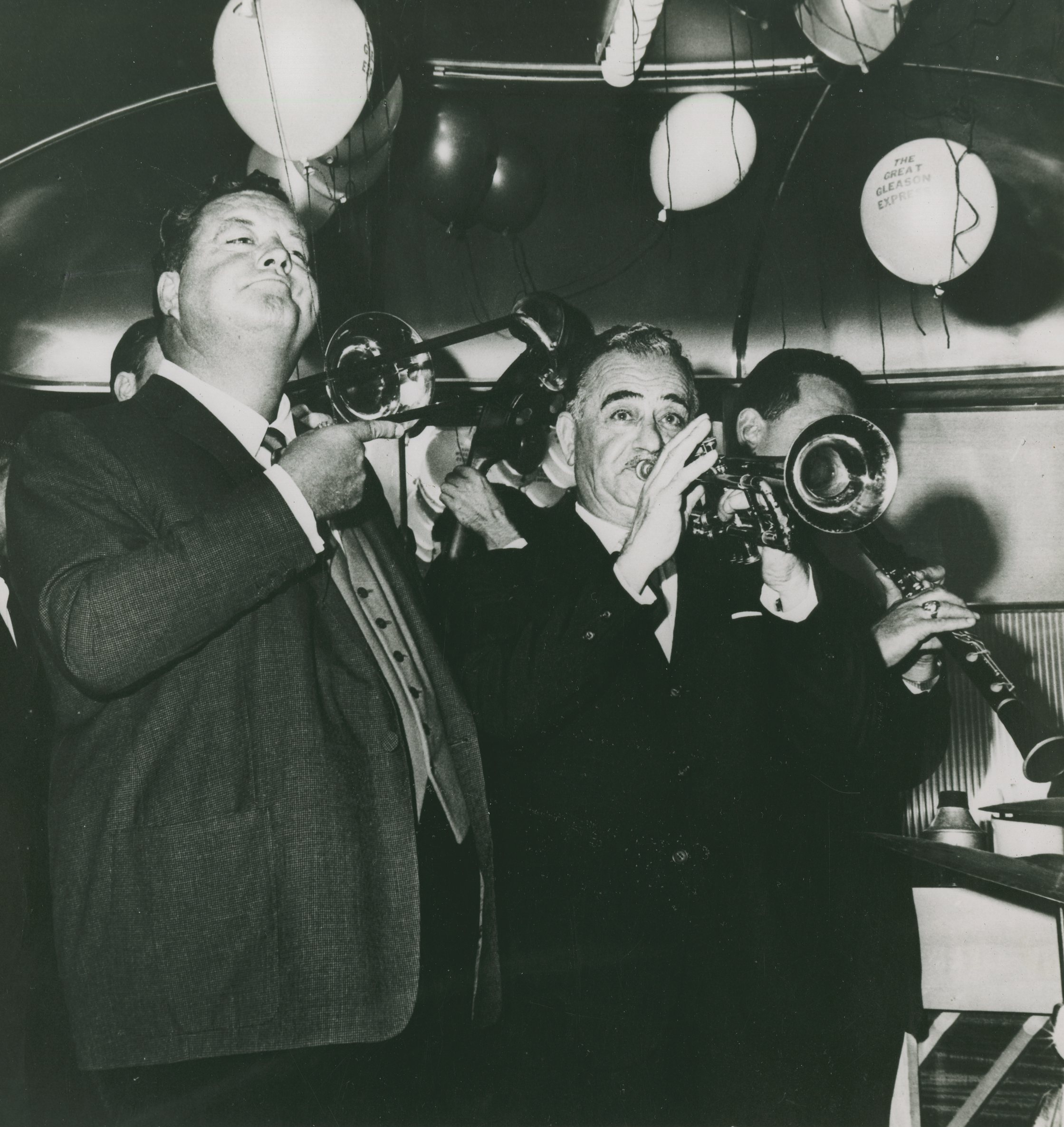
- Jackie Gleason and Phil Napoleon on stage

Background information
- Birth name: Filippo Napoli
- Born: September 2, 1901; Boston, Massachusetts, US
- Died: October 1, 1990 (aged 89); Miami, Florida, US
- Genres: Jazz
- Instrument: Trumpet
- Years active: 1910s–1980s

Phil Napoleon (born Filippo Napoli; September 2, 1901 – October 1, 1990) was an early jazz trumpeter and bandleader born in Boston, Massachusetts. Ron Wynn observed that Napoleon "was a competent, though unimaginative trumpeter whose greatest value was the many recording sessions he led that helped increase jazz's popularity in the mid-1920s." Richard Cook and Brian Morton, writing for The Penguin Guide to Jazz, refer to Napoleon as "a genuine pioneer" whose playing was "profoundly influential on men such as Red Nichols and Bix Beiderbecke."

Napoleon began with classical training, and was performing publicly by age five. In the 1910s, he was one of the first musicians in the northeastern United States to embrace the new "jass" style brought to that part of the country by musicians from New Orleans, Louisiana. With pianist Frank Signorelli he formed the group "The Original Memphis Five" in 1917. He became one of the most sought after trumpeters of the 1920s. The group were very prolific, one of the most prolific in New York City at the time, and in 1922 to 1923 alone made over a hundred recordings. Napoleon's 1927 version of "Clarinet Marmalade" was a particular success. The Original Memphis Five split in 1928. During the 1930s, Napoleon mainly worked as a session trumpeter, working in the RCA Radio Orchestra in the early 1930s, and in 1937 unsuccessfully tried to form his own orchestra. He also worked as a network house conductor and trumpet soloist for NBC from around 1929 to 1937. He recorded with the Cotton Pickers and the Charleston Chasers and also worked with blues singers Leona Williams and Alberta Hunter.

Napoleon joined Jimmy Dorsey's then Los Angeles–based group in the mid-1940s, and he appeared with the band in the film Four Jills in a Jeep. Parting with Dorsey in 1947, he moved back to New York and worked as a studio musician at NBC until 1949 to 1950 when he reformed The Original Memphis Five. During the early 1950s the group became noted for their performances at Nick's in New York City. He also worked frequently with his nephew Marty Napoleon, a jazz pianist. On July 3, 1959, Napoleon and The Five performed at the Newport Jazz Festival, later released as an album. In 1966, he opened up his own club named "Napoleon's Retreat" in Miami, Florida, where he lived until his death, although continued to perform Dixieland jazz in the club up until the 1980s.
