= Jimmy Henderson (musician) =

American trombonist and bandleader (1921–1998)

- Born: May 20, 1921; Wichita Falls, Texas, U.S.
- Died: June 10, 1998 (aged 77); New York City, New York, U.S.
- Genres: Jazz
- Instruments: Trombone

Jimmy Henderson (May 20, 1921 – June 10, 1998) was an American jazz trombonist and bandleader.

== Early life and education ==
Henderson was born in Wichita Falls, Texas. He began playing piano at age six and picked up trombone a few years later. By age 13, he had joined a musicians' union and was first chair at the Wichita Falls Symphony Orchestra. He won several trombone competitions by age fourteen and started his own orchestra while still in his teens, in addition to studying at the Cincinnati Conservatory of Music.

== Career ==
Henderson toured with the big bands of Hal McIntyre, Jimmy Dorsey, and Tommy Dorsey. In 1954, he moved to Los Angeles, where he did copious work as a session musician for some 20 years. Among his credits in the studios was the soundtrack for Bonanza. From 1957 to 1960, he was also a member of Lawrence Welk's orchestra in which he appeared weekly on the Maestro's television show. He led his own orchestra for fifteen years, and was the musical director for the Emmy Awards, Television Academy Honors, and Directors Guild of America Awards. In the 1970s, he led the Glenn Miller Orchestra ghost band before retiring in 1980.

== Discography ==
=== As sideman ===
- Elmer Bernstein, Music from the Soundtrack of the Man with the Golden Arm (Decca, 1956)
- Frank Capp, Percussion in a Tribute to Lawrence Welk (Kimberly, 1963)
- Mel Henke, La Dolce Henke (Warner Bros., 1962)
- B.B. King, Compositions of Duke Ellington and Others (Eros, 1961)
- Glenn Miller, The Direct Disc Sound of the Glenn Miller Orchestra (Great American Gramophone, 1977)
- Zulema, Ms. Z. (Sussex, 1973)
