= Davenport Blues =

1925 song composed and recorded by Bix Beiderbecke

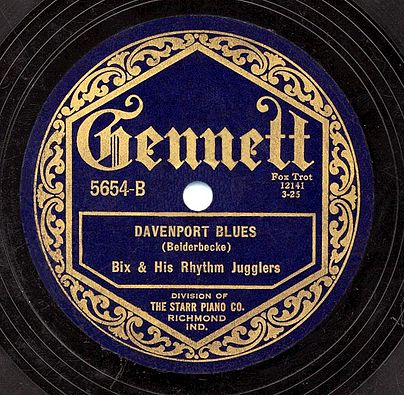
"Davenport Blues" as a 1925 Gennett 78, 5654-B, by Bix Beiderbecke and the Rhythm Jugglers

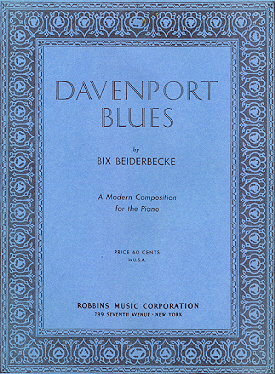
1927 sheet music cover, "Davenport Blues", Robbins Music, New York

"Davenport Blues" is a 1925 jazz composition written and recorded by Bix Beiderbecke and released as a Gennett 78. The song has become a jazz and pop standard.

== Background ==
"Davenport Blues" was recorded by Bix Beiderbecke and His Rhythm Jugglers at the Gennett studio on Monday, January 26, 1925, in Richmond, Indiana, and released as Gennett 5654 backed with "Toddlin' Blues" as the A side. The band consisted of Tommy Dorsey on trombone, Paul Madeira Mertz on piano, Don Murray on clarinet, Howdy Quicksell on banjo, Tom Gargano on drums, and Bix Beiderbecke on cornet. Hoagy Carmichael was present at the recording session. The title derives from the name of Bix Beiderbecke's hometown of Davenport, Iowa.

The instrumental is made up of a four bar introduction, a 16 bar verse followed by a 32 bar chorus, after which the verse and chorus are repeated with a 2 bar extended ending. The same melody is used for the verses, but both choruses have different melodies though nearly identical chords. Only on the last refrain of the chorus do we hear the melody which can be identified as "Davenport Blues". Both choruses end in different chord progressions. In the first chorus Bix plays breaks over chords.

In 2020, Juliet Kurtzman and Pete Malinverni recorded the song on the Candlelight: Love in the Time of Cholera album.

== Cover versions ==
- Miff Mole and His Molers, 1927, Okeh 40848
- Charleston Chasers under the direction of Red Nichols, 1927, Columbia 909D
- Adrian Rollini and His Orchestra, 1934, Decca 359
- Bunny Berigan and His Orchestra, 1938, Victor 26121B
- Tommy Dorsey and His Orchestra, 1938, Victor 26135
- Gil Evans, 1959, from the album Great Jazz Standards with Johnny Coles on trumpet
- Clare Fischer, 1963, from the album Surging Ahead
- Jack Teagarden
- Bobby Hackett
- Eddie Condon
- Yank Lawson and the V-Disc All Stars on V-Disc No. 404B, 1945.
- Scott Robinson, 2000, from the album Melody From the Sky
- Jimmy Lytell Pathe Actuelle 11557, Perfect 14956, Feb., 1928; Jazz Oracle, 2012
- Russ Freeman
- Barbara Sutton Curtis
- Dill Jones, 1972, from the album Davenport Blues
- Kenny Werner, 1977
- Ry Cooder, 1978, from the album Jazz
- Dutch Swing College Band
- Randy Sandke
- Lawson-Haggart Jazz Band
- Bix movie soundtrack album, 1991
- Dice of Dixie Crew
- Dick Hyman
- Geoff Muldaur
- Patrick Artero, 2006
- Scandinavian Rhythm Boys, 2007
- Harry Gold and His Pieces of Eight
- David Sanborn, 2010
- Bucky Pizzarelli, 2012
- Ryan Truesdell, 2015
- Juliet Kurtzman and Pete Malinverni, Candlelight: Love in the Time of Cholera, 2020
- Josh Duffee's Greystone Monarchs, 2024
- Forrest Hill Owls, 2024
- Malo Mazurié featuring Noé Huchard, Raphael Dever and David Grebi, Taking the Plunge, 2024

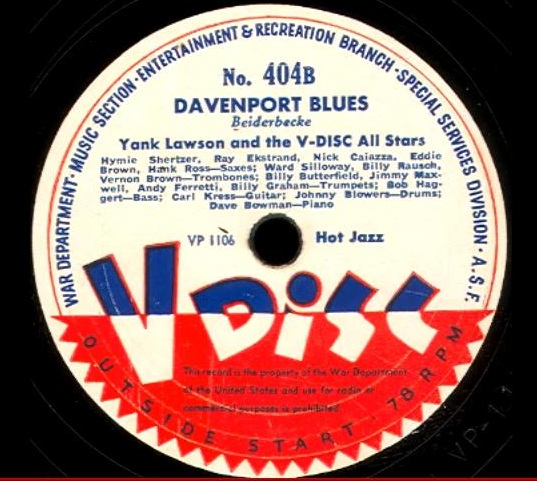
"Davenport Blues" as V Disc 404B by Yank Lawson and the V-Disc All Stars, VP 1106, Hot Jazz, 1945.
