= Leon Bismark Beiderbecke House =

Historic house in Iowa, United States

- U.S. National Register of Historic Places
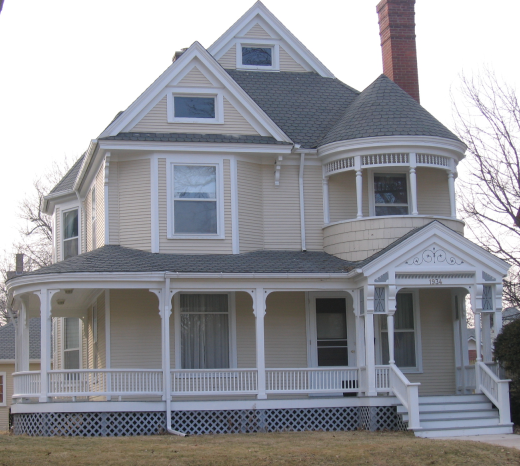

- Location within Iowa Location within the United States
- Location: 1934 Grand Ave. Davenport, Iowa
- Coordinates: 41°32′20″N 90°33′55″W
- Area: less than one acre
- Architectural style: Late Victorian
- NRHP reference No.: 77000554
- Added to NRHP: July 13, 1977

Leon Bismark Beiderbecke House is a historic building located on the east side of Davenport, Iowa, United States. The house is the birthplace and boyhood home of jazz musician Leon Bismark "Bix" Beiderbecke and so the house is also known simply as the Bix Beiderbecke House. It has been listed on the National Register of Historic Places since 1977. In 2026 the house was purchased by a collaboration of jazz musicians who began extensive renovations to the property.

== Leon Bismark Beiderbecke ==
Leon Bismark Beiderbecke, nicknamed Bix, was born in this house on March 10, 1903, and grew up here. His father, Bismark Herman Beiderbecke, was a son of German immigrants and was the owner of East Davenport Lumber and Coal Company. His mother, Agatha Jane (Hilton) Beiderbecke, was the daughter of a riverboat pilot and was the organist at First Presbyterian Church. Bix learned to play the piano by ear in the family home. By the age of three he could play simple melodies. The Davenport Democrat published an article about his musical accomplishments when he was six years old.

As he grew older he would go down to the Mississippi River to listen to the jazz music that could be heard playing on the riverboats. Beiderbecke heard Louis Armstrong play for the first time on one of the boats. He would also stow away and play the calliopes on the boats. His older brother Charles brought home record albums when he returned from serving in World War I that featured the music of the Original Dixieland Jazz Band. Bix was drawn to the sound of the band's trumpet player Nick LaRocca. Beiderbecke had bought a second-hand cornet when he was 15, and he would slow the turntable down and learn the trumpet lines note-by-note. He played his first public performance at a vaudeville show in the Davenport High School gym. He went on to perform with Neal Buckley's Novelty Orchestra and the Plantation Jazz Orchestra on the stern-wheeler Majestic.

In 1921, Beiderbecke was sent to Lake Forest Academy. Except for a brief period in the early 1920s when he returned home to work for his father, Bix lived the rest of his life away from Davenport as a professional musician playing in jazz bands. He would come home to visit from time to time and when he was here he played with local bands. It is believed that on his visit from December 1924 to January 1925 Bix composed "Davenport Blues" in this house. Beiderbecke died in New York City in 1931 at the age of 28 and is buried in Oakdale Cemetery in Davenport.

== Architecture ==
The Beiderbecke house is located in a neighborhood of similar houses from the Late Victorian era. It is built on a property that includes a 5-foot (2 m) terrace to the sidewalk. The house is situated across the street from a neighborhood park. The rectangular-shaped structure is 26 feet (8 m) wide and 57 feet (17 m) deep. A full-size porch wraps around from the front to the south side of the house. Above the entrance to the porch is a decorative wooden pediment. Above that is a small semi-circular porch topped with a conical roof. Entrance to the smaller porch is from one of the second-floor bedrooms. There is a two-story bay window section that projects from the south side of the house and a projection on the north side that contains a stairwell. There is a small L-shaped addition on the back of the house (date unknown) that contains an enclosed porch and a family room. The house is topped by an irregular gabled roof.

== See also ==
- Bix 7 Road Race
- Bix Beiderbecke Memorial Jazz Festival
