= Clarinet Marmalade =

Jazz standard composed by Larry Shields and Henry Ragas

"Clarinet Marmalade"
Performed by the Dixie Players of the United States Air Force Heritage of America Band

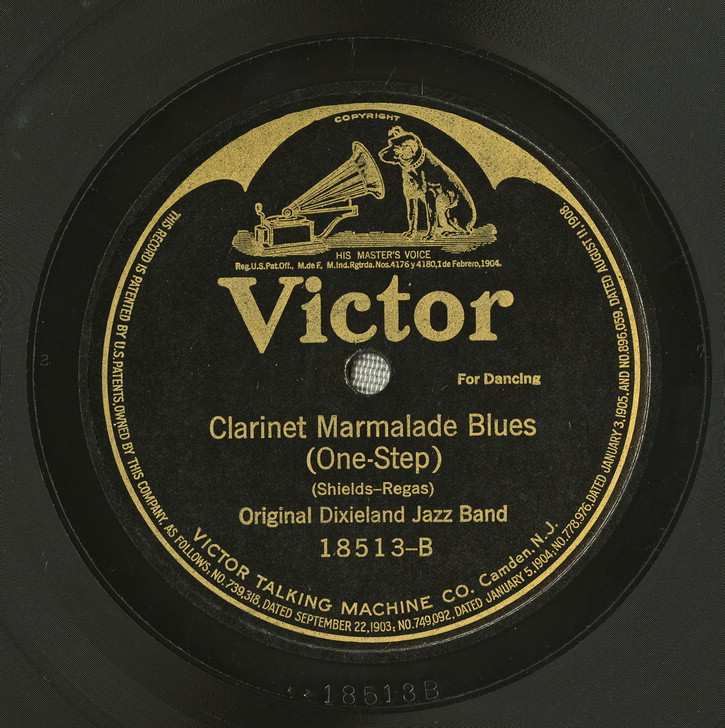
1918 release by the ODJB on Victor as the B side to "Mournin' Blues", 18513-B.

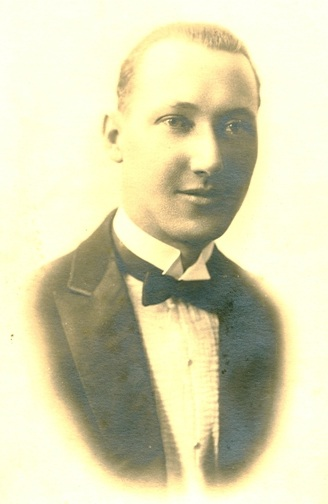
Larry Shields

Clarinet Marmalade, later Clarinet Marmalade Blues, is a 1918 dixieland jazz standard composed by Larry Shields and Henry Ragas of the Original Dixieland Jass Band. It is played in the key of F major. It was recorded by Fletcher Henderson in 1926 and Frankie Trumbauer in 1927.

In 2024, the original 1918 recording was inducted into the National Recording Registry by the Library of Congress as being ''culturally, historically or aesthetically significant''.

== Original recording ==
The original Victor 1918 recording by the Original Dixieland Jass Band is described as a "small-combo ensemble piece with strong links to the march tradition". It was dominated by Larry Shields's solo on clarinet, accompanied by Henry Ragas. "Clarinet Marmalade" was one of the landmark compositions of early jazz and was a very popular jazz standard in the 1920s; the Original Dixieland Jass Band's sound was widely emulated during this period. In 1919, the song became a staple of the touring James Reese Europe band.

== Fletcher Henderson and Frankie Trumbauer recordings ==
Fletcher Henderson's 1926 recording increased the popularity of the tune. He is credited with "transforming it into a vehicle for hot soloists and ensemble riffs, including a new introduction and the streamlining omission of several transitional passages." Henderson's version of "Clarinet Marmalade" was an inspiration for several standards of the period such as "Sugar Foot Stomp" and "King Porter Stomp". It was recorded in the 1927-1929 period by musicians such as Berlyn Baylor, Ted Lewis, Phil Napoleon, Lud Gluskin and Bill Carlsen.

Frankie Trumbauer and his orchestra, featuring Bix Beiderbecke, first recorded a version of the tune in February 1927 to much success. Richard Hadlock has cited Trumbauer's "Clarinet Marmalade" as "a triumph in terms of logical overall structure, melodic symmetry and rhythmic drive, a most extraordinary jazz recording" and opines that Beiderbecke's palette of color through his use of ninths, elevenths and thirteenths and substitution of scales for arpeggios was "about three decades ahead of 1927". Henderson in turn re-recorded "Clarinet Marmalade" in March 1931, inspired in part by Trumbauer's take on it, but with the restoration of the original introduction. Bill Challis's recording represented a "medium" between the different versions, and he also transcribed the piece.

== Compilation album ==
A compilation album of the same name was released in 1994 featuring "25 Great Jazz Clarinetists" such as Benny Goodman, Johnny Dodds, Artie Shaw, Sidney Bechet, Pee Wee Russell, Woody Herman and others.

== Louis Armstrong ==
Louis Armstrong recorded the tune; his interest in it started in New Orleans when he learned the clarinet solo from the original record in addition to the clarinet obbligato of "High Society", which helped to shape his music vocabulary.
