= Fidgety Feet =

Song by Original Dixieland Jass Band
- Recorded: June 1918
- Label: Victor
- Songwriters: Nick LaRocca and Larry Shields

"Fidgety Feet" is a Dixieland jazz standard, first recorded by the Original Dixieland Jass Band in June 1918. The more acclaimed version is the 1924 recording by The Wolverines, with Bix Beiderbecke.

== History ==
The composition is attributed to Nick LaRocca and Larry Shields, of the Original Dixieland Jass Band, who first recorded it New York on June 25, 1918, and released it on Victor 18564.

The Wolverines, featuring Bix Beiderbecke, recorded a hit version of the song on 18 February 1924. Fletcher Henderson's orchestra recorded the tune on 19 March 1927, and it was released on July 7 of that year.

Notable jazz artists who later recorded it include Bud Freeman, Kid Ory and His Creole Band, Red Allen, Sidney Bechet, and Wingy Manone, and stride pianists Willie "The Lion" Smith and Dick Wellstood.

== Composition ==
It begins in B♭ major and modulates to A♭ major. Beiderbecke biographer Jean Pierre Lion wrote that the 1918 original recording was "played at a jumpy tempo, sounds mechanical, and the trombone' s plaintive breaks are dated" . He approved more of the Wolverines recording which was recorded at a slower tempo, stating that it is more "relaxed and varied, breaks are more sophisticated, and Jimmy Hatwell's solo, using the lower register is deeply original. Lion states that Beiderbecke avoided repetition on the second time through the chorus inserting "some graceful melodic lines within a rich harmony".
