= Don Murray (clarinetist) =

American jazz clarinet and saxophone player (1904–1929)

- Born: Donald Murray; June 7, 1904; Joliet, Illinois, U.S.
- Died: June 2, 1929 (aged 24) Los Angeles, California, U.S.
- Genre: Jazz
- Instruments: Clarinet, saxophone

Don Murray (June 7, 1904 – June 2, 1929) was an American jazz clarinet and saxophone player.

== Early life ==
Murray was born in Joliet, Illinois, and attended high school in Chicago. In his teens, he made a name for himself as one of the best young jazz clarinetists and saxophonists in the city.

== Career ==
In 1923, Murray recorded with the New Orleans Rhythm Kings; according to Rhythm Kings leader Paul Mares, Murray was not a regular member of the band, but was a friend who sometimes sat in with them. Murray also made early recordings with Muggsy Spanier. He then joined the Detroit, Michigan based band of Jean Goldkette, with whom he remained until 1927. It was here that he mentored the young Jimmy Dorsey. He also played baritone saxophone on some recordings with Joe Venuti and Eddie Lang, under the band name “Joe Venuti’s Blue Four” playing the baritone saxophone very much like Adrian Rollini’s bass saxophone style.

After a brief stint with Adrian Rollini's band, during which he contributed to several highly regarded recordings by Bix Beiderbecke, Murray was hired by Ted Lewis. Ted Lewis said that Murray was the greatest clarinetist he ever had in his band. Murray can be heard on the soundtrack of the Ted Lewis film Is Everybody Happy? (1929), which is considered a "lost film."

In 2021, the Bix Beiderbecke Museum and World Archives in Davenport, Iowa, announced that it would raise $12,000 to renovate its permanent exhibit, including Murray's saxophone.

== Death ==
Murray died in 1929 at a Los Angeles hospital after injuries sustained in an automobile accident. Apparently, he was standing on the running board of a moving roadster and fell; he struck the back of his head on the pavement and was then hospitalized with serious head injury. Murray is buried at the Memorial Park Cemetery in Skokie, Illinois.

== Major recordings ==
Murray worked exclusively as a sideman, and appeared on some 240 recordings between 1923 and 1929.

With Bix and His Rhythm Jugglers

- "Toddlin' Blues" / "Davenport Blues", recorded on January 26, 1925, in Richmond, Indiana, and released as Gennett 5654

With Bix Beiderbecke and His Gang (OKeh)

- "At the Jazz Band Ball" / "Jazz Me Blues", recorded on October 5, 1927, in New York, and released as OKeh 40923
- "Royal Garden Blues" / "Goose Pimples", recorded on October 5 and 25, 1927, in New York, and released as OKeh 8544
- "Sorry" / "Since My Best Girl Turned Me Down", recorded on October 25, 1927, in New York, and released as OKeh 41001

With the Jean Goldkette Orchestra (Victor)

- "I Want to See My Tennessee" / "Remember", recorded on November 24, 1924, and released as Victor 19548
- "I Didn't Know", recorded on November 24, 1924
- "Play Me Slow" / "What's the Use of Dreamin'", recorded on November 25, 1924, and released as Victor 19664
- "Honest and Truly", recorded on November 25, 1924, and released as Victor 19528
- "Adoration", recorded on November 25, 1924
- "Idolizing" / "Hush-a-Bye", recorded on October 12, 1926, and released as Victor 20270
- "I'd Rather Be the Girl in Your Arms", recorded on October 12, 1926, and released as Victor 20273
- "Sunday", recorded on October 15, 1926, and released as Victor 20273
- "Cover Me Up with Sunshine", recorded on October 15, 1926, and released as Victor 20588
- "Just One More Kiss", recorded on October 15, 1926, and released as Victor 20300
- "Proud of a Baby Like You", recorded on January 28, 1927, and released as Victor 20469
- "I'm Looking Over a Four Leaf Clover", recorded on January 28, 1927, and released as Victor 20466
- "I'm Gonna Meet My Sweetie Now", recorded on January 31, 1927, and released as Victor 20675
- "Slow River", recorded on May 6, 1927, and released as Victor 20926
- "Blue River", recorded on September 15, 1927, and released as Victor 20981
- "Clementine" (arr. Murray), recorded on September 15, 1927, and released as Victor 20994

With Frankie Trumbauer and His Orchestra (OKeh)

- "Ostrich Walk" / "Riverboat Shuffle", recorded on May 9, 1927, in New York, and released as OKeh 40822
- "I'm Coming Virginia" / "Way Down Yonder in New Orleans" (arr. Murray), recorded on May 13, 1927, in New York, and released as OKeh 40843
- "Three Blind Mice", recorded on August 25, 1927, in New York
- "Krazy Kat" (arr. Murray), recorded on September 28, 1927, in New York, and released as OKeh 40903

With Joe Venuti's Blue Four (OKeh)

- "Dinah" / "The Wild Dog", recorded on March 28, 1928, with Murray on baritone saxophone, and released as OKeh 41025
