= Original Memphis Five =

American early jazz band (1917–1990)

- Also known as: Ladd's Black Aces; The Cotton Pickers
- Genres: Jazz
- Years active: 1917–1990
- Labels: Gennett; Columbia; Brunswick
- Past members: Phil Napoleon; Frank Signorelli; Jimmy Lytell; Miff Mole; Jimmy Durante; Tommy Dorsey; Jimmy Dorsey

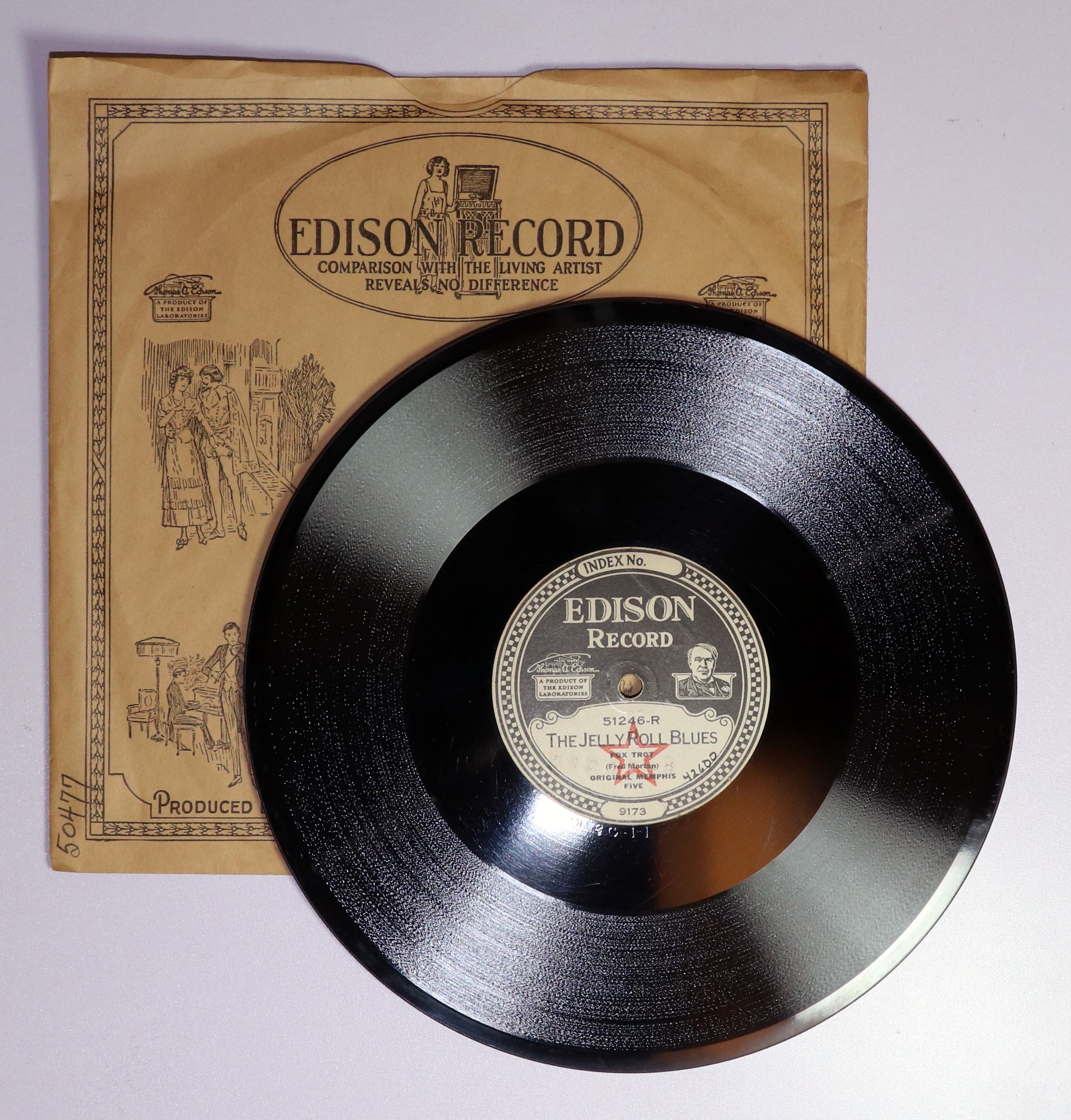
Edison disc record: "The Jelly Roll blues", performed by The Original Memphis Five, recorded in New York, New York on September 22, 1923.

The Original Memphis Five was an early jazz quintet founded in New York City in 1917 by trumpeter Phil Napoleon and pianist Frank Signorelli. Its definitive lineup took shape after Miff Mole met Napoleon at Reisenweber's, where the Original Dixieland Jazz Band was playing. Jimmy Lytell was a member from 1922 to 1925. The group made many recordings between 1921 and 1931, sometimes under different names, including Ladd's Black Aces and The Cotton Pickers. Richard Cook and Brian Morton, writing for The Penguin Guide to Jazz, refer to the group as "one of the key small groups of the '20s".

The name Original Memphis Five was first used in 1920, and applied to small groups of white musicians throughout the decade. Napoleon later said he chose the name as a tribute to W. C. Handy's Memphis-based orchestra. The Ladd's Black Aces name was used from 1921 until 1924. Cook and Morton identify Jimmy Lytell and Miff Mole as standout musicians in the group. Jimmy Durante played piano with Ladd's Black Aces, while both Tommy and Jimmy Dorsey were members of the Original Memphis Five. Occasional vocalists were Anna Meyers, Annette Hanshaw and Vernon Dalhart (as George White).

Both Red Nichols and Miff Mole later led their own groups named Original Memphis Five. Phil Napoleon, however, would continue using the group name into the 1980s.

== Discography ==
- 1922-26 - Pathè Instrumentals (2CD) (Retrieval, ?)
- 1923-31 - Columbias_The Complete Set (Retrieval, ?)
- 1928-29 - Original Memphis Five-Napoleons Emperors-The Cotton Pickers (Timeless Historical, ?)
