= Dill Jones =

Welsh jazz pianist (1923–1984)

Background information
- Also known as: Dill Jones
- Born: Dillwyn Owen Paton Jones; 19 August 1923; Newcastle Emlyn, Carmarthenshire, Wales
- Died: 22 June 1984 (aged 60) New York City, United States
- Genres: Dixieland, jazz, swing, stride, ragtime
- Occupations: Pianist composer
- Instrument: Piano

Dillwyn Owen Paton "Dill" Jones (19 August 1923 – 22 June 1984), was a Welsh jazz stride pianist.

== Biography ==
Dill Jones was born in Newcastle Emlyn, Carmarthenshire, Wales, on 19 August 1923. He was brought up in Talgarth and Llandovery, with extended family holidays in New Quay on the Cardiganshire coast where his father, Islwyn Jones, had been born and brought up. Music was in the family: his mother, Lavinia (née Bevan), was a pianist and his aunt, Isawel Jones, played the organ in Tabernacle chapel in New Quay. She gave Jones piano lessons during his holidays in New Quay. It was as a 10-year-old that Jones was turned onto jazz by hearing records by Fats Waller and Bix Beiderbecke on the radio.

Jones' sister, Barbara Cassini, also a talented pianist, counts the sea as a lasting influence on his music: "So many of his forebears were seafarers, Cape Horners... the holidays in New Quay, when we were in the water all the time or sailing across it, and later, of course, the navy and the Cunard liners..."

After leaving Llandovery College, Jones followed his father into banking but was called up by the Royal Navy for service in World War II in the Far East. When the war ended he enrolled at Trinity College of Music in London, but did not complete the course, preferring the informality of late night jazz sessions.

Jones joined the Harry Parry Sextet and Vic Lewis' Orchestra before plying his trade as ship's pianist on the luxury liner, the Queen Mary, sailing between New York City and Southampton. This gave him the chance to visit New York's jazz clubs and hear Coleman Hawkins and Lennie Tristano, among others. After his parents retired back to New Quay in 1955, he became a more frequent visitor to the town. He also consolidated his classical training, with lessons from his brother-in-law, the classical pianist, Leonard Cassini.

He formed the Dill Jones Quartet in 1959, and emigrated to the United States in 1961. Settling in New York City, he went to Harlem to take lessons from Luckey Roberts, developing his own reputation as an expert in the Harlem stride style. Jones was soon in demand, and earned his reputation playing with Gene Krupa, Jimmy McPartland and Yank Lawson. Between 1969 and 1973, Jones was a member of the JPJ Quartet with Budd Johnson, Oliver Jackson and Bill Pemberton. They played together for several years, as well as running jazz seminars, including workshops for 70,000 pupils in high schools across America. Jones was also a member of the Harlem Blues and Jazz Band.

Jones never forgot his homeland, returning to Wales and to New Quay almost every year. In 1978 he came back to the UK to perform at the inaugural Welsh Jazz Festival in Cardiff. Record producer Hank O'Neal observed that "To me, Dill always sounded like a musical version of Dylan Thomas...he plays piano the same as Dylan Thomas reads his poetry. And in Dill's case, it is his own songs he plays best, much the same as Thomas's finest readings were of his own work."

== Last days ==
In 1981, Jones sang at the Australian Jazz Festival and complained that his throat was hurting him. The following year, in the spring of 1982, he returned to New Quay to visit his aunt Isawel and to record with Wyn Lodwick, a fellow Welsh jazz musician, before returning to America. Later that year, he was diagnosed with cancer of the larynx and flew to London to have his voice box removed, recuperating at Lodwick's house near Llanelli in Wales. After another visit to New Quay to see Isawel, he returned to America where he worked sporadically throughout 1983, including taking part in the Manassas Jazz Festival, when he played "Please Don't Talk About Me When I'm Gone".

Dill Jones died from throat cancer in Calvary Hospital in the Bronx on 22 June 1984 at the age of 60. Jet said he was "instrumental in bringing jazz to British television when he hosted the BBC's Jazz Club programme." He was honoured later that year at the National Eisteddfod in Lampeter by being posthumously admitted to the Gorsedd of Bards, cited as "one of the leading jazz pianists in the world". The New York Times wrote in his obituary "A versatile, accomplished pianist, he was a master of the Harlem stride style of Fats Waller and a well-known interpreter of the piano music of Bix Beiderbecke".

A double CD anthology of Dill Jones` work was released in 2004, entitled Davenport Blues – Dill Jones plays Bix, Jones and a Few Others. Included amongst the 31 tracks are many of Jones' own compositions, including "New Quay Blues" and "There Are no Flowers in Tiger Bay".

Jones also appears on several tracks on a CD with Wyn Lodwick: Wyn Lodwick and Friends – My 50 Years In Jazz – featuring Dill Jones.

== Reading ==
- Dictionary of Welsh Biography, Dill Jones
- Griffiths, D. (2000) Dill Jones: A Discography, Bielderman.
- Lodwick, W. (2010) Count Yourself In--A Man and His Jazz, Gwasg Carreg Gwalch.
- Thomas, D.N. (2002) Striding Dill Jones – Jazz with Black Hwyl, in Planet, June/July.

== Select discography ==
| Released | Album | Notes | Label |
|---|---|---|---|
| 1974 | Jazz Piano Masters | With Teddy Williams, Eubie Blake and Claude Hopkins | Chiaroscuro Records |
| 2004 | Davenport Blues | Probably a re-release | Chiaroscuro Records |

=== With Kenny Davern ===
| Released | Album | Notes | Label |
|---|---|---|---|
| 2001-05-01 | A Night with Eddie Condon | Kenny Davern album | Arbors Records |
