= Mel Henke =

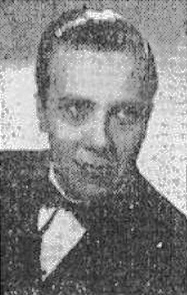
- Henke c. 1943

Background information
- Born: August 4, 1915; Chicago, Illinois
- Died: March 31, 1979 (aged 63) Los Angeles, California
- Genres: Jazz
- Occupations: Musician; bandleader; composer
- Instrument: Piano
- Labels: Contemporary, RCA Victor, Tempo, Vitacoustic, Warner Bros.

Mel Henke (August 4, 1915 – March 31, 1979) was an American jazz pianist, Chicago bandleader, composer, arranger and jingle writer. Henke studied at the Chicago College of Music, then played with Chicago groups with Mitch Todd, Frank Snyder, Stephen Leonard and others. Henke recorded many jazz standards with his own arrangements, including a 1946 piano solo on Bix Beiderbecke's 1928 "In a Mist". His best-known jingles included the Ajax cleanser "stronger than dirt" jingle, for Colgate-Palmolive, and "See the USA in Your Chevrolet" jingle for Chevrolet.
