= Floyd Bean =

American jazz pianist (1904-1974)

- Born: August 30, 1904; Grinnell, Iowa, U.S.
- Died: 9 March 1971 (aged 66); Cedar Rapids, Iowa, U.S.
- Occupation: Jazz pianist

Floyd R. Bean (August 30, 1904, Grinnell, Iowa – March 9, 1974, Cedar Rapids, Iowa) was an American jazz pianist.

Bean led his own band as a teenager and played at the Linwood Inn in Davenport, Iowa. in the mid-1920s, where Bix Beiderbecke would occasionally sit in. He played with local Iowa bands and on the radio station WOC for several years thereafter. He relocated to Chicago in 1933, working with Eddie Niebaur, then Jimmy McPartland and Bob Crosby. In 1940 he played with Wingy Manone and then led a trio of his own. For most of 1943 he worked under Boyd Raeburn, then put together another ensemble to play at the club Brass Rail; soon after this he played with Eddie Stone and Jess Stacy, working as an arranger as well as a pianist. Late in the 1940s he played with Paul Mares and Sidney Bechet, and in the early 1950s with Miff Mole and Muggsy Spanier. He joined Georg Brunis in 1953 and worked with him through the end of the decade; other associations, in the 1950s and later, included Bob Scobey and Bill Reinhardt.
