= Frank Signorelli =

- Born: May 24 1901; New York City, New York, U.S.
- Died: December 9, 1975 (aged 74); New York City, U.S.
- Genres: Jazz music
- Occupation(s): Musician, songwriter
- Instrument: Piano
- Formerly of: Original Memphis Five

Frank Signorelli (May 24, 1901 – December 9, 1975) was an American jazz pianist.

== Biography ==
Signorelli was born to an Italian Sicilian family in New York City, New York.

Signorelli was a founding member of the Original Memphis Five in 1917, then joined the Original Dixieland Jazz Band briefly in 1921. In 1927, he played in Adrian Rollini's New York ensemble, and subsequently worked with Eddie Lang, Bix Beiderbecke, Matty Malneck and Paul Whiteman. In 1935 he was part of Dick Stabile's All-America "Swing" Band. In 1936-38, he played in the revived version of the Original Dixieland Jazz Band. He recorded with Phil Napoleon in 1946 and with Miff Mole in 1958.

== Compositions ==
As a songwriter, Signorelli composed "'I'll Never Be The Same" (initially called "Little Buttercup" by Joe Venuti's Blue Four), "Gypsy", recorded by Paul Whiteman and his Orchestra, "Caprice Futuristic", "Evening", "Anything", "Bass Ale Blues", "Great White Way Blues", "Park Avenue Fantasy", "Sioux City Sue" (1924), "Shufflin' Mose", "Stairway to the Stars", and "A Blues Serenade", recorded by Signorelli in 1926, Glenn Miller and his Orchestra in 1935 and Duke Ellington's version in 1938.

== Death ==
Signorelli died in New York City on December 9, 1975.
