= In the Dark (Bix Beiderbecke song) =

1931 sheet music cover, Robbins Music, New York.

1939 RCA Victor release by Bunny Berigan and His Men, 26122A.

"In the Dark" is a 1931 jazz composition for solo piano by cornetist Bix Beiderbecke. It was the fourth in a series of four piano works composed by Bix Beiderbecke during his career.

== Background ==
Bix Beiderbecke never recorded the composition himself but copyrighted it on April 18, 1931 along with "Flashes", a similar work for solo piano, as "A Modern Composition for the Piano". Bill Challis assisted in the transcription of the composition for piano. The score and sheet music for the composition were published by Robbins Music in New York. Jazz trumpeter Bunny Berigan recorded it on December 1, 1938 in New York and released it as a 78 single in an arrangement for trumpet and big band in 1939. In 2010, pianist Bryan Wright recorded the composition on piano and released it on Rivermont along with the three other piano compositions by Bix Beiderbecke: "In a Mist" (1927), "Candlelights" (1930), and "Flashes" (1931).

A copy of a 1931 "In the Dark" sheet music cover was dedicated and signed by Bix Beiderbecke to trumpeter Leo McConville:

To Leo:

One of the best personally and musically — thanks for saving my life on the Camel Hour numerous times — The Best Bix Beiderbecke.

In 2020, Juliet Kurtzman and Pete Malinverni recorded "In The Dark" in an arrangement for violin and piano on the album Candlelight: Love in the Time of Cholera.

== Notable recordings ==
"In the Dark" has been recorded by Bunny Berigan and His Men, Jack Teagarden, Kenny Werner, Dick Hyman, Bryan Wright, Chris Madsen Trio, Francis Faulin, The Dukes of Dixieland, Oscar Pettiford featuring Tom Talbert, Marco Fumo, Patrick Artero, Geoff Muldaur's Futuristic Ensemble, The Tiger Dixie Band in 2005.

== Album appearances ==
- Bix Beiderbecke: Bix Restored, Vol. 1, Origin Records, 1995
- Bix Beiderbecke: In a Mist: His Best Works, Definitive Classics, 2007
- Juliet Kurtzman and Pete Malinverni: Candlelight: Love in the Time of Cholera. 2020

== Sources ==
- Berton, Ralph. Remembering Bix. Harper & Row, 1974.
- Castelli, Vittorio, Evert (Ted) Kaleveld, and Liborio Pusateri. The Bix Bands: A Bix Beiderbecke Disco-biography. Raretone, Milan, 1972.
- Collins, David R. Bix Beiderbecke: Jazz Age Genius. Morgan Reynolds, Inc., Greensboro, North Carolina, 1998.
- Evans, Philip R. and Linda K. Evans. Bix: The Leon Bix Beiderbecke Story. Bakersfield, Calif.: Prelike Press, 1998. ISBN 0-9665448-0-3.
- Lastella, Aldo. "La vita e la leggenda di Bix Beiderbecke". Nuovi Equilibri S.R.L., Roma, 1991.
