= In a Mist =

1927 song by Bix Beiderbecke

Single by Bix Beiderbecke
- B-side: "Wringin' an' Twistin'"
- Released: October 1927
- Recorded: September 9, 1927, New York City
- Genre: Jazz
- Length: 2:46
- Label: Okeh, Vocalion
- Songwriter: Bix Beiderbecke

Bix Beiderbecke singles chronology
"For No Reason at All in C" (1927)	"In a Mist" (1927)	"Borneo" (1928)

"In a Mist" is a 1927 composition for piano by Bix Beiderbecke.

== Background ==
"In a Mist" was first recorded by Beiderbecke as a piano solo on September 9, 1927, in New York and released as OKeh 40916 backed with "Wringin' an' Twistin'" which was recorded with Frankie Trumbauer and Eddie Lang.

Bix Beiderbecke performed the composition on piano accompanied by Roy Bargy and Lennie Hayton at Carnegie Hall on October 7, 1928, at a jazz concert presented by Paul Whiteman.

== Style ==
"In a Mist" mixes elements of late impressionism with early jazz. While written in C-major, the piece is heavily chromatic. Beiderbecke mostly plays on the fourth and fifth, often inserting sharp or flat accidentals, while avoiding the tonic to increase tension. Harmonically, the piece features melancholic, rich chords; the swing tempo gives the piece a joyful quality. These tensions drive the piece, finally settling on a hopeful C-major.

== Cover versions ==
- Red Norvo, on marimba, 1933.
- Frankie Trumbauer, 1934, including Charlie and Jack Teagarden, Roy Bargy, and Dick McDonough and released as Brunswick 6997.
- Lilian Crawford, 1934, released as Champion 16817.
- Manuel Salsamendi, 1935, recorded on Argentinian Odeon.
- Benny Goodman, 1936 radio broadcast.
- Jess Stacy, recorded from a Benny Goodman Camel Caravan broadcast.
- Bunny Berigan and His Men, 1938
- Larry Clinton, 1938
- Alix Combelle, 1941
- Mel Henke with the Honeydreamers, 1947, as Vitacoustic U-669
- Jimmy McPartland, 1949, with Marian McPartland on piano.
- Harry James, 1950 on Columbia 38902.
- Sal Franzella
- Ralph Sutton, 1950 on Commodore.
- Jess Stacy, 1950 on Columbia.
- The Les Jowett Seven, 1957
- Red Nichols, 1953
- Dill Jones, 1955, the first British recording
- Jimmy McPartland, 1956
- Tom Talbert, 1956
- Sauter-Finegan Orchestra in an arrangement by Eddie Sauter
- Les Jowett, 1957
- Manny Albam, 1958, with Art Farmer, Donald Byrd, Ernie Royal, Bob Brookmeyer, Jerome Richardson, Zoot Sims, Al Cohn, Pepper Adams, Milt Hinton, Osie Johnson, and Eddie Costal.
- Lou Busch, 1958
- Michel Legrand, 1958
- Dick Cathcart, 1959
- The Metropolitan Jazz Octet, 1959
- Johnny Guarnieri, 1961
- Lew Davies, 1962
- Ralph Sutton, 1963
- Clark Terry, 1964
- Armand Hug, 1968, released on Dulai.
- Len Bernard, 1968 on Swaggie.
- Ralph Sutton, 1969
- Dill Jones, 1972, on the Chiaroscuro album Davenport Blues.
- Jack Crossan, 1972
- Freddie Hubbard, 1972
- Bucky Pizzarelli, arranged for guitar, 1974
- Geoff Bland, 1974
- Dick Hyman, 1974
- Swingle Singers, 1975
- Trace, 1975
- Keith Nichols, 1975
- Armand Hug, 1976
- Dave Frishberg, 1977
- Kenny Werner, 1978
- Ry Cooder, 1978
- Vintage Jazz Band, 1978
- Eddie Higgins, 1978
- Charlie Byrd, in a guitar duet with Laurindo Almeida, 1980.
- Franca Mazzola, 1981, released on Carosello.
- Bucky Pizzarelli, with son John, Jr., 1984
- Lou Stein, 1984
- Bob Haggart, 1986
- Marco Fumo, 1987
- Saint Louis Stompers; released in 1988 in Argentina.
- Joe LoCascio, 1988
- Morten Gunnar Larsen, 1989
- Protosynthesis Ensemble, 1990
- Cesare Poggi, 1991
- Bix movie soundtrack, 1991
- Eddie Daniels with Gary Burton, 1992
- Butch Thompson, 1992
- Eddie Daniels, 1992

1928 sheet music cover, "In a Mist", by Bix Beiderbecke, Robbins Music, New York. "Paul Whiteman presents A Modern Composition for the Piano."

- Mike Polad, 1993
- Guy Barker, 1993
- Charlie Byrd and the Washington Guitar Quintet, 1993
- Ralph Sutton, 1993
- Randy Sandke and the New York Allstars, 1993
- Sven-Eric Dahlberg, 1994
- Jess Stacy, 1995
- Roy Eldridge, 1995
- Lincoln Mayorga, 1995
- Eddie Higgins, 1995
- Beau Hunks, 1996
- Robert Smith, 1997
- Joseph Smith, 1998
- Duncan Browne, 1998
- London Symphony Orchestra, 1998
- Charlie Byrd, 1998
- Dick Walter, 1998
- Dean Cotrill, 2000
- Andy Bey, 2001
- Bucky Pizzarelli, 2001
- Mark Atkinson, 2002
- Dick Hyman, 2002
- Geoff Muldaur, 2003
- Vasari Singers, 2003
- Bratislava Serenaders, 2003
- Claude Bolling, 2004
- Philip Aaberg, 2004
- Scott Whitfield Jazz Orchestra East, 2004
- Heinz von Hermann, 2004
- Jim Martinez, 2004
- Westwind Brass, 2005
- Patrick Artero, 2006
- Don Baaska, 2007
- Wolfgang Kohler, 2007
- Brent Watkins, 2007
- Richard Dowling, Rhapsody in Ragtime, 2007
- Ken Mathieson arranged for two brasses, three reeds, and three rhythms, Ken Mathieson's Classic Jazz Orchestra Salutes the Kings of Jazz, 2008
- Bryan Wright, Rivermont Records, 2010
- Bucky Pizzarelli, 2012
- Claudio Cojaniz, 2014
- Juliet Kurtzman and Pete Malinverni, Candlelight: Love in the Time of Cholera, 2020
- Mathis Picard, Live at the Museum, 2022
- Ren Takada, Concert for Modern Times, 2022
- Thomas Gaucher, Brion EP, guitar, 2024
- Shelly Berg and John Sheridan, piano duet, 2024

UK 78 single release of "Bixology (In a Mist)" on Parlophone, R 3504.
