= Candlelights (song) =

1930 sheet music cover, Robbins Music, New York.

1939 Commodore 78 release by Jess Stacy, 517A, Classics in Swing series.

"Candlelights" is a 1930 jazz composition for solo piano by cornetist Bix Beiderbecke. It was the second in the series of four piano works which Bix Beiderbecke composed during his career.

== Background ==
Bix Beiderbecke never recorded "Candlelights" but did copyright the piano score on August 29, 1930, as "A Modern Composition for the Piano". Bill Challis assisted with the transcription for piano. The score and the sheet music were published by Robbins Music in New York. "Candlelights" was recorded by jazz pianist Jess Stacy and was released as a 78 single in 1939 on Commodore Records as part of the Classics in Swing series, 517A. Jazz trumpeter Bunny Berigan subsequently recorded it in 1939 in an orchestral arrangement featuring trumpet. More recently, it was recorded by two other jazz pianists: Kenny Werner recorded it in 1977 on Atlantic Records and pianist Bryan Wright recorded it in 2010. Jazz guitarist Bucky Pizzarelli also recorded a guitar transcription of it in 1986 on his album Solo Flight. In 2020, Juliet Kurtzman and Pete Malinverni recorded it as a duo for violin and piano on the album Candlelight: Love in the Time of Cholera.

== Notable recordings ==
"Candlelights" has been recorded by Jess Stacy, Bunny Berigan, Bryan Wright, Geoff Muldaur's Futuristic Ensemble, Paul Mertz, Ralph Sutton, Oscar Pettiford with Tom Talbert, Tiger Dixie Band, Dick Hyman, Mike Polad, Joseph Smith, Bucky Pizzarelli, Patrick Artero, and Kenny Werner.

== Album appearances ==
The composition appears on the following albums:

- Bix Beiderbecke: Bix Restored, Vol. 1, Origin Records, 1995
- Bix Beiderbecke: 1929-1930, Vol. 8, Masters of Jazz, 1996
- Bix Beiderbecke: In a Mist: His Best Works, Definitive Classics, 2007
- Kenny Werner, The Piano Music of Bix Beiderbecke, Duke Ellington, George Gershwin, James P. Johnson, Atlantic, 1977
- Bucky Pizzarelli: Solo Flight, Stash, 1986
- Juliet Kurtzman and Pete Malinverni: Candlelight: Love in the Time of Cholera, 2020
- Malo Mazurié featuring Noé Huchard, Raphael Dever and David Grebi, Taking the Plunge, 2024

== Sources ==
- Berton, Ralph. Remembering Bix. Harper & Row, 1974.
- Castelli, Vittorio, Evert (Ted) Kaleveld, and Liborio Pusateri. The Bix Bands: A Bix Beiderbecke Disco-biography. Raretone, Milan, 1972.
- Collins, David R. Bix Beiderbecke: Jazz Age Genius. Morgan Reynolds, Inc., Greensboro, North Carolina, 1998.
- Evans, Philip R. and Linda K. Evans. Bix: The Leon Bix Beiderbecke Story. Bakersfield, Calif.: Prelike Press, 1998. ISBN 0-9665448-0-3.
- Lastella, Aldo. "La vita e la leggenda di Bix Beiderbecke". Nuovi Equilibri S.R.L., Roma, 1991.
- Lion, Jean Pierre. Bix: The Definitive Biography of a Jazz Legend: Leon "Bix" Beiderbecke. New York: Continuum, 2005.
- Sudhalter, Richard M. and Philip R. Evans with William Dean-Myatt. Bix: Man and Legend. New Rochelle, N.Y.: Arlington House, 1974. ISBN 0-02-872500-X.
- Teachout, Terry. "Homage to Bix", Commentary, September 2005, pp. 65–68.
