= One Morning in May (1933 song) =

"One Morning in May" is a 1933 traditional popular song with lyrics by Mitchell Parish and music by Hoagy Carmichael.

== Recordings ==
- Hoagy Carmichael – recorded on October 10, 1933 for Victor
- Ray Noble with Al Bowlly – In London 1930–1934
- Bucky Pizzarelli – One Morning in May (2001)
- Frankie Randall – Swingin' Touch
- Dick Todd – recorded August 17, 1939 for Montgomery Ward Records
- Mel Tormé – Prelude to a Kiss (1958)
