= Bix (film) =

1991 film

- Film poster
- Directed by: Pupi Avati
- Written by: Pupi Avati; Antonio Avati; Fred Chalfy; Lino Patruno
- Produced by: Pupi Avati; Gianfranco Piccioli
- Starring: Bryant Weeks
- Cinematography: Pasquale Rachini
- Edited by: Amedeo Salfa
- Release date: 15 May 1991
- Running time: 100 minutes
- Country: Italy
- Language: English

Bix is a 1991 Italian drama film directed by Pupi Avati and starring Bryant Weeks. The plot is about the final years of cornet player Bix Beiderbecke. It was an Official Selection premiering at the 1991 Cannes Film Festival.

== Plot ==
Bryant Weeks plays American jazz cornetist Bix Beiderbecke in an account of his life. The film focuses on his conflicts with his family and his relations with the prominent jazz musicians of the 1920s, such as Hoagy Carmichael, Joe Venuti, Pee Wee Russell, Don Murray, and Paul Whiteman. Mark Sovel plays his friend and collaborator, saxophonist and bandleader Frankie Trumbauer.

The film opens in October 1931 in New York City, two months after the death of Bix Beiderbecke. His brother Burnie arrives in the city to meet Liza, who was to be the future bride of the deceased brother. His investigations of where Bix worked led him to the Italian-American violinist Joe Venuti, the trumpeter's only true friend and therefore unique in knowing the truth and the identity of the girl. Venuti, despite the initial hesitation, decides to help him in the investigation. He contacts the girl and convinces her to follow him to the trumpeter's hometown, Davenport, Iowa, thus fulfilling Bix's mother's desire, who is eager to meet her.

During the long train journey, however, it turns out that Liza never met Bix. Venuti will take advantage of it to tell her, in addition to the way in which Bix came into contact with her, the short but intense life of his friend, who he had met by chance while trying to get an engagement in the Jean Goldkette orchestra. A series of flashbacks follow. Bix was hampered by the fact that he could not read music but played by ear. Bix achieved success when he performed and recorded with the orchestra of Frank Trumbauer who, despite his somewhat peculiar character, took him under his protective wing.

The film ends with Bix's untimely death in 1931 in New York City. During the closing credits, photos of Bix and Liza are shown in the Beiderbecke family home alongside those of his father and mother.

== Cast ==
- Bryant Weeks as Leon Bismark 'Bix' Beiderbecke, a cornet and piano player (1903-1931)
- Emile Levisetti as Joe Venuti, a jazz violin player, Bix' friend
- Brenda K. Mohr as Joe Venuti's girlfriend
- Julia Ewing as Agatha 'Aggie' Beiderbecke, Bix' mother
- Mark Collver as Burnie Beiderbecke, Bix' brother
- Romano Orzari as Hoagy Carmichael, a pianist and jazz band leader
- Gayla Goehl as Kitty, Hoagy Carmichael's girlfriend
- Matthew Buzzell as Don Murray, a jazz clarinettist
- Ray Edelstein as Bismark Beiderbecke, Bix' father
- Mark Sovel as Frankie Trumbauer, a jazz saxophone player
- Barbara Wilder as Marie Louise Beiderbecke, Bix' sister
- Sally Groth as Liza, Bix' alleged fiancée
- Michael T. Henderson as Pee Wee Russell, a jazz clarinettist
- Timothy L. Williams as Esten
- Debbon Ayer as Vera Cox
- Darrell Bishop as Andy Secrest, a jazz cornet player
- Curtis N. Wollan as Paul Whiteman, a jazz band leader
