= Bill Challis =

American jazz arranger (1904–1994)

- Birth name: William H. Challis
- Born: July 8, 1904; Wilkes-Barre, Pennsylvania, U.S.
- Died: October 4, 1994 (aged 90); Harveys Lake, Pennsylvania, U.S.
- Genres: Jazz
- Instruments: Piano, saxophone

William H. Challis (July 8, 1904 – October 4, 1994) was an American jazz arranger, best known for his association with the Paul Whiteman orchestra.

== Early life ==
Challis was born in Wilkes-Barre, Pennsylvania. He played piano and saxophone and was a bandleader at Bucknell University in the early-1920s.

== Career ==
Challis was hired by Jean Goldkette as an arranger in 1926, and moved with Bix Beiderbecke to Paul Whiteman's ensemble in 1927. He wrote scores for Whiteman's full band as well as smaller ensembles drawn from its ranks (such as those led by Frank Trumbauer), and was in part responsible for Beiderbecke's robust representation on Victor Talking Machine Company releases in the late-1920s.

Challis departed from Whiteman's employ in 1930 and did contract arrangements for many major swing-era bands, including the Casa Loma Orchestra, Jimmy and Tommy Dorsey, Lennie Hayton, Fletcher Henderson, Artie Shaw, and Frank Trumbauer. He also arranged for radio broadcasts. Later in his career, he arranged for popular singers and ensembles, including the Casa Loma Orchestra, Bucky Pizzarelli, Glenn Miller, Hoagy Carmichael, the Dorsey Brothers, Coleman Hawkins, and others.

== Personal life ==
Challis died in October 1994, at the age of 90, in Harveys Lake, Pennsylvania.

== Bibliography ==
- Dan Morgenstern, "Bill Challis". The New Grove Dictionary of Jazz. 2nd edition, ed. Barry Kernfeld.
