= Bix Beiderbecke =

American jazz cornetist, pianist and composer (1903–1931)

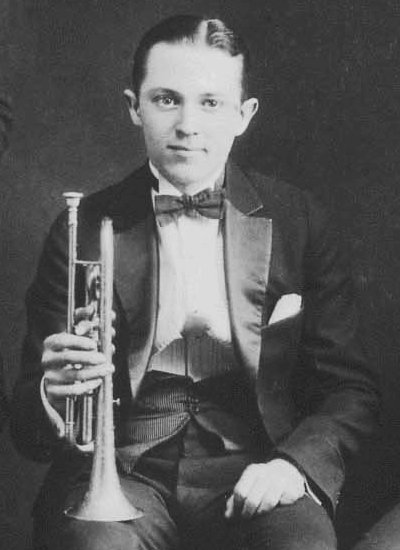
- Beiderbecke c. 1924

Background information
- Born: Leon Bismark Beiderbecke; March 10, 1903; Davenport, Iowa, U.S.
- Died: August 6, 1931 (aged 28) New York City, U.S.
- Genres: Jazz; Dixieland
- Occupations: Musician; composer
- Instruments: Cornet; piano
- Years active: 1920–1931
- Labels: Columbia; Okeh; Victor

Leon Bismark "Bix" Beiderbecke (/ˈbaɪdərbɛk/ BY-dər-bek; March 10, 1903 – August 6, 1931) was an American jazz cornetist, pianist and composer. Beiderbecke was one of the most influential jazz soloists of the 1920s, a cornet player noted for an inventive lyrical approach and purity of tone, with such clarity of sound that one contemporary described it like "shooting bullets at a bell”.

His solos on seminal recordings such as "Singin' the Blues" and "I'm Coming, Virginia" (both 1927) demonstrate a gift for extended improvisation that heralded the jazz ballad style, in which jazz solos are an integral part of the composition. Moreover, his use of extended chords and an ability to improvise freely along harmonic as well as melodic lines are echoed in post-WWII developments in jazz. "In a Mist" (1927) is the best known of Beiderbecke's published piano compositions and the only one that he recorded. His piano style reflects both jazz and classical (mainly impressionist) influences. All five of his piano compositions were published by Robbins Music during his lifetime.

A native of Davenport, Iowa, Beiderbecke taught himself to play the cornet largely by ear, leading him to adopt a non-standard fingering technique that informed his unique style. He first recorded with Midwestern jazz ensemble The Wolverines in 1924, after which he played briefly for the Detroit-based Jean Goldkette Orchestra before joining Frankie "Tram" Trumbauer for an extended engagement at the Arcadia Ballroom in St. Louis, also under the auspices of Goldkette's organisation. Beiderbecke and Trumbauer joined Goldkette's main band at the Graystone Ballroom in Detroit in 1926. The band toured widely and famously played a set opposite Fletcher Henderson at the Roseland Ballroom in New York City in October 1926. He made his greatest recordings in 1927. The Goldkette band folded in September 1927 and, after briefly joining bass saxophone player Adrian Rollini's band in New York, Trumbauer and Beiderbecke joined America's most popular dance band: Paul Whiteman and his Orchestra.

Beiderbecke's most influential recordings date from his time with Goldkette and Whiteman, although he also recorded under his own name and that of Trumbauer's. The Whiteman period marked a precipitous decline in his health due to his increasing use of alcohol. Treatment for alcoholism in rehabilitation centers, with the support of Whiteman and the Beiderbecke family, failed to stop his decline. He left the Whiteman band in 1929 and in the summer of 1931 died aged 28 in his Sunnyside, Queens, New York apartment. (Note: For summaries of Beiderbecke's life, see Lion, Sudhalter/Evans and the documentary film Bix: Ain't None of Them Play Like Him Yet (1981), written and directed by Brigitte Berman.)

His death, in turn, gave rise to one of the original legends of jazz. (Note: For a study of Beiderbecke's legend, see Perhonis.) In magazine articles, (Note: For example, see Ferguson.) musicians' memoirs, (Note: For example, see Carmichael, Condon, and Mezzrow.) novels, (Note: For example, see Baker and Turner.) and Hollywood films, (Note: For example, see Young Man with a Horn, the 1950 Michael Curtiz film adapted from Baker's novel of the same name starring Kirk Douglas, Lauren Bacall, Doris Day, and Hoagy Carmichael. See also the English-language, Italian-produced film, Bix: An Interpretation of a Legend (1991), from director Pupi Avati.) Beiderbecke has been envisaged as a Romantic hero, the "Young Man with a Horn" (a novel, later made into a movie starring Kirk Douglas, Lauren Bacall, Doris Day, and his friend Hoagy Carmichael). His life has often been portrayed as that of a jazz musician who had to compromise his art for the sake of commercialism. Beiderbecke remains the subject of scholarly controversy regarding his full name, the cause of his death and the importance of his contributions to jazz.

He composed or played on recordings that are jazz classics and standards such as "Davenport Blues", "In a Mist", "Copenhagen", "Riverboat Shuffle", "Singin' the Blues", and "Georgia on My Mind".

== Early life ==
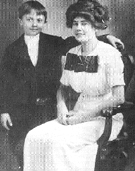
Beiderbecke, age 8, poses with a neighbor, Nora Lasher, in 1911.

The son of Bismark Herman Beiderbecke and Agatha Jane Hilton, Bix Beiderbecke was born on March 10, 1903, in Davenport, Iowa. There is disagreement over whether Beiderbecke was christened Leon Bix or Leon Bismark and nicknamed "Bix". His father was nicknamed "Bix", as was his older brother, Charles Burnette "Burnie" Beiderbecke. Burnie Beiderbecke claimed that the boy was named Leon Bix and biographers have reproduced birth certificates that agree. More recent research — which takes into account church and school records in addition to the will of a relative — suggests he was named Leon Bismark. (Note: See Johnson; also Lion.) Regardless, his parents called him Bix, which seems to have been his preference. In a letter to his mother when he was nine years old, Beiderbecke signed off, "frome your Leon Bix Beiderbecke not Bismark Remeber [sic]".

The son of German immigrants, Beiderbecke's father was a well-to-do coal and lumber merchant named after Otto von Bismarck of his native Germany. Beiderbecke's mother was the daughter of a Mississippi riverboat captain. She played the organ at Davenport's First Presbyterian Church and encouraged young Beiderbecke's interest in the piano.

Beiderbecke was the youngest of three children. His brother, Burnie, was born in 1895, and his sister, Mary Louise, in 1898. He began playing piano at age two or three. (Note: Depending on the source. Feather says age two; Fairweather says age three.) His sister recalls that he stood on the floor and played it with his hands over his head. Five years later, he was the subject of an admiring article in the Davenport Daily Democrat that proclaimed, "Seven-year-old boy musical wonder! Little Bickie Beiderbecke plays any selection he hears."

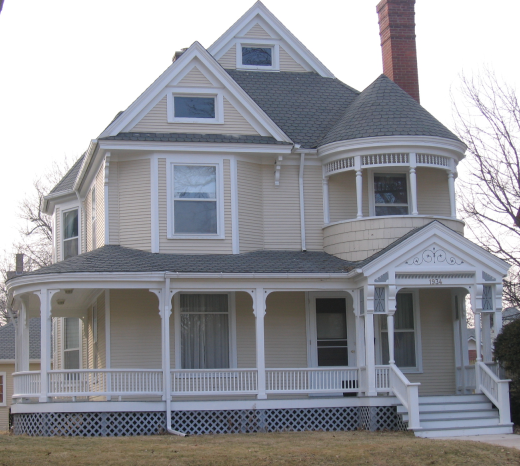
Beiderbecke's childhood home at 1934 Grand Avenue in Davenport, Iowa, is listed on the National Register of Historic Places. It was purchased and renovated by Italian director Pupi Avati for portions of his biopic Bix: An Interpretation of a Legend during the summer of 1990. Photo taken in 2008.

Burnie recalled that he stopped coming home for supper to hurry to the riverfront, slip aboard an excursion boat, and play the calliope. A friend remembered that Beiderbecke showed little interest in the Saturday matinees they attended, but as soon as the lights came on he rushed home to duplicate the melodies the accompanist had played.

When Burnie returned to Davenport at the end of 1918 after serving stateside during World War I, he brought with him a Victrola phonograph and several records, including "Tiger Rag" and "Skeleton Jangle" by the Original Dixieland Jazz Band. From these records, Beiderbecke learned to love hot jazz; he taught himself to play cornet by listening to Nick LaRocca's horn lines. He also listened to jazz from the riverboats that docked in downtown Davenport. Louis Armstrong and the drummer Baby Dodds claimed to have met Beiderbecke when their excursion boat stopped in Davenport. Historians disagree over whether such an event occurred. (Note: While Armstrong and Dodds both claimed that they met Beiderbecke in Davenport, many historians argue it never happened. Berton writes there is "no evidence" the two met in Davenport, while Kenney writes that the two may have met in Louisiana, Missouri. Still, critic and Armstrong biographer Terry Teachout writes inHomage to Bix that Beiderbecke did, in fact, hear Armstrong in Davenport.)

Beiderbecke attended Davenport High School from 1918 to 1921. During this time, he sat in and played professionally with various bands, including those of Wilbur Hatch, Floyd Bean, and Carlisle Evans. In the spring of 1920 he performed for the school's Vaudeville Night, singing in a vocal quintet called the Black Jazz Babies and playing his cornet. At the invitation of his friend Fritz Putzier, he subsequently joined Neal Buckley's Novelty Orchestra. The group was hired for a gig in December 1920, but a complaint was lodged with the American Federation of Musicians, Local 67, that the boys did not have union cards. In an audition before a union executive, Beiderbecke was forced to sight read and failed. He did not earn his card.

On April 22, 1921, a month after he turned 18, Beiderbecke was arrested by two Davenport police officers on an accusation that he had taken a five-year-old girl named Sarah Ivens into a neighbor's garage and committed a lewd and lascivious act with her—a statutory felony in Iowa. According to the police ledger, the girl accused Beiderbecke of "putting his hands on her person outside of her dress." The ledger went on to state that Beiderbecke and the girl "were in an auto in the garage and he closed the door on the girl and she hollered," attracting the attention of two young men who were across the street. The young men "went over [to the garage] and the girl went home." Beiderbecke was released after a $1,500 bail bond was posted. Sarah's father, Preston Ivens, requested that the Scott County grand jury drop the charge to avoid "harm that would result to her in going over this case," and in September 1921, the grand jury returned no indictment, whereupon the County Attorney filed a dismissal of the case. It is not clear from the official documents if Sarah herself had identified Beiderbecke, but the two young men had told her father, when he questioned them a day after the alleged incident, that they had seen Beiderbecke take the girl into the garage. The surviving official documents concerning the arrest and its aftermath – including two police entries and Preston Ivens' grand jury testimony – were first made available in 2001 by Professor Albert Haim on the Bixography website. Jean Pierre Lion in his 2005 biography discussed the incident briefly and printed the texts of the documents. Earlier biographies had not reported the alleged incident.

In September 1921, Beiderbecke enrolled at the Lake Forest Academy, a boarding school north of Chicago in Lake Forest, Illinois. While historians have traditionally suggested that his parents sent him to Lake Forest to discourage his interest in jazz, others believe that he may have been sent away in response to his arrest. Regardless, Mr. and Mrs. Beiderbecke apparently felt that a boarding school would provide their son with both the faculty attention and discipline required to improve his academic performance, necessitated by the fact that Bix had failed most courses in high school, remaining a junior in 1921 despite turning 18 in March of that year. His interests, however, remained limited to music and sports. In pursuit of the former, Beiderbecke often visited Chicago to listen to jazz bands at night clubs and speakeasies, including the infamous Friar's Inn, where he sometimes sat in with the New Orleans Rhythm Kings. He also traveled to the predominantly African-American South Side to listen to classic black jazz bands such as King Oliver's Creole Jazz Band, which featured Louis Armstrong on second cornet. "Don't think I'm getting hard, Burnie," he wrote to his brother, "but I'd go to hell to hear a good band." On campus, he helped organize the Cy-Bix Orchestra with drummer Walter "Cy" Welge and almost immediately got into trouble with the Lake Forest headmaster for performing indecorously at a school dance.

Beiderbecke often failed to return to his dormitory before curfew, and sometimes stayed off-campus the next day. In the early morning hours of May 20, 1922, he was caught on the fire escape to his dormitory, attempting to climb back into his room. The faculty voted to expel him the next day, due both to his academic failings and his extracurricular activities, which included drinking. The headmaster informed Beiderbecke's parents by letter that following his expulsion school officials confirmed that Beiderbecke "was drinking himself and was responsible, in part at least, in having liquor brought into the School." Soon after, Beiderbecke began pursuing a career in music.

He returned to Davenport briefly in the summer of 1922, then moved to Chicago to join the Cascades Band, working that summer on Lake Michigan excursion boats. He gigged around Chicago until the fall of 1923, at times returning to Davenport to work for his father.

== Career ==
=== Wolverines ===
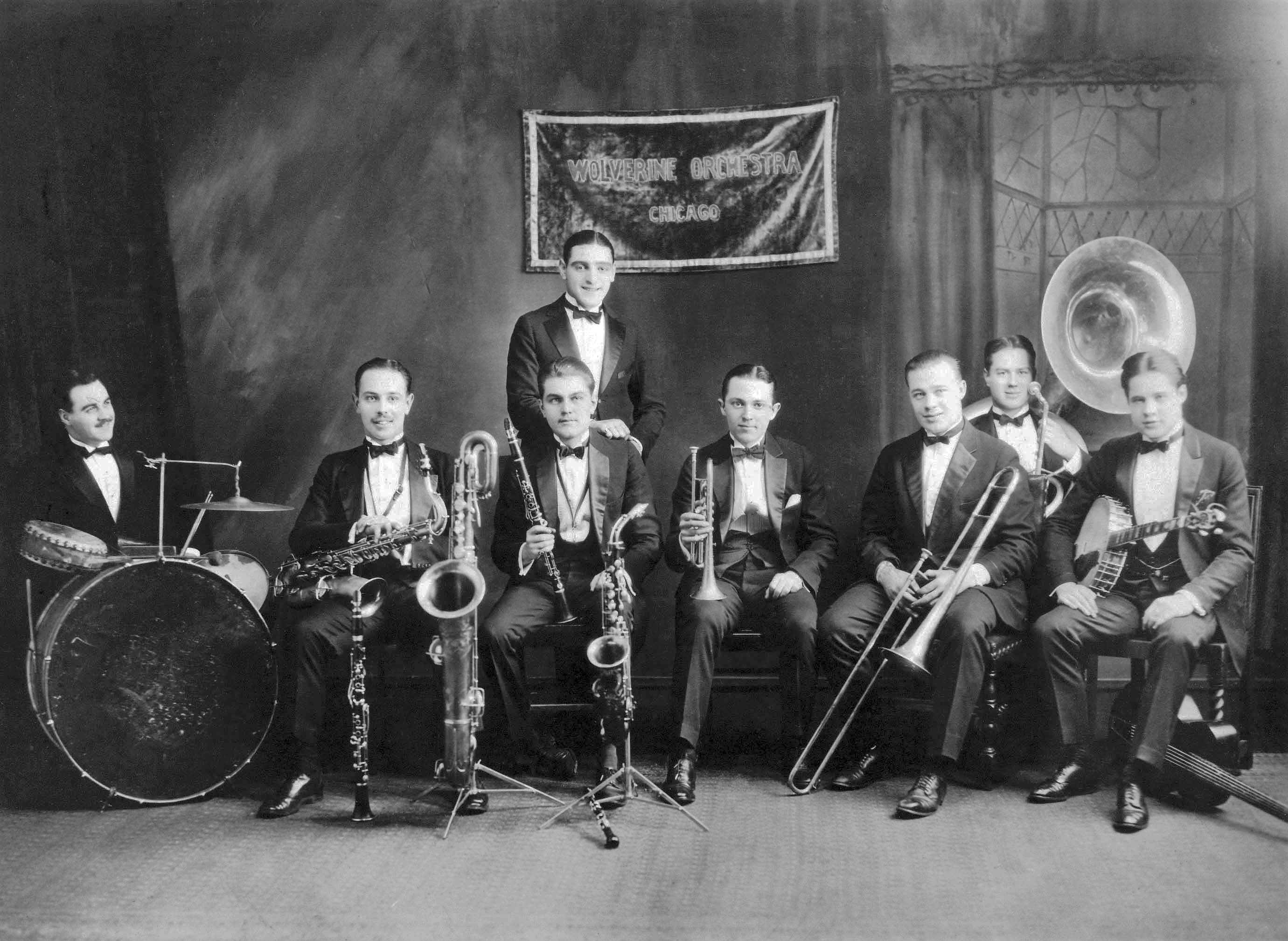
The Wolverines with Beiderbecke at Doyle's Academy of Music in Cincinnati, Ohio, in 1924

Beiderbecke joined the Wolverine Orchestra late in 1923, and the seven-man group first played a speakeasy called the Stockton Club near Hamilton, Ohio. Specializing in hot jazz and recoiling from so-called sweet music, the band took its name from one of its most frequent numbers, Jelly Roll Morton's "Wolverine Blues." During this time, Beiderbecke also took piano lessons from a young woman who introduced him to the works of Eastwood Lane. Lane's piano suites and orchestral arrangements were self-consciously American whilst also having French Impressionist allusions, and influenced Beiderbecke's style, especially on "In a Mist." A subsequent gig at Doyle's Dance Academy in Cincinnati became the occasion for a series of band and individual photographs that resulted in the image of Beiderbecke—sitting fresh-faced, his hair perfectly combed and his cornet resting on his right knee.

On February 18, 1924, the Wolverines made their first recordings. Two sides were waxed that day at the Gennett Records studios in Richmond, Indiana: (Note: For more about Gennett, see Kennedy.) "Fidgety Feet", written by Nick LaRocca and Larry Shields from the Original Dixieland Jazz Band, and "Jazz Me Blues", written by Tom Delaney. Beiderbecke's solo on the latter heralded something new and significant in jazz, according to biographers Richard M. Sudhalter and Philip R. Evans:

Both qualities—complementary or "correlated" phrasing and cultivation of the vocal, "singing" middle-range of the cornet—are on display in Bix's "Jazz Me Blues" solo, along with an already discernible inclination for unusual accidentals and inner chordal voices. It is a pioneer record, introducing a musician of great originality with a pace-setting band. And it astonished even the Wolverines themselves.

The Wolverines recorded 15 sides for Gennett Records between February and October 1924. The titles revealed a strong and well-formed cornet talent. His lip had strengthened from earlier, more tentative years; on nine of the Wolverines' recorded titles he proceeds commandingly from lead to opening solo without any need for a respite from playing.

In some respects, Beiderbecke's playing was sui generis, (Note: The cornetist Rex Stewart described his friend Beiderbecke as "playin' stuff all his own. Didn't sound like Louis [Armstrong] or anybody else") but he nevertheless listened to, and learned from, the music around him: from the Dixieland jazz as exemplified by the Original Dixieland Jazz Band; to the hotter Chicago style of the New Orleans Rhythm Kings and the south-side bands of King Oliver and other black artists; to the classical compositions of Claude Debussy and Maurice Ravel.

Louis Armstrong also provided a source of inspiration, though Beiderbecke's style was very different from that of Armstrong, according to The Oxford Companion to Jazz:

Where Armstrong's playing was bravura, regularly optimistic, and openly emotional, Beiderbecke's conveyed a range of intellectual alternatives. Where Armstrong, at the head of an ensemble, played it hard, straight, and true, Beiderbecke, like a shadowboxer, invented his own way of phrasing "around the lead." Where Armstrong's superior strength delighted in the sheer power of what a cornet could produce, Beiderbecke's cool approach invited rather than commanded you to listen.

Armstrong tended to accentuate showmanship and virtuosity, whereas Beiderbecke emphasized melody, even when improvising, and rarely strayed into the upper reaches of the register. Mezz Mezzrow recounted in his autobiography driving 53 miles to Hudson Lake, Indiana, with Frank Teschemacher in order to play Armstrong's "Heebie Jeebies" for Beiderbecke when it was released. In addition to listening to Armstrong's records, Beiderbecke and other white musicians patronized the Sunset Café on Fridays to listen to Armstrong and his band. Paul Mares of the New Orleans Rhythm Kings insisted that Beiderbecke's chief influence was the New Orleans cornetist Emmett Hardy, who died in 1925 at the age of 23. Indeed, Beiderbecke had met Hardy and the clarinetist Leon Roppolo in Davenport in 1921 when the two joined a local band and played in town for three months. Beiderbecke apparently spent time with them, but it is difficult to discern the degree to which Hardy's style influenced Beiderbecke's—especially since there is no publicly known recording of a Hardy performance.

Beiderbecke certainly found a kindred musical spirit in Hoagy Carmichael, whose amusingly unconventional personality he also appreciated. The two became firm friends. A law student and aspiring pianist and songwriter, Carmichael invited the Wolverines to play at the Bloomington campus of Indiana University in the spring of 1924. On May 6, 1924, the Wolverines recorded a tune Carmichael had written especially for Beiderbecke and his colleagues: "Riverboat Shuffle".

=== Goldkette ===
During an engagement at the Cinderella Ballroom in New York during September–October 1924, Bix tendered his resignation with the Wolverines, (Note: Beiderbecke's replacement in the Wolverines was the 17-year-old Chicagoan Jimmy McPartland, who emulated but generally did not copy Beiderbecke's style. During World War II, McPartland married the English pianist Marian Turner in Germany; Marian McPartland went on to become a jazz great in her own right.) leaving to join Jean Goldkette and his Orchestra in Detroit, but Beiderbecke's tenure with the band proved to be short-lived. Goldkette recorded for the Victor Talking Machine Company, whose musical director, Eddie King, objected to Beiderbecke's modernistic style of jazz playing. Moreover, despite the fact that Beiderbecke's position within the Goldkette band was "third trumpet", a less taxing role than 1st or 2nd trumpet, he struggled with the complex ensemble passages due to his limited reading abilities. After a few weeks, Beiderbecke and Goldkette agreed to part company, but to keep in touch, with Goldkette advising Beiderbecke to brush up on his reading and learn more about music. Some six weeks after leaving the band, Bix arranged a Gennett recording session back in Richmond with some of the Goldkette band members, under the name Bix and His Rhythm Jugglers. On January 26, 1925, they set two tunes to wax: "Toddlin' Blues", another number by LaRocca and Shields, and Beiderbecke's own composition, "Davenport Blues", which subsequently became a classic jazz number, recorded by musicians ranging from Bunny Berigan to Ry Cooder and Geoff Muldaur. An arrangement of "Davenport Blues" as a piano solo was published by Robbins Music in 1927.

In February 1925, Beiderbecke enrolled at the University of Iowa in Iowa City. His stint in academia was even briefer than his time in Detroit, however. When he attempted to pack his course schedule with music, his guidance counselor forced him instead to take religion, ethics, physical education, and military training. It was an institutional blunder that Benny Green described as being, in retrospect, "comical," "fatuous," and "a parody." Beiderbecke promptly began to skip classes, and after he participated in a drunken incident in a local bar, he was expelled. According to Lion, he was not expelled, but quit. That summer he played with his friends Don Murray and Howdy Quicksell at a lake resort in Michigan. The band was run by Goldkette, and it put Beiderbecke in touch with another musician he had met before: the C-melody saxophone player Frankie Trumbauer. The two hit it off, both personally and musically, despite Trumbauer having been warned by other musicians: "Look out, he's trouble. He drinks and you'll have a hard time handling him." They were inseparable for much of the rest of Beiderbecke's career, with Trumbauer acting as something of a guardian to Beiderbecke. When Trumbauer organized a band for an extended run at the Arcadia Ballroom in St. Louis, Beiderbecke joined him. There he also played alongside the clarinetist Pee Wee Russell, who praised Beiderbecke's ability to drive the band. "He more or less made you play whether you wanted to or not," Russell said. "If you had any talent at all he made you play better."

In the spring of 1926, Bix and Trumbauer joined Goldkette's main dance band, splitting the year between playing a Summer season at a Goldkette-owned resort on Lake Hudson, Indiana, and headlining at Detroit's Graystone Ballroom, which was also owned by Goldkette. In October 1926, Goldkette's "Famous Fourteen", as they came to be called, opened at the Roseland Ballroom in New York City opposite the Fletcher Henderson Orchestra, one of the East Coast's outstanding African American big bands. The Roseland promoted a "Battle of the Bands" in the local press and, on October 12, after a night of furious playing, Goldkette's men were declared the winners. "We […] were amazed, angry, morose, and bewildered," Rex Stewart, Fletcher's lead trumpeter, said of listening to Beiderbecke and his colleagues play. He called the experience "most humiliating". On October 15, 1931, a few months after Beiderbecke's death, the Fletcher Henderson Orchestra recorded a version of "Singin' the Blues" that included Rex Stewart performing a nearly note-for-note homage to Beiderbecke's most famous solo.

"Singin' the Blues" (1927)
Beiderbecke's cornet solo in "Singin' the Blues" recorded on February 4, 1927, in New York.

Although the Goldkette Orchestra recorded numerous sides for Victor during this period, none of them showcases Beiderbecke's most famous solos. The band found itself subjected to the commercial considerations of the popular music sector that Victor deliberately targeted the band's recordings at. The few exceptions to the policy include "My Pretty Girl" and "Clementine", the latter being one of the band's final recordings and its effective swan song. In addition to these commercial sessions with Goldkette, Beiderbecke and Trumbauer also recorded under their own names for the OKeh label; Bix waxed some of his best solos as a member of Trumbauer's recording band, starting with "Clarinet Marmalade" and "Singin' the Blues", recorded on February 4, 1927. Again with Trumbauer, Beiderbecke re-recorded Carmichael's "Riverboat Shuffle" in May and delivered two further seminal solos a few days later on "I'm Coming, Virginia" and "Way Down Yonder in New Orleans". Beiderbecke earned co-writing credit with Trumbauer on "For No Reason at All in C", recorded under the name Tram, Bix and Eddie (in their Three Piece Band). Beiderbecke switched between cornet and piano on that number, and then in September played only piano for his recording of "In A Mist". This was perhaps the most fruitful year of his short career. (Note: For complete Beiderbecke discographies, see Sudhalter and Evans; and Lion)

Under financial pressure, Goldkette folded his premier band in September 1927 in New York. (Note: Organizations like the one run by Jean Goldkette often operated multiple bands. During the summer of 1926, for instance, Goldkette split his personnel into two bands, with Beiderbecke, Trumbauer, and company playing Hudson Lake. Goldkette also managed the all-African American McKinney's Cotton Pickers, a band that at one time or another featured Doc Cheatham, Benny Carter, Don Redman, Rex Stewart, Fats Waller, and James P. Johnson.) Paul Whiteman hoped to snatch up Goldkette's best musicians for his traveling orchestra, but Beiderbecke, Trumbauer, Murray, Bill Rank, Chauncey Morehouse, and Frank Signorelli instead joined the bass saxophone player Adrian Rollini at the Club New Yorker. The band also included guitarist Eddie Lang and violinist Joe Venuti, who had often recorded on a freelance basis with the Goldkette Orchestra. Another newcomer was Sylvester Ahola, a schooled trumpeter who could play improvised jazz solos and read complex scores. When Ahola introduced himself, Beiderbecke famously stated "Hell, I'm only a musical degenerate". When that job ended sooner than expected, in October 1927, Beiderbecke and Trumbauer signed on with Whiteman. They joined his orchestra in Indianapolis on October 27.

=== Whiteman ===
The Paul Whiteman Orchestra was the most popular and highest paid dance band of the day. In spite of Whiteman's appellation "The King of Jazz", his band was not a jazz ensemble as such, but a popular music outfit that drew from both jazz and classical music repertoires, according to the demands of its record-buying and concert-going audience. Whiteman was perhaps best known for having premiered George Gershwin's Rhapsody in Blue in New York in 1924, and the orchestrator of that piece, Ferde Grofé, continued to be an important part of the band throughout the 1920s. Whiteman was large physically and important culturally —"a man flabby, virile, quick, coarse, untidy and sleek, with a hard core of shrewdness in an envelope of sentimentalism", according to a 1926 New Yorker profile. (Note: Quoted in Sudhalter, Lost Chords) A number of Beiderbecke partisans have criticised Whiteman for not giving Bix the opportunities he deserved as a jazz musician. (Note: Sudhalter, in Lost Chords, writes of Whiteman as having been cast "a villain" in the Beiderbecke story.) James complains that, after Beiderbecke joined the band, "Whiteman moved farther and farther away from the easy-going, rhythmically inclined style of his earlier days", becoming "more subservient to his business sense". He goes on to suggest that this artistically compromised Beiderbecke, in part causing his death.

Benny Green, in particular, derided Whiteman for being a mere "mediocre vaudeville act", and suggesting that "today we only tolerate the horrors of Whiteman's recordings at all in the hope that here and there a Bixian fragment will redeem the mess." (Note: Green; also quoted in Sudhalter, Lost Chords) Richard Sudhalter has responded by suggesting that Beiderbecke saw the Whiteman band as an opportunity to pursue musical ambitions that did not stop at jazz:

Colleagues have testified that, far from feeling bound or stifled by the Whiteman orchestra, as Green and others have suggested, Bix often felt a sense of exhilaration. It was like attending a music school, learning and broadening: formal music, especially the synthesis of the American vernacular idiom with a more classical orientation, so much sought-after in the 1920s, were calling out to him.

Beiderbecke is featured on a number of Whiteman recordings, including "From Monday On", "Back In Your Own Back Yard", "You Took Advantage Of Me", "Sugar", "Changes" and "When". These feature specially written arrangements that emphasize Beiderbecke's improvisational skills. Bill Challis, an arranger who had also worked in this capacity for Jean Goldkette, was particularly sympathetic in writing scores with Beiderbecke in mind, sometimes arranging entire ensemble passages based on solos that Bix played. Beiderbecke also played on several notable hit records recorded by Whiteman, such as "Together", "Ramona" and "Ol' Man River", the latter featuring Bing Crosby on vocals.

The heavy touring and recording schedule with Whiteman's orchestra may have exacerbated Beiderbecke's long-term alcoholism, though this is a contentious point. Whiteman's violinist Matty Malneck said "The work was so hard, you almost had to drink" (Note: Bix: 'Ain't None of Them Play Like Him Yet' (1981), film documentary, directed and produced by Brigitte Berman.) adding "He didn't get to play the things he loved with the Whiteman band because we were a symphonic band and we played the same thing every night, and it got to be tiresome."

On November 30, 1928, whilst on tour in Cleveland, Beiderbecke suffered what Lion terms "a severe nervous crisis" and Sudhalter and Evans suggest "was in all probability an acute attack of delirium tremens", presumably triggered by Beiderbecke's attempt to curb his alcohol intake. "He cracked up, that's all", trombonist Bill Rank said. "Just went to pieces; broke up a roomful of furniture in the hotel."

In February 1929, Beiderbecke returned home to Davenport to convalesce and was hailed by the local press as "the world's hottest cornetist". He then spent the summer with Whiteman's band in Hollywood in preparation for the shooting of a new talking picture, The King of Jazz. Production delays prevented any real work from being done on the film, leaving Beiderbecke and his pals plenty of time to drink heavily. By September, he was back in Davenport, where his parents helped him to seek treatment. He spent a month, from October 14 until November 18, at the Keeley Institute in Dwight, Illinois. According to Lion, an examination by Keeley physicians confirmed the damaging effects of Beiderbecke's long-term reliance on alcohol: "Bix admitted to having used liquor 'in excess' for the past nine years, his daily dose over the last three years amounting to three pints of 'whiskey' and twenty cigarettes.....A Hepatic dullness was obvious, 'knee jerk could not be obtained' – which confirmed the spread of the polyneuritis, and Bix was 'swaying in Romberg position' – standing up with his eyes closed".

While he was away, Whiteman famously kept his chair open in Beiderbecke's honor, in the hope that he would occupy it again. However, when he returned to New York at the end of January 1930, Beiderbecke did not rejoin Whiteman and performed only sparingly. On his last recording session, in New York, on September 15, 1930, Beiderbecke played on the original recording of Hoagy Carmichael's new song, "Georgia on My Mind", with Carmichael doing the vocals, Eddie Lang on guitar, Joe Venuti on violin, Jimmy Dorsey on clarinet and alto saxophone, Jack Teagarden on trombone, and Bud Freeman on tenor saxophone. The song would go on to become a jazz and popular music standard. In 2014, the 1930 recording of "Georgia on My Mind" was inducted into the Grammy Hall of Fame.

Beiderbecke's playing had an influence on Carmichael as a composer. One of his compositions, "Stardust", was inspired by Beiderbecke's improvisations, with a cornet phrase reworked by Carmichael into the song's central theme. (Note: In his Carmichael biography, Sudhalter actually charts the similarities between recorded Beiderbecke solos in "Singin' the Blues", "Jazz Me Blues", and "Star Dust", writing: "The high spot of 'Star Dust's' first recorded performance is Hoagy's own full-chorus piano solo, its chordal devices clearly echoing Bix's fascination with the Impressionists and such 'moderns' as Igor Stravinsky—and his admiration for the now almost forgotten American composer Eastwood Lane.") Bing Crosby, who sang with Whiteman, also cited Beiderbecke as an important influence. "Bix and all the rest would play and exchange ideas on the piano", he said.

With all the noise [of a New York pub] going on, I don't know how they heard themselves, but they did. I didn't contribute anything, but I listened and learned […] I was now being influenced by these musicians, particularly horn men. I could hum and sing all of the jazz choruses from the recordings made by Bix, Phil Napoleon, and the rest.

Following the Wall Street Crash of 1929, the once-booming music industry contracted and work became more difficult to find. For a while, Beiderbecke's only regular income came from his work as a member of Nat Shilkret's orchestra on The Camel Pleasure Hour NBC radio show. However, during a live broadcast on October 8, 1930, Beiderbecke's seemingly limitless gift for improvisation finally failed him: "He stood up to take his solo, but his mind went blank and nothing happened", recalled a fellow musician, Frankie Cush. The cornetist spent the rest of the year at home in Davenport and then, in February 1931, he returned to New York one last time.

== Personal life ==
The most substantial of Beiderbecke's documented romantic relationships was with Ruth Shaffner, a medical secretary whom he met at the Arcadia Ballroom in St. Louis in September 1925 and saw through the following winter; Trumbauer later described her as "the only girl that he ever loved". Sudhalter and Evans, drawing on their interviews with Shaffner herself, wrote that she had become pregnant by Beiderbecke late in 1925 and that he offered to marry her, but that Shaffner, the daughter of a strict churchgoing family, broke off the relationship rather than marry, though how the pregnancy ended is not known.

In a letter to his parents dated June 16, 1931, weeks before his death, Beiderbecke wrote that he intended to marry Alice O'Connell, a 20-year-old New York woman of Irish-Catholic background. Lion characterised this as "probably more fantasy than reality", observing that the same letter contained other apparent inventions meant to reassure his parents about his circumstances, and that the woman was never afterward identified with certainty.

== Death ==
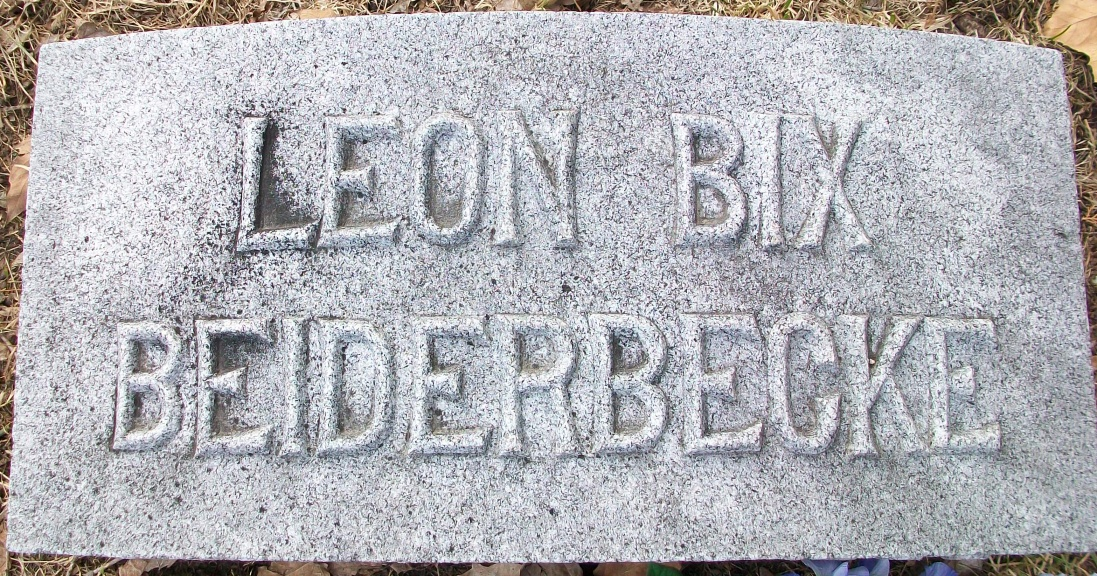
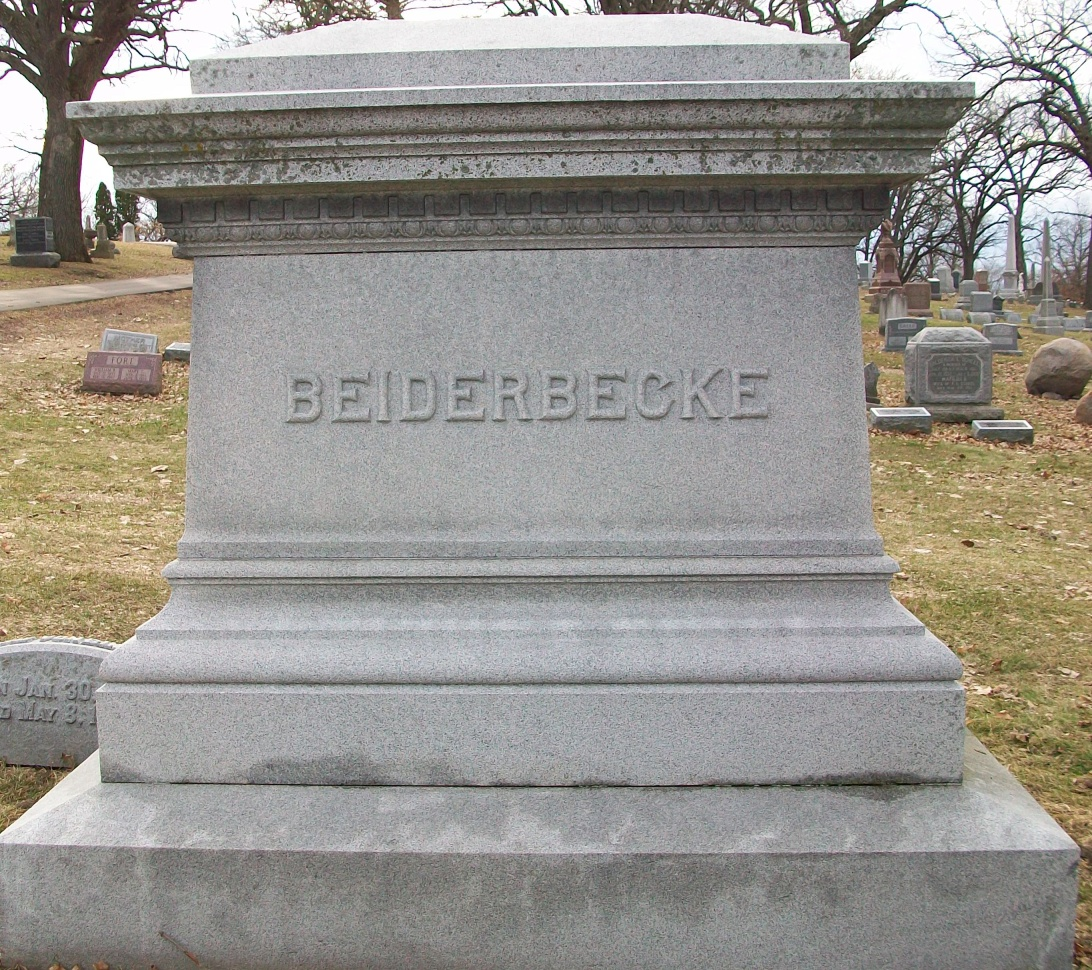
Bix Beiderbecke's grave (left) is positioned near the Beiderbecke family marker (right) at Oakdale Cemetery in Davenport, Iowa. Beiderbecke, who died on August 6, 1931, in New York, was buried in his hometown five days later, with only immediate family members present.

Beiderbecke died in his apartment, No. 1G, 43–30 46th Street, in Sunnyside, Queens, New York, on August 6, 1931. The week had been stiflingly hot, making sleep difficult. Suffering from insomnia, Beiderbecke played the piano late into the evenings, to both the annoyance and the delight of his neighbors. On the evening of August 6, at about 9:30 pm, his rental agent, George Kraslow, heard noises coming from across the hallway. "His hysterical shouts brought me to his apartment on the run," Kraslow told Philip Evans in 1959, continuing:

He pulled me in and pointed to the bed. His whole body was trembling violently. He was screaming there were two Mexicans hiding under his bed with long daggers. To humor him, I looked under the bed and when I rose to assure him there was no one hiding there, he staggered and fell, a dead weight, in my arms. I ran across the hall and called in a woman doctor, Dr. Haberski, to examine him. She pronounced him dead.

Historians have disagreed over the identity of the doctor who pronounced Beiderbecke dead, with several sources stating that it was John Haberski (the husband of the woman Kraslow identified) who pronounced Beiderbecke dead in his apartment. (Note: Berton identifies the doctor as Dr. Haberski and (alone among Beiderbecke commentators) has Beiderbecke dying in Queens General Hospital. Sudhalter and Evans identify the doctor as John James Haberski, Beiderbecke's across-the-hall neighbor. Lion calls him Dr. John H. Haberski, while George Kraslow referred to Haberski as a woman.) The official cause of death, as indicated on the death certificate, was lobar pneumonia. Unofficially, edema of the brain, coupled with the effects of long-term alcoholism, have been cited as contributory factors. (Note: See Spencer, for an in-depth discussion of Beiderbecke's cause of death, informed by both medicine and history.) Beiderbecke's mother and brother took the train to New York and arranged for his body to be taken home to Davenport. He was buried there on August 11, 1931, in the family plot at Oakdale Cemetery.

== Legend and legacy ==
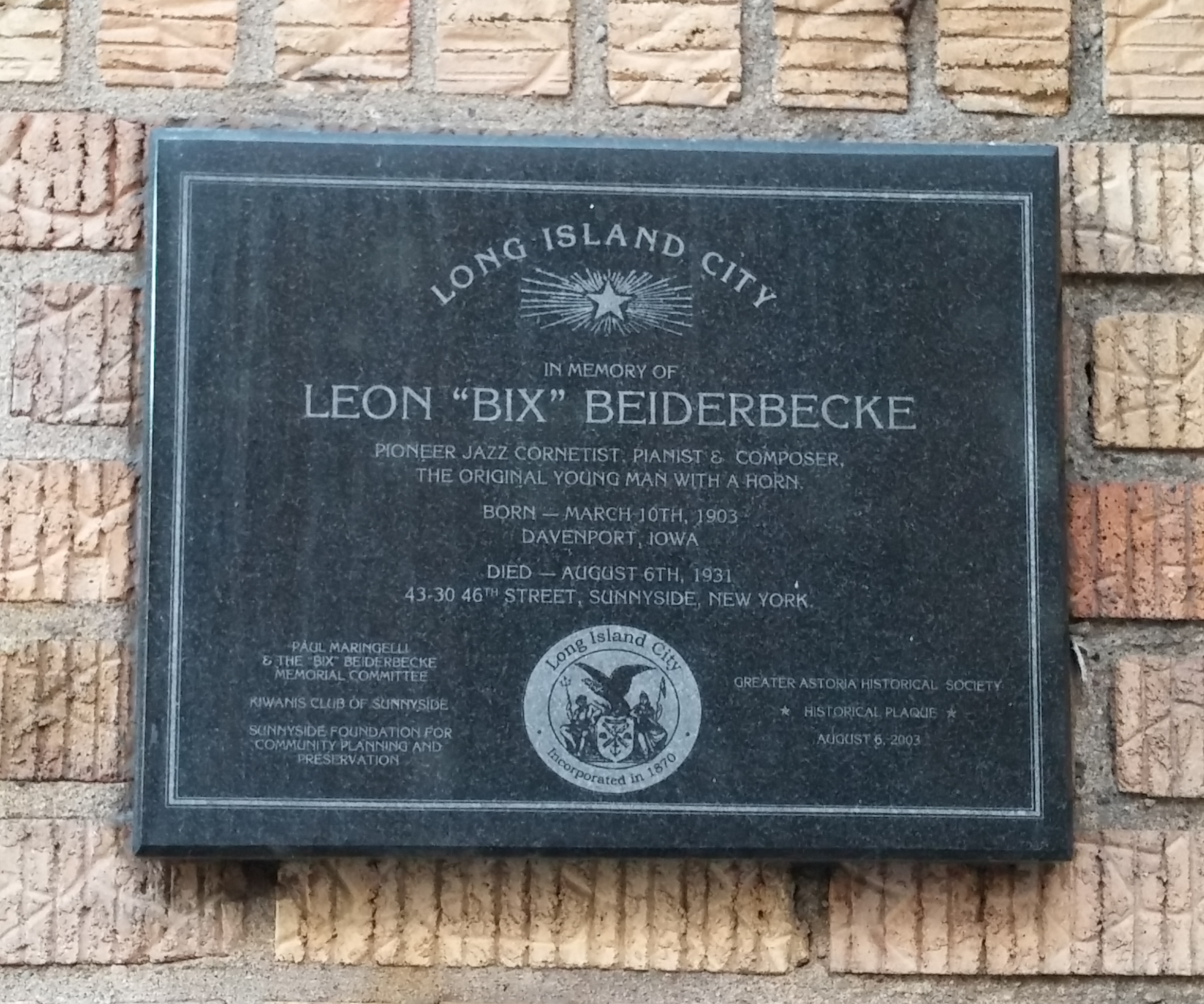
Plaque in Sunnyside, N.Y., where the jazz musician Bix Beiderbecke died.

Critical analysis of Beiderbecke's work during his lifetime was sparse. His innovative playing initially received greater attention and appreciation among European critics than those in the country of his birth. The British music trade magazine Melody Maker published a number of reviews of his recordings and assessments of his cornet playing. In the April 1927 issue, bandleader Fred Elizalde stated: "Bix Bidlebeck (sic) is considered by Red Nichols himself and every other trumpet player in the States, for that matter, as the greatest trumpet player of all time". The magazine's editor, Edgar Jackson, was equally fulsome in his praise: "Bix has a heart as big as your head, which shines through his playing with the warmth of the sun's rays" (September 1927 issue); "The next sixteen bars are a trumpet solo by Bix, and if this doesn't get you right in the heart, you'd better see a vet…."

At the time of his death, Beiderbecke was still little known by the public at large, though his appreciation among fellow musicians and the collegiate set is indicated by contemporary news reports:

To a large circle of those boys and girls of high school and college age whom a staid world likes to label "the jazz-mad generation," the news that Leon Bix Beiderbecke is dead will mean something, however lacking in significance it might be to their critical elders. "Bixie" was a symbol of that jazz generation, expressing its wistful, restless temperament through the medium of the unconventional dance music which constitutes its theme song. In his mind were conceived the wild, strange contortions of rhythm and harmony which established the basic motif of the popular music of a year ago.

....To most youngsters in college, however, the weird flourishes that "Bixie's" fingers executed on trumpet and piano were expressive. They could hear the lilting melody of youth that formed a smooth background for his fantastic caricatures in sound. Hundreds of young collegians who couldn't recall a strain of Beethoven or Wagner could whistle Bix Beiderbecke choruses. In the world of professional popular music, "Bixie" was an artist comparable to Kreisler in the field of conventional music. Paul Whiteman called him "the finest trumpet player in the country".

Perhaps "Bixie's" death at the age of twenty-eight also is symbolical of the futility of the "jazz-mad generation's" quest for self-expression. However that may be, if it is true, as some critics contend, that "jazz" music is establishing foundations on which a distinctive and thoroughly legitimate American music eventually will be built, Bix Beiderbecke has left his mark on the future culture of the nation.

One of the first serious, analytical obituaries to have been published in the months after his death was by the French jazz writer Hugues Panassié. The notice appeared in October 1931.

The New Republic critic Otis Ferguson wrote two short articles for the magazine, "Young Man with a Horn" and "Young Man with a Horn Again", that worked to revive interest not only in Beiderbecke's music but also in his biography. Beiderbecke "lived very briefly […] in what might be called the servants' entrance to art", Ferguson wrote. "His story is a good story, quite humble and right." The romantic notion of the short-lived, doomed jazz genius can be traced back at least as far as Beiderbecke, and lived on in Glenn Miller, Charlie Parker, Billie Holiday, Jaco Pastorius and many more.

Ferguson's sense of what was "right" became the basis for the Beiderbecke Romantic legend, which has traditionally emphasized the musician's Iowa roots, his often careless dress, his difficulty sight reading, the purity of his tone, his drinking, and his early death. These themes were repeated by Beiderbecke's friends in various memoirs, including The Stardust Road (1946) and Sometimes I Wonder (1965) by Hoagy Carmichael, Really the Blues (1946) by Mezz Mezzrow, and We Called It Music (1947) by Eddie Condon. Beiderbecke was portrayed as a tragic genius along the lines of Ludwig van Beethoven. "For his talent there were no conservatories to get stuffy in, no high-trumpet didoes to be learned doggedly, note-perfect as written," Ferguson wrote, "because in his chosen form the only writing of any account was traced in the close shouting air of Royal Gardens, Grand Pavilions, honkeytonks, etc." He was "this big overgrown kid, who looked like he'd been snatched out of a cradle in the cornfields", Mezzrow wrote. "The guy didn't have an enemy in the world," recalled fellow musician Russ Morgan, "[b]ut he was out of this world most of the time." [Italics in original.] According to Ralph Berton, he was "as usual gazing off into his private astronomy", but his cornet, Condon famously quipped, sounded "like a girl saying yes".

In 1938, Dorothy Baker borrowed the title of her friend Otis Ferguson's first article and published the novel Young Man with a Horn. Her story of the doomed trumpet player Rick Martin was inspired, she wrote, by "the music, but not the life" of Beiderbecke, but the image of Martin quickly became the image of Beiderbecke: his story is about "the gap between the man's musical ability and his ability to fit it to his own life." In 1950, Michael Curtiz directed the film Young Man with a Horn, starring Kirk Douglas, Lauren Bacall, and Doris Day. In this version, in which Hoagy Carmichael also plays a role, the Rick Martin character lives.

In Blackboard Jungle, a 1955 film starring Glenn Ford and Sidney Poitier, Beiderbecke's music is briefly featured, but as a symbol of cultural conservatism in a nation on the cusp of the rock and roll revolution.

Brendan Wolfe, the author of Finding Bix, spoke of Beiderbecke's lasting influence on Davenport, Iowa: "His name and face are still a huge part of the city's identity. There's an annual Bix Beiderbecke Memorial Jazz Festival, and a Bix 7 road race with tens of thousands of runners, Bix T-shirts, bumper stickers, bobble-head dolls, the whole works." In 1971, on the 40th anniversary of Beiderbecke's death, the Bix Beiderbecke Memorial Jazz Festival was founded in Davenport, Iowa, to honor the musician. In 1974, Sudhalter and Evans published their biography, Bix: Man and Legend, which was nominated for a National Book Award. In 1977, the Beiderbecke childhood home at 1934 Grand Avenue in Davenport was added to the National Register of Historic Places. A dance piece by Twyla Tharp was created in 1971 to music by Bix Biederbecke with The Paul Whiteman Orchestra. Originally titled "True Confessions", it was later named "The Bix Pieces."

The documentary Bix: Ain't None of Them Play Like Him Yet, directed and produced by Brigitte Berman, was released in 1981 and featured interviews with Hoagy Carmichael, Bill Challis, and others who knew and worked with Beiderbecke. Beiderbecke's music was featured in three British comedy drama television series, all written by Alan Plater: The Beiderbecke Affair (1984), The Beiderbecke Tapes (1987), and The Beiderbecke Connection (1988). In 1991, the Italian director Pupi Avati released Bix: An Interpretation of a Legend. Filmed partially in the Beiderbecke home, which Avati had purchased and renovated, Bix was screened at the Cannes Film Festival.

At the beginning of the 21st century, Beiderbecke's music continued to reside mostly out of the mainstream and some of the facts of his life are still debated, but scholars largely agree — due in part to the influence of Sudhalter and Evans — that he was an important innovator in early jazz; jazz cornetists, including Sudhalter (who died in 2008), and Tom Pletcher, closely emulate his style. In 2003, to mark the hundredth anniversary of his birth, the Greater Astoria Historical Society and other community organizations, spearheaded by Paul Maringelli and The Bix Beiderbecke Sunnyside Memorial Committee, erected a plaque in Beiderbecke's honor at the apartment building in which he died in Queens. That same year, Frederick Turner published his novel 1929, which followed the facts of Beiderbecke's life fairly closely, focusing on his summer in Hollywood and featuring appearances by Al Capone and Clara Bow. The critic and musician Digby Fairweather sums up Beiderbecke's musical legacy, arguing that "with Louis Armstrong, Bix Beiderbecke was the most striking of jazz's cornet (and of course, trumpet) fathers; a player who first captivated his 1920s generation and after his premature death, founded a dynasty of distinguished followers beginning with Jimmy McPartland and moving on down from there."

== Music ==
=== Style and influence ===
In New Orleans, jazz had traditionally been expressed through polyphonic ensemble playing, with the various instruments weaving their parts into a single and coherent aural tapestry. By the early 1920s, developments in jazz saw the rise of the jazz soloist, with solos becoming longer and more complex. Both Beiderbecke and Armstrong were key figures in this evolution, as can be heard on their earliest recordings. According to the critic Terry Teachout, they are "the two most influential figures in the early history of jazz" and "the twin lines of descent from which most of today's jazz can be traced." (Note: Teachout, Homage to Bix See also Teachout, Pops.)

Beiderbecke's cornet style is often described by contrasting it with Armstrong's markedly different approach. Armstrong was a virtuoso on his instrument, and his solos often took advantage of that fact. Beiderbecke was largely, although not completely, self-taught, and the constraints imposed by that fact were evident in his music. While Armstrong often soared into the upper register, Beiderbecke stayed in the middle range, more interested in exploring the melody and harmonies than in dazzling the audience. Armstrong often emphasized the performance aspect of his playing, while Beiderbecke tended to stare at his feet while playing, uninterested in personally engaging his listeners. Armstrong was deeply influenced by the blues, while Beiderbecke was influenced as much by modernist composers such as Debussy and Ravel as by his fellow jazzmen. (Note: For the blues influence on Armstrong, see Brothers , especially Chapter 7, "Ragtime and Buddy Bolden". For Bix's listening, see Lion, pp. 78–79.)

Beiderbecke's most famous solo was on "Singin' the Blues", recorded February 4, 1927. It has been hailed as an important example of the "jazz ballad style"—"a slow or medium-tempo piece played gently and sweetly, but not cloyingly, with no loss of muscle." The tune's laid-back emotions hinted at what would become, in the 1950s, the cool jazz style, personified by Chet Baker and Bill Evans. More than that, though, "Singin' the Blues" has been noted for the way its improvisations feel less improvised than composed, with each phrase building on the last in a logical fashion. Benny Green describes the solo's effect on practiced ears:

When a musician hears Bix's solo on 'Singing the Blues', he becomes aware after two bars that the soloist knows exactly what he is doing and that he has an exquisite sense of discord and resolution. He knows also that this player is endowed with the rarest jazz gift of all, a sense of form which lends to an improvised performance a coherence which no amount of teaching can produce. The listening musician, whatever his generation or his style, recognizes Bix as a modern, modernism being not a style but an attitude.

Like Green, who made particular mention of Beiderbecke's "amount of teaching," the jazz historian Ted Gioia also has emphasized Beiderbecke's lack of formal instruction, suggesting that it caused him to adopt "an unusual, dry embouchure" and "unconventional fingerings," which he retained for the rest of his life. Gioia points to "a characteristic streak of obstinacy" in Beiderbecke that provokes "this chronic disregard of the tried-and-true." He argues that this stubbornness was behind Beiderbecke's decision not to switch from cornet to trumpet when many other musicians, including Armstrong, did so. In addition, Gioia highlights Beiderbecke's precise timing, relaxed delivery, and pure tone, which contrasted with "the dirty, rough-edged sound" of King Oliver and his protégé Armstrong, whose playing was often more energetic and whose style held more sway early in the 1920s than Beiderbecke's.

Beiderbecke's playing – both as a cornetist and a pianist – had a profound effect on a number of his contemporaries. Eddie Condon, for instance, described Beiderbecke's cornet playing as "like a girl saying yes" and also wrote of being amazed by Beiderbecke's piano playing: "All my life I had been listening to music […] But I had never heard anything remotely like what Beiderbecke played. For the first time I realized music isn't all the same, it had become an entirely new set of sounds" (Note: Condon quoted in Berton.) "I tried to explain Bix to the gang," Hoagy Carmichael wrote, but "[i]t was no good, like the telling of a vivid, personal dream […] the emotion couldn't be transmitted." (Note: Carmichael quoted in Berton.)

Mezz Mezzrow described Beiderbecke's tone as being "pickled in alcohol […] I have never heard a tone like he got before or since. He played mostly open horn, every note full, big, rich and round, standing out like a pearl, loud but never irritating or jangling, with a powerful drive that few white musicians had in those days." (Note: Mezzrow quoted in Gioia.)

Some critics have highlighted "Jazz Me Blues", recorded with the Wolverines on February 18, 1924, as being particularly important to understanding Beiderbecke's style. Although it was one of his earliest recordings, the hallmarks of his playing are evident. "The overall impression we get from this solo, as in all of Bix at his best," writes the trumpeter Randy Sandke, "is that every note is spontaneous yet inevitable." (Note: Quote in Lion.) Richard Hadlock describes Beiderbecke's contribution to "Jazz Me Blues" as "an ordered solo that seems more inspired by clarinetists Larry Shields of the ODJB and Leon Roppolo of the NORK than by other trumpet players." He goes on to suggest that clarinetists, by virtue of their not being tied to the melody as much as cornetists and trumpet players, could explore harmonies.

"Jazz Me Blues" was also important because it introduced what has been called the "correlated chorus", a method of improvising that Beiderbecke's Davenport friend Esten Spurrier attributed to both Beiderbecke and Armstrong. "Louis departed greatly from all cornet players in his ability to compose a close-knit individual 32 measures with all phrases compatible with each other", Spurrier told the biographers Sudhalter and Evans, "so Bix and I always credited Louis as being the father of the correlated chorus: play two measures, then two related, making four measures, on which you played another four measures related to the first four, and so on ad infinitum to the end of the chorus. So the secret was simple—a series of related phrases."

Beiderbecke plays piano on his recordings "Big Boy" (October 8, 1924), "For No Reason at All in C" (May 13, 1927), "Wringin' and Twistin'" (September 17, 1927)—all with ensembles—and his only solo recorded work, "In a Mist" (September 9, 1927). Critic Frank Murphy argues that many of the same characteristics that mark Beiderbecke on the cornet are also reflected in his piano playing: the uncharacteristic fingering, the emphasis on inventive harmonies, and the correlated choruses. Those inventive harmonies, on both cornet and piano, pointed the way to future developments in jazz, particularly bebop.

=== Compositions ===
Bix Beiderbecke wrote or co-wrote six instrumental compositions during his career:

- "Davenport Blues" (1925)
- "In a Mist (Bixology)" (1927)
- "For No Reason at All in C" (1927) with Frank Trumbauer
- "Candlelights" (1930)
- "Flashes" (1931)
- "In the Dark" (1931)

"Candlelights", "Flashes", and "In the Dark" are piano compositions transcribed with the help of Bill Challis but never recorded by Beiderbecke. Two additional compositions were attributed to him by two other jazz composers: "Betcha I Getcha", attributed to Beiderbecke as a co-composer by Joe Venuti, the composer of the song, and "Cloudy", attributed to Beiderbecke by composer Charlie Davis as a composition from circa 1924.

=== Major recordings ===
Copenhagen
Recorded on May 6, 1924, and released as Gennett 5453B and Claxtonola 40336B, duration is 2:31

Bix Beiderbecke's first recordings were as a member of the Wolverine Orchestra

- "Fidgety Feet" / "Jazz Me Blues", recorded on February 18, 1924, in Richmond, Indiana, and released as Gennett 5408
- "Copenhagen", recorded on May 6, 1924, and released as Gennett 5453B and Claxtonola 40336B
- "Riverboat Shuffle" / "Susie (Of the Islands)", recorded on May 6, 1924, and released as Gennett 5454

As Bix Beiderbecke and his Rhythm Jugglers

- "Toddlin' Blues" / "Davenport Blues", recorded on January 26, 1925, in Richmond, Indiana, and released as Gennett 5654

With the Jean Goldkette Orchestra in 1926–27

- "Sunday", recorded on October 15, 1926, in New York and released as Victor 20273
- "My Pretty Girl" / "Cover Me Up with Sunshine", recorded on February 1, 1927, in New York and released as Victor 20588
- "Sunny Disposish", recorded on February 3, 1927, in New York and released as Victor 20493B
- "Clementine", recorded on September 15, 1927, in New York and released as Victor 20994 "Jean Goldkette and his Orchestra".

With Frankie Trumbauer and His Orchestra and guitarist Eddie Lang

- "Clarinet Marmalade" / "Singin' the Blues", recorded on February 4, 1927, in New York and released as Okeh 40772
- "Riverboat Shuffle" / "Ostrich Walk", recorded on May 9, 1927, in New York and released as Okeh 40822
- "I'm Coming, Virginia" / "Way Down Yonder in New Orleans", recorded on May 13, 1927, in New York and released as Okeh 40843
- "For No Reason at All in C" / "Trumbology", recorded on May 13, 1927, in New York and released as Okeh 40871, Columbia 35667, and Parlophone R 3419
- "In a Mist" (recorded September 9, 1927) / "Wringin' an' Twistin'" (recorded September 17, 1927), in New York and released as Okeh 40916 and Vocalion 3150
- "Borneo" / "My Pet", recorded on April 10, 1928, in New York and released as Okeh 41039

As Bix Beiderbecke and His Gang

- "At the Jazz Band Ball" / "Jazz Me Blues", recorded on October 5, 1927, in New York and released as Okeh 40923
- "Royal Garden Blues" / "Goose Pimples", recorded on October 5, 1927, in New York and released as Okeh 8544
- "Sorry" / "Since My Best Gal Turned Me Down", recorded on October 25, 1927, in New York and released as Okeh 41001
- "Wa-Da-Da (Everybody's Doin' It Now)", recorded on July 7, 1928, in Chicago, Illinois, and released as Okeh 41088
- "Rhythm King", recorded on September 21, 1928, in New York and released as Okeh 41173

With the Paul Whiteman Orchestra

- "Washboard Blues", recorded on November 18, 1927, in Chicago and released as Victor 35877
- "Changes" [Take 2], recorded on November 23, 1927, in Chicago and released as Victor 25370
- "Lonely Melody" [Take 3] / "Mississippi Mud" [Take 2], with Bing Crosby, the Rhythm Boys, and Izzy Friedman, recorded on January 4, 1928, in New York and released as Victor 25366
- "Ramona", recorded on January 4, 1928, in New York and released as Victor 21214-A. No. 1 for 3 weeks
- "Ol' Man River" (From Show Boat), recorded on January 11, 1928, in New York and released as Victor 21218-A and Victor 25249 with Bing Crosby on vocals. No. 1 for 1 week
- "San" [Take 6], recorded on January 12, 1928, in New York and released as Victor 24078-A
- "Together", recorded on January 21, 1928, in New York and released as Victor 35883-A. No. 1 for 2 weeks
- "Back in Your Own Back Yard" [Take 3], recorded on January 28, 1928, in Camden, New Jersey, and released as Victor 21240
- "There Ain't No Sweet Man That's Worth the Salt of My Tears" [Take 3], recorded on February 8, 1928, in New York and released as Victor 21464
- "Mississippi Mud" [Take 3] / "From Monday On" [Take 6], with vocals by Bing Crosby, recorded on February 28, 1928, in New York and released as Victor 21274
- "My Angel", recorded on April 21, 1928, in New York and released as Victor 21388-A. No. 1 for 6 weeks
- "Louisiana" [Take 1], recorded on April 23, 1928, in New York and released as Victor 21438
- "My Melancholy Baby", recorded on May 15, 1928, in New York and released as Columbia 50068-D
- "Tain't So, Honey, 'Tain't So", recorded on June 10, 1928, in New York and released as Columbia 1444-D
- "Because My Baby Don't Mean "Maybe" Now", recorded on June 18, 1928, in New York and released as Columbia 1441-D
- "Sweet Sue", recorded on September 18, 1928, in New York and released as Columbia 50103-D
- "China Boy", recorded on May 3, 1929, in New York and released as Columbia 1945-D
- "Oh! Miss Hannah", recorded on May 4, 1929, in New York and released as Columbia 1945-D

As Bix Beiderbecke and His Orchestra

- "I Don't Mind Walking in the Rain" / "I'll Be a Friend with Pleasure", recorded on September 8, 1930, in New York and released as Victor 23008

With Hoagy Carmichael and His Orchestra

- "Barnacle Bill, the Sailor" / "Rockin' Chair", with vocals by Carson Robison, recorded on May 21, 1930, in New York and released as Victor V-38139 and Victor 25371
- "Georgia on My Mind", with Hoagy Carmichael on vocals, recorded on September 15, 1930, in New York and released as Victor 23013

== Grammy Hall of Fame ==
Bix Beiderbecke was posthumously inducted into the Grammy Hall of Fame, which is a special Grammy award established in 1973 to honor recordings that are at least 25 years old and that have "qualitative or historical significance."

Bix Beiderbecke: Grammy Hall of Fame Awards
Year Recorded	Title	Genre	Label	Year Inducted	Notes
1927	"Singin' the Blues"	Jazz (single)	Okeh	1977	
1927	"In a Mist"	Jazz (single)	Okeh	1980	
1930	"Georgia on My Mind"	Single	Victor	2014	By Hoagy Carmichael and His Orchestra

== Honors ==
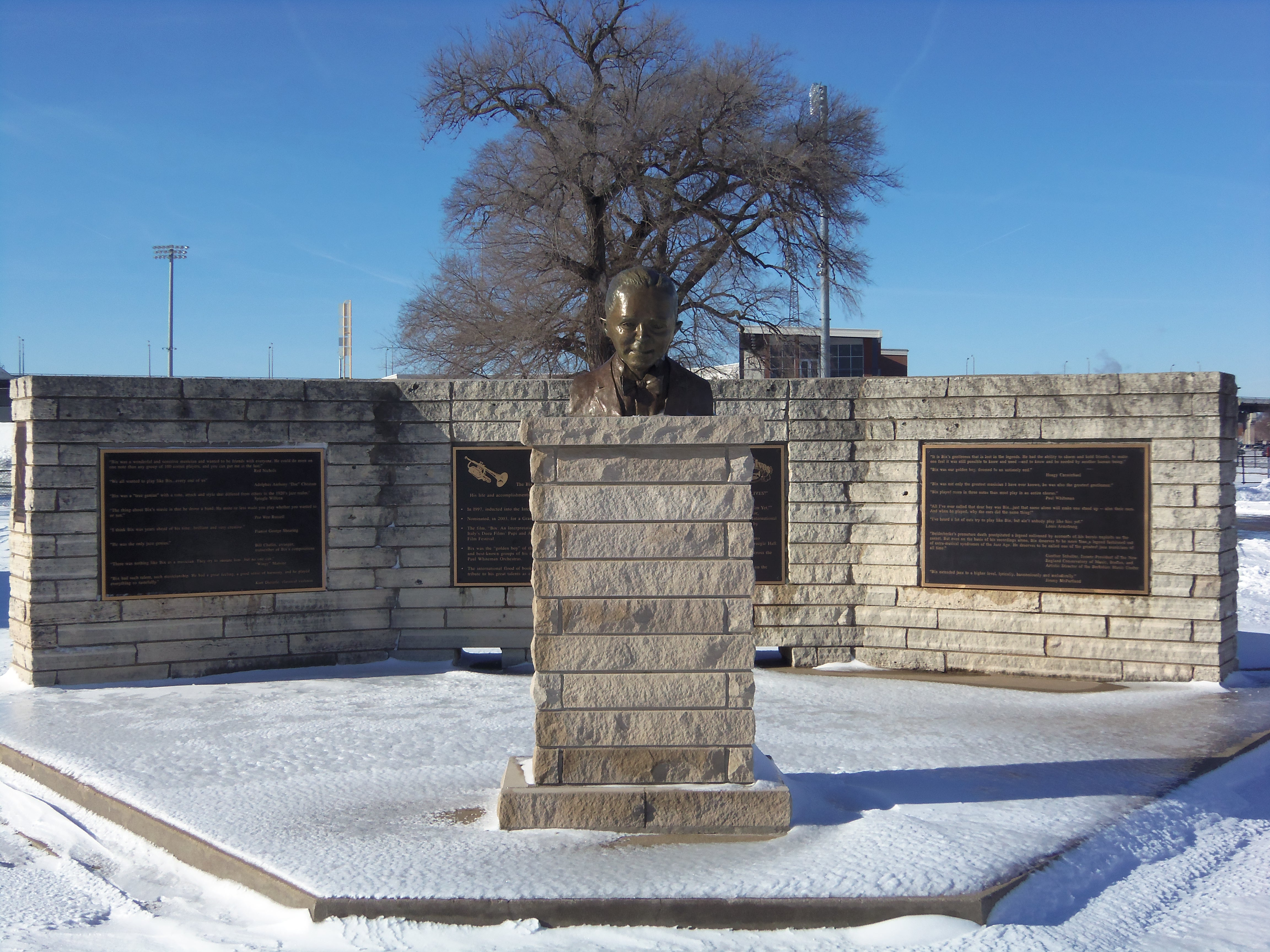
Bix Beiderbecke Memorial in LeClaire Park, Davenport, Iowa

- 1962, inducted into Down Beat's Jazz Hall of Fame, critics' poll
- 1971, Bix Beiderbecke Memorial Society established in Davenport, Iowa; founded annual jazz festival and scholarship
- 1977, Beiderbecke's 1927 recording of "Singin' the Blues" inducted into the Grammy Hall of Fame
- 1979, statue presented at LeClaire Park, in Davenport, Iowa
- 1979, inducted into the Big Band and Jazz Hall of Fame
- 1980, Beiderbecke's 1927 recording of "In a Mist" inducted into the Grammy Hall of Fame
- 1989, Asteroid 23457 Beiderbecke named after him.
- 1993, inducted into the International Academy of Jazz Hall of Fame
- 2000, statue dedicated in Davenport
- 2000, ASCAP Jazz Wall of Fame
- 2004, inducted into the inaugural class of the Lincoln Center's Nesuhi Ertegun Jazz Hall of Fame
- 2006, the 1927 recording of "Singin' the Blues" with Frankie Trumbauer and Eddie Lang was placed on the U.S. Library of Congress National Recording Registry.
- 2007, inducted into the Gennett Records Walk of Fame in Richmond, Indiana.
- 2014, the 1930 recording of "Georgia on My Mind" by Hoagy Carmichael and His Orchestra, featuring Beiderbecke on cornet, inducted into the Grammy Hall of Fame
- 2017, the Bix Beiderbecke Museum & Archives opens in Bix's hometown of Davenport, Iowa
- 2021, featured in the Walt Disney EPCOT "The Soul of Jazz: An American Adventure" exhibition, which displayed his cornet.

== See also ==
- The Beiderbecke Trilogy, a three-part 1980s British (Yorkshire Television) television series (The Beiderbecke Affair, The Beiderbecke Tapes and The Beiderbecke Connection) with a jazz soundtrack in the Beiderbecke style performed by Frank Ricotti and cornetist Kenny Baker, as the hero is a Beiderbecke fan.
