= List of jazz violinists =

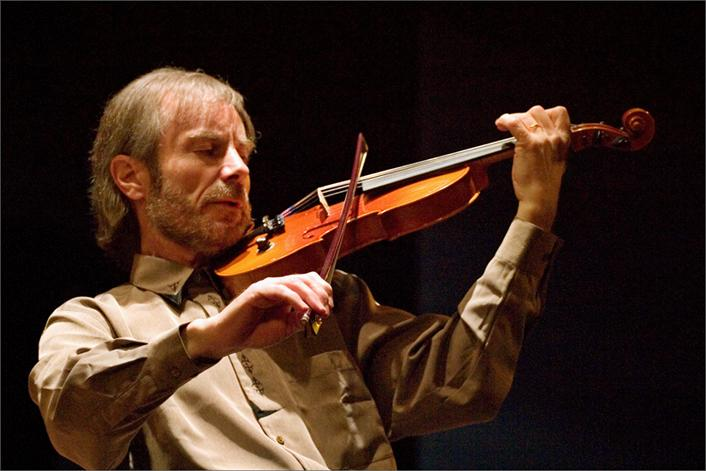
French violinist Jean-Luc Ponty is a jazz-rock fusion performer

This is a list of jazz violinists who have become notable. Jazz violin is the use of the violin or electric violin to improvise solo lines. The earliest references to jazz performance using the violin as a solo instrument was during the first decades of the 20th century. Early jazz violinists included Eddie South, who played violin with Jimmy Wade's Dixielanders in Chicago; Stuff Smith; Claude "Fiddler" Williams, who played with Andy Kirk and his Twelve Clouds of Joy. Joe Venuti was best known for his work with guitarist Eddie Lang during the 1920s. Georgie Stoll was a jazz violinist who became an orchestra leader and film music director.

Since that time there have been many superb improvising violinists including Noel Pointer, Stéphane Grappelli, and Jean-Luc Ponty. While not primarily jazz violinists, Darol Anger, Adam Taubitz and Mark O'Connor have spent significant parts of their careers playing jazz, while emerging artists Scott Tixier and Jeremy Kittel have devoted themselves almost exclusively to jazz both modern and traditional. Violins also appear in string ensembles or big bands supplying orchestral backgrounds to many jazz recordings. Lately, extensive academic research on jazz violin has been conducted and published.

== Alphabetically by last name ==
=== A ===
- Jason Anick (born 1985)
- Svend Asmussen (1916–2017)

=== B ===
- Elek Bacsik (1926–1993)
- Adam Bałdych (born 1986)
- Billy Bang (1947–2011)
- John Blake Jr. (1947–2014)
- Polly Bradfield (born 1970)
- Zach Brock (born 1974)
- Benedikt Brydern (born 1966)
- Charles Burnham (born 1950)

=== C ===
- Yilian Cañizares
- Regina Carter (born 1966)
- Sara Caswell (born 1978)
- Graham Clark (born 1959)
- Vassar Clements (1928–2005)
- Blanche Coleman (1910–2008)
- Ornette Coleman (1930–2015)
- Billy Contreras (born 1984)
- Ian Cooper (born 1970)
- David Cross (born 1949)

=== D ===
- Jerald Daemyon
- Diane Delin
- Eddie Drennon (born 1940)

=== E ===
- Babe Egan (1897–1966)

=== F ===
- David Favis-Mortlock (born 1953)
- Mark Feldman (born 1955)
- Johnny Frigo (1916–2007)

=== G ===
- Daniel Garlitsky (born 1982)
- Jerry Goodman (born 1949)
- Stéphane Grappelli (1908–1997)
- Valentin Gregor (born 1963)
- Henry Grimes (1935–2020)

=== H ===
- Tuva Halse (born 1999)
- Edward W. Hardy (born 1992)
- Alex Hargreaves (born 1992)
- Don "Sugarcane" Harris (1938–1999)
- Christian Howes (born 1972)
- Jason Kao Hwang (born 1957)

=== J ===
- Leroy Jenkins (1932–2007)

=== K ===
- Carla Kihlstedt (born 1971)
- Tim Kliphuis (born 1974)
- Ola Kvernberg (born 1981)

=== L ===
- Didier Lockwood (1956–2018)

=== M ===
- Yehudi Menuhin (1916–1999)
- Manoj George (born 1971)
- Mat Maneri (born 1969)

=== N ===
- Stephen Nachmanovitch (born 1950)
- Sana Nagano
- Reiko Nakano (born 1983)
- Ray Nance (1913–1976)
- Florin Niculescu (born 1967)

=== O ===
- Mic Oechsner (born 1956)

=== P ===
- Jimmy Palao (1879–1925)
- Dominique Pifarély (born 1957)
- Noel Pointer (1954–1994)
- Jean-Luc Ponty (born 1942)
- Ari Poutiainen (born 1972)
- Tobias Preisig (born 1981)
- Omar Puente (born 1961)

=== R ===
- Sonya Robinson (born 1959)
- David Ragsdale (born 1958)

=== S ===
- Randy Sabien (born 1956)
- Jenny Scheinman (born 1973)
- Zbigniew Seifert (1946–1979)
- Stuff Smith (1909–1967)
- Ginger Smock (1920–1995)
- Dave Soldier (born 1956)
- Eddie South (1904–1962)

=== T ===
- Adam Taubitz (born 1967)
- Scott Tixier (born 1986)
- Mads Tolling (born 1980)

=== U ===
- Michał Urbaniak (born 1943)

=== V ===
- Joe Venuti (1903–1978)

=== W ===
- Michel Warlop (1911–1947)
- Noel Webb (born 1958)
- Michael White (1930–2016)
- Claude Williams (1908–2004)
- Samuel "Savoirfaire" Williams (from Chicago)
- Bob Wills (1905–1975)

=== Z ===
- Helmut Zacharius (1920–2002)
