= Jazz violin =

Musical style

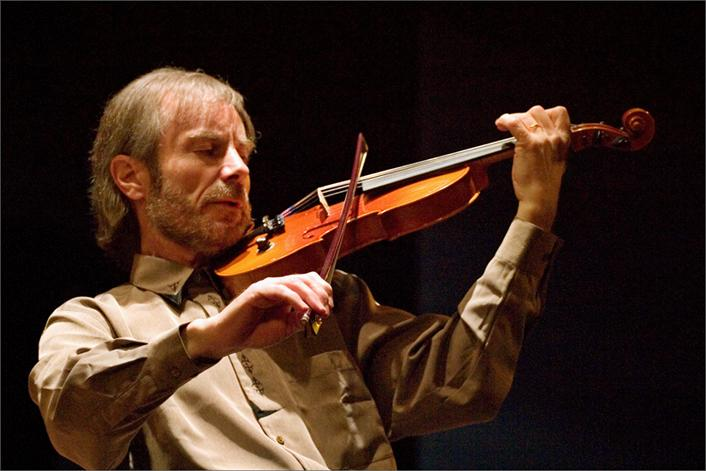
French jazz violinist Jean-Luc Ponty is a jazz-rock fusion performer

Jazz violin is the use of the violin or electric violin to improvise solo lines. Early jazz violinists included: Eddie South, who played violin with Jimmy Wade's Dixielanders in Chicago; Stuff Smith; and Claude "Fiddler" Williams. Joe Venuti was popular for his work with guitarist Eddie Lang during the 1920s. Improvising violinists include Stéphane Grappelli and Jean-Luc Ponty. In jazz fusion, violinists may use an electric violin plugged into an instrument amplifier with electronic effects.

== Swing to bebop ==
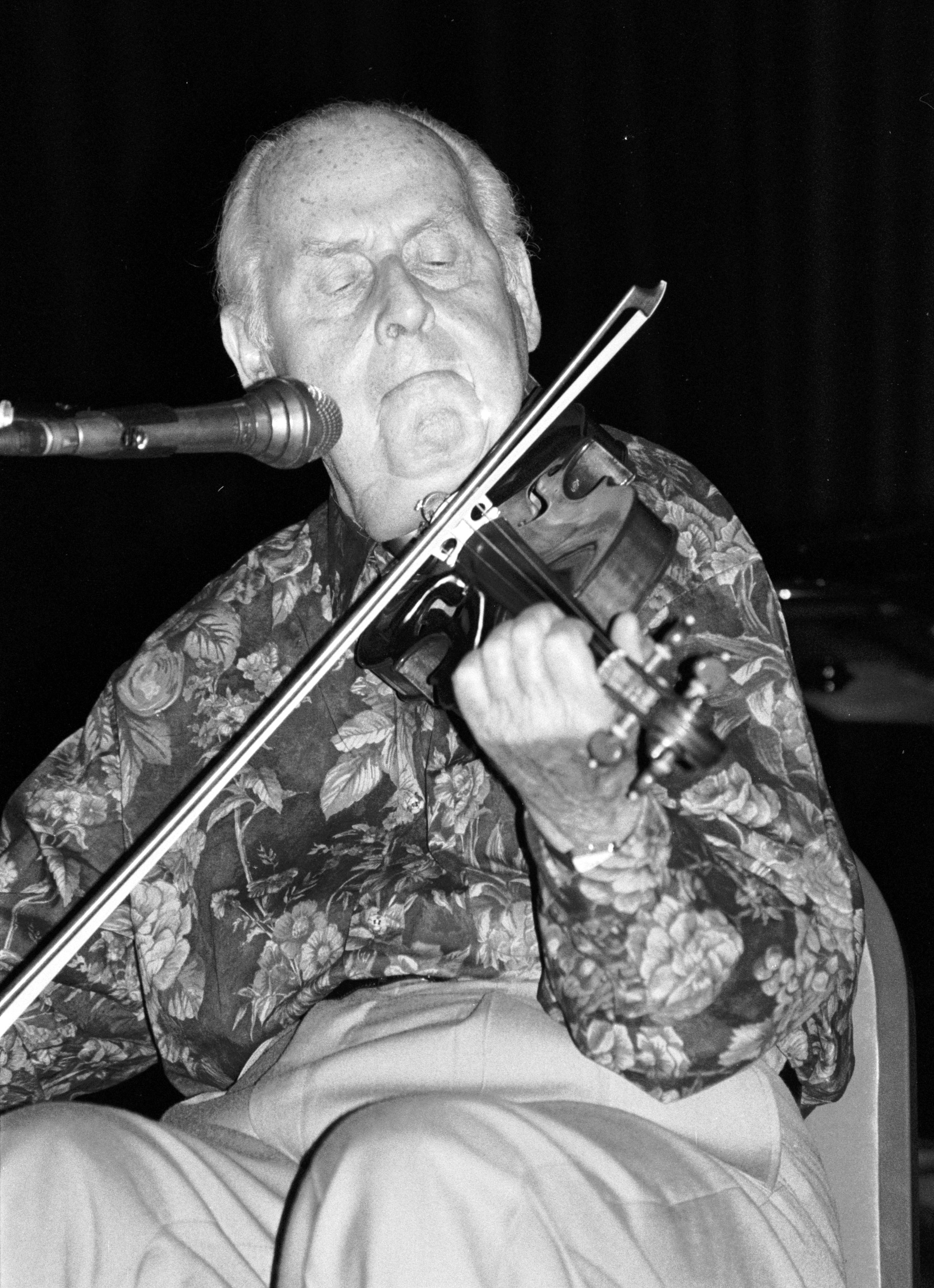
Stéphane Grappelli founded the gypsy jazz Quintette du Hot Club de France with guitarist Django Reinhardt before World War II.

Jazz violin began in New Orleans in the early 1900s. Arrangements for ragtime orchestras had parts for violins in which they were as important as the other instruments. The violin was a lead instrument in the recordings of A. J. Piron, whose trumpeter Peter Bocage also played violin. Alphonso Trent and Andy Kirk employed violinists in their territory bands. Stuff Smith played violin as a member of Trent's band in the 1920s and tinkered with acoustic and electric means of increasing the volume of the instrument. Claude Williams alternated between guitar and violin when as a member of the Count Basie orchestra. In Chicago, Eddie South was violinist and music director for Jimmy Wade. South was accompanied by Juice Wilson when both were members of the Freddie Keppard band. Violin is one instrument Edgar Sampson performed on as a member of the Fletcher Henderson band in the 1930s. Angelina Rivera was a classically trained violinist who worked with Josephine Baker and Spencer Williams. W. C. Handy conducted an orchestra with a three-violin section that included Darnell Howard. Paul Whiteman's jazz orchestra had a string section that was led by Matty Malneck. The bands of Artie Shaw, Tommy Dorsey, and Earl Hines had string sections, though they didn't improvise. Bandleaders who were also violinists included Leon Abbey, Clarence Black, Carroll Dickerson, and Erskine Tate.

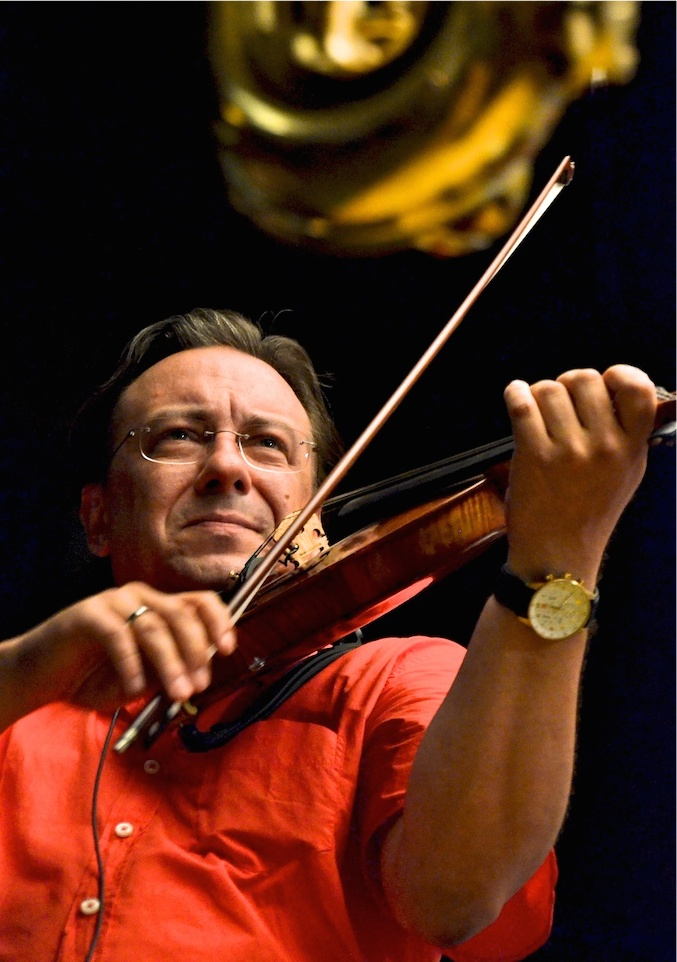
Adam Taubitz founded The Berlin Philharmonic Jazz Group.

Violin became a solo instrument in jazz largely through the efforts of Stuff Smith, Eddie South, Stephane Grappelli, and Joe Venuti. Venuti was in a popular duo with guitarist Eddie Lang beginning in the 1920s. Grappelli was a member of the gypsy jazz group Quintette du Hot Club de France with guitarist Django Reinhardt. In the 1930s when swing was dominant, other violinists included Darnell Howard, Ray Nance, Ray Perry, Svend Asmussen, and Michel Warlop. Perry and Ginger Smock provided a link from swing violin to bebop. Examples of bop violin in the 1950s include Dick Wetmore and Harry Lookofsky, who was in the NBC Orchestra led by Arturo Toscanini. Jean-Luc Ponty played bop violin in the 1960s as did Elek Bacsik in the 1970s.

The violin is well-represented in modern jazz and improvisational music. Mark Feldman is one of the leading performers in modern and contemporary jazz violin, along with Scott Tixier, Mat Maneri, Billy Bang and Jean-Luc Ponty. Adam Taubitz founded The Berlin Philharmonic Jazz Group. With this group he played -and still does- as a soloist on the trumpet and the violin in Europe and the Far East. Regina Carter regularly appears in readers' and critic's polls at Downbeat magazine while playing in an earthy, R&B-influenced style. In gypsy jazz, contemporary violin players include Romanian born Florin Niculescu, Belgian Tcha Limberger, and French violinist and guitarist Dorado Schmitt.

== Amplification ==
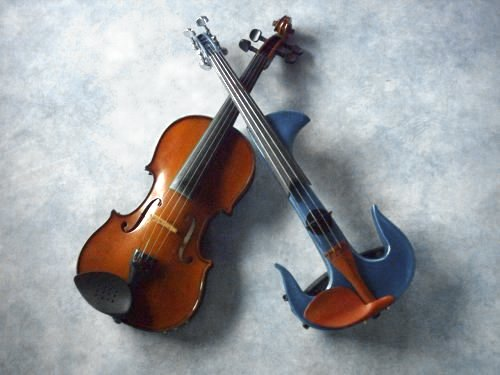
A standard violin and an electric violin with a cut-away body

Big bands are loud, but the violin is quiet. One person to address the problem was Augustus Stroh, who invented the Stroh violin in the 1890s that was inspired by the gramophone, with a horn connected to project the sound. In the 1930s, Stuff Smith experimented with electric amplification. Since the 1980s an electric violin has been used in which a transducer is built into the instrument.

Jean-Luc Ponty's attraction to jazz was influenced by Miles Davis and John Coltrane, which led him to the electric violin. Critic Joachim Berendt wrote, "Since Ponty, the jazz violin has been a different instrument" and compared his phrasing to Coltrane's.

== See also ==
- Swing (jazz performance style)
- List of jazz violinists
- Joe Venuti Discography
