= Joe Venuti discography =

Joe Venuti, also known as the Father of Jazz Violin, recorded under his own billing from 1926 to 1978. Venuti had a momentary lapse in his career from 1961-1967 and was most prolific in the last decade of his career.

This discography organizes original discs/LPs/CDs in issue order with an emphasis on reflecting the recordings as they might be found in the field. Secondary, non-commercial issues and unissued items are not included, except in cases where a secondary issue contains a different coupling, or when no issue can be considered "primary," as in the case of dime-store labels. Matrix numbers are not included, but this information is provided when multiple takes of a title are available. Corrections are welcome, especially when it comes to specific billing on a label or the verbatim appearance of titles. However, any rearrangement into strict chronological order in a track-based economy or by session—such as is common in traditional discography—is discouraged, as it would defeat the purpose of this listing and tend to duplicate work found elsewhere. The issue order does not automatically reflect strict chronological order of recording.

This discography does not include 78-era guest appearances by Venuti on records billed to other artists. For these, please visit the listings in Mosaic Records' The Classic Columbia and OKeh Joe Venuti and Eddie Lang Sessions Discography and in the entry for Venuti in Tom Lord's The Jazz Discography. Those principally interested in the career of Venuti's longtime collaborator Eddie Lang may wish to consult the excellent discography at Eddie Lang Sessions. In the case of mixed issues where a Venuti side is coupled with another artist, the other artist's name is included, but not the title of the piece performed.

== 78 rpm issues (1926–1950) ==
Disc	Artist Credit	Coupling	Recording Date	Notes
Columbia 914-D	Joe Venuti & Eddie Lang	Stringin' the Blues (takes 8 & 11)/Black and Blue Bottom	11-8-1926/9-26-1926	
Okeh 40762	Joe Venuti & Eddie Lang	Sunshine/Wild Cat	1-24-1927	
Okeh 40825	Joe Venuti & Eddie Lang	Doin' Things/Goin' Places	5-4-1927	
Okeh 40853	Joe Venuti's Blue Four	Kickin' the Cat/Beatin' the Dog	6-28-1927	
Okeh 40897	Joe Venuti's Blue Four	Cheese and Crackers/A Mug of Ale	9-13-1927	
Okeh 40947	Joe Venuti's Blue Four	Four String Joe/Penn Beach Blues	11-15-1927	
Okeh 41025	Joe Venuti's Blue Four	Dinah/The Wild Dog	3-28-1928	
Okeh 41051	Joe Venuti & his New Yorkers with Ed Lang	I Must Be Dreaming/'Tain't So Honey, 'Tain't So	5-25-1928	
Okeh 41056	Joe Venuti & his New Yorkers with Ed Lang	Because My Baby Don't Mean "Maybe" Now/Just Like a Melody Out of the Sky	6-6-1928	
Okeh 41076	Joe Venuti's Blue Four	Pretty Trix/The Man From the South	6-14-1928	
Victor 21561	Joe Venuti & Eddie Lang	Doin' Things (take 3)/Wild Cat (take 3)	6-21-1928	
Bluebird 10280	Joe Venuti & Eddie Lang	Doin' Things (take 2)/Wild Cat (take 1)	6-21-1928	
Okeh 41087	Joe Venuti & his New Yorkers	Pickin' Cotton/I'm on the Crest of a Wave	7-24-1928	
Okeh 41133	Joe Venuti & his New Yorkers	Doin' Things/I Must Have That Man!	10-4-1928	
Okeh 41144	Joe Venuti's Blue Four	The Blue Room/Sensation	9-27-1928	
Okeh 41192	Joe Venuti & his New Yorkers	That's the Good Old Sunny South/Weary River	2-2-1929	
Okeh 41251	Joe Venuti's Blue Four	My Honey's Lovin' Arms/Goin' Home	12-12-1928	
Okeh 41263	Joe Venuti & his New Yorkers	I'm in Seventh Heaven/Little Pal	5-1-1929	
Okeh 41320	Joe Venuti & his New Yorkers	The Chant of the Jungle/That Wonderful Something	10-16-1929	
Okeh 41361	Joe Venuti's Blue Four	Running Ragged/Apple Blossoms	10-28-1929	
Okeh 41427	Joe Venuti & his New Yorkers	Promises (takes B & C)/Dancing With Tears in My Eyes (takes A & C)	5-22-1930	
Okeh 41432	Joe Venuti's Blue Four	Raggin' the Scale/Put and Take (takes A & C)	5-7-1930	
Clarion 5474-C, Harmony1427-H, Velvet Tone 2534-V	Tennessee Music Men	Raggin' the Scale/Miff Mole	5-7-1930	
Okeh 41451	Joe Venuti & his New Yorkers	I'm Only Human After All/Out of Breath	9-6-1930	
Victor 23015	Joe Venuti & his Orchestra	My Man From Caroline/I Like a Little Girl Like That	9-30-1930	
Victor 23018	Joe Venuti & his Orchestra	Wasting My Love On You/Bix Beiderbecke	9-30-1930	
Victor 23021	Joe Venuti's Blue Four	The Wild Dog/Really Blue	10-7-1930	
Okeh 41469	Joe Venuti's Blue Four	I've Found a New Baby/Sweet Sue, Just You	11-12-1930	
Okeh 41506	Joe Venuti's Blue Four	Pardon Me Pretty Baby/Little Buttercup	6-10-1931	
Columbia 2488-D	Joe Venuti's Rhythm Boys	Little Girl/Tempo di Modernage	6-10-1931	
Parlophone (UK) R 1063	Joe Venuti's Blue Four	Little Girl/Tempo di Barrel	6-10-1931	(same recording as above)
Columbia 2535-D	Joe Venuti's Rhythm Boys	There's No Other Girl/Now That I Need You, You're Gone	9-10-1931	
Columbia 2589-D	Joe Venuti's Rhythm Boys	The Wolf Wobble/Dorsey Brothers Orchestra	9-10-1931	
Parlophone (UK) R-1115	Joe Venuti's Rhythm Boys	To To Blues/Emmett Miller	9-10-1931	
Vocalion 15858, Melotone M-12277, UCHA 105/106	Eddie Lang & Joe Venuti's All-Star Orchestra	Farewell Blues/Someday Sweetheart	10-22-1931	
Vocalion 15864, Melotone M-12294, Polk P-9095, UCHA 107/108	Eddie Lang & Joe Venuti's All-Star Orchestra	After You've Gone/Beale Street Blues	10-22-1931	
Lucky 7000	Joe Venuti & Friends	Onyx Club Revue/Non Skid Manure	1-24-1933/4-8-1933	
Columbia 2765-D	Joe Venuti & Eddie Lang's Blue Five	Raggin' the Scale/Art Kassel	1-28-1933	
Columbia (UK) CB 601	Joe Venuti & Eddie Lang's Blue Five	Hey! Young Fella/Pink Elephants	2-28-1933	
Columbia 2782-D	Joe Venuti's Blue Five	Jig Saw Puzzle Blues/Vibraphonia	2-28-1933/5-8-1933	

Eddie Lang dies March 26, 1933

Disc	Artist Credit	Coupling	Date	Notes
Columbia 2783-D	Joe Venuti's Blue Five	Isn't It Heavenly?/Billy Cotton	5-8-1933	
Columbia (UK) CB 637	Joe Venuti & his Orchestra	Hiawatha's Lullaby/My Gypsy Rhapsody	5-8-1933	
Ногинский Завод (Noginskiy Factory) (USSR) Г 8746 ГРК 2218	Орк. под управлением Ч. Венутти	ИНДЕЙСКАЯ КОЛЫБЕЛЬНАЯ (Hiawatha's Lullaby)	5-8-1933	
Melotone M-12807, Banner 32872, Perfect 15830	Joe Venuti & His New Yorkers or Joe Venuti and his Orchestra	I Want to Ring Bells/Gather Lip Rouge While Ye May	9-25-1933	
Oriole 2771, Romeo 2144, Domino 152	Joe Venuti & His New Yorkers or Joe Venuti and his Orchestra	I Want to Ring Bells/Gather Lip Rouge While Ye May	9-25-1933	
Melotone M-12816, Banner 32874, Perfect 15832	Joe Venuti & his Orchestra	You're My Past, Present, and Future/Doin' the Uptown Lowdown	9-25-1933	
Conqueror 8250, Oriole 2776, Romeo 2149, Domino 154	Joe Venuti & his Orchestra	You're My Past, Present, and Future/Doin' the Uptown Lowdown	9-25-1933	
Melotone M-12831, Banner 32883, Perfect 15482, Oriole 2787, Romeo 2160	Joe Venuti & his Orchestra	Moonglow/Cheese and Crackers	9-25-1933	
Columbia 2834-D	Joe Venuti & his Orchestra	Doin' the Uptown Lowdown/Emil Coleman	10-2-1933	
Columbia (UK) CB 708	Joe Venuti & his Blue Six	Sweet Lorraine/Doin' the Uptown Lowdown	10-2-1933	
Decca 18167	Joe Venuti & his Blue Six	Sweet Lorriane/Doin' the Uptown Lowdown	10-2-1933	
Bluebird B-5293	Joe Venuti & his Orchestra	Fiddlesticks (take 1)/Phantom Rhapsody	10-13-1933	
Victor 24946 (Argentina)	Joe Venuti & his Orchestra	Fiddlesticks (take 2)/Phantom Rhapsody	10-13-1933	
Bluebird B-5520	Joe Venuti & his Orchestra	Moonglow/Everybody Shuffle	10-13-1933	
Montgomery Ward 4504	Joe Venuti & his Orchestra	Moonglow/Totem Lodge Orchestra	10-13-1933	
Columbia (UK) CB 686	Joe Venuti & his Blue Six	The Jazz Me Blues/In De Ruff (take 2)	11-3-1933	
Decca 18168	Joe Venuti & his Blue Six	The Jazz Me Blues/In De Ruff (take 2)	11-3-1933	
Melotone M-12838, Banner 32895, Perfect 15845	Joe Venuti & his Orchestra	Everything I Have is Yours/My Dancing Lady	11-3-1933	
Conqueror 14256, Oriole 2791, Romeo 2164	Joe Venuti & his Orchestra	Everything I Have is Yours/My Dancing Lady	11-3-1933	
Lucky 7001	Joe Venuti & Friends	Venuti's Pagliacci No. 1/Onyx Club Revue No. 2	12-12-1933	
Okeh 41586	Joe Venuti and his Orchestra [Venuti fronting Joe Haymes' Orchestra]	Fiddlesticks/Goblin Market	8-17-1934	
Regal-Zonophone (UK) MR 1452	Joe Venuti's Blue Four	Satan's Holiday/Hell's Bells And Hallelujah	9-20-1934	
Regal-Zonophone (UK) MR 1508	Joe Venuti's Blue Four	Tea Time/Romantic Joe	9-20-1934	
Decca 624	Joe Venuti's Blue Four	Mello as a Cello/Nothing But Notes	3-20-1935	
Decca 625	Joe Venuti's Blue Four	Mystery/Tap Room Blues	3-20-1935	
Columbia 3103-D	Joe Venuti & his Orchestra	Eeney Meeny Miney Mo/Twenty Four Hours a Day	10-28-1935	
Columbia 3104-D	Joe Venuti & his Orchestra	Stop Look and Listen/Yankee Doodle Never Went to Town	10-28-1935	
Columbia 3105-D	Joe Venuti & Russ Morgan	Red Velvet/Black Satin	10-28-1935	
Decca 2312	Joe Venuti & his Orchestra	Something/Nothing	1-25-1939	
Decca 2313	Joe Venuti & his Orchestra	Flop/Flip	1-25-1939	
Tempo 516/518/520	Pietro Gentile with Joe Venuti & strings	Musical Milestones of the Jewish People	1946	
Tempo 516	Joe Venuti & Pietro Gentile	Eli Eli/Rachem	1946	
Tempo 518	Joe Venuti & Pietro Gentile	A Yiddishe Momme/Oy der rebbenu	1946	
Tempo 520	Joe Venuti & Pietro Gentile	Meirke mein sumn/A dudele	1946	
Tempo 528	Joe Venuti, Herb Kern, Lloyd Sloop, Lou Singer	Summertime part 1/Summertime part 2	10-1946	
Tempo 530	Joe Venuti & Dr. Kolline/Joe Venuti, Herb Kern, Charlotte Tinsley, Vincent Terri, Larry Breen	Kreutzer No. 27/Loose Bow Boogie	10-1946	
Tempo 532	Joe Venuti & his Orchestra/Joe Venuti, Herb Kern, Charlotte Tinsley, Vincent Terri	Filigree/Star Dust	10-1946	
Tempo 534	Joe Venuti, Herb Kern, Charlotte Tinsley, Vincent Terri, Larry Breen	Body and Soul/Santa Lucia	10-1946	
Tempo 536	Joe Venuti, Herb Kern, Charlotte Tinsley, Vincent Terri, Larry Breen, Lou Singer	Tea for Two/Estrellita	10-1946	
Tempo 538	Joe Venuti, Herb Kern, Charlotte Tinsley, Vincent Terri, Larry Breen	Danny Boy/When Irish Eyes Are Smiling	10-1946	
Tempo 540	Joe Venuti, Herb Kern, Charlotte Tinsley, Vincent Terri, Larry Breen	Rose of Tralee/Cruiskeen Lawn	10-1946	
Tempo 542	Joe Venuti, Herb Kern, Charlotte Tinsley, Vincent Terri, Larry Breen	The Kerry Dance/Garden Where the Pratees Grow	10-1946	
Tempo 580	Joe Venuti, Herb Kern, Charlotte Tinsley, Vincent Terri, Larry Breen	If I Had My Way/Wishing	10-1946	
Pan-American 046	Jon Laurenz with Joe Venuti & his All Star Orchestra	Come Back to Sorrento/Toselli's Serenade	1946	
Pan-American 054	Jon Laurenz with Joe Venuti & his All Star Orchestra	Louise/Auf Wiedersehen, My Dear	1946	
Pan-American 055	Jon Laurenz with Joe Venuti & his All Star Orchestra	A Little Love, a Little Kiss/My Melancholy Baby	1946	
Pan-American 060	Jon Laurenz with Joe Venuti & his All Star Orchestra	South of the Border/My Ol' Ten Gallon Hat	1946	
Pan-American 063	Jon Laurenz with Joe Venuti & his All Star Orchestra	Passe/Lovely Fantasy	1946	
Pan-American 064	Jon Laurenz with Joe Venuti & his All Star Orchestra	You Call It Madness/I Surrender Dear	1946	
Tops 1007	Jon Laurenz with Joe Venuti & his All Star Orchestra	Auf Wiedersehen, My Dear/I Surrender Dear	1946	
Parlophone R-3043	Joe Venuti, Charlotte Tinsley, Vincent Terri, Larry Breen	Body and Soul/Tea for Two	1-1947	
Tempo 580/582/584	Donald Novis, with Orchestra under the direction of Joe Venuti (and others)	Queen for a Day	11-1947	
Tempo 408, 4524 (45 rpm)	Joe Venuti, Bobby Maxwell, Jimmy Briggs & the Joe Venuti Rhythmists	Melancholy Baby/Karavan	6-1949	
Tempo 410, 4526 (45 rpm)	Joe Venuti & his Orchestra	Alexander's Ragtime Band/Zone 28	8-1949	
Tempo 414, 4528 (45 rpm), Oriole (UK) 1069	Joe Venuti & his Orchestra	My Heart Stood Still/Schon Rosmarin	8-1949	
Tempo 416, 4530 (45 rpm)	Joe Venuti & Bobby Maxwell	Skeletons at Midnight aka Danse Macabre/It Ain't Necessarily So	8-1949	
Tempo 426	Joe Venuti Trio	The Hot Canary/Flat Tortillas	9-1949	
Decca 27134	Joe Venuti & Russ Morgan	Black Satin/Red Velvet	3-9-1950	

== Mono LP and corresponding CD issues (1948–1960) ==
Disc	Album Artist and Title	Date	Notes
Tempo TT-2008	Joe Venuti and His Violin/Galla-Rini and His Accordion	1948	split LP
Tempo TT-2056	Joe Venuti and His Violin/Italy's Two Greatest Accordionists: Wolmer Beltrami and Francesco Ferrari	1948	split LP
Tempo TT-2064	Joe Venuti and His Violin/Bobby Maxwell and His Swing Harp	1950	split LP
Tempo TT-2220	Don Blanding: Twelve Great Poems from "Vagabond's House"	1950	Venuti as musical director; recorded late November 1949. Also issued as 78 rpm album set; CD re-release in 2013, but no details.
Tempo TT-2230	Joe Venuti: Vignettes by Venuti	1949	10-inch LP
Tempo TT-2236	Joe Venuti and Bobby Maxwell	1949	10-inch LP
Decca DL-5273	Joe Venuti and Russ Morgan: World's Greatest Jazz Violinist	3-9-1950	10-inch LP
Tops L 101	John Laurenz with Joe Venuti and His Orchestra: Six All-Time Hits	recorded 1946, issued c. 1952	10-inch LP
Tops L 923	John Laurenz with Joe Venuti and His Orchestra: Twilight On the Trail	recorded 1946, issued c. 1952	10-inch LP
Shoestring 111	Joe Venuti: The Mad Fiddler from Philly	1952–1953	from radio airchecks; issued 1970s
Sandy Hook 2047	Joe Venuti: Hot Swing Fiddle Classics	1952–1953	probably identical to Shoestring 111, issued 1981
Jazz Man LJ-336	Joe Venuti, violin with Tony Romano playing Eddie Lang's Guitar	10-1954	
Just a Memory JAM-9127-2	Joe Venuti with Tony Romano: Never Before, and Never Again	1953–1954	CD, issued 2000
Grand Award G.A. 33-351	Joe Venuti with Paul Whiteman and his Orchestra: Fiddle On Fire	1957	
Grand Award EP-2020	Joe Venuti with Paul Whiteman and his Orchestra: Fine and Dandy/Midnight in Monte Carlo/Hindustan/Body and Soul	1957	45 rpm 7"
Golden Crest CR-3100	Joe Venuti plays Gershwin	1960	
Golden Crest CR-3101	Joe Venuti plays Jerome Kern	1960	

== Stereo LP and corresponding CD issues (1968–1998) ==
Disc	Album Artist and Title	Date	Notes
Ovation OV/14-04	Joe Venuti: Once More with Feeling	1968	
Affinity AFF 29	Stephane Grappelli & Joe Venuti: Venupelli Blues	1980	recorded 10–22–1969 in Paris
Audiophile AP 118	Joe Venuti with the Gil Cuppini Orchestra: The Incredible Joe Venuti	1971	
RCA/Black & White (France) 7149	Joe Venuti: Violinology	1971	
Durium ms A 77277	Joe Venuti in Milan with Lino Patruno & His Friends	1971	
VanguardVSD-79396	Joe Venuti in Milan	1971	
Everest FS-349	Joe Venuti with the Dutch Swing College Band	1971	
Halcyon HAL 112	Marian McPartland and Joe Venuti: The Maestro and Friend	1973	
MPS 21 20885-0p	Joe Venuti:...the Daddy of the Violin	1973	
Pausa PR 7034	Joe Venuti: Doin' Things	1973	
Chiaroscuro CR 128	Joe Venuti and Zoot Sims: Joe and Zoot	1974	
Chiaroscuro CR(D) 128	Joe Venuti and Zoot Sims: Joe and Zoot and more	1998	recorded 1973–1974; re-issued with 5 extra tracks
Chiaroscuro CR134	The Joe Venuti Blue Four	1974	
Durium ms A 77356	Joe Venuti with Lino Patruno & his Friends: Welcome Joe!	1974	recorded in Milan 9–13 and 9–14, 1974; re-issued in 1981 as Durium Start LP.S 40.133
Vanguard VSD-79405	Joe Venuti: Jazz Violin	1974	Identical to Welcome Joe!
Concord Jazz CJ-14	Joe Venuti and George Barnes: Gems	1975	
Chiaroscuro CR 145	Joe Venuti and Earl Hines: Hot Sonatas	1975	
Chiaroscuro CR(D) 145	Joe Venuti and Earl Hines: Hot Sonatas	1998	recorded 1975, re-issued with 5 extra tracks
Orly SBV 336 (France)	Joe Venuti and the Holiday Mood Orchestra: Venutiana (aka New Times Vol. 11)	1976	
Jump ??? (Italy)	Joe Venuti and the Holiday Mood Orchestra: Venutiana, concerto for violin & orchestra	1977	Contains different filler material from the Orly release
Chiaroscuro CR-153	Joe Venuti: Hooray for Joe!	1977	
Sonet SNTF-734	Joe Venuti: Sliding By	1977	recorded 4–15–1977
Chiaroscuro CR 160	Joe Venuti and Dave McKenna: Alone at the Palace	1977	recorded Palace Theater, Albany NY 4–27 and 4–28–1977
Chiaroscuro CR(D) 160	Joe Venuti and Dave McKenna: Alone at the Palace	1991	recorded Palace Theater, Albany NY in 1977, re-issued with 7 extra tracks and some alternates
Flying Fish 035	Joe Venuti, Eldon Shamblin, Curly Chalker, Jethro Burns: 4 Giants of Swing	1977	
Concord Jazz CJ-30	Joe Venuti and George Barnes: Live at the Concord Summer Festival	1978	
Concord Jazz CJ-51	Ross Tompkins and Joe Venuti: Live at Concord '77	1978	recorded 8–5–1977
Dobre Records DR-1066	Joe Ventui and Tony Romano: Never Before...Never Again	1979	
Flying Fish 077	Joe in Chicago, 1978	1979	Venuti's last recording
Chiaroscuro CR-203	The Best of Joe Venuti	1979	
Vanguard/Omega 3019 (CD)	The Fabulous Joe Venuti	1995	combines Vanguard VSD-79396 and VSD-79405
Laserlight 17183	The Best of Jazz Violin	1998	contains five Venuti tracks from 1971
Hoban Music	Joe's Last Ride	2013	Venuti's final sessions. Recorded in Chicago at Curtom Studios in 1977, sold privately on CDR by producer Bob Hogan.

== Guest appearances on LP and CD (1948–2005) ==
Disc	Album Artist and Title	Date	Notes
Tempo TT 2086	Bobby Maxwell and His Swing Harp/Mel Henke and His Ultra-Modern Piano	1948	Venuti, uncredited, on two tracks on the Bobby Maxwell side
Joyce 1128	One Night Stand with Bing Crosby's 20th Anniversary in Show Business	1970s	with Venuti as guest on Bing's Chesterfield radio program, 1951
Sunbeam HB-309	The Dinah Shore–Bing Crosby Shows	1975	with Venuti as guest on Bing's Chesterfield radio program, recorded 11–13–1952
Grand Award G. A. 33-901	Paul Whiteman 50th Anniversary	1959	Venuti featured on 2 tracks
Columbia M 32587	Dick Hyman: Ferdinand "Jelly Roll" Morton Transcriptions for Orchestra - Some Rags, Some Stomps and a Little Blues	1974	
Flying Fish M1366	Bucky Pizzarelli: Nightwings	1975	
Warner Bros. BS-2888	Leon Redbone: On the Track	1975	
Golden Crest CRSQ31043	The New England Conservatory Jazz Repertory Orchestra, Gunther Schuller, conductor, Joe Venuti, special guest artist: Happy Feet, a Tribute to Paul Whiteman	1976	
DSC Productions PA 2020, Everest FS-341	The Dutch College Swing Band with Famous American Guests	1977	recorded 1972–76
Hindsight HSR-229	Kay Starr: The Uncollected Kay Starr 1949 Vol. 2	1979	
Varèse Sarabande 066672-2 (CD)	Les Paul and his Trio: Crazy Rhythm	2005	Includes Venuti with Kay Starr on 3 tracks, 1944–45

== Reissues on LP and CD from 78rpm era material (1953–present) ==
Disc	Album Artist and Title	Date	Notes
X LVA-3036 (10-inch LP)	Joe Venuti and Eddie Lang with Tommy Dorsey, Jimmy Dorsey and Phil Napoleon	1955	Issued 8-10-1955: includes first releases of two 78-era alternates
Design DLP 54	Joe Venuti and Louis Prima: Hi-Fi Lootin'	1957	Sourced from 1934 to 1935 transcriptions
Columbia C2L-24 (2-LP set)	Eddie Lang & Joe Venuti: Stringing the Blues	1962	Curated by Frank Driggs
Regal REG.1076	Joe Venuti & Eddie Lang: Hell's Bells and Hallelujah	1960s	
Big Band Archives LP-1215	Joe Venuti & His Big Band	c. 1970	Broadcast and transcription material from Venuti's big band featuring Kay Starr, c. 1945
RCA Black & White Vol. 118 FPMI 7016 (LP and CD)	Joe Venuti & Eddie Lang: Hot Strings	c. 1974	
Sunbeam MFC-16	Time Out for Listening: Theatre Intermission Music 1932–34	1976	Sourced from transcription material and including Venuti with other artists
TOM 7 (LP and CD)	Venuti-Lang Vol. 1 1927–1928	1970s; CD issued 2000	
TOM 8 (LP and CD)	Venuti-Lang Vol. 2 1928–1930	1970s; CD issued 2000	
Swaggie Records (Australia) 817	Joe Venuti and Eddie Lang 1926–1930	1984	
Swaggie (Australia) 819	Joe Venuti and Eddie Lang 1930–1933	1984	
Conifer 172/DRG 200 (CD; though Conifer was also an LP)	Joe Venuti: Fiddlesticks (Conifer)/Joe Venuti - Eddie Lang: Great Original Performances 1926–1933 (DRG)	1987/1992	Identical releases, in digitally simulated stereo
Yazoo 1062 (LP and CD)	Joe Venuti: Violin Jazz	1989	Some material identified as alternate, or unissued, within the notes is apparently not so.
IAJRC CD1003 (CD)	Joe Venuti: Pretty Trix	1993	Sourced from 1934 to 1935 transcriptions
Pearl Topaz 1015	Joe Venuti: Stringin' the Blues	1995	Direct lift from Columbia C2L-24
EPM Musique 160132 (CD)	Joe Venuti: Four String Joe	2001	Compilation, includes one track from 1946
ASV AJA 5386 (UK CD)	Joe Venuti and Eddie Lang: Wild Cats	2001	
Jazz Forever 67043 (CD)	Stringing the Blues: The Best of Joe Venuti and Eddie Lang	2001	
JSP 3402 (2-CD set)	Eddie Lang & Joe Venuti: The 20s and 30s Sides	2001	
Mosaic MD8-213 (4-CD box)	The Classic Columbia and OKeh Joe Venuti and Eddie Lang Sessions	2002	Collection of nearly everything recorded by Lang-Venuti 1926–1933. Out of print.
Chronological Classics 1211 (CD)	Joe Venuti 1926–1928	2002	
Chronological Classics 1246 (CD)	Joe Venuti 1928–1930	2002	
Chronological Classics 1276 (CD)	Joe Venuti 1930–1931	2002	
Naxos Jazz Legends 8.120614 (Germany CD)	Joe Venuti: The Wild Cat	2003	Not available in the U.S.
JSP JSP916 (4-CD set)	Eddie Lang & Joe Venuti: The New York Sessions 1926–1935 Remastered	2003	Mastered by John R. T. Davies
Chronological Classics 1348 (CD)	Joe Venuti 1933	2004	
Chestnut 1005 (CD)	The Best of Joe Venuti & Eddie Lang	2005	
Fuel 839 (CD)	Joe Venuti: Performance	2010	Sourced from 1934 to 1935 transcriptions.

== See also ==
- Jazz violin
- Eddie Lang
- Adrian Rollini
- Jimmy Dorsey
- Tommy Dorsey
- Paul Whiteman
- Bing Crosby
- Phil Napoleon
- Louis Prima
- Russ Morgan
- Kay Starr
- Les Paul
- Robert Maxwell
- Tempo Records
- Tony Romano
- Dutch Swing College Band
- Marian McPartland
- Zoot Sims
- George Barnes
- Earl Hines
- Dave McKenna
- Eldon Shamblin
- Curly Chalker
- Jethro Burns
- Ross Tompkins
