= Charles Edward Kerr =

American jazz musician

Charlie Kerr (11 August 1890 Philadelphia – 7 October 1976 Coconut Grove, Miami, Florida) was an American jazz drummer who led a jazz orchestra bearing his name in Philadelphia beginning in the early 1920s. In 1922, Kerr led orchestra in the first radio remote broadcast of a dance in history from the Café L'Aiglon, Philadelphia, via WIP radio. Throughout the 1930s, his orchestra continued broadcasting on stations WFI and WLIT, which merged as WFIL in 1935. During the summers of the 1930, through World War II years, his orchestra performed in Cape May City, New Jersey.

Kerr retired from music in the late 1940s and opened his own furniture store in Miami.

== Members of the Charlie Kerr Orchestra ==
- Frank Guarantee (1893–1942) – trumpet
- Cecil Way – trumpet
- Joseph DeLuca – trombone
- Tommy Dorsey (1905–1956) – trombone
- Leo McConville (1900–1968) – trumpet
- Vincenzo D'Imperio (born 1885) – saxophone
- Jerry DeMasi (born 1901) – saxophone
- Stan Keller (1907–1990) – saxophone
- William A. Bove (born 1901) – piano
- Robert McCracken – piano
- Michael O. Trafficante (born 1892) – double bass
- Albert Valante – violin
- Joe Venuti (1903 –1978) – violin
- Eddie Lang (1902–1933) – banjo, guitar

== Employers as a musician ==
- The Bellevue-Stratford Hotel, Philadelphia (c. 1918)

== Family ==
In 1918, Charlie married Edna VanDusen Kerr (née Hilt; 1894–1980). They had two children, Harry Nagle Kerr, D.O. (1912–1998) and Edward Allison Kerr (1924–2010).

Charlie’s parents, Henry Nagle Kerr (1867–1951 Miami) and Mary Emma Kerr (née Thomas; 1867–1943 Philadelphia) were married in 1889.
