= Wild Cat (song) =

Instrumental by Eddie Lang and Joe Venuti
- Recorded: New York City, January 4, 1927
- Genre: Jazz
- Label: Victor
- Composer(s): Eddie Lang and Joe Venuti

Wild Cat is an instrumental duet for violin and guitar, composed by jazz guitarist Eddie Lang and violinist Joe Venuti.

== Background ==
They first recorded it in New York, January 24, 1927. It is a showcase piece for Venuti's talent as a violinist. His performance has been held to "offer some good examples of bow rockin'." One critic described the work as follows:

"Wild Cat" illustrates the salient features of Venuti's unique violin styling. He utilized the full range of the violin, from low rich tones to the high, ethereal sounds near the bridge. [.. . ] The melody of the popular song "Wild Cat" was completely transformed through Venuti's ingenious improvisation on its underlying chord structure.

Author Katharine Rapoport included the piece as recommended listening "to really get your head (and ears) around jazz music".

Andy Stein is also noted for a virtuoso performance of the same piece. A further recording of "Wild Cat" by Stan Kurtis and Dick Hyman, which came out on the Pro Jazz label in 1987, was well received.

== CD releases ==
- Joe Venuti: Violin Jazz. Kazoo, 1990. ASIN: B000000G7Z
- Joe Venuti: Pretty Trix. Iajrc Records, 2000. ASIN: B000003KW7
- Eddie Lang & Joe Venuti: New York Sessions 1926–1935. JSP Records, 2003. ASIN: B00009XH3X
- The Best of Jazz Violins. LRC Ltd., 2009. ASIN: B000008CHD
