= Symphony No. 7 (Villa-Lobos) =

- Odisséia da paz
- by Heitor Villa-Lobos
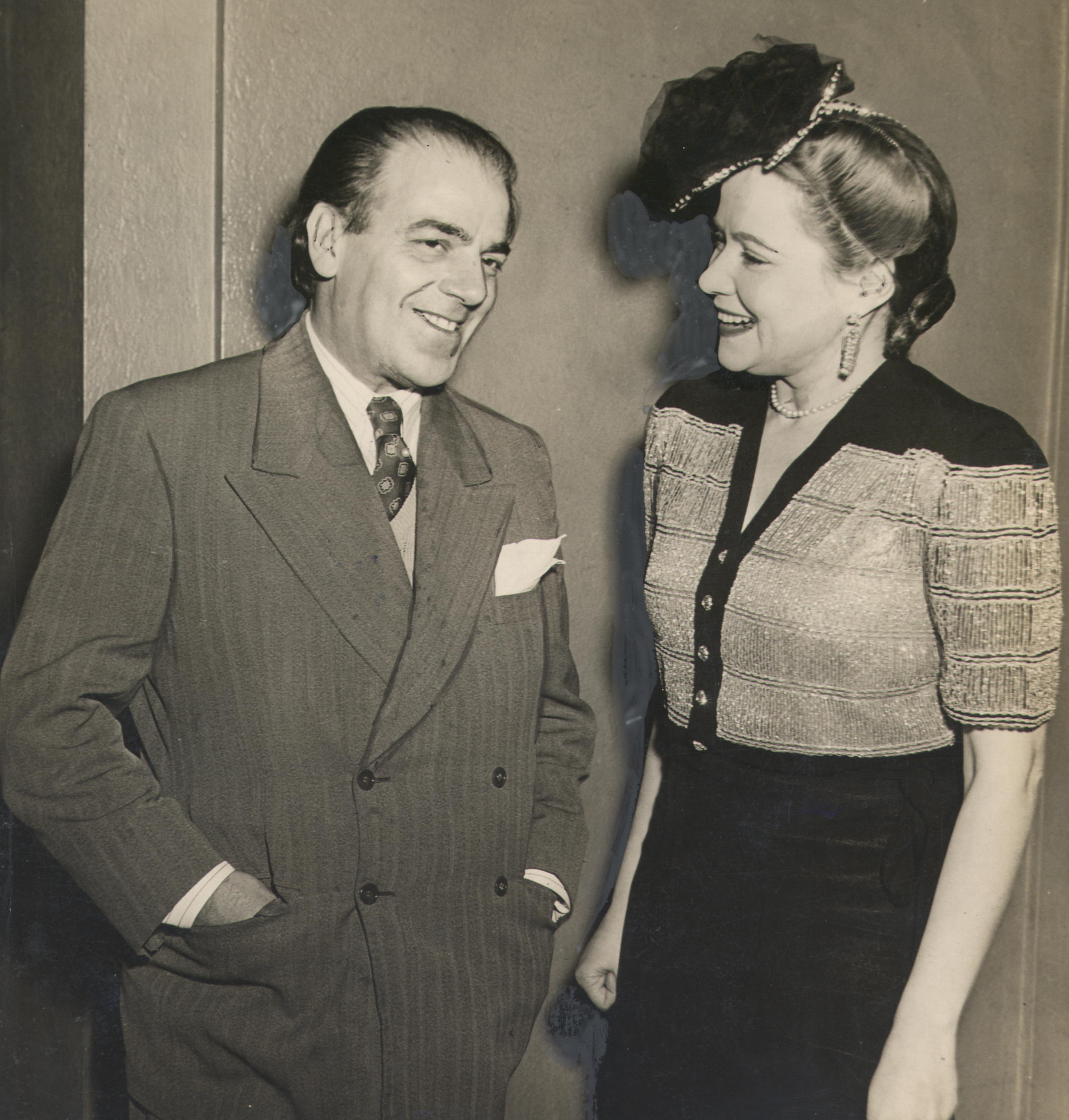
- Heitor Villa Lobos and Bidu Sayão in 1945
- English: Odyssey of the Peace
- Catalogue: W458
- Composed: 1945: Rio de Janeiro
- Published: 1978: Rio de Janeiro
- Publisher: Ricordi / Belwin Mills
- Recorded: January 1954
- Duration: 30 min
- Movements: Four

Premiere
- Date: 27 March 1949
- Location: London
- Conductor: Heitor Villa-Lobos
- Performers: London Symphony Orchestra

Symphony No. 7, subtitled Odisséia da paz (Odyssey of the Peace), is a composition by the Brazilian composer Heitor Villa-Lobos, written in 1945. A typical performance lasts about 30 minutes.

== History ==
Villa-Lobos composed his Seventh Symphony in Rio de Janeiro in 1945 for a competition in Detroit. As required by the rules of the competition, it was submitted anonymously, using the pseudonym A. Caramurú. It was not awarded a prize in the competition. It was first performed in London on 27 March 1949 by the London Symphony Orchestra, conducted by the composer.

The symphony, written shortly after the surrender of Germany on 7 May 1945, is subtitled "Odisséia da paz" (Odyssey of the Peace). The second edition of the official Villa-Lobos catalogue, however, at one place gives "Odisséia de uma raça" (the title of an unrelated symphonic poem from 1953), together with a short programmatic description:

A tidal wave splits up part of the Earth. Hills and mountains appeared, uncovering to human eyes a tortuous and irregular perspective, similar to the path of life across the centuries. As long as there are hills and mountains on earth, people will seek peace. The hills and mountains, firm and solid, planted on earth, defend mankind from whomever wishes, in vain, to destroy them and mimic them.

== Instrumentation ==
The symphony is written for an orchestra consisting of 2 piccolos, 3 flutes, 3 oboes, cor anglais, 3 clarinets, 2 bass clarinets, 3 bassoons, 2 contrabassoons, 6 horns, 4 trumpets, 4 trombones, tuba, percussion (timpani, tam-tam, cymbals, triangle, pandeira, chocalho, glockenspiel, reco reco, side drum, large snare drum, bass drum, Novachord, xylophone, and vibraphone), celesta, 2 harps, piano, and strings.

== Analysis ==
The symphony has four movements:

1. Allegro vivace
2. Lento
3. Scherzo (Allegro non troppo)
4. Allegro presiso
