= Darnell Howard =

- Born: July 25, 1895; Chicago, Illinois
- Died: September 2, 1966 (aged 71); San Francisco, California
- Instrument(s): Clarinet, violin

Darnell Howard (July 25, 1895 in Chicago – September 2, 1966 in San Francisco) was an American jazz clarinetist and violinist.

== Early life ==
Howard began playing violin at age seven, picking up clarinet and saxophone later in his youth.

== Career ==
He played professionally with John H. Wickcliffe's Ginger Orchestra from 1913 to 1916, then moved to New York City in 1917, where he played and recorded as a violinist with W. C. Handy. From there he headed to Chicago, where he led his own band, played with Charlie Elgar, and then joined James P. Johnson's Plantation Days Band, which toured London in 1923. The next year he toured Europe again as a member of the Singing Syncopators, and also played in Shanghai with this ensemble later in the decade. While in Chicago he played with Carroll Dickerson, King Oliver, and Erskine Tate. He led a quartet in 1928, and also played with Jimmy Wade's Dixielanders that year. From 1929–1930 he played with Dave Peyton, then worked briefly with Jerome Carrington before being hired by Earl Hines, with whom he played clarinet, alto sax and violin from 1931 until 1937. Howard's jazz violin is featured on the Hines band's February, 1933 recording of the Earl Hines/Jimmy Mundy swing composition "Cavernism".

In the late 1930s, Howard freelanced, then played with Fletcher Henderson and Coleman Hawkins at the beginning of the 1940s. He put together another band in Chicago from 1943 to 1945; he played with Kid Ory in California for part of 1945, then returned to Chicago and played with Doc Evans, among others. In 1948 he was once again in California with Muggsy Spanier, playing with him until 1953. Howard's only recordings as a leader were done while he worked with Bob Scobey in 1950, amounting to only four sides. He also played with Jimmy Archey early in the 1950s, then rejoined Earl Hines to play Dixieland in San Francisco from 1955 to 1962. He was with Don Ewell on his 1956–1957 albums.

After 1962, Howard suffered a prolonged illness, and after recuperating he played with Elmer Snowden, Burt Bales, and his own groups. Around 1964 or 1965, Howard could be found playing weekends at a pizza joint called LaVal's on Euclid Avenue in Berkeley. He played largely with a pick-up band of local amateur musicians (often including the San Francisco comedian Mal Sharpe on trombone). On some nights Howard was joined by Pops Foster). In 1966, Howard toured Europe as a member of the New Orleans All-Stars, then fell ill again and died later that year.
