= Charlie Elgar =

American musician (1879–1973)

- Birth name: Charles Anthony Elgar
- Born: June 13, 1879; New Orleans, Louisiana, U.S.
- Died: August, 1973 (aged 94); Chicago, Illinois, U.S.
- Genres: Jazz
- Occupations: Musician; bandleader; teacher
- Instruments: Violin; trumpet

Charles Anthony Elgar (June 13, 1879 – August 1973) was an American violinist, musician, teacher and jazz bandleader.

== Early life and education ==
Elgar was born in New Orleans, Louisiana on June 13, 1879. He played violin as a child from age 5. He also played trumpet. He studied music in Wisconsin and Illinois.

== Later life and career ==
Elgar played in Chicago from 1903 with the Bloom Theater Philharmonic Orchestra, returning to New Orleans late in the decade of the 1900s until about 1913, when he returned to Chicago. He put together a band in Chicago in 1913. His band played at the Navy Pier Ballroom, Hattie Harmon's Dreamland Ballroom from 1917 until 1922 and opened the old Savoy Ballroom in 1928. This band toured in the revue Plantation Days and traveled to London, though Elgar did not accompany it on this trip. However, he did play with Will Marion Cook's Orchestra in Europe. He led later bands in Milwaukee, 1925–1928, making several recordings with Elgars Creole Orchestra that he led at the Wisconsin Roof Gardens in Milwaukee and again in Chicago, 1926-30.

His sidemen included Manuel Perez, Lorenzo Tio, Louis Cottrell, Jr., Barney Bigard, Darnell Howard, and Omer Simeon. He made four recordings as leader of the Creole Orchestra. He concentrated on teaching in the 1930s, and worked as a union official later in his life. He was a founder and charter member of the local branch of the American Federation of Musicians, AFL-CIO, Local 2018. He died in Chicago in August 1973.
