= Leo Sarkisian =

American ethnomusicologist and broadcaster (1921–2018)

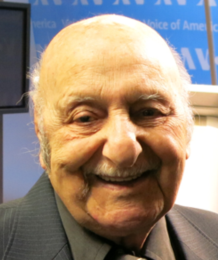
- Leo Sarkisian in 2014
- Born: January 4, 1921
- Died: June 8, 2018 (aged 97)
- Presenting career
- Show: Music Time in Africa (1965–1985)
- Network: Voice of America

Leo Sarkisian (January 4, 1921 – June 8, 2018) was an American ethnomusicologist and broadcaster for Voice of America radio. He is known for his work to showcase African music through the Music Time in Africa radio program.

Sarkisian was born in Lawrence, Massachusetts, the son of an Armenian refugee from the Ottoman Empire. He travelled in North Africa and Europe for US military intelligence during World War II, and while working as a textbook illustrator after the war he was recruited by Irving Fogel to work for his company Tempo Records in Hollywood. Fogel made him Director of International Music Production and sent him to work in radio in various countries in Asia and Africa.

Sarkisian was offered a job with Voice of America by broadcaster Edward R. Murrow in 1961, while in Conakry. At the time, Murrow was the head of the United States Information Agency (USIA) and he heard about Sarkisian through his West African recording trips. Sarkisian accepted the offer and started working for Voice of America in Monrovia, Liberia. Two years later, in 1965, Leo launched Music Time in Africa, a "weekly program that features traditional and contemporary music from all of Africa."

Sarkisian retired from VOA in 2012, at age 91. In 2014, Sarkisian donated his extensive collection of African music to the University of Michigan.
