= Novachord =

Keyboard electronic music synthesizer (1939–1942)

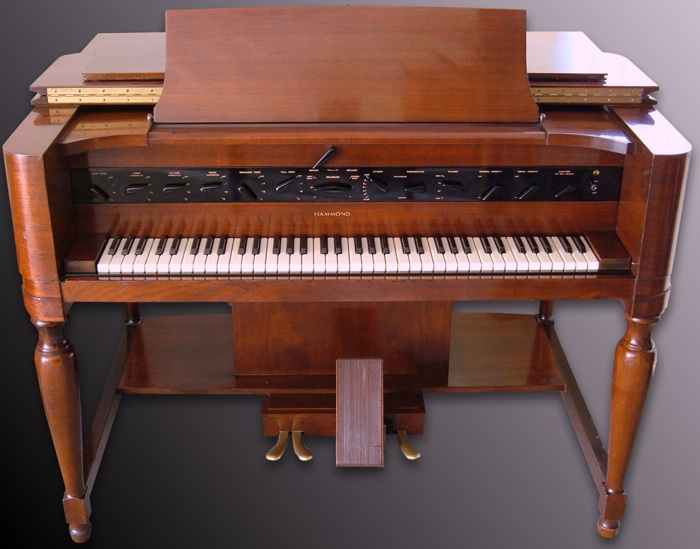
- Hammond Novachord
- Manufacturer: Hammond
- Dates: 1939–1942

Technical specifications
- Polyphony: 72 voices
- Oscillator: 12-semitone oscillators + 5-octave dividers
- LFO: 6-channel electromechanical vibrato
- Synthesis type: Subtractive analogue
- Filter: Three bandpass filters, one lowpass filter, one highpass filter (in parallel with fixed frequency)
- Attenuator: Envelope with seven preset shapes
- Hardware: Vacuum tubes

Input/output
- Keyboard: 72 notes

The Novachord is the world's first commercial polyphonic synthesizer. Incorporating many circuit and control elements found in modern synthesizers, and using subtractive synthesis to generate tones, it was designed by John M. Hanert, Laurens Hammond and C. N. Williams, and was manufactured by the Hammond company. Only 1,069 Novachords were built over a period from 1939 to 1942. It was one of very few electronic products released by Hammond that was not intended to emulate the sound of an organ.

== History of production ==
While production of the Novachord began in November 1938, it was first heard at the 1939 New York World's Fair. The Novachord Orchestra of Ferde Grofé performed daily at the Ford stand with four Novachords and a Hammond Organ. The first instrument was delivered to President Franklin D. Roosevelt on January 30, 1940 as a birthday present.

The Novachord was not well-suited to the technique of organists or pianists and required frequent adjustments to controls on the front panel to create new sounds. Like many later analog synthesizers, it was much better-suited to producing "otherworldly" timbres. The instrument found its niche some years after production, shaping the sound of many science fiction film and television scores.

Production stopped because of a shortage of parts in 1942 and poor sales kept it from being built after the war. It is estimated that fewer than 200 Novachords are still in existence and considerably fewer are still in operation. The vast majority of surviving examples are in North America, although one is known to be in the United Kingdom. As of November 2017, there is one in Australia.

== Technical details ==
Containing 163 vacuum tubes and over 1,000 custom capacitors, the Novachord weighed nearly 500 pounds and was roughly the size of two spinet pianos. The divide-down oscillator architecture, based on vacuum-tube monostable circuits, permitted all 72 notes to be played polyphonically by deriving several octaves of notes from twelve L–C tuned top-octave oscillators. Only one tetrode per lower note was needed. A basically similar design was adopted in both combo organs and polyphonic synthesizers released more than 30 years later such as the Polymoog.

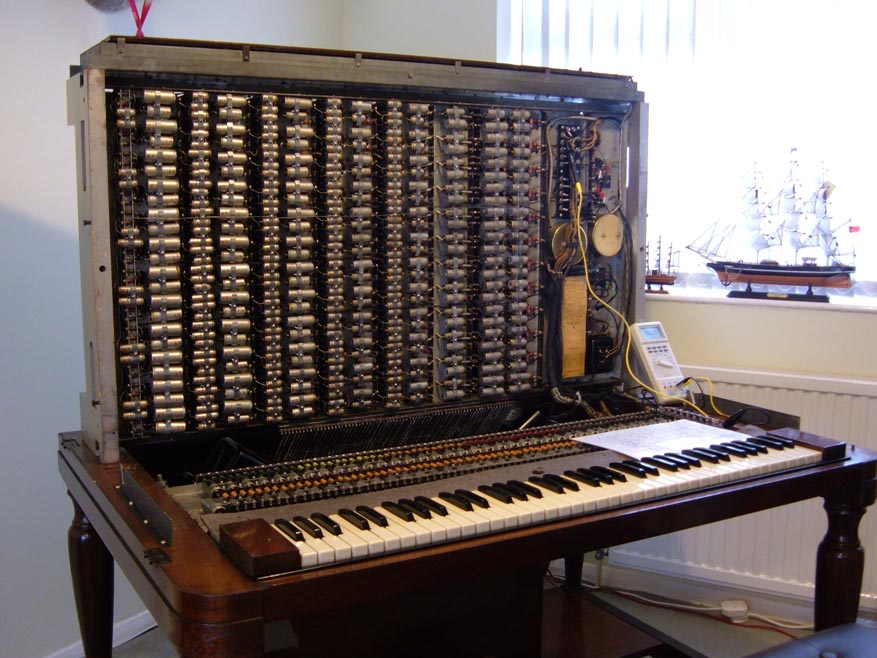
Inside the Novachord

The Novachord featured an early implementation of envelope generators, with seven attack/decay/sustain envelope shapes selectable by a rotary switch and release time controlled by the sustain pedal. It also utilized three parallel band-pass filters, one lowpass filter, and one highpass filter with fixed cutoff frequencies per voice and an electro-mechanical 6-channel vibrato unit operating on pairs of adjacent oscillators. Each channel's vibrato frequency (~7 Hz) differed slightly. The oscillator inductors used cores mounted on flat springs.

The resulting sonic palette ranged from dense, sustained string- and vocal-like timbres to the sharp attack transients of a harpsichord or piano.

Despite its historical importance, the Novachord did not enjoy commercial success. That was partly due to instability problems, as well as the onset of World War II limiting the availability of parts and decreasing demand. The poor reliability was mainly the result of the tight tolerances of the operating parameters of hundreds of custom components. Hammond soon offered a special upgrade to improve stability, which was no more than a low-power heater bolted inside the enclosure to reduce the effects of humidity. The instrument was not known for vacuum tube failure perhaps because the heater voltage was reduced from the typical 6.3 volts to 5 volts.

== Appearances in contemporary media ==
Like its contemporaries, the Theremin, the Ondes Martenot and the Trautonium, the Novachord can be heard occasionally in horror and science fiction film scores including many genre films from Universal Studios and James Bernard's ethereal music for Hammer's The Gorgon (1964). Jerry Goldsmith used the Novachord in several of his film scores and is known to have held the instrument in high regard. It was also used for the entr'acte music in Gone With the Wind (1939). Composer Heitor Villa-Lobos included a part for the Novachord in his Symphony Nº. 7 (1945). In December 1939, Kurt Weill wrote incidental music for Elmer Rice's comedy Two on an Island for Novachord solo. Hanns Eisler used the Novachord in his Kammersinfonie op. 69 (1940). Dimitri Tiomkin used the Novachord to create the unusual percussion quality for "The Ballad of High Noon", the Oscar-winning opening song in the 1952 film High Noon. Other films with soundtracks featuring the Novachord include This Island Earth, Cat People, and Alfred Hitchcock's Rebecca; it also appeared in the soundtracks of television series such as The Twilight Zone, One Step Beyond, The Outer Limits, and Hawaii Five-O.

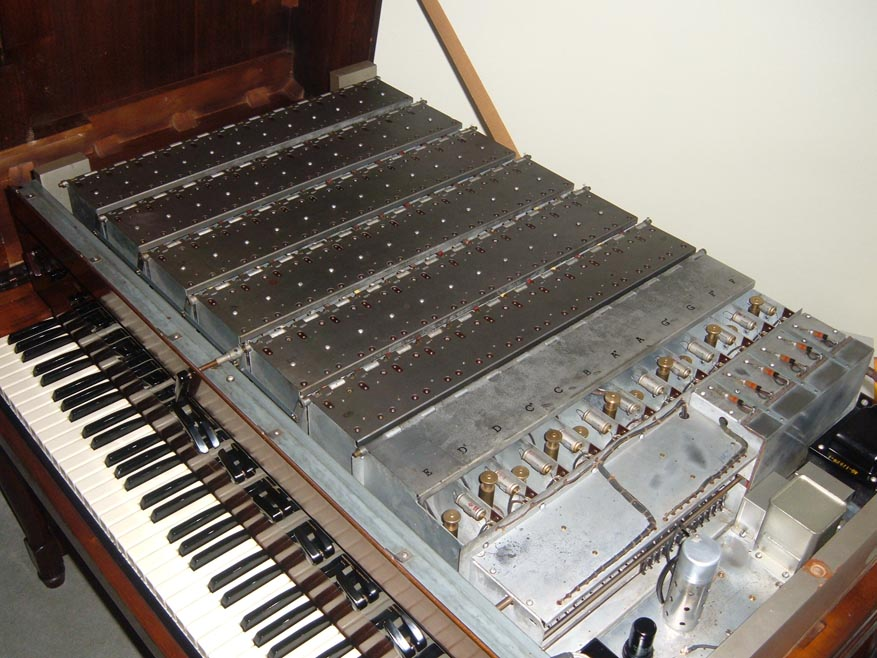
The 12 master oscillator tuning chokes

The Novachord can be heard on many recordings of the era. Many songs sung by Vera Lynn, including the original 1939 version of "We'll Meet Again", were accompanied by Arthur Young on the Novachord. One of the most notable recordings to feature the Novachord is Brother Bones' 1949 recording of "Sweet Georgia Brown" on Tempo Records. The Novachord is used for the bass line on that track, but can be more prominently heard on the B side of the record playing the melody on "Margie". American jazz musician Slim Gaillard and his Quartette also recorded with the instrument on their 1947 instrumental release "Novachord Boogie" (Parlophone R 3035)

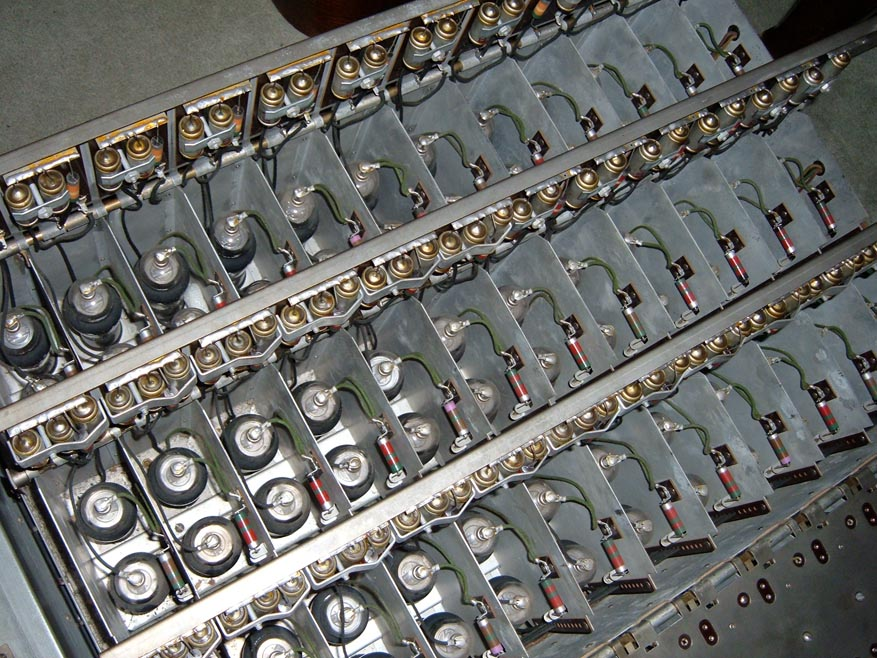
Section of the VCA/Divider pair tube array
