= Sana Nagano =

Jazz violinist from Brooklyn

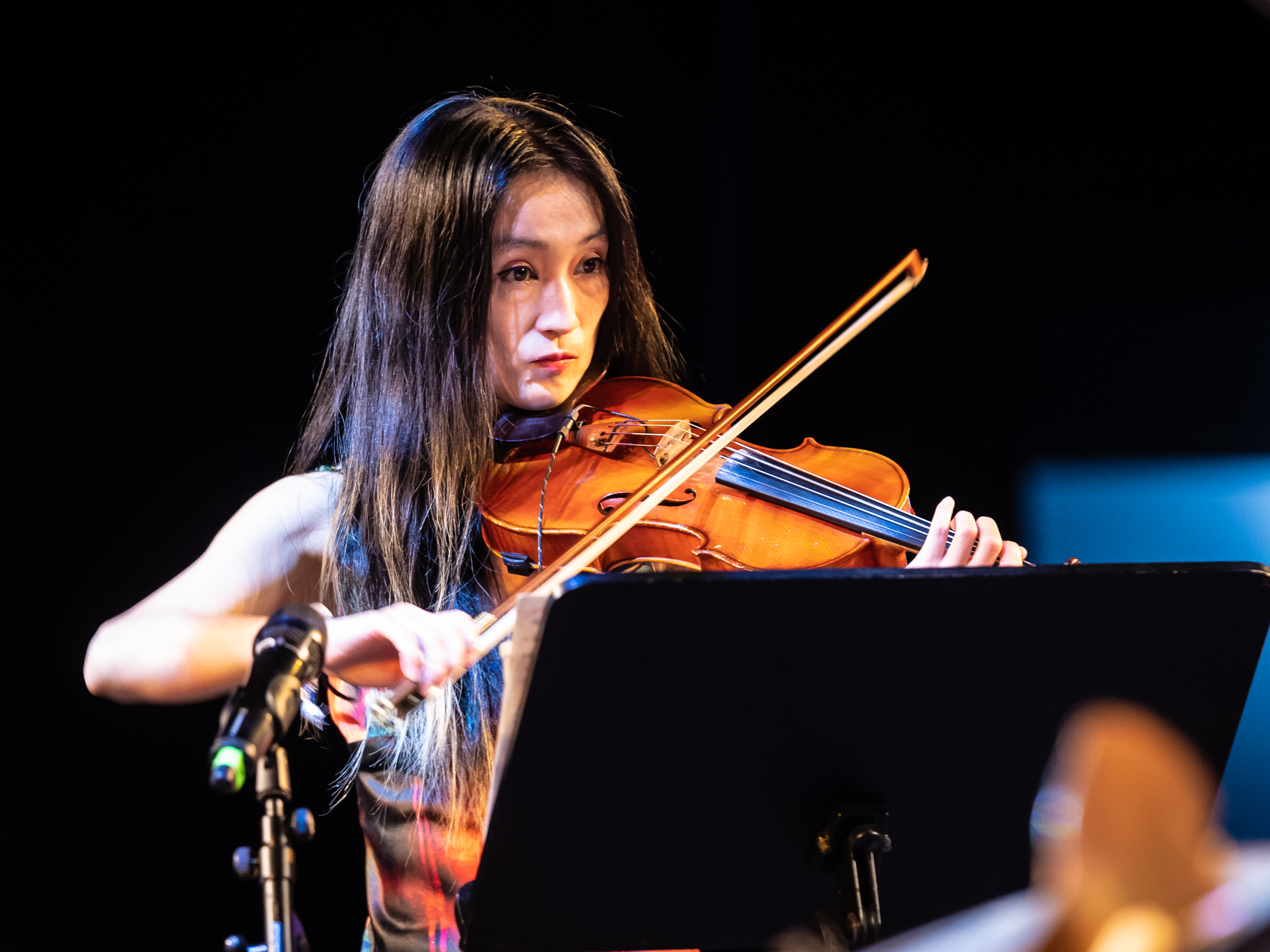
Sana Nagano at the Moers Festival 2022

Sana Nagano is a Japanese-born jazz violinist, composer and arranger based in Brooklyn, New York. She started learning violin at the age of three and continued her education first in Japan, and then in the United States. She earned performance and composition degrees from the Berklee College of Music and the Aaron Copland School of Music of Queens College, and has been performing with such musicians as Karl Berger, Billy Martin, Peter Apfelbaum and Ken Filiano.

Her avant-garde noise album Smashing Humans in which Nagano debuted as a bandleader contains elements of experimentation and received favorable reviews.

== Discography ==
Year	Title	Artist	Label
2014	Inside the Rainbow	Sana Nagano	Sana Nagano
2021	Smashing Humans	Sana Nagano	577 Records
2022	Anime Mundi	Sana Nagano	577 Records
2023	Peach and Tomato	Sana Nagano, Leonor Falcón	577 Records
