= Daniel Garlitsky =

Russian violinist and conductor (born 1982)

- Born: Daniil Borisovič Garlickij; September 8, 1982 (age 43); Moscow, Soviet Union,
- Genres: Classical, Jazz
- Occupation: Violinist
- Instrument: Violin
- Website: www.garlitsky.com

Daniel Garlitsky (born September 8, 1982, in Moscow) is a Russian violinist and conductor.

== Performer ==
Daniel Garlitsky is descendant of a lineage of famous Russian violinists and pedagogues. His grandfather, Mikhail Garlitsky, was the founder of the "Step by step" violin method. His father, Boris, winner of the Paganini competition, served as concertmaster of the Moscow Virtuosi orchestra and later of the London Philharmonic Orchestra.

Born in Moscow, Daniel Garlitsky began his musical studies (violin and piano) at the "Specialised Gnessin School of Music" at the age of 6. Having settled in France in the early 90s, he continued his tuition at the Lyon Conservatory and, graduating with highest distinctions.

In 1999 Daniel Garlitsky became a student of the prestigious Conservatoire National Supérieur de Musique et de Danse de Paris. Eager to broaden his musical knowledge, Garlitsky has followed classes of harmony, composition, orchestration, conducting and Indian music. He graduated cum laude and was awarded a special prize for outstanding performance given during his final recital.

For over two decades, Daniel Garlitsky has been performing a wide variety kind of music worldwide. As a soloist, he has shared the stage with such orchestras as the Hamburg Philharmonic, Wurttemberg Philharmonic, Kanagawa State Orchestra, Orchestra of the Age of Enlightenment, Vienna Chamber Orchestra and many others. He has performed under the baton of such conductors as Vladimir Jurowski, Michiyoshi Inoue, Dmitry Sitkovetsky and Christoph Eberle. His chamber music partners have included Gidon Kremer, Maria Joao Pires, Oleg Maisenberg, Augustin Dumay, Antoine Tamestit, amongst others.

Daniel Garlitsky has often been invited to guest lead European top class orchestras such as " Residentie Orkest " (The Hague), Hamburger Symphoniker, Münchner Rundfunkorchester, Liege Philharmonic and Strasbourg Philharmonic.

Daniel Garlitsky's wide repertoire ranges from early baroque (Monteverdi, Marais, Lully, etc....), that he performs on period instruments, to 21st century compositions. During his career, Daniel Garlitsky has performed and premiered works by French composers (Philippe Hersant, Thierry Escaich, Olivier Greif...) as well as internationally renowned composers such as John Adams, Philip Glass, Arvo Pärt, Giya Kancheli and Mark O'Connor, amongst others.

Always willing to break borders between different forms of art, Garlitsky has worked closely with the acclaimed choreographer John Neumeier and the Hamburg Ballet. In "Orpheus" (2011–2012), Daniel Garlitsky has portrayed the mirror of the title role, performing works by Biber and Stravinsky on stage. He has also performed Philip Glass's violin concerto n°2 for the ballet "Renku" (2013).

In 2014 Daniel Garlitsky revived the "Tchaïkovsky String Quartet" taking over as its 1st violin during the Baltic States Tour. In the 1930s the same position was held by his grandfather, Mikhaïl.

== Pedagogue ==
Education has always been an important part in Daniel Garlitsky's life. He currently teaches the violin at the Paris Conservatory (CNSMDP) and is invited to give lectures and master classes in Europe (Germany, Italy, France, Portugal...) and Asia (Korea, Japan, Singapore, Thailand...).

Furthermore, Daniel Garlitsky is regularly invited to coach, conduct or perform with youth orchestras such as Collegio Moderno (Portugal), Orchesterzentrum NWR (Germany), Orchestre Français des Jeunes (France). In 2007, Daniel Garlitsky has led and conducted the Kremerata Baltica Chamber Orchestra, performing in Europe (Zürich Tonhalle, Rudolfinum Prague, Berliner Philharmonie) and Japan (Suntory Hall).

== Composer ==
Aside from being an accomplished performer and pedagogue, Mr Garlitsky is also a skilled composer and arranger. During the past 10 years, Daniel Garlitsky has been approached by different film directors and has composed, arranged and recorded various soundtracks including an original score for On love a short film by an award writer/director Eugene Izraylit, based on a poem by Joseph Brodsky. Mr Garlitsky has also recorded the soundtrack of Au temps de Maupassant , a French TV-series and has occasionally coached actors to successfully portray violinists.

Daniel Garlitsky has also arranged tracks for the Russian rock musician Boris Grebenshchikov.

== Instruments ==
Daniel Garlitsky plays an 18th-century Italian violin labeled Joseph Guarnerius, filius Andreæ and a French violin made for him in 2003 by Jacques Fustier.
