= Eddie South =

American jazz violinist (1904–1962)

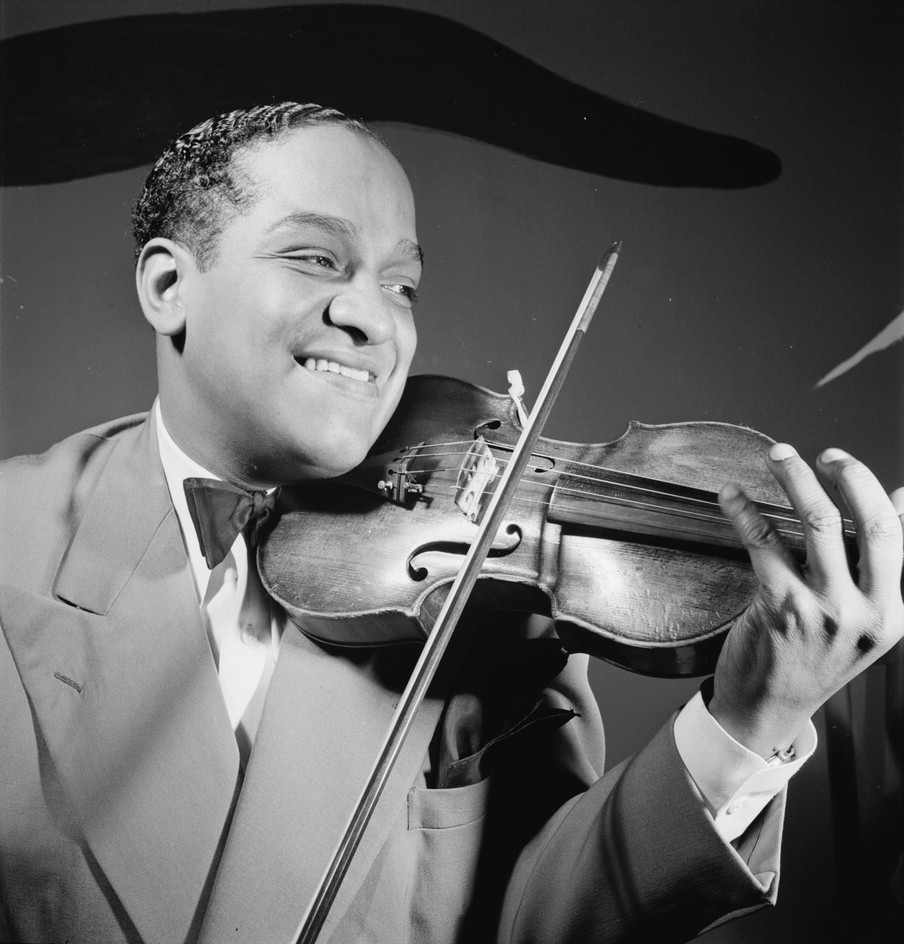

Background information
- Born: Edward Otha South; November 27, 1904; Louisiana, Missouri, U.S.
- Died: April 25, 1962 (aged 57) Chicago, Illinois, U.S.
- Genre: Jazz
- Occupation: Musician
- Instrument: Violin

Edward Otha South (November 27, 1904 – April 25, 1962) was an American jazz violinist.

== Biography ==
Born in Louisiana, Missouri, South studied classical music in Budapest, Paris, and Chicago. He turned to jazz because, as a Black musician, there was no room for him in classical music. In the 1920s he was a member of jazz orchestras led by Charlie Elgar, Erskine Tate, and Jimmy Wade. From 1928 to 1930, he was touring in Europe with his band, Eddie South's Alabamians, with whom he had already made several records. He recorded during this tour as well. During this tour, the Alabamians had an extended stay in Venice, in 1928, at the Luna Hotel.

He led a band in the early 1930s that included Milt Hinton and Everett Barksdale. In 1937 he recorded in Paris with Stephane Grappelli, Django Reinhardt, and Michel Warlop. In 1945 he worked for the studio band at WMGM in New York City. During the 1950s, he was a guest on television with Fran Allison and Dave Garroway and on WGN in Chicago.

On September 2, 2020, The New York Times consulted violinist Mazz Swift, who selected Eddie South's performance of "Black Gypsy" for a feature on "5 Minutes That Will Make You Love the Violin."

== Discography ==
- 1923-37 - The Chronological (Classics 707, ?)
- 1937-41 - The Chronological (Classics 737, ?)
- 1944 - The Dark Angel of the Fiddle (Trip/Soundies, ?)
- 1940-47 - Broadcasts, Film and Fugitive (AB Fable, 2005)
- 1940-46 - Dark Angel Album Sets (AB Fable, 2008) (Columbia, PIloton and Gold Seal recordings)
- 1953 - South Side Jazz (Chess, 1971)
- 1958 - The Distinguished Violin of Eddie South (Mercury,1959)
- 1959 - Music for the Birds (Wing, 1962) With Mike Simpson

== Bibliography ==
- Barnett, Anthony (1999). Black Gypsy: The Recordings of Eddie South: An Annotated Discography. Lewes, East Sussex: AB Fable. ISBN 0-907954-26-X.
