= Tempo Records (US) =

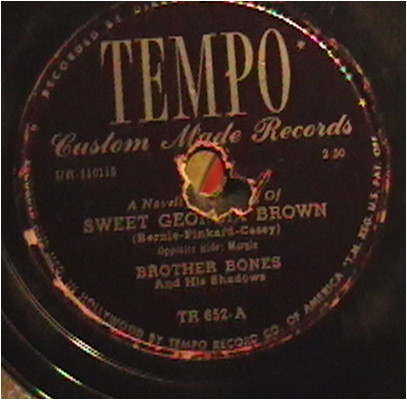
- Country of origin: United States
- Location: Hollywood, California

Tempo Records was a mid-20th century United States–based record label headquartered in Hollywood, California. It was run by Irving Fogel. Tempo bridged the 78 rpm, 45 rpm and 33⅓ rpm generations, releasing discs in all three formats.

Tempo's roster included jazz harpist Robert Maxwell, pianist Mel Henke, cornetist Doc Evans, clarinetist Sid Phillips, Novachord virtuoso Lloyd Sloop, violinist Joe Venuti, Hammond organist Herb Kern, and pianist Ben Light.

Tempo released the 1949 version of "Sweet Georgia Brown" by Brother Bones and His Shadows which was used as the theme song for the Harlem Globetrotters basketball team.

Tempo also produced music for the film industry, and Fogel recruited the ethnomusicologist Leo Sarkisian, making him Director of International Music Production and sending him to various countries in Asia and Africa.

== Tempo Records (Impact) ==
Tempo was also the name of a gospel record label in the late 1960s and early 1970s through approximately 1980 at the time they closed down the company. They were, for at least part of their existence, the contemporary arm of Impact Records, known formally as Tempo/Impact. It was based in Nashville, Tennessee, and for a brief time also had a base in Shawnee Mission, Kansas. Some musicians who appeared on the Tempo of Kansas City label included The Hawaiians, Kathie Lee Johnson (Gifford), Stephanie Boosahda, Jim Sunderwirth, Pat Terry Group, Hope of Glory, Haven of Rest Quartet, Sue Ellen Chenault, Otis Skillings and The Couriers. This label had a mis-mash of styles from traditional Southern Gospel, inspirational artists, early Jesus Music, Instrumental and Contemporary Christian music artists.

== See also ==
- List of record labels
- Tempo Records (UK)
