= Joe Venuti =

American jazz violinist (1903–1978)

- Venuti in 1971

Background information
- Born: Giuseppe Venuti; September 16, 1903; Philadelphia, Pennsylvania, U.S.
- Died: August 14, 1978 (aged 74) Seattle, Washington, U.S.
- Genre: Jazz
- Occupation: Musician
- Instrument: Violin
- Works: Discography
- Years active: 1920s–1978
- Labels: Columbia; Okeh; Decca; Tempo; Chiaroscuro; Everest

Giuseppe "Joe" Venuti (September 16, 1903 – August 14, 1978) was an American jazz violinist, a pioneer on the instrument in that style.

Considered the father of jazz violin, he pioneered the use of string instruments in jazz along with the guitarist Eddie Lang, a friend since childhood. Through the 1920s and early 1930s, Venuti and Lang made many recordings as leaders and as featured soloists. He and Lang became so well known for their "hot" violin and guitar solos that on many commercial dance recordings, they were hired to do 12- or 24-bar duos towards the end of otherwise stock dance arrangements. In 1926, Venuti and Lang began recording for the OKeh label as a duet (after one duet issued on Columbia), followed by "Blue Four" combinations, which are considered milestone jazz recordings. Venuti also recorded commercial dance records for OKeh under the name "New Yorkers".

He worked with Benny Goodman, Adrian Rollini, the Dorsey Brothers, Bing Crosby, Bix Beiderbecke, Jack Teagarden, Frank Signorelli, the Boswell Sisters, and most of the other important white jazz and semi-jazz figures of the late 1920s and early 1930s. However, following Lang's death in 1933, Venuti's career began to wane, though he continued performing through the 1930s, recording a series of commercial dance records (usually containing a Venuti violin solo) for the dime store labels, as well as OKeh and Columbia, plus the occasional jazz small group sessions. He was also a strong early influence on western swing players like Cecil Brower. Many of the 1920s OKeh sides continued to sell and remained in print through 1935, when ARC discontinued the OKeh label and reissued selected sides on the 35-cent Vocalion label. (The OKeh label was revived by CBS in 1940.)

After a period of relative obscurity in the 1940s and 1950s, Venuti played violin and other instruments with Jack Statham at the Desert Inn Hotel in Las Vegas. Statham headed several musical groups that played at the Desert Inn from late 1961 until 1965, including a Dixieland combo. Venuti was with him during that time, and was active with the Las Vegas Symphony Orchestra during the 1960s. He was 'rediscovered' in the late 1960s. In the 1970s, he established a musical relationship with tenor saxophonist Zoot Sims resulting in three recordings. In 1976, he recorded an album of duets with pianist Earl Hines entitled Hot Sonatas. He also recorded an entire album with country-jazz musicians including mandolinist Jethro Burns (of Homer & Jethro), pedal steel guitarist Curly Chalker and former Bob Wills sideman and guitarist Eldon Shamblin. Venuti died in Seattle, Washington.

== Early life ==
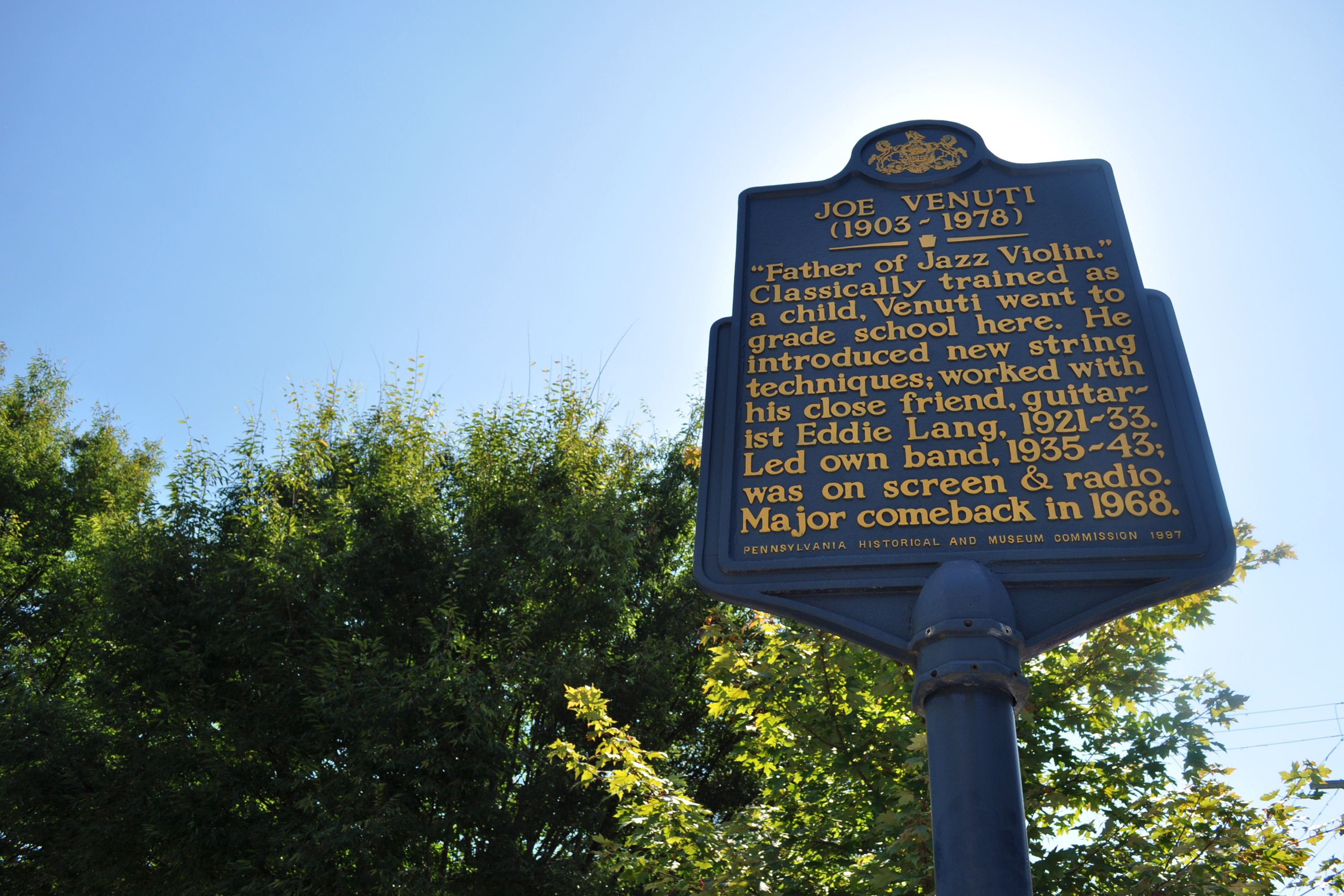
Joe Venuti Historical Marker, 8th and Fitzwater Streets, Philadelphia

Venuti was well known for giving out conflicting information regarding his early life, including his birthplace and birth date as well as his education and upbringing. The author and critic Gary Giddins summarized the situation by saying,

Depending on which reference book you consult, (Venuti's age when he died in 1978) was eighty-four, eighty-two, eighty, seventy-five, seventy-four, or seventy-two. Venuti, who surely had one of the strangest senses of humor in music history, encouraged the confusion. [...] The deception has been variously traced to Venuti's father, who hoped to speed up the naturalization process, to Joe's fear that a foreign-born jazz musician would not be taken seriously by his peers, and to his general penchant for mayhem.

According to official records, he was born on September 16, 1903, in Philadelphia.

Venuti was classically trained on the violin from a young age and studied solfège with his grandfather. He later said that while he studied music from him, he did not learn any one instrument but rather music theory in general. He began studying the violin in Philadelphia and later claimed to have studied at a conservatory, without providing any corroborating details. Despite this, his style of playing was characteristic of someone who had a solid basis in violin technique.

== Career ==
Venuti began playing violin professionally in 1924. During this time, he helped redefine jazz violin. He spent time in the early 1900s playing in the James Campbell School Orchestra in the violin section. It was there that he first met and befriended Eddie Lang (known by his birth name, Salvatore Massaro), who was also playing in the same section, and the pair began experimenting with jazz and blues in addition to classical playing.

Venuti and Eddie Lang performing their duet "Wild Cat" with Paul Whiteman's Orchestra; excerpt from the 1930 film King of Jazz. The other two selections in the video, played by a sextet of violinists, are Fritz Kreisler's "Caprice Viennoise" and "Tambourin Chinois".

In 1924, Venuti moved to Detroit to join Jean Goldkette's band, and he began playing with the Book Cadillac Hotel Orchestra, one of Goldkette's dance bands. It was here that he made his first recordings with Goldkette's big band. By mid-1925, he had moved to Atlantic City briefly to play with Bert Estlow's band before settling in New York. Here, he once again encountered Lang, who had switched from the violin to the guitar. The two friends struck up a professional partnership which was to last until Lang's death in 1933. They began playing with Roger Wolfe Kahn's dance orchestras in addition to playing in Broadway pit orchestras to support themselves.

From 1926 to 1928, the Venuti–Lang duo were recording with most of the leading jazz musicians of the day, including Goldkette (1926–27), Red Nichols (1927–28), Bix Beiderbecke (1927), Adrian Rollini (1927), and Frankie Trumbauer (1927). Between 1927 and 1929, Lang and Venuti were leading bands and performing in Atlantic City. Venuti then returned to New York in 1929 to play with Paul Whiteman's orchestra from 1929 to 1931. He also appeared in the film King of Jazz (1930) with the band. In 1931–1933, Venuti recorded again with Lang, Bix Beiderbecke, and Frankie Trumbauer. The most famous recording of Venuti's career was also produced during this time: his October 22, 1931, recording as Joe Venuti–Eddie Lang and Their All Star Orchestra. This session also included Benny Goodman and Jack Teagarden. Both Venuti and Lang rejoined Roger Wolfe Kahn's orchestra in 1932 and played and recorded with him until Lang's death in 1933.

Following Eddie Lang's death, Venuti conducted a tour of Europe and the UK. During this period, he also alternated between violin to guitar, varying from his almost strictly violin approach formerly. Upon returning to the U.S. in 1935, he formed a big band and worked as its leader. During this time he also composed most of his original arrangements. Venuti was less successful as a big band leader than as a soloist, and the band folded in 1943.

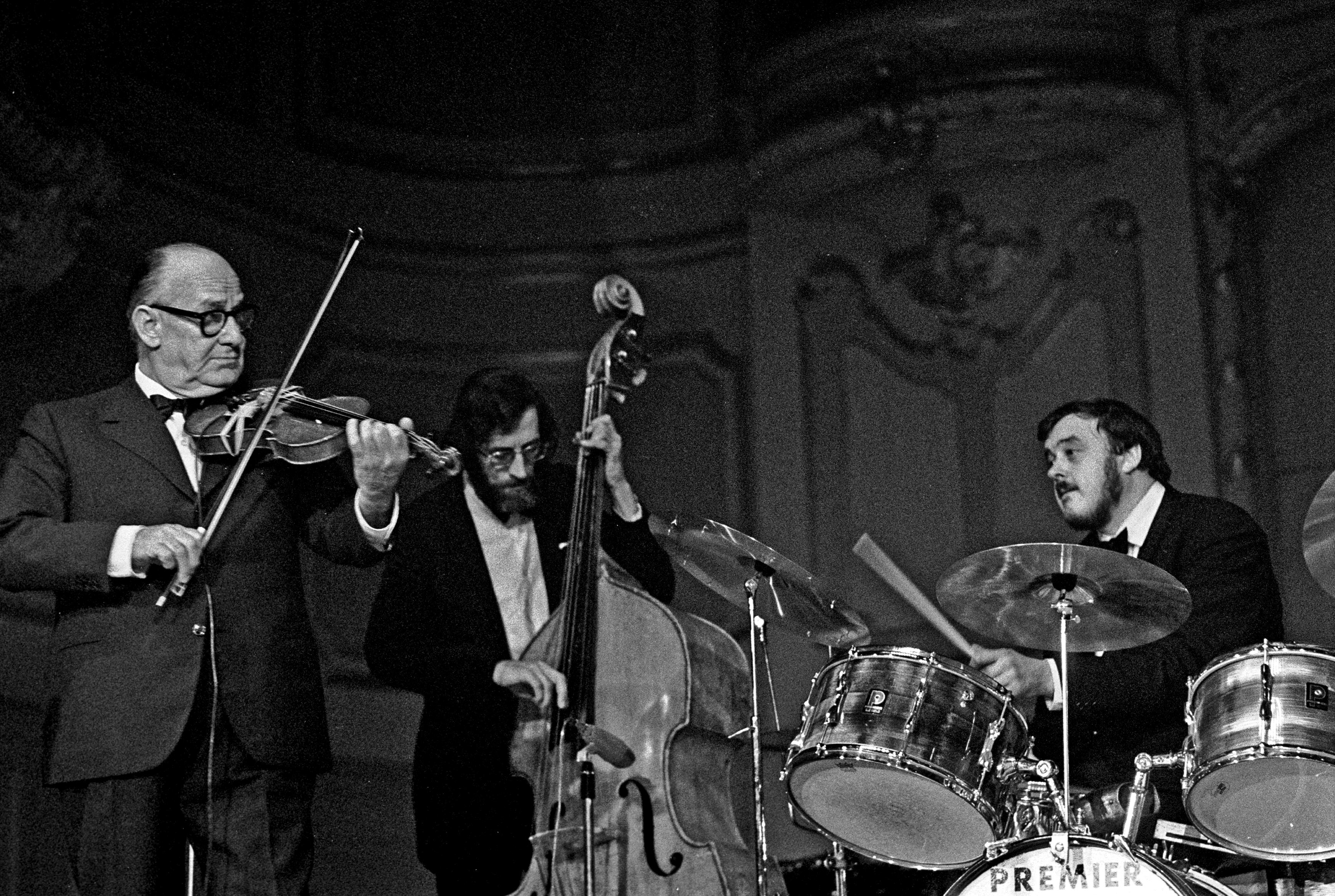
Venuti at the Musikhalle, Hamburg, 1971

After this period, Venuti transitioned from being in a position of relative prominence to one of ignominy. Venuti moved to California in 1944 to become a studio musician with MGM, in addition to playing with other film and radio studios. He also appeared regularly on Bing Crosby's radio show during this time. Later, Venuti returned to a small-group format and continued to play and record in and around Los Angeles, while touring frequently. In 1953, he conducted another tour of Europe, and in 1963, a tour of Seattle.

Throughout much of the 1950s, Venuti made records and played at clubs. This was the beginning of about a 15-year lull in his career. In the early 1960s, Venuti was mostly inactive due to alcoholism. The late 1960s marked a revival in his career. In 1967, he was invited to perform at Dick Gibson's Colorado Jazz Party, and was such a success that he would be asked to repeat his performances annually until his death in 1978. In 1968, he was also invited to the Newport Jazz Festival, and in 1969 he performed at the London Jazz Expo.

Living in Seattle in 1973, he was featured in the short film, Thank You Joe. A portion of the film was shot at the District Tavern in Seattle with Venuti sitting in with the New Deal Rhythm band led by John Holte.

During the 1970s, in his last years, Venuti toured extensively in Europe with a small ensemble and, meanwhile, made his final recordings with Earl Hines, George Barnes, Ross Tompkins, Dave McKenna, Marian McPartland, Scott Hamilton, Leon Redbone, and Zoot Sims. He continued to tour and play until his death in 1978.

=== Playing style ===
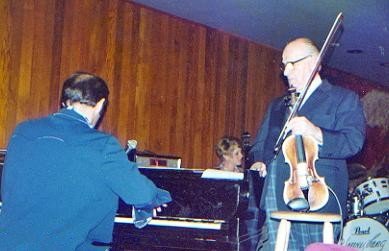
Venuti with the Bubba Kolb Trio at the Village Jazz Lounge, Walt Disney World, in 1978

Venuti pioneered the violin as a solo instrument to the jazz world. He was known for a fast, "hot" playing style characteristic of jazz soloists in the 1920s. His solos have been described as incredibly rhythmic with patterns of duplets and running eighth and sixteenth notes. He favored a lively, fast tempo that showed off his superior technique. Venuti was a virtuosic player with a wide range of techniques, including left-hand pizzicato and runs spanning the length of the fingerboard.

He also frequently implemented slides common in blues and country fiddle playing. Occasionally, he used an uncommon technique in which he unscrewed the end of his bow and wrapped the bow hair around the strings of the violin, allowing him to play chords, lending the subsequent sound a "wild" tone. He was particularly active in small ensemble jazz, since – prior to the invention of the musical amplifier – the force of the horns in big band jazz was sufficient to drown out the violin.

== Compositions ==
Venuti's compositions included "Satan's Holiday", "Goin' Home", "Put and Take", "Pretty Trix", "Doin' Things" (with Eddie Lang), "Apple Blossoms" (with Lennie Hayton, Frankie Trumbauer, and Eddie Lang), "Beatin' the Dog", "Black and Blue Bottom", "Black Satin", "Blues for Nobody", "Blues in G", "Blues Inc.", "Dandy Cat", "Cheese and Crackers", "Clown Cat", "Dinner at Nine", "Flip", and "Betcha I Getcha" (which Venuti claimed to have co-written with Bix Beiderbecke).

== Practical jokes ==
Apart from his impressive playing style, Joe Venuti was known for his practical jokes. He was known to play inexpensive violins, since many of his former band members have said that he had been known to crack these over the heads of other musicians on occasion. There are many anecdotes of his pranks told by his associates. In one account, he filled a tuba player's horn with flour during a break in a rehearsal. Another involved sending the one-armed trumpeter Wingy Manone a single cufflink for Christmas. He was also well known for having called every bassist in the New York phonebook and asking them to meet with him on a street corner. When over 50 bass players arrived with their instruments, it created a minor roadblock. He subsequently had to pay the players for their time as mandated by the American Federation of Musicians. Venuti once tipped an inebriated and unconscious Bix Beiderbecke into a bath filled with purple jello.

== Personal life and death ==
Little is known about Venuti's personal life aside from his extensive jazz career. Some of his many biographers claim that he was married three times. In a 1934 passenger list, he is stated traveling with his wife Sarah Venuti (née Israel); they got married in August 1934. Wingy Manone reported that Venuti was married to a woman named "Sally", and in 1950, the Los Angeles Times reported on his divorce from a woman named "Dorothy".

Venuti suffered from alcoholism in his middle age, throughout the 1950s and early 1960s. He was able to recover and to regain his former acclaim for his playing. In 1970, Venuti was diagnosed with cancer. He died on August 14, 1978, in Seattle, Washington, of either cancer or a heart attack.
