= Adam Taubitz =

German jazz and classical musician

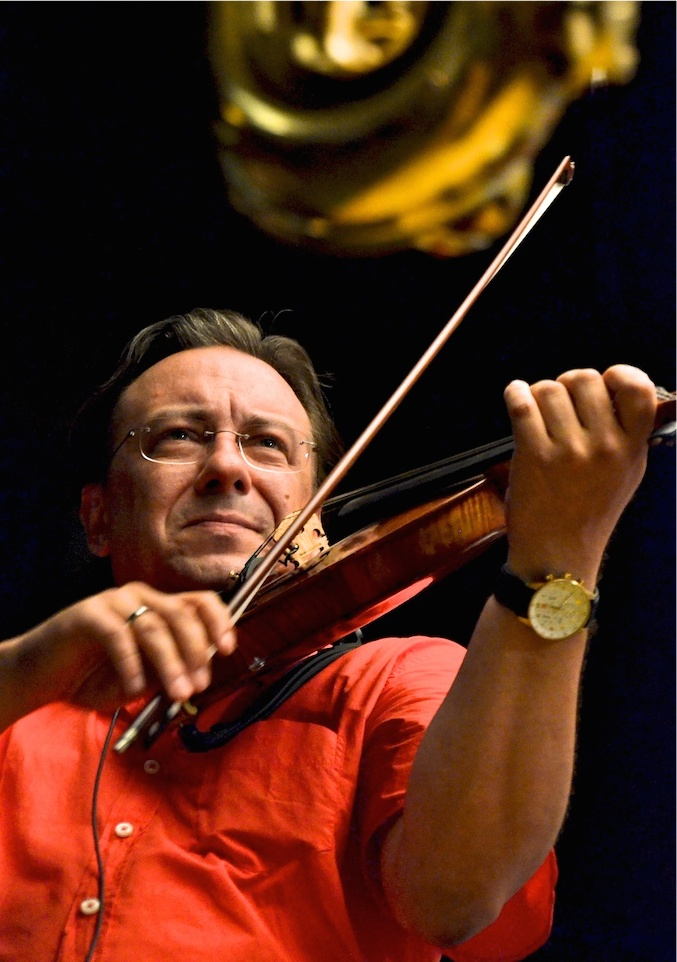

Background information
- Birth name: Adam Georg Taubitz
- Born: 7 October 1967 (age 57); Chorzów, Upper Silesia, Poland
- Genres: Jazz, jazz fusion, classical
- Occupation: Musician
- Instrument(s): Violin, trumpet, flugelhorn, guitar
- Labels: TCB Records, EMI, Enja
- Website: adamtaubitz.com

Adam Georg Taubitz (born 7 October 1967) is a German jazz and classical musician. He is perhaps best known for his work with the Berlin Philharmonic Jazz Group, which he established in 1999, and with the Aura Quartett.

== Life ==
Adam's father started teaching him playing the violin when he was 5, and he joined the Silesian Philharmonic six years later, then continued his studies in Freiburg im Breisgau with Wolfgang Marschner.

In 1989 he became 1st Concertmaster of the Basel Radio Symphony Orchestra under Nello Santi. In 1992 he became artistic director of the Basel Chamber Symphony, and he founded the Camerata de Sa Nostra in Palma de Mallorca in 1994. From 1997 he was Principal 2nd Violinist in the Berlin Philharmonic under Claudio Abbado.

Although always very interested in many different styles of music, jazz was his biggest passion and he began learning to play the trumpet and playing jazz. In 1999 he founded The Berlin Philharmonic Jazz Group. With this group he played -and still does- as a soloist on the trumpet and the violin in Europe and the Far East. He is also a member of the Absolute Ensemble New York City (leader Kristjan Järvi) and 1st Violin of the Aura Quartett Basel, which toured Indonesia in 2011.

Taubitz has made numerous recordings as a soloist and as a jazz-musician, and has played together with Kirk Lightsey, Philip Catherine, Famoudou Don Moye, Julio Barreto, David Klein, Andy Scherrer, Emmanuel Pahud, Makaya Ntshoko, Gérard Wyss, Kai Rautenberg, Domenic Landolf, Daniel Schnyder, Thomas Quasthoff, Ole Edvard Antonsen, Angelika Milster, Dieter Hallervorden, Thomas Hampson and Nigel Kennedy.

== Quotes ==
"What Taubitz, however, far exceeds the achievements of his classical academic career is his almost astounding mastery in improvising, which must by no means shy away from a comparison with the few really outstanding jazz violinists!" […] - Dieter Ulrich

== Jazz and pop ==
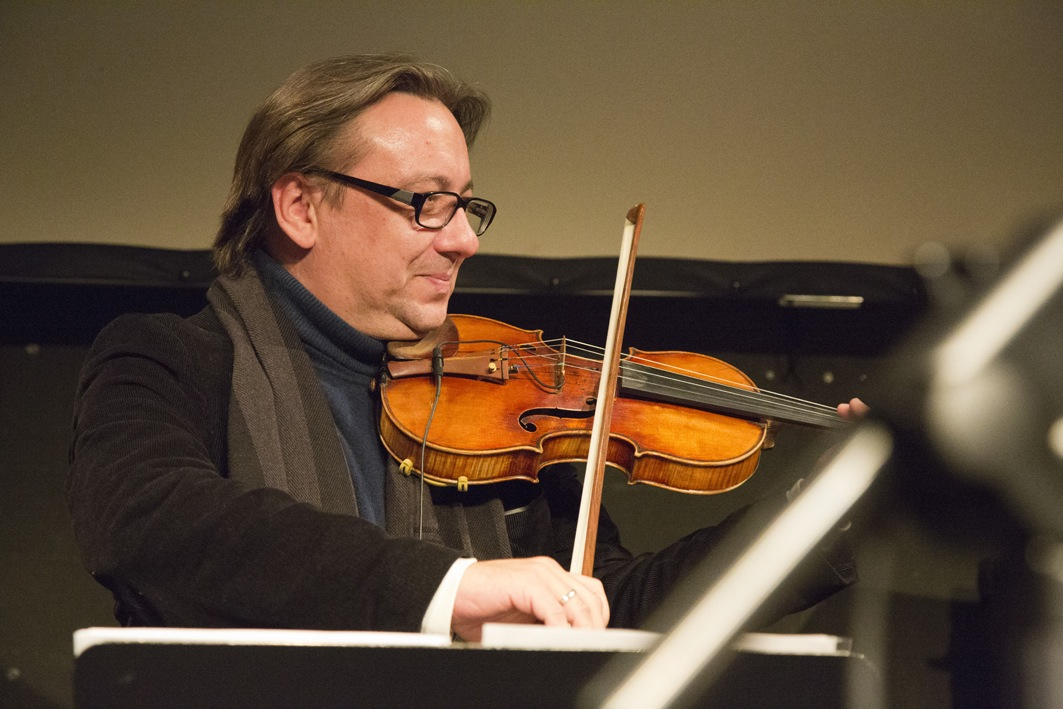
Adam Taubitz at Moods (Zürich 2013)

- Mythen (Daniel Schnyder) (Koch/Schwann, 1991)
- Tarantula (Daniel Schnyder) (Enja, 1992–1996)
- Alive in Montreux (Stephan Kurmann Strings) (TCB, 1996)
- Okan Laye (Stephan Kurmann Strings) (TCB, 1998)
- Lange Nacht des Jazz (The Berlin Philharmonic Jazz Group/Helmut Brandt (Musiker)|Helmut Brandt's Mainstream Orchestra) – IPPNW-Concerts (2001)
- Die Kraft Der Emotionen (Dagmar Herzog/Berlin International Orchestra) (DMH GmbH, 2001)
- Jazzkonzert in der Philharmonie Berlin, (The Berlin Philharmonic Jazz Group & Thomas Quasthoff) – IPPNW-Concerts (2002)
- Milster (Angelika Milster & The Berlin International Orchestra) (EMI Electrola GmbH, 2002)
- Esperanza (Her Majesty's Sound) – Sonic Content (EMI, 2004)
- Daniel Schnyder (*1961) (MGB, 2011)
- "Entre Ciel Et Terre" ("Belleville", Heiner Althaus, Matthias Baldinger und Florenz Hunziker) (2013)
- World of Strings - "Pyhä" (MGB/Musiques Swisses, 2014)
- Compulsion "Dahaana" (Unit, 2015)

== Classical music ==
- Peter Escher: Ein Portrait des Komponisten (Aura Quartett) – Ars musica (1996)
- Edward Elgar: Klavierquintett op.84 und Streichquartett op.83 (Aura Quartett) – Koch Discover (1997)

=== Film music ===
- 1996: Beyond Silence – Regie: Caroline Link
- 2013: Das Kleine Gespenst - Regie: Alain Gsponer
- 2014: Labyrinth of Lies – Regie: Giulio Ricciarelli
- 2015: Heidi – Regie: Alain Gsponer
