= Jimmy Wade =

American jazz musician

James Frederick "Jimmy" Wade (March 13, 1897 – October 12, 1933) was an American jazz trumpeter and bandleader.

Wade began leading groups in the Chicago area about 1916. He played in California and Seattle, Washington with Lucille Hegamin, and then moved with her to New York City, where they played together until 1922. When he returned to Chicago, he played with Doc Cooke, and then put together another group of his own, Jimmy Wade's Syncopators. Eddie South played in this ensemble from 1924 to 1927; other noted sidemen were Punch Miller and Alex Hill, both of whom recorded with him in 1928 as Jimmy Wade and his Dixielanders, and Darnell Howard.

Wade spent most of his career as a bandleader, though reissues of his material are usually done under the names of his more famous sidemen.

Only 7 sides were issued under his name:

- December, 1923, Chicago

1620-1-2 Someday Sweet Heart (Paramount 20295, Harmograph 893, Puritan 11295 -1621-1-2 Mobile Blues (Paramount 20295, Harmograph 893, Puritan 11295) |-

- February, 1924, Chicago

1686-1 You've Got Ways I'm Crazy About (Paramount 20301, Embassy 11363, Mitchell 11363, Puritan 11363) |-

- April 5, 1927, New York

GEX-571 All That I Had Is Gone (Gennett 6105, Black Patti 8019, Champion 15266) -GEX-572 Original Black Bottom Dance (Gennett 6105, Black Patti 8019, Champion 15263) |-(both vocals by Perry Bradford, both Champion's issued as by Harvey Hoffman & His Orchestra)

- October 10, 1928, Chicago

C-2428-A Mississippi Wobble (Vocalion 1236) -C-2429-A Gates Blues (Vocalion 1236, Brunswick 80004) |-(vocal on "Gates Blues" by Punch Miller; the Brunswick issue is from the 1940s)
