= Plantation Days =

1920s musical revue

Plantation Days (1922) was a touring musical revue with Sam Wooding and James P. Johnson as musical directors at different stages of the tour. Produced by Morris "Maury" Greenwald, the touring show was conceived to capitalize on Plantation Revue (1922–23), the successful show staged by Lew Leslie.

Beginning its inaugural run either in Chicago with Johnson as a principal performer, accompanied by Marjorie Sipp and The Plantation Four, among many others or in New York, it was staged by Leonard Harper (who also performed in the revue with his wife, Osceola Blanks), and featured acts by Eddie Green, The Crackerjacks, and The Three Eddies, among others.

At the end of its first US tour, the show was scheduled for a week February 1923 at New York's Lafayette Theatre. However, a court order forced the show to drop three of its most popular numbers, by Noble Sissle and Eubie Blake, which had been pirated from their successful Shuffle Along (1921). The show, minus the three numbers, eventually opened at the Lafayette just over a month later, with Sam Wooding's orchestra.

Following its run at the Lafayette, the show moved to London, where it was initially integrated, as a 12-minute segment, into Gershwin's The Rainbow, which opened at the Empire Theatre in April 1923, brought over by the British promoter Albert de Courville.

Although Ethel Waters had originally been approached by Greenwald for the London run, she actually joined the company in Chicago in August 1923, as an "extra added attraction" to "save the fast-flopping revue".

Revived in 1925, it was during its run at the Royal Theatre, Baltimore, in 1927, with Blanche Calloway as one of the main acts, that Cab Calloway, with his sister's help, joined the revue "as a replacement for the first tenor in a vocal quartet", and decided to devote himself to show business.
