= Eddie Lang =

American jazz guitarist (1902–1933)

- Lang, late 1920s

Background information
- Also known as: Blind Willie Dunn
- Born: Salvatore Massaro; October 25, 1902; Philadelphia, Pennsylvania, U.S.
- Died: March 26, 1933 (aged 30) New York City, U.S.
- Genres: Jazz, swing, chamber jazz
- Occupation: Musician
- Instrument: Guitar
- Years active: 1918–1933
- Labels: Columbia, Brunswick, Okeh
- Formerly of: The Paul Whiteman Orchestra

Eddie Lang (born Salvatore Massaro; October 25, 1902 – March 26, 1933) was an American musician who is credited as the father of jazz guitar. During the 1920s, he gave the guitar a prominence it previously lacked as a solo instrument, as part of a band or orchestra, and as accompaniment for vocalists. He recorded duets with guitarists Lonnie Johnson and Carl Kress and jazz violinist Joe Venuti, and played rhythm guitar in the Paul Whiteman Orchestra and was the favoured accompanist of Bing Crosby.

== Biography ==
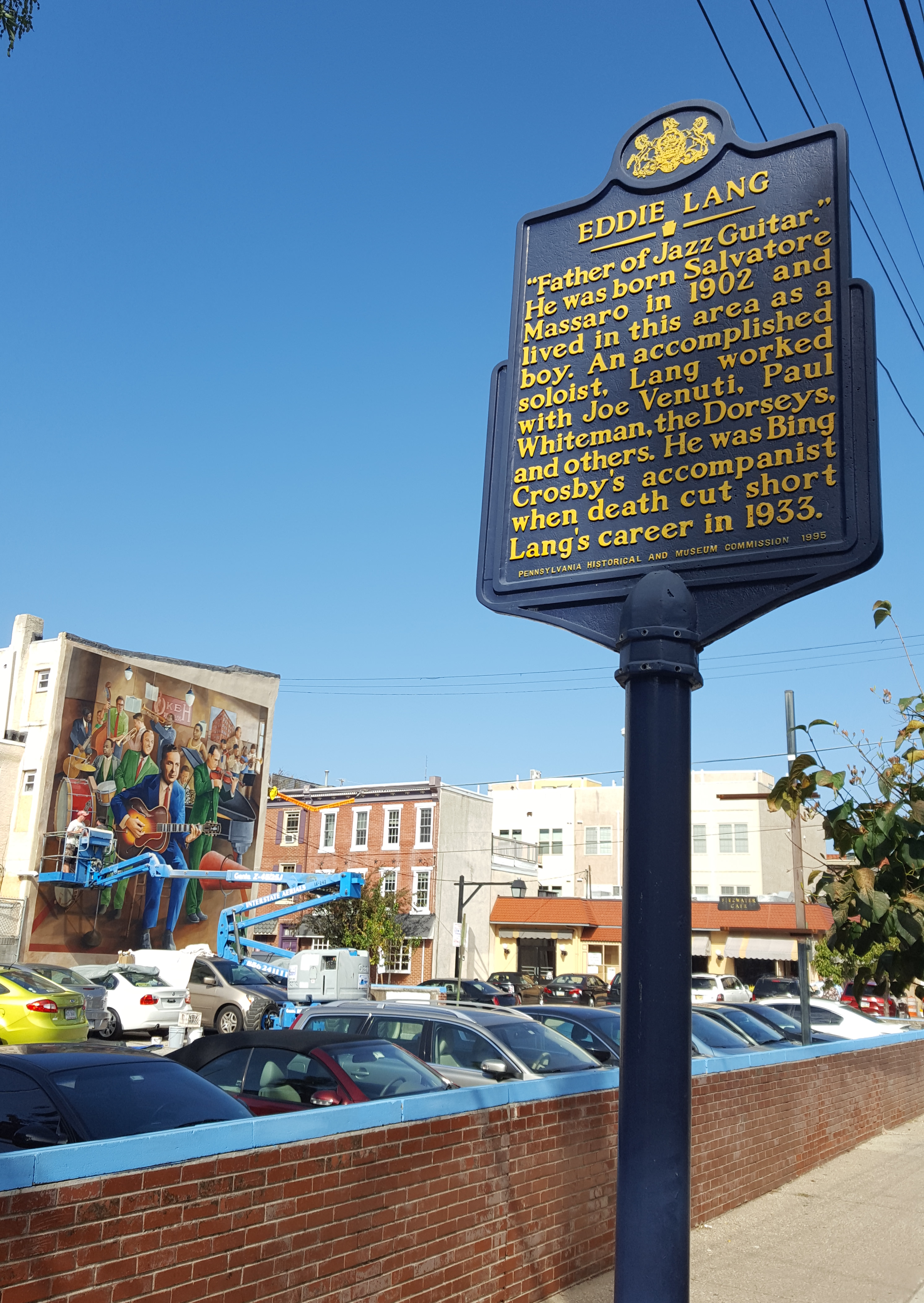
Eddie Lang Pennsylvania Historical Marker and mural by Jared Bader at 7th and Fitzwater Streets in South Philadelphia (October 19, 2016)

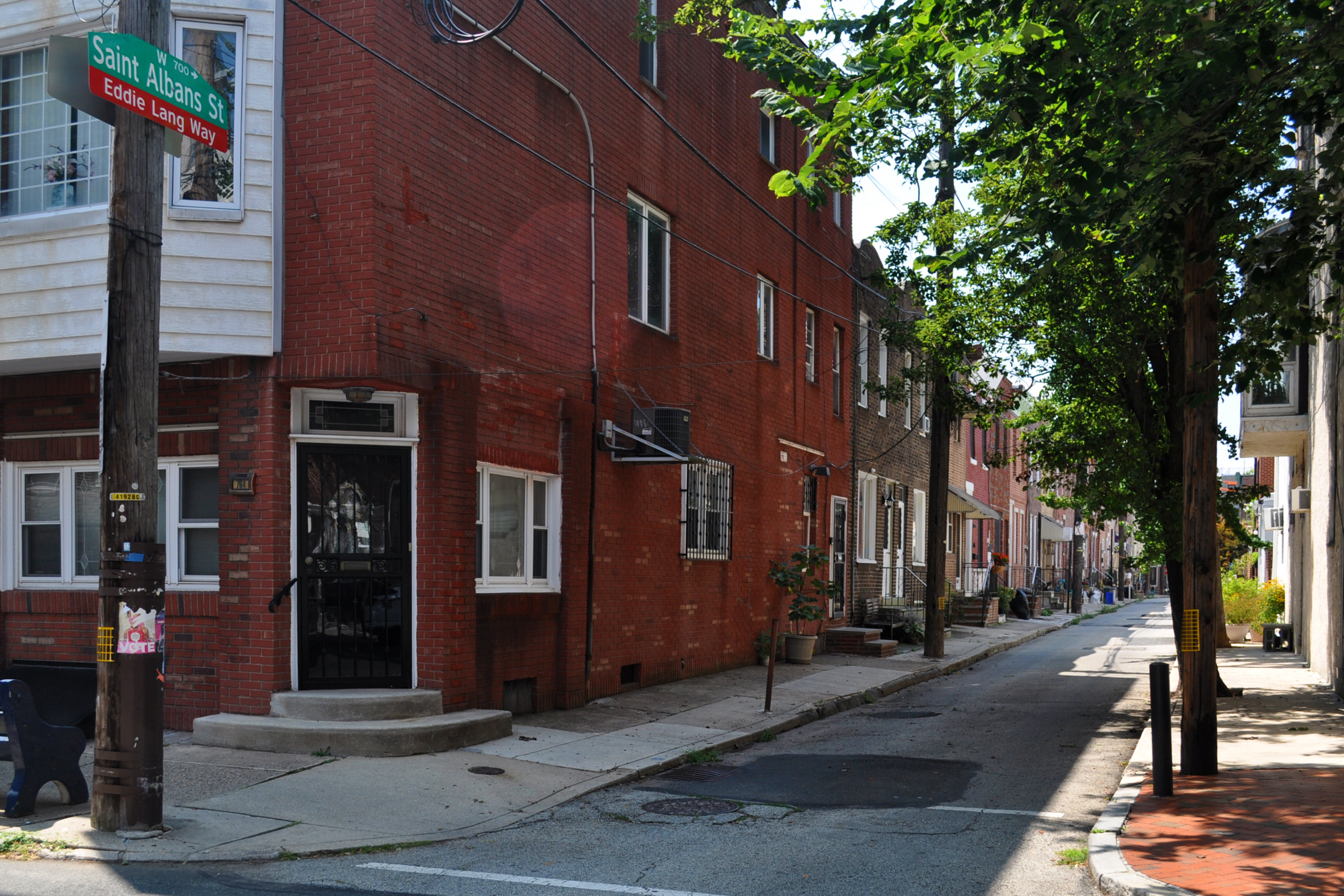
Eddie Lang Way - 700 Block Saint Albans St Philadelphia PA

The son of an Italian American instrument maker, Lang was born in Philadelphia, Pennsylvania, and grew up as friends with violinist Joe Venuti. He started playing the violin, his first instrument, when he was seven. He performed on violin in 1917 and became a member of a trio. In 1920, he dropped the violin for banjo and worked with Charlie Kerr, then Bert Estlow, Vic D'Ippolito, and Billy Lustig's Scranton Siren Orchestra. A few years later, he traded the banjo for guitar when he became a member of Red McKenzie's Mound City Blue Blowers. In 1924, he recorded one of the first guitar solos on "Deep 2nd Street Blues". His performances with McKenzie's band drew attention, and he found many jobs as a freelance guitarist. Before him, the guitar hadn't been a prominent instrument in jazz bands and dance orchestras, playing primarily a rhythm part.

Lang and Joe Venuti recorded with Roger Wolfe Kahn and Jean Goldkette and performed with the Adrian Rollini Orchestra. Lang recorded with blues guitarist Lonnie Johnson under the name Blind Willie Dunn to hide his race and as a tribute to blues guitarist Blind Lemon Jefferson. He also worked with Frankie Trumbauer, Hoagy Carmichael, Annette Hanshaw, Red Nichols, Jack Pettis, Bessie Smith, and Clarence Williams.

=== Friendship with Bing Crosby ===
In 1929, Lang and Venuti became members of the Paul Whiteman Orchestra, and again Lang made an impact. Whiteman was impressed by his ability to learn songs quickly, though Lang had little education and could not read music. During the same year, vocalist Bing Crosby made his first solo recordings. His guitarist was Snoozer Quinn, but for the second session he invited Lang. Their friendship grew when Crosby joined the Whiteman Orchestra on its trip west to Hollywood to make the movie King of Jazz in which Lang and Venuti appeared. In 1930, when Crosby was looking for a job in radio, he insisted on having Lang as his accompaniment. Aside from his friendship with Crosby, he had experience accompanying vocalists, such as Rube Bloom and Ruth Etting. When Crosby toured soon after, Lang sat on a stool next to him to share the microphone. Lang's wife Kitty, a Ziegfeld girl, was friends with Crosby's wife, Dixie. He became a regular in Crosby's orchestra in 1932, the same year he appeared in the movie The Big Broadcast (1932).

== Death ==
Lang suffered from occasional laryngitis, chronic sore throat, and digestion problems. After a doctor recommended a tonsillectomy, Crosby urged Lang to have the operation. Assured that the operation was routine, Lang entered Park West Hospital in Manhattan, but he never awoke from the surgery. He died at the age of thirty in 1933. The cause of his death is uncertain. Lang is buried at Holy Cross Cemetery in Yeadon, Pennsylvania.

== Influence ==
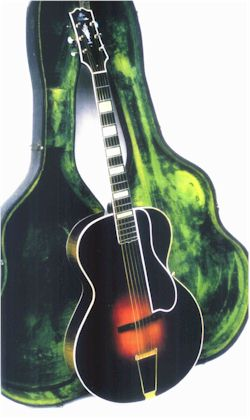
Gibson L5 owned by Lang

Lang, along with New Orleans born Lonnie Johnson, was among the first single-string guitar soloists. He played the melody on one string while adding occasional chords. He demonstrated that the guitar could be a solo instrument in addition to being an accompaniment.

While most bands of the time had a banjo player, Lang was skilled enough to make his acoustic guitar heard against the other instruments by using heavy gauge strings and a high action. He was so influential that, according to George Van Eps, banjo players had no choice but to switch to guitar.

George Harrison once cited Lang as one of his favourite guitarists.

Lang played Gibson L-4 and L-5 guitars.

== Honors ==
In 1977, Lang's recording of "Singin' the Blues" with Frankie Trumbauer and Bix Beiderbecke, was inducted into the Grammy Hall of Fame and in 2006 was placed on the U.S. Library of Congress National Recording Registry. He was inducted into the ASCAP Jazz Wall of Fame (1986) and the Big Band and Jazz Hall of Fame (2010).

On October 23, 2016, Philadelphia's Mural Arts organization dedicated the mural Eddie Lang: The Father of Jazz Guitar, by artist Jared Bader. The mural stands by Lang's childhood home and the James Campbell School that stood at 8th and Fitzwater where Lang learned to play. The mural was championed by area guitarist Richard Barnes, who started "Eddie Lang Day in Philadelphia" in 2010, an annual charity event.

== Compositions ==
Lang's compositions, based on the Red Hot Jazz database, include "Wild Cat" with Joe Venuti, "Perfect" with Frank Signorelli, "April Kisses", "Sunshine", "Melody Man's Dream", "Goin' Places", "Black and Blue Bottom", "Bull Frog Moan", "Rainbow Dreams", "Feelin' My Way", "Eddie's Twister", "Really Blue", "Penn Beach Blues", "Wild Dog", "Pretty Trix", "A Mug of Ale", "Apple Blossoms", "Beating the Dog", "To To Blues", "Running Ragged", "Kicking the Cat", "Cheese and Crackers", "Doin' Things", "Blue Guitars", "Guitar Blues" with Lonnie Johnson, "Hot Fingers", "Have to Change Keys to Play These Blues", "A Handful of Riffs", "Blue Room", "Deep Minor Rhythm Stomp", "Two-Tone Stomp". "Midnight Call Blues", "Four String Joe", "Goin' Home", and "Pickin' My Way" with Carl Kress.

== Discography ==
=== Albums ===
- Stringing the Blues with Joe Venuti (CBS, 1962)
- Jazz Guitar Virtuoso (Yazoo, 1977)
- A Handful of Riffs (ASV/Living Era, 1989)
- Pioneers of Jazz Guitar 1927–1938 (Yazoo, 1992)
- Blue Guitars, Vols. 1 & 2 with Lonnie Johnson (BGO, 1997)
- The Quintessential Eddie Lang (Timeless, 1998)
- The New York Sessions 1926–1935 with Joe Venuti (JSP, 2003)
- The Classic Columbia and Okeh Joe Venuti and Eddie Lang (Mosaic, 2002)
- 1927–1932 (Chronological Classics, 2004)

=== Singles ===
Song	Musicians	Recording date	Label
Stringin' the Blues	Joe Venuti	November 8, 1926	
Hurricane	Red Nichols and His Five Pennies	January 12, 1927	
Wild Cat	Joe Venuti	January 24, 1927	Okeh
Sunshine	Joe Venuti	January 24, 1927	Okeh
Singin' the Blues	Bix Beiderbecke, Frankie Trumbauer	February 4, 1927	Okeh
April Kisses b/w Eddie's Twister		April 1, 1927	Okeh
Doin' Things	Joe Venuti	May 4, 1927	
Goin' Places	Joe Venuti	May 4, 1927	
For No Reason at All in C	Bix Beiderbecke, Frankie Trumbauer	May 13, 1927	Okeh, Columbia, Parlophone
Beating the Dog	Joe Venuti, Adrian Rollini	June 28, 1927	Okeh
Wringin' an' Twistin'	Bix Beiderbecke, Frankie Trumbauer	September 17, 1927	OKeh
Perfect	Frank Signorelli	October 21, 1927	Okeh
Four String Joe	Joe Venuti's Blue Four	November 15, 1927	
Guitar Blues	Lonnie Johnson	May 7, 1929	Okeh
Knockin' a Jug	Louis Armstrong, Jack Teagarden	March 5, 1929	
Kitchen Man	Bessie Smith	May 8, 1929	
A Bench in the Park	Paul Whiteman and His Orchestra	March 21, 1930	
Georgia on My Mind	Hoagy Carmichael, Bix Beiderbecke	September 15, 1930	Victor
Pickin' My Way	Carl Kress	January 15, 1932	Brunswick
Feelin' My Way	Carl Kress	January 17, 1932	Brunswick
Please	Bing Crosby	September 16, 1932	
Jigsaw Puzzle Blues	Joe Venuti, Eddie Lang's Blue Five	February 28, 1933	

== Bibliography ==
- Berend, Dave. Seven Original Compositions for the Guitar by the Great Eddie Lang: Transcribed and Arranged for Plectrum Guitar Solos with Guitar Accompaniment. Robbins Music, 1961.
- Mazzoletti, Adriano. Eddie Lang: Stringin' the Blues. Rome, Italy: Pantheon Editore, 1997.
- Peters, Mike. The Classic Columbia and Okeh Joe Venuti and Eddie Lang Sessions. Notes by Mike Peters, Marty Grosz, Richard M. Sudhalter, Scott Wenzel. Mosaic Records, 2002.
- Sallis, James, editor. Jazz Guitar: An Anthology. Quill Publishers, 1984.
- Worsfold, Sally-Ann. The Quintessential Eddie Lang, 1925–1932. Timeless Records, 1997.
