= Stardust Memories =

1980 film by Woody Allen

- Theatrical release poster
- Directed by: Woody Allen
- Written by: Woody Allen
- Produced by: Robert Greenhut
- Starring: Woody Allen; Charlotte Rampling; Jessica Harper; Marie-Christine Barrault; Tony Roberts
- Cinematography: Gordon Willis
- Edited by: Susan E. Morse
- Production company: Jack Rollins–Charles H. Joffe Productions
- Distributed by: United Artists
- Release date: September 26, 1980
- Running time: 88 minutes
- Country: United States
- Language: English
- Budget: $10 million
- Box office: $10.4 million (US and Canada)

Stardust Memories is a 1980 American comedy-drama film written and directed by Woody Allen, who stars alongside Charlotte Rampling, Jessica Harper, Marie-Christine Barrault, and Tony Roberts. Sharon Stone has a brief role, in her film debut. It follows a filmmaker who recalls his life and his loves—the inspirations for his films—while attending a retrospective of his work. The film is shot in black and white and is reminiscent of Federico Fellini's 8½ (1963), which it parodies.

Stardust Memories was nominated for a Writers Guild of America Award for Best Comedy Written Directly for the Screenplay, but was not warmly received by critics on its original release, and is not among the most renowned works in Allen's filmography. The film has nonetheless been re-evaluated to some extent, with modern reception more often positive than negative. Allen, who denies that the work is autobiographical and has expressed regret that audiences interpreted it as such, has cited Stardust Memories as one of his own favorite films.

== Plot ==
Sandy Bates is a director of comedy films. His latest film ends with a surreal sequence in which a character (played by Sandy) is trapped on a train carriage surrounded by grotesque and unhappy figures. The character looks out the carriage window and sees another train filled with beautiful and happy people. Convinced he is on the wrong train, he tries to get off the train before it speeds away. In the next scene, all the characters from the train wander aimlessly through an immense garbage dump. Sandy's character sees that the passengers from the other train have also ended up at the dump. Studio executives, having watched Sandy's film, complain that it is uncommercial and depressing. When this is conveyed to Sandy, he insists that he no longer wants to make shallow comedy films, as this no longer feels honest to him.

Sandy's managers remind him that he is scheduled to appear at a weekend-long retrospective of his films at the Stardust Hotel on the Jersey Shore. He is reluctant but agrees to attend. Through the weekend, Sandy is haunted by memories of Dorrie, a former lover with troubled mental health. He recalls his first meeting with Dorrie on the set of one of his films, the blossoming of their relationship, and its later deterioration through a combination of her insecurities and his philandering. His last meeting with Dorrie takes place in a psychiatric hospital, where she is depressed and medicated.

Arriving at the Stardust Hotel, Sandy is swamped by fans, who often make bizarre or comical requests from him. He attends screenings of his films, and then submits to question and answer sessions. After the first session, he is invited to a nearby club by a young couple, Jack and Daisy, and he eagerly agrees. At the nightclub, Sandy uses an instance of Jack's absence to openly flirt with Daisy.

The following day, Sandy's current lover Isobel, a married mother of two, arrives at the hotel to join him. She announces that she has left her husband. Sandy responds ambivalently to this news, but considers taking their relationship to the next level. Sandy also meets with executives from his film studio, who have reshot the ending of his film, with the characters ending up in "jazz heaven", instead of the garbage dump. Sandy declares the idea to be idiotic, and refuses to accept it.

While talking with his agent on a public phone, Sandy overhears Daisy talking about her sexual ambivalence towards Jack. Later, Sandy organizes an outing alone with Daisy. While the two are together, Sandy's car breaks down and they are forced to continue on foot. They arrive at a large field, where they encounter a congregation of locals awaiting the appearance of flying saucers. During this encounter, Sandy begins losing touch with reality, imagining or hallucinating various figures from his life and films, as well as a group of extraterrestrials (who advise him to continue making comedies). He finally imagines a psychotic fan who shoots him dead.

Actually having fainted in a panic attack, Sandy fantasizes that he is given a posthumous award for his life's work. He accepts the award in person, and tells the audience that the one moment in his life where he felt truly happy and fulfilled was on a sunny morning in his Manhattan apartment, passing the time with Dorrie, reading and listening to Louis Armstrong's version of "Stardust". As Sandy awakes from his fainting spell, he speaks Dorrie's name, which angers Isobel, who has been waiting by his bedside. She attempts to break up with him, prompting him to abandon the retrospective and follow her onto her train. He passionately persuades her to forgive him, and they kiss as the train departs.

These events are observed by a film audience, which includes many figures who appear as characters in the film. As this film ends, they discuss its merits and flaws, and share their experiences of making it. As the audience departs the theater, a figure resembling Sandy enters, retrieves his iconic sunglasses from a seat, and then exits.

== Cast ==
- Woody Allen as Sandy Bates
- Charlotte Rampling as Dorrie
- Jessica Harper as Daisy
- Marie-Christine Barrault as Isobel
- Tony Roberts as Tony
- Daniel Stern as Actor
- Amy Wright as Shelley
- Helen Hanft as Vivian Orkin
- John Rothman as Jack Abel
- Anne De Salvo as Sandy's Sister
- Leonardo Cimino as Sandy's Analyst
- Sharon Stone as Pretty Girl On Train (Note: Of the train window through which she blows a kiss during the opening sequence, Stone remarked, "I gave it my best shot to melt the sucker.")
- Jack Rollins as Studio Executive
- Judith Roberts as Singer ("Three Little Words")
- Candy Loving as Tony's Girlfriend
- Brent Spiner as Fan In Lobby
- Judith Crist as Cabaret Patron
- Irwin Keyes and Bonnie Hellman as Fans Outside Hotel
- Cynthia Gibb (credited as Cindy Gibb) as Young Girl Fan
- Annie Korzen (credited as Anne Korzen) as Woman In Ice Cream Parlor
- James Otis and Largo Woodruff as UFO Followers
- Alice Spivak as Nurse At Hospital
- Armin Shimerman as Member of The Eulogy Audience
- The Jazz Heaven Orchestra, which includes Joe Wilder, Richie Pratt, Hank Jones, Arvell Shaw, and Earl Shendell
- Laraine Newman as Film Executive (uncredited)
- Louise Lasser as Sandy's Secretary (uncredited)
- William Zinsser as Catholic Priest (uncredited) (Note: Zinsser had been an early interviewer of Woody Allen in 1963, for The Saturday Evening Post; after a chance re-encounter in 1980, Allen cast him in this role; Zinsser has remarked, in that context, that Protestants abound among his ancestors.)

== Themes ==
Allen has asserted that Stardust Memories is not an autobiographical work. "[Critics] thought that the lead character was me!", the director is quoted as saying in Woody Allen on Woody Allen. "Not a fictional character, but me, and that I was expressing hostility toward my audience. ... [T]hat was in no way the point of the film. It was about a character who is obviously having a sort of nervous breakdown and in spite of success has come to a point in his life where he is having a bad time."

The conflict between the maternal, nurturing woman and the earnest, usually younger one, is a recurring theme in Allen's films. Like many of Allen's films, Stardust Memories incorporates several jazz recordings including those by such notables as Louis Armstrong, Django Reinhardt, and Chick Webb. The film's title alludes to the famous take of "Stardust" recorded in 1931 by Armstrong, wherein the trumpeter sings "oh, memory" three times in succession. However, it is the master take that plays in the movie during the sequence where Sandy is remembering the best moment of his life: looking at Dorrie while listening to Armstrong's recording of the song.

The film deals with issues regarding religion, God, and philosophy; especially existentialism, psychology, symbolism, wars and politics. It is also about realism, relationships, and death. It refers to many questions about the meaning of life. It also ruminates on the role that luck plays in life, a theme Allen would revisit in Match Point.

== Production ==
Filming locations include:

- Asbury Park, New Jersey
- Bradley Beach, New Jersey
- Ocean Grove, New Jersey

From the sleeve notes of MGM's 2000 DVD release: "Shot on location in the fall of 1979, Stardust Memories may look as though it takes place in a Victorian-style seaside hotel, but it was actually shot at the Ocean Grove Great Auditorium and the Methodist Episcopal Conference Center and Concert Hall in New Jersey. Most of the interiors, including the bedroom scenes, were shot in a vacant Sears Roebuck building, but the crew also recreated a vintage train at Filmways Studio in Harlem. To reproduce the movement of a rail car, the whole train was mounted on jacks and gently jostled back and forth."

== Soundtrack ==
- "Tropical Mood Meringue" (Sidney Bechet) by Sidney Bechet
- "I'll See You in My Dreams" (Isham Jones and Gus Kahn) by Django Reinhardt
- "Tickletoe" (Lester Young) by Lester Young with Count Basie and His Orchestra
- "Three Little Words" (Bert Kalmar, Harry Ruby) by the Jazz Heaven Orchestra
- "Brazil" (Ary Barroso, S.K. Russell) by Marie Lane
- "Palesteena" (J. Russel Robinson and Con Conrad) by the Original Dixieland Jazz Band
- "Body and Soul" (Edward Heyman, Robert Sour, John W. Green, and Frank Eyton) by Django Reinhardt
- "Night on Bald Mountain" (Modest Mussorgsky) by Vienna State Opera Orchestra
- "If Dreams Come True" (Irving Mills, Edgar M. Sampson, and Benny Goodman) by Chick Webb
- "Hebrew School Rag" (Dick Hyman) by Dick Hyman
- "Just One of Those Things" (Cole Porter) by Dick Hyman
- "Easy to Love" (Cole Porter) by Dick Hyman
- "One O'Clock Jump" (Count Basie) by the Jazz Heaven Orchestra
- "Sugar" (Maceo Pinkard and Sidney D. Mitchell)
- "Sweet Georgia Brown" (Ben Bernie, Kenneth Casey and Maceo Pinkard)
- "Moonlight Serenade" (Glenn Miller) by Glenn Miller
- "Stardust" (Hoagy Carmichael, Mitchell Parish) by Louis Armstrong

== Reception ==
=== Box office ===
Stardust Memories opened in North America on September 26, 1980. On its opening weekend, the film grossed $326,779 from 29 theaters, averaging $11,268 per screen. It grossed $10,389,003 in the United States and Canada by the end of its run, against a production budget of $10 million.

=== Critical response ===
In Diane Jacobs' But We Need the Eggs: The Magic of Woody Allen, the director is quoted as saying: "[S]hortly after Stardust Memories opened, John Lennon was shot by the very guy who had asked him for his autograph earlier in the day. ... This is what happens with celebrities—one day people love you, the next day they want to kill you."

On the review aggregator website Rotten Tomatoes, the film holds an approval rating of 66% based on 32 reviews, with an average rating of 6.6/10. The website's critics consensus reads, "Woody Allen throws himself a pity party with all the surrealistic trimmings of Federico Fellini in Stardust Memories, a scabrous self-portrait that rankles as often as it impresses stylisticly." Janet Maslin of The New York Times wrote the work "is [Allen's] most provocative film thus far and perhaps his most revealing" and certainly "the one that will inspire the most heated debate". Roger Ebert of the Chicago Sun-Times gave the film two stars out of four and called it "a disappointment. It needs some larger idea, some sort of organizing force, to pull together all these scenes of bitching and moaning, and make them lead somewhere." Gene Siskel of the Chicago Tribune gave the film two-and-a-half stars out of four and suggested that Allen "seems to have run out of creative gas. The film doesn't have much of a premise." Gary Arnold of The Washington Post wrote that the film "has no dramatic shape or resonance, and the incidental laughs are few and far between." Charles Champlin of the Los Angeles Times was positive, calling the film "both extremely funny and extremely affecting ... Allen's growth as an actor and as a filmmaker in confident command of his medium is one of the several remarkable readouts from this film." Pauline Kael of The New Yorker wrote, "In Stardust Memories we get more of the same thoughts over and over—it's like watching a loop. The material is fractured and the scenes are very short, but there was not a single one that I was sorry to see end. Stardust Memories doesn't seem like a movie, or even like a filmed essay; it's nothing."

In a joint article, The Daily Telegraph film critics Robbie Collin and Tim Robey listed it as Allen's 10th greatest film and wrote; "slammed at the time, it's a retrospective knock-out, thanks to its ambitious structure, vinegary gags and the searing monochrome photography, courtesy of Gordon Willis". Sam Fragoso of IndieWire also ranked it among Allen's best works, lauding it as "an extraordinarily realized portrait of artistic stagnation". The film was listed 16th among Allen's efforts in a poll of Time Out contributors, with editor Joshua Rothkopf praising it as "a piece of self-referential hilarity in its own right."

In October 2013, Stardust Memories was voted by The Guardian readers as the eighth best film directed by Allen.

== See also ==
- List of cult films
