= For No Reason at All in C =

1927 jazz instrumental

1927 78 single release on Okeh, 40871.

"For No Reason at All in C" is a 1927 jazz instrumental by Bix Beiderbecke, Frankie Trumbauer, and Eddie Lang. It was released as a 78 rpm single in 1927 on OKeh Records as by "Tram, Bix and Eddie (In Their Three Piece Band)".

== Background ==
Bix Beiderbecke plays piano and cornet, Frankie Trumbauer plays a C melody saxophone, and Eddie Lang is on acoustic guitar. The piece was composed by Beiderbecke and Trumbauer and recorded in New York on May 13, 1927. Bix Beiderbecke and Frankie Trumbauer had earlier worked together as members of the Jean Goldkette Orchestra. The recording was originally released as a 78 rpm single on OKeh 40871 (matrix 81085), and subsequently on Columbia 35667, and in the UK on Parlophone R3419. The flip side of the OKeh single was "Trumbology".

The work is sometimes erroneously credited to George W. Meyer, Sam M. Lewis, and Joe Young. They composed a song entitled "For No Reason At All" in 1921. The Bix Beiderbecke/Frankie Trumbauer piece is a different work.

== Reception and influence ==
In "The Birth of the Cool 1927", Len Weinstock showed that Bix Beiderbecke's collaborations with Frankie Trumbauer resulted in the emergence of "cool jazz":

Who was the father of Cool Jazz? Miles Davis? Lester Young? Stan Getz? Gerry Mulligan? The answer, is none of the above. Cool Jazz has its roots as early as 1927 in the wonderful collaborations of cornetist Bix Beiderbecke and C-melody saxman Frank (Tram) Trumbauer! Bix and Tram were closely associated as early as 1925 and developed a tight musical rapport. They both used a linear, relaxed and lyrical style and were the first to offer an alternative to the searing, passionate and extroverted music that characterized the Jazz Age. ...

This really constituted the birth of Cool Jazz. The most important recordings of these groups include Singin' the Blues, Way Down Yonder in New Orleans, I'm Coming Virginia, For No Reason At All in C, Wringin' and Twistin' and Bix's legendary piano solo In a Mist. Somewhat hotter but still very much laid back were Clarinet Marmalade, Ostrich Walk, and Riverboat Shuffle.

These works were not simply recorded and then forgotten, to be rediscovered as an oddity at some later date. These records caused an immediate sensation in the Jazz community and sent a shockwave through Jazz history that can still be felt today.

The composition has also been analyzed as one of the first uses in jazz of contrafact techniques, using the chord progressions of another song to create a new song, which became popular in Be-Bop. The song uses chord progressions of the 1926 song "I'd Climb the Highest Mountain (If I Knew I'd Find You)" written by Lew Brown and Sidney Clare.

== Notable recordings ==
Marty Grosz and His Honoras Causa Jazz Band recorded it on the album Hooray for Bix!. Scott Robinson recorded "For No Reason at All in C" on his 2000 album Melody from the Sky. The Bix Beiderbecke Fabulous band performed it at the 2003 Bix 100 Project in the Netherlands in the Jazz Club Delft in March, 2003. The project was initiated and directed by multi-instrumentalist Ad Houtepen. The instrumental was also recorded by composer Julio Remersaro (piano & cornet) during a performance at the AMIA Auditorium on August 4, 2013 in Buenos Aires, Argentina. The piece was also performed in concert in 2003 by a band that included Mark Shane on piano, Howard Alden on guitar, and Dan Levinson, Jerry Dodgion, and Scott Robinson on C-melody saxophone at the JVC Jazz Festival at the Hunter College Danny Kaye Playhouse in an arrangement by Dan Levinson during the Bix Beiderbecke centennial. Hal Smith's Swing Central released a version of the piece in 2017 on the album Windy City Swing.
