= Hooray for Bix! =

Album by Marty Grosz

Studio album by Marty Grosz and his Honoris Causa Jazz Band
- Released: 1958
- Recorded: December 1957; Yellow Springs, Ohio
- Genre: Jazz
- Length: 45:34
- Label: Riverside; RLP 12-268
- Producer: Orrin Keepnews

Marty Grosz chronology
Thanks (1956)	Hooray for Bix! (1958)	Marty Grosz and His Hot Combination (1958)

Hooray for Bix! is an album by American jazz guitarist Marty Grosz and his Honoris Causa Jazz Band featuring compositions associated with cornetist Bix Beiderbecke recorded in 1957 for the Riverside label.

== Reception ==
Professional ratings
Review scores
Source	Rating
Allmusic	4/5 stars

Allmusic reviewer Scott Yanow stated: "Recommended. But why did it take Marty Grosz so long to catch on?".

== Track listing ==
1. "Changes" (Walter Donaldson) - 2:44
2. "Cryin' All Day" (Chauncey Morehouse, Frankie Trumbauer) - 4:19
3. "Lonely Melody" (Sam Coslow, Hal Dyson, Benny Meroff) - 3:16
4. "I'm Gonna Meet My Sweetie Now" (Benny Davis, Jesse Greer) - 4:11
5. "Sorry" (Raymond Klages, Howdy Quicksell) - 3:49
6. "My Pet" (Milton Ager, Jack Yellen) - 3:08
7. "The Love Nest" (Otto Harbach, Louis A. Hirsch, Walter Hirsch) - 3:49
8. "Clementine" - 4:03
9. "Oh, Miss Hannah" (Jessie Deppen, Thekla Hollingsworth) - 4:23
10. "Wa-Da-Da (Everybody's Doin' It Now)" (Harry Barris, James Cavanaugh) - 3:42
11. "For No Reason at All in C" (Bix Beiderbecke, Frankie Trumbauer) - 4:28
12. "Because My Baby Don't Mean 'Maybe' Now" (Donaldson, Frank Teschemacher, Guy d'Hardelot) - 3:38

== Personnel ==
- Marty Grosz – guitar, vocals
- Harry Budd – trombone
- Carl Halen – cornet
- Turk Santos – cornet, guitar
- Bob Skiver – tenor saxophone, clarinet
- Frank Chace – clarinet, baritone saxophone
- Tut Soper – piano
- Chuck Neilson – double bass
- Pepper Boggs – drums
