= Singin' the Blues (Sam M. Lewis, Joe Young, Con Conrad and J. R. Robinson song) =

1920 jazz composition

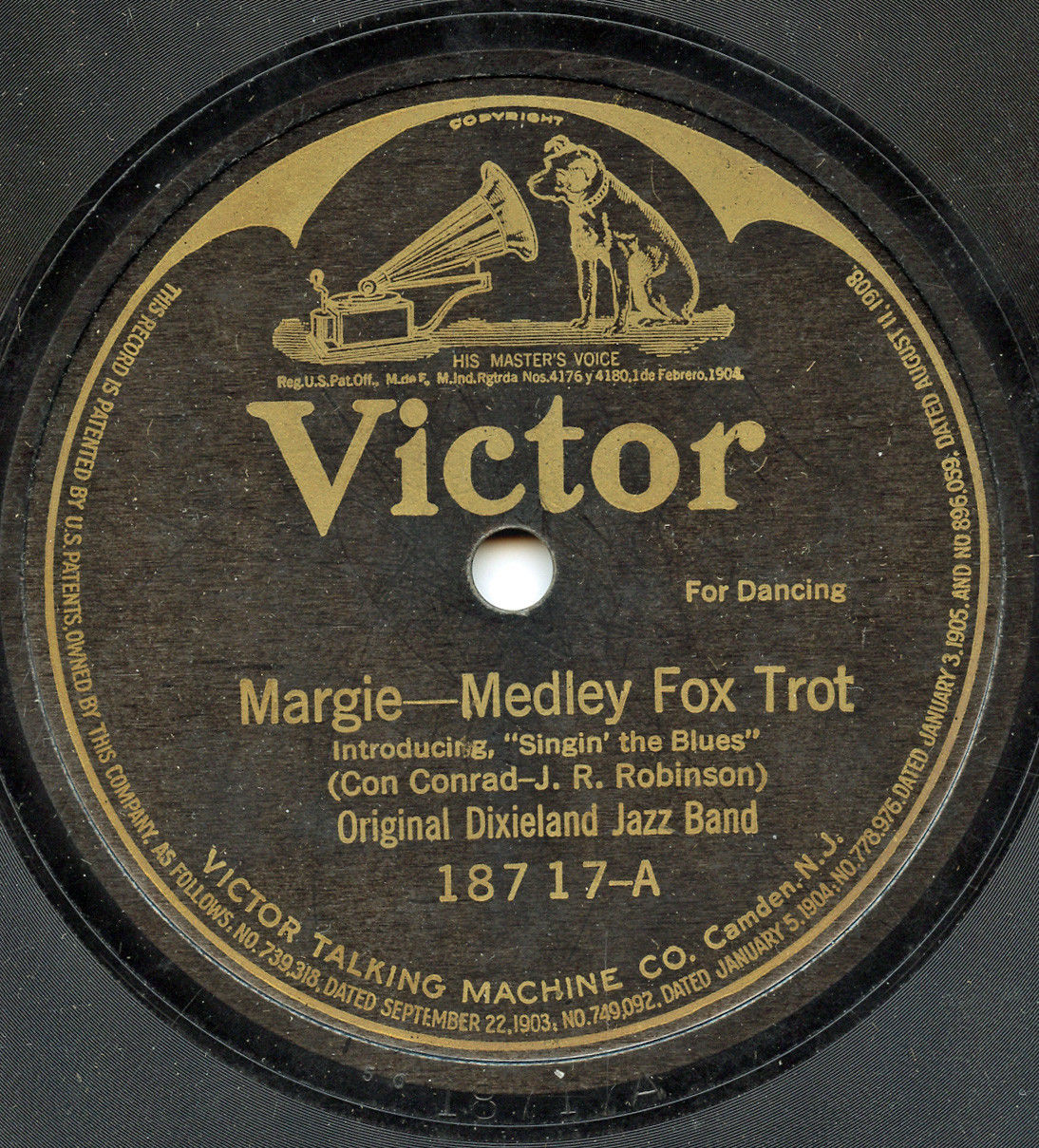
1920 78 release by the ODJB on Victor as 18717A.

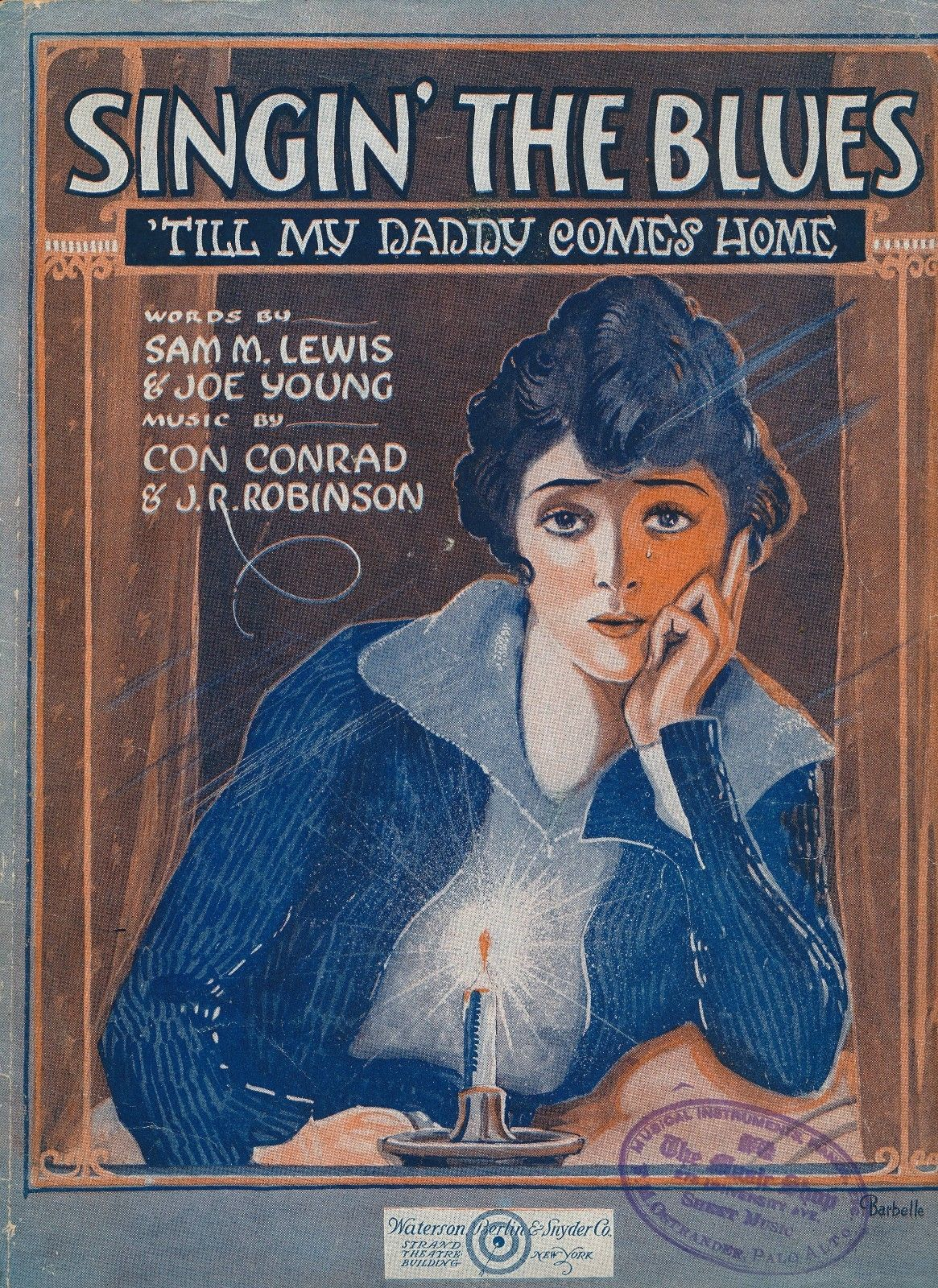
1920 sheet music cover, Waterson, Berlin & Snyder, New York.

1927 Frankie Trumbauer, Bix Beiderbecke, and Eddie Lang version on Okeh, 40772-B.

"Singin' the Blues" is a 1920 jazz composition by J. Russel Robinson, Con Conrad, Sam M. Lewis, and Joe Young. It was recorded by the Original Dixieland Jass Band in 1920 as an instrumental and released as a Victor 78 as part of a medley with "Margie".

The song was released with lyrics by vocalist Aileen Stanley in 1920 on Victor. In 1927, Frank Trumbauer, Bix Beiderbecke, and Eddie Lang recorded and released the song as an Okeh 78. The Trumbauer recording is a jazz and pop standard, greatly contributing to Frank Trumbauer and Bix Beiderbecke's reputation and influence (it remained in print at least until the Second World War). It was one of the first jazz recordings inducted into the Grammy Hall of Fame. It is regarded as one of the greatest jazz recording and performances of the 20th century.

It is not related to the 1956 pop song "Singing the Blues" first recorded and released by Marty Robbins in 1956.

== Background ==
The ODJB released the song as part of a medley: "Margie" (Introducing "Singin' the Blues") in 1920 on Victor as B-24581-5 Victor 18717A backed with Palesteena. The subtitle of the song is "'Till My Daddy Comes Home". The personnel on the recording were Nick LaRocca, trumpet, Larry Shields, clarinet, Benny Krueger, alto sax, Eddie Edwards, trombone, J. Russel Robinson, piano, and Tony Sbarbaro, drums. The recording was made on December 1, 1920. Robinson and Conrad composed the music. Lewis and Young wrote the lyrics. The song was published by Waterson, Berlin & Snyder, Inc., in New York.

== Other Recordings ==
The Aileen Stanley version was released as Victor 18703, Matrix # 24657–6, in 1920. Bennie Krueger and his Orchestra recorded the song in 1921. Fletcher Henderson and His orchestra released the song in 1931. Marion Harris recorded the song for Columbia in 1934. The song was recorded by Lionel Hampton and His orchestra in 1939 by RCA Victor. Eddie Condon and His Band released the song in 1943 on Commodore. Connie Boswell recorded the song on Decca Records in 1952. The Original Memphis Five released their version of "Singin' the Blues" in 1957 with leader James Lytell on clarinet, Billy Butterfield on trumpet, Miff Mole on trombone, and Frank Signorelli on piano, Eugene Traxler on bass, and Tony Sbarbaro on drums (though Billy Butterfield had recorded a version of it with his own band in 1950, which was released by London Records).

The most recent recording is by French trumpeter Malo Mazurié featuring Noé Huchard, Raphael Dever and David Grebi on the album Taking the Plunge, 2024, which also features "Davenport Blues" and "Candlelights" by Box Beiderbecke.

== Trumbauer/Beiderbecke Recording ==
"Singin' the Blues" (1927)
Beiderbecke's solo in "Singin' the Blues"

Bix Beiderbecke, Frank Trumbauer, and Eddie Lang recorded "Singin' the Blues" on February 4, 1927, in New York and released it as Okeh 40772 backed with "Clarinet Marmalade" as by Frankie Trumbauer's Orchestra with Bix and Lang. The personnel on the session were: Frankie Trumbauer, C-melody saxophone; Bix Beiderbecke, cornet; Bill Rank, trombone; Jimmy Dorsey, clarinet; Doc Ryker, alto sax; Paul Madeira Mertz, piano; Eddie Lang, guitar; and, Chauncey Morehouse, drums. This recording became a jazz milestone and a jazz standard which was inducted in the Grammy Hall of Fame in 1977.

== Sources ==
- Stewart, Jack. "The Original Dixieland Jazz Band's Place in the Development of Jazz." New Orleans International Music Colloquium, 2005.
- Lange, Horst H. Wie der Jazz begann: 1916–1923, von der "Original Dixieland Jazz Band" bis zu King Olivers "Creole Jazz Band". Berlin: Colloquium Verlag, 1991. ISBN 3-7678-0779-3
- Brunn, H.O. The Story of the Original Dixieland Jazz Band. Baton Rouge: Louisiana State University Press, 1960. Reprinted by Da Capo Press, 1977. ISBN 0-306-70892-2
