= Victor Recording Orchestra =

American jazz band (1924–1927)

- Genres: Jazz; swing
- Years active: 1924–1927
- Label: Victor
- Past members: Bix Beiderbecke

The Victor Recording Orchestra was an American jazz band led by Jean Goldkette. It was known for its innovative arrangements and strong rhythm.

Among its members were:

- Bix Beiderbecke
- Steve Brown
- Hoagy Carmichael
- Jimmy Dorsey
- Tommy Dorsey
- Eddie Lang
- Don Murray
- Howdy Quicksell
- Pee Wee Russell
- Frankie Trumbauer
- Joe Venuti
- Bill Rank

Among the band's own arrangers was Russ Morgan; the band also traded arrangements with Fletcher Henderson. The band's most popular records included "After I Say I'm Sorry," "Dinah," "Gimme a Little Kiss, Will Ya, Huh?" and "Lonesome and Sorry." According to Rex Stewart, the primitive recording techniques of the day (for example, bass and snare drums could not be recorded) failed to provide a true record of the band.
