= Top Spin =

In sports, topspin is a property of a shot where the ball rotates as if rolling in the same direction as it is moving.

Topspin or Top Spin may also refer to:

- Top Spin (film), a 2014 documentary on Olympic athletes
- Top Spin (ride), an amusement park thrill ride
- Top Spin (video game), a 2003 tennis video game
- Topspin (Transformers), several robot superhero characters in the Transformers robot superhero franchise.
- Topspin (comics), a Marvel Comics mutant
- Topspin Media, a marketing and e-commerce software platform for artists
- Topspin Communications, a computer networking company acquired by Cisco Systems

== See also ==
- Spintop
- Tailspin (disambiguation)
- Topspinner (disambiguation)
