= Swing music =

Style of jazz

Swing
- Stylistic origins: Ragtime; Dixieland jazz; New Orleans jazz; big band; blues
- Cultural origins: 1930s, United States
- Derivative forms: Traditional pop; jump blues; bebop

Subgenres
- Swing revival

Fusion genres
- Electro swing

Regional scenes
- Western swing

Swing music is a style of jazz that developed in the United States during the late 1920s and early 1930s before gaining widespread popularity in the mid-1930s. It represents the most famous era of jazz as a genre of entertainment, before the emergence of modern jazz. Swing bands usually featured soloists who would improvise on the melody over the arrangement. The danceable swing style of big bands and bandleaders such as Fletcher Henderson and Benny Goodman was the dominant form of American popular music from roughly 1935 to 1946, a period known as the swing era, when people were dancing the Lindy Hop. The verb "to swing" is also used as a term of praise for playing that has a strong groove or drive. Big band leaders of the swing era include Benny Goodman, Duke Ellington, Count Basie, Jimmie Lunceford, Cab Calloway, Benny Carter, Jimmy Dorsey, Tommy Dorsey, Earl Hines, Bunny Berigan, Harry James, Lionel Hampton, Glenn Miller and Artie Shaw.

== Overview ==
Swing has its roots in 1920s dance music ensembles, which began using new styles of written arrangements, incorporating rhythmic innovations pioneered by Louis Armstrong, Coleman Hawkins, Benny Carter and other jazzmen. The popularity of swing began to decline during the World War II era before being usurped by that of bebop and jump blues.

Swing was blended with other genres to create new musical styles. In country music, artists such as Jimmie Rodgers, Moon Mullican, Milton Brown and Bob Wills introduced elements of swing along with blues to create a genre called "western swing". Belgian guitarist Django Reinhardt helped develop the gypsy swing subgenere, and composed the gypsy swing standard "Minor Swing". In the late 1980s and early 1990s, a new urban-styled swing-beat emerged called new jack swing (New York go-go), created by young producer Teddy Riley. In the late 1990s and early 2000s, there was a swing revival led by Squirrel Nut Zippers, Brian Setzer orchestra and Big Bad Voodoo Daddy.

== 1920s: Roots ==
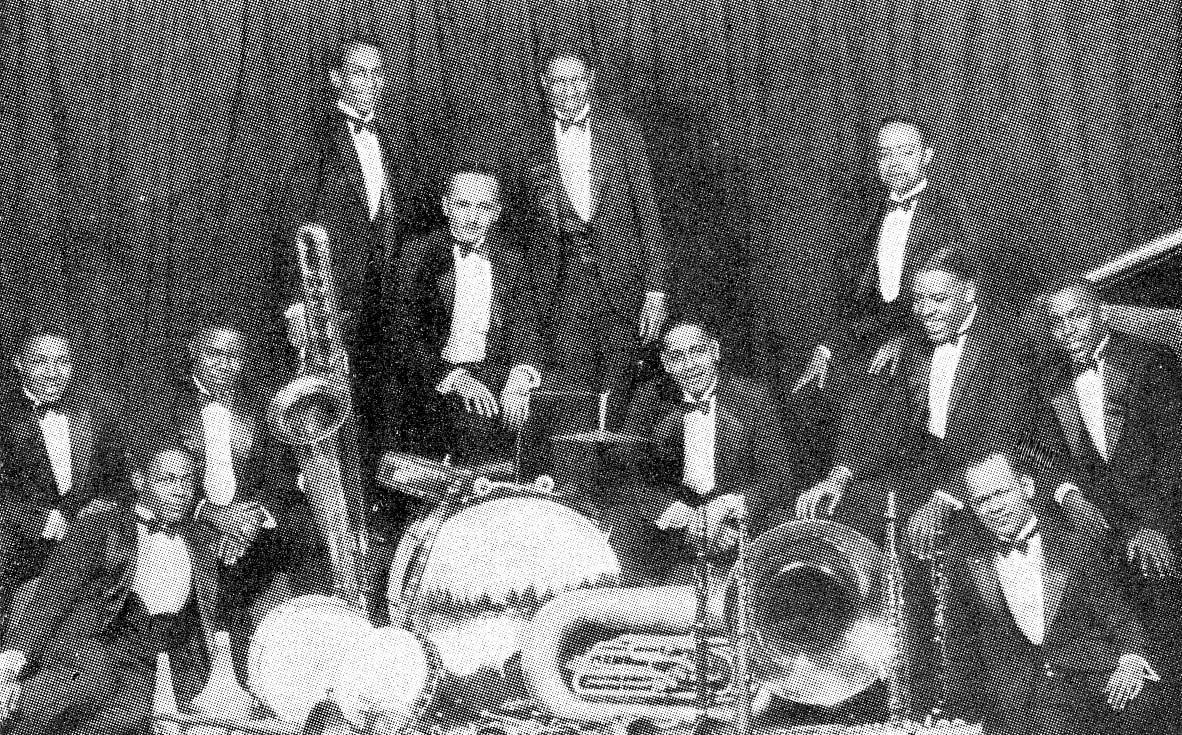
Fletcher Henderson (middle) with his orchestra in 1925. Coleman Hawkins is sitting on the floor to the extreme left with Louis Armstrong above him to the right.

Developments in dance orchestra and jazz music during the 1920s both contributed to the development of the 1930s swing style. Starting in 1923, the Fletcher Henderson Orchestra featured innovative arrangements by Don Redman that featured call-response interplay between brass and reed sections, and interludes arranged to back up soloists. The arrangements also had a smoother rhythmic sense than the ragtime-influenced arrangements that were the more typical "hot" dance music of the day. In 1924, Louis Armstrong joined the Henderson band, lending impetus to an even greater emphasis on soloists. The Henderson band also featured Coleman Hawkins, Benny Carter, and Buster Bailey as soloists, all of whom were influential in the development of swing-era instrumental styles. During the Henderson band's extended residency at the Roseland Ballroom in New York, it became influential on other big bands. Duke Ellington credited the Henderson band with being an early influence when he was developing the sound for his own band. Armstrong left the Henderson band in 1925, and would add his innovations to New Orleans style jazz to develop Chicago style jazz, another step towards swing.

Traditional New Orleans style jazz was based on a two-beat meter and contrapuntal improvisation led by a trumpet or cornet, typically followed by a clarinet and trombone in a call-response pattern. The rhythm section consisted of a sousaphone and drums, and sometimes a banjo. By the early 1920s, guitars and pianos sometimes substituted for the banjo, and a string bass sometimes substituted for the sousaphone. Use of the string bass opened possibilities for 4/4 instead of 2/4 time at faster tempos, which increased rhythmic freedom. The Chicago style released the soloist from the constraints of contrapuntal improvisation with other front-line instruments, lending greater freedom in creating melodic lines. Louis Armstrong used the additional freedom of the new format with 4/4 time, accenting the second and fourth beats and anticipating the main beats with lead-in notes in his solos to create a sense of rhythmic pulse that happened between the beats as well as on them, i.e. swing.

In 1927, Armstrong worked with pianist Earl Hines, who had a similar impact on his instrument as Armstrong had on trumpet. Hines' melodic, horn-like conception of playing deviated from the contemporary conventions in jazz piano centered on building rhythmic patterns around "pivot notes". His approaches to rhythm and phrasing were also free and daring, exploring ideas that would define swing playing. His approach to rhythm often used accents on the lead-in instead of the main beat, and mixed meters, to build a sense of anticipation to the rhythm and make his playing swing. He also used "stops" or musical silences to build tension in his phrasing. Hines' style was a seminal influence on the styles of swing-era pianists Teddy Wilson, Art Tatum, Jess Stacy, Nat "King" Cole, Erroll Garner, Mary Lou Williams and Jay McShann.

Black territory dance bands in the southwest were developing dynamic styles that often went in the direction of blues-based simplicity, using riffs in a call-response pattern to build a strong, danceable rhythm and provide a musical platform for extended solos. The rhythm-heavy tunes for dancing were called "stomps". The requirement for volume led to continued use of the sousaphone over the string bass with the larger ensembles, which dictated a more conservative approach to rhythm based on 2/4 time signatures. Meanwhile, string bass players such as Walter Page were developing their technique to the point where they could hold down the bottom end of a full-sized dance orchestra.

The growth of radio broadcasting and the recording industry in the 1920s allowed some of the more popular dance bands to gain national exposure. The most popular style of dance orchestra was the "sweet" style, often with strings. Paul Whiteman developed a style he called "symphonic jazz", grafting a classical approach over his interpretation of jazz rhythms in an approach he hoped would be the future of jazz. Whiteman's Orchestra enjoyed great commercial success and was a major influence on the sweet bands. Jean Goldkette's Victor Recording Orchestra featured many of the top white jazz musicians of the day, including Bix Beiderbecke, Jimmy Dorsey, Frank Trumbauer, Pee Wee Russell, Eddie Lang, and Joe Venuti. The Victor Recording Orchestra won the respect of the Fletcher Henderson Orchestra in a Battle of the Bands; Henderson's cornetist Rex Stewart credited the Goldkette band with being the most influential white band in the development of swing music before Benny Goodman's. As a dance music promoter and agent, Goldkette also helped organize and promote McKinney's Cotton Pickers and Glen Gray's Orange Blossoms (later the Casa Loma Orchestra), two other Detroit-area bands that were influential in the early swing era.

== Early swing ==
As the 1920s turned to the 1930s, the new concepts in rhythm and ensemble playing that comprised the swing style were transforming the sounds of large and small bands. Starting in 1928, the Earl Hines Orchestra was broadcast throughout much of the Midwest from the Grand Terrace Cafe in Chicago, where Hines had the opportunity to expound upon his new approaches to rhythm and phrasing with a big band. Hines' arranger Jimmy Mundy would later contribute to the catalog of the Benny Goodman Orchestra. The Duke Ellington Orchestra had its new sounds broadcast nationally from New York's Cotton Club, followed by the Cab Calloway Orchestra and the Jimmie Lunceford Orchestra. Also in New York, the Fletcher Henderson Orchestra featured the new style at the Roseland Ballroom and the swing powerhouse Chick Webb Orchestra started its extended stay at the Savoy Ballroom in 1931. Bennie Moten and the Kansas City Orchestra showcased the riff-propelled, solo-oriented form of swing that had been developing in the hothouse of Kansas City. Emblematic of the evolving music was the change in the name of Moten's signature tune, from "Moten Stomp" to "Moten Swing". Moten's orchestra had a highly successful tour in late 1932. Audiences raved about the new music, and at the Pearl Theatre in Philadelphia in December 1932, the doors were let open to the public who crammed into the theatre to hear the new sound, demanding seven encores from Moten's orchestra.

With the early 1930s came the financial difficulties of the Great Depression, which curtailed recording of the new music and drove some bands out of business, including the Fletcher Henderson Orchestra and McKinney's Cotton Pickers in 1934. Henderson's next business was selling arrangements to up-and-coming bandleader Benny Goodman.

At this time, "sweet" dance music remained most popular with white audiences and was successfully showcased by bandleaders such as Guy Lombardo and Shep Fields. However, the Casa Loma Orchestra and the Benny Goodman Orchestra went against that grain, targeting the new swing style to younger audiences. Despite Benny Goodman's claim that "sweet" music was a "weak sister" as compared to the "real music" of America, Lombardo's band enjoyed widespread popularity for decades while crossing over racial divides, and was even praised by Louis Armstrong as one of his favorites.

== 1935–1946: The swing era ==
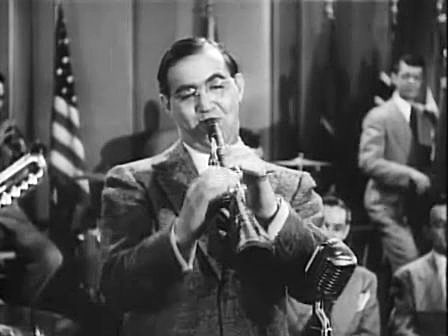
Benny Goodman, one of the first swing bandleaders to achieve widespread fame

In 1935, the Benny Goodman Orchestra had won a spot on the radio show Let's Dance and started showcasing an updated repertoire featuring Fletcher Henderson arrangements. Goodman's slot was after midnight in the East, and few people heard it. It was broadcast earlier on the West Coast and developed the audience that later led to Goodman's Palomar Ballroom triumph. At the Palomar engagement starting on August 21, 1935, audiences of young white dancers favored Goodman's rhythm and daring arrangements. The sudden success of the Goodman orchestra transformed the landscape of popular music in America. Goodman's success with "hot" swing brought forth imitators and enthusiasts of the new style throughout the world of dance bands, which launched the "swing era" that lasted until 1946.

A typical song played in swing style would feature a strong, anchoring rhythm section in support of more loosely-tied woodwind and brass sections playing call-response to each other. The level of improvisation that the audience might expect varied with the arrangement, song, band, and band-leader. Typically included in big band swing arrangements were an introductory chorus that stated the theme, choruses arranged for soloists, and climactic out-choruses. Some arrangements were built entirely around a featured soloist or vocalist. Some bands used string or vocal sections, or both. Swing-era repertoire included the Great American Songbook of Tin Pan Alley standards, band originals, traditional jazz tunes (such as the "King Porter Stomp", with which the Goodman orchestra had a smash hit) and blues.

Hot swing music is strongly associated with the jitterbug dancing that became a national craze accompanying the swing craze. Swing dancing originated in the late 1920s as the "Lindy Hop", and would later incorporate other styles including the Suzie Q, Truckin', Peckin' Jive, the Big Apple and the Shag in various combinations of moves. A subculture of jitterbuggers, sometimes growing quite competitive, congregated around ballrooms that featured hot swing music. A dance floor full of jitterbuggers had cinematic appeal; they were sometimes featured in newsreels and movies. Some of the top jitterbuggers gathered in professional dance troupes such as Whitey's Lindy Hoppers, featured in the films Everybody Dance (1936), A Day At the Races (1937), and Hellzapoppin' (1941). Swing dancing would outlive the swing era, becoming associated with rhythm and blues and early rock and roll.

As with many new popular musical styles, swing met with some resistance because of its improvisation, tempo, occasionally risqué lyrics, and frenetic dancing. Audiences used to traditional "sweet" arrangements, such as those offered by Guy Lombardo, Sammy Kaye, Kay Kyser and Shep Fields, were taken aback by the rambunctiousness of swing music. Swing was sometimes regarded as light entertainment, more of an industry to sell records to the masses than a form of art, among fans of both jazz and "serious" music. Some jazz critics such as Hugues Panassié held the polyphonic improvisation of New Orleans jazz to be the pure form of jazz, with swing a form corrupted by regimentation and commercialism. Panassié was also an advocate of the theory that jazz was a primal expression of the black American experience, and that white musicians, or black musicians who became interested in more sophisticated musical ideas, were generally incapable of expressing its core values. In his 1941 autobiography, W. C. Handy wrote that "prominent white orchestra leaders, concert singers and others are making commercial use of Negro music in its various phases. That's why they introduced 'swing' which is not a musical form" (no comment on Fletcher Henderson, Earl Hines, Duke Ellington, or Count Basie). The Dixieland revival started in the late 1930s as a self-conscious recreation of New Orleans jazz, in reaction against the orchestrated style of big band swing. Some swing bandleaders saw opportunities in the Dixieland revival. Tommy Dorsey's Clambake Seven and Bob Crosby's Bobcats were examples of Dixieland ensembles within big swing bands.

Between the poles of hot and sweet, middlebrow interpretations of swing led to great commercial success for bands such as those led by Artie Shaw, Glenn Miller, and Tommy Dorsey. Miller's trademark clarinet-led reed section was decidedly "sweet", but the Miller catalog had no shortage of bouncy, medium-tempo dance tunes and some up-tempo tunes such as "Mission to Moscow" and the Lionel Hampton composition "Flying Home". Dorsey, the "Sentimental Gentleman of Swing", made a nod to the hot side by hiring jazz trumpeter and Goodman alumni Bunny Berigan, then hiring Jimmie Lunceford's arranger Sy Oliver to spice up his catalog in 1939.

New York became a touchstone for national success of big bands, and nationally broadcast engagements at the Roseland and Savoy ballrooms signified a swing band's arrival on the national scene. With its Savoy engagement in 1937, the Count Basie Orchestra brought the riff-and-solo oriented Kansas City style of swing to national attention. The Basie orchestra collectively and individually would influence later styles that would give rise to the smaller "jump" bands and bebop. The Chick Webb Orchestra remained closely identified with the Savoy Ballroom, having originated the tune "Stompin' at the Savoy", and became feared in the Savoy's Battles of the Bands. It humiliated Goodman's band, and had memorable encounters with the Ellington and Basie bands. The Goodman band's 1938 concert at Carnegie Hall turned into a summit of swing, with guests from the Basie and Ellington bands invited for a jam session after the Goodman band's performance. In 1939, Coleman Hawkins arrived back from an extended stay in Europe to New York, recorded his famous version of "Body and Soul", and fronted his own big band. 1940 saw top-flight musicians such as Charlie Parker, Dizzy Gillespie, Don Byas, Charlie Christian and Gene Ramey, whose careers in swing had brought them to New York, beginning to coalesce and develop the ideas that would become bebop.

== 1940s: Decline ==
The early 1940s saw emerging trends in popular music and jazz that would, once they had run their course, result in the end of the swing era. Vocalists were becoming the star attractions of the big bands. After joining the Chick Webb Orchestra in 1936, vocalist Ella Fitzgerald propelled the band to great popularity, and the band continued under her name after Webb's death in 1939. In 1940, vocalist Vaughn Monroe was leading his own big band, and Frank Sinatra was becoming the star attraction of the Tommy Dorsey Orchestra, inciting mass hysteria among bobby-soxers. Vocalist Peggy Lee joined the Goodman Orchestra in 1941 for a two-year stint, and quickly became its star attraction on its biggest hits. Some big bands were moving away from the swing styles that dominated the late 1930s, for both commercial and creative reasons. Some of the more commercial big bands catered to more "sweet" sensibilities with string sections, and some bandleaders such as John Kirby, Raymond Scott, and Claude Thornhill fused swing with classical repertoire. Lower manpower requirements and simplicity favored the rise of small band swing. The Savoy Sultans and other smaller bands led by Louis Jordan, Lucky Millinder, Louis Prima and Tony Pastor were showcasing an exuberant "jump swing" style that would lead to the post-war rise of rhythm and blues. In a 1939 DownBeat article, Duke Ellington expressed dissatisfaction with the creative state of swing music; within a few years, he and other bandleaders would be delving into more ambitious, and less danceable, forms of orchestral jazz and the creative forefront for soloists would be moving into smaller ensembles and bebop. In 1943, the Earl Hines Orchestra featured a collection of young, forward-looking musicians who were at the core of the bebop movement and would be in the Billy Eckstine Orchestra, the first big band to showcase bebop, the following year. As the swing era went into decline, it secured legacies in vocalist-centered popular music, "progressive" big band jazz, rhythm and blues, and bebop.

The trend away from big-band swing was accelerated by wartime conditions and royalty conflicts. In 1941, the American Society of Composers, Authors and Publishers (ASCAP) demanded bigger royalties from broadcasters. When the broadcasters refused, ASCAP banned the large repertoire they controlled from airplay, severely restricting what radio audiences could hear. ASCAP also demanded pre-approval of set lists and even written solos for live broadcasts, in order to assure that not even a quoted fragment of ASCAP's repertoire was broadcast. These restrictions made broadcast swing much less appealing for the year in which the ban was in place. Big band swing remained popular during the war years, but the resources required to support it became problematic. Wartime restriction on travel, coupled with rising expenses, curtailed road touring. The manpower requirements for big swing bands placed a burden on the scarce resources available for touring and were impacted by the military draft. In July 1942, the American Federation of Musicians called a ban on recording until record labels agreed to pay royalties to musicians. The strike stopped recording of instrumental music for major labels for over a year, with the last labels agreeing to new contract terms in November 1944. In the meantime, vocalists continued to record backed by vocal groups, and the recording industry released earlier swing recordings from their vaults, increasingly reflecting the popularity of big band vocalists. In 1943, Columbia Records re-released the 1939 recording of "All or Nothing at All" by the Harry James Orchestra with Frank Sinatra, giving Sinatra top billing ("Acc. Harry James and his Orchestra"). The recording found the commercial success that had eluded its original release. Small band swing was recorded for small specialty labels not affected by the ban. These labels had limited distribution centered in large urban markets, which tended to limit the size of the ensembles with which recording could be a money-making proposition. Another blow fell on the market for dance-oriented swing in 1944, when the federal government levied a 30% excise tax on "dancing" nightclubs, undercutting the market for dance music in smaller venues.

== 1950s–1960s ==
=== Swingin' pop ===
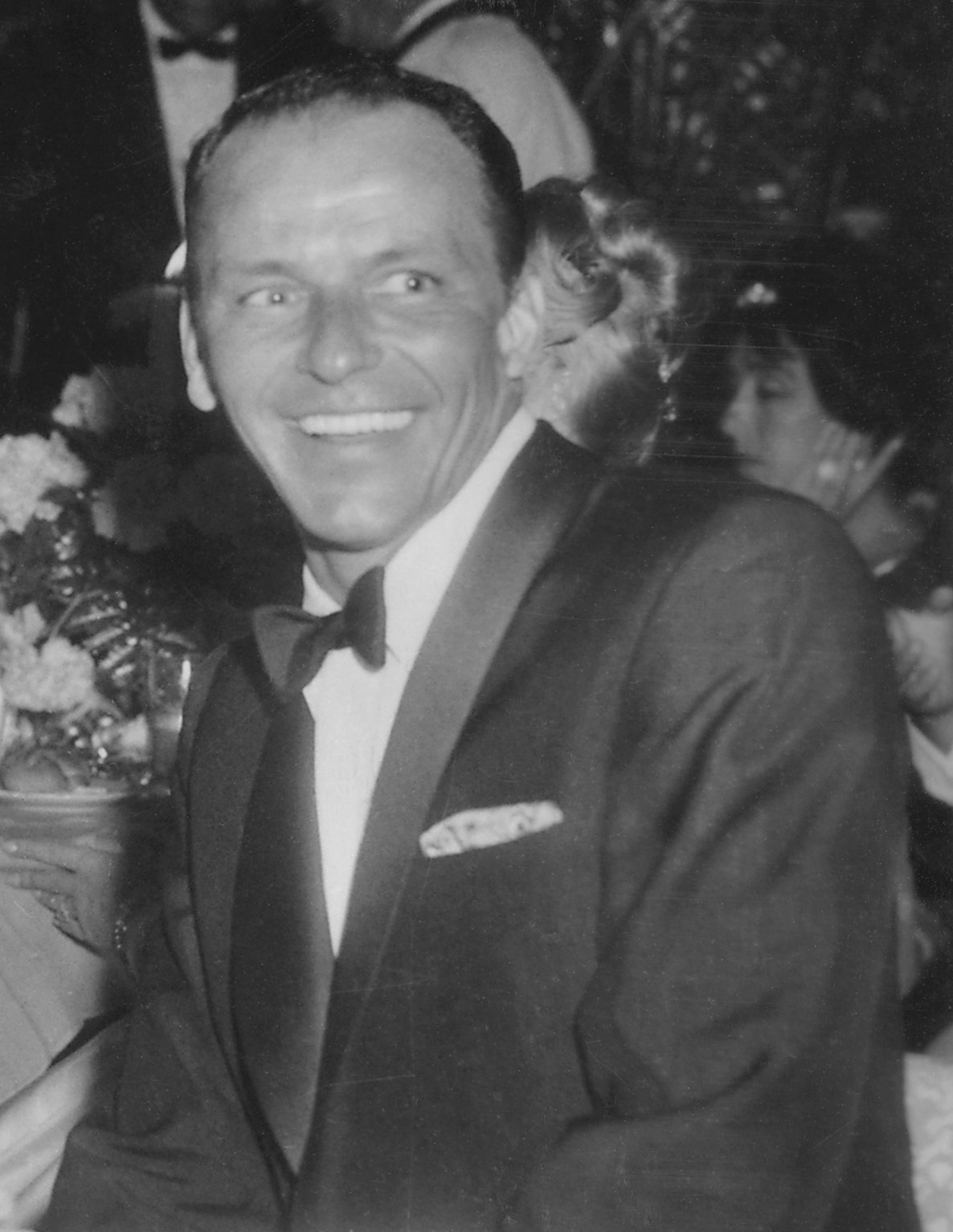
Frank Sinatra

Swing bands and sales continued to decline in 1953 and 1954. In 1955, a list of top recording artists from the previous year was publicly released, which revealed that big band sales had decreased since the early 1950s. However, big band music saw a revival in the 1950s and 1960s. One impetus was the demand for studio and stage orchestras as backups for popular vocalists, and in radio and television broadcasts. Ability to adapt performing styles to various situations was an essential skill among these bands-for-hire, with a somewhat sedated version of swing in common use for backing up vocalists. The resurgent commercial success of Frank Sinatra with a mildly swinging backup during the mid-1950s solidified the trend. It became a sound associated with pop vocalists such as Bobby Darin, Dean Martin, Judy Garland and Nat King Cole, as well as jazz-oriented vocalists such as Ella Fitzgerald and Keely Smith. Many of these singers were also involved in the "less swinging" vocal pop music of this period. The bands in these contexts performed in relative anonymity, receiving secondary credit beneath the top billing. Some, such as the Nelson Riddle, Billy May, and Gordon Jenkins Orchestras, became well known in their own right, with Riddle particularly associated with the success of Sinatra and Cole. Swinging pop remained popular into the mid-1960s, becoming one current of the easy listening genre.

=== Big band jazz ===
Big band jazz made a comeback as well. The Stan Kenton and Woody Herman bands maintained their popularity during lean years of the late 1940s and beyond, making their mark with innovative arrangements and high-level jazz soloists (Shorty Rogers, Art Pepper, Kai Winding, Stan Getz, Al Cohn, Zoot Sims, Serge Chaloff, Gene Ammons and Sal Nistico). Lionel Hampton was a leader in the R&B genre during the late 1940s then re-entered big band jazz in the early 1950s, remaining a popular attraction through the 1960s. Count Basie and Duke Ellington had both downsized their big bands during the first half of the 1950s before reconstituting them by 1956. Ellington's venture back into big band jazz was encouraged by its reception at the 1956 Newport Jazz Festival. The Basie and Ellington bands flourished creatively and commercially through the 1960s and beyond, with both veteran leaders receiving high acclaim for their contemporary work and performing until they were physically unable. Drummer Buddy Rich, after briefly leading one big band during the late 1940s and performing in various jazz and big band gigs, formed his definitive big band in 1966. His name became synonymous with the dynamic, exuberant style of his big band. Other big jazz bands that drove the 1950s–1960s revival include those led by Thad Jones, Mel Lewis, Quincy Jones and Oliver Nelson. Big band jazz remains a major component of college jazz instruction curricula.

== Cross-genre swing ==
Some artists in country music, such as Jimmie Rodgers, Moon Mullican, and Bob Wills, combined elements of swing and blues to create a Western swing. Mullican left the Cliff Bruner band to pursue a solo career that included many songs maintaining a swing structure. Artists like Willie Nelson and Asleep at the Wheel have continued the swing elements of country music. Asleep at the Wheel has also recorded the Count Basie tunes "One O'Clock Jump", "Jumpin' at the Woodside", and "Song of the Wanderer" using a steel guitar as a stand-in for a horn section. Nat King Cole followed Sinatra into pop music, bringing with him a similar combination of swing and ballads. Like Mullican, he was important in bringing piano to the fore of popular music.

Gypsy swing is an outgrowth of the jazz violin swing of Joe Venuti and Eddie Lang. In Europe, it was heard in the music of guitarist Django Reinhardt and violinist Stéphane Grappelli. Their repertoire overlaps 1930s swing, including French popular music, gypsy songs, and compositions by Reinhardt, but gypsy swing bands are formulated differently. There is no brass or percussion; guitars and bass form the backbone, with violin, accordion, clarinet or guitar taking the lead. Gypsy swing groups generally have no more than five players. Although they originated in different continents, similarities have often been noted between gypsy swing and Western swing, leading to various fusions.

Rock hitmakers such as Fats Domino and Elvis Presley included swing-era standards in their repertoire, making crooning ballads "Are You Lonesome Tonight?" and "My Blue Heaven" into rock and roll-era hits. The doo-wop vocal group the Marcels had a big hit with their lively version of the swing-era ballad "Blue Moon".

Multi-genre mandolinist Jethro Burns is known for playing swing, jazz, and other forms of the genre on the mandolin. He produced albums that feature jazz rhythms and swing chord progressions, and is often considered the "Father of Jazz Mandolin".

== 1960s–2000: Big band nostalgia and swing revival ==
Though swing music was no longer mainstream, fans could attend "Big Band Nostalgia" tours from the 1970s into the 1980s. The tours featured bandleaders and vocalists of the swing era who were semi-retired, such as Harry James and vocalist Dick Haymes. Historically themed radio broadcasts featuring period comedy, melodrama, and music also played a role in sustaining interest in the music of the swing era.

Dan Hicks and His Hot Licks, and later David Grisman, presented adaptations of gypsy swing, rekindling interest in the musical form. Other swing revivals occurred during the 1970s. The jazz, R&B, and swing revival vocal group the Manhattan Transfer and Bette Midler included swing-era hits on their albums during the early 1970s. In Seattle, the New Deal Rhythm Band revived 1930s swing with a dose of comedy behind vocalists Phil "De Basket" Shallat and Cheryl "Benzene" Bentyne. Bentyne would leave the New Deal Rhythm Band in 1978 for her long career with Manhattan Transfer. John Holte, founding leader of the New Deal Rhythm Band, led swing revival bands in the Seattle area until 2003.

A swing revival occurred during the 1990s and 2000s, led by Royal Crown Revue, Big Bad Voodoo Daddy, the Cherry Poppin' Daddies, Squirrel Nut Zippers, Lavay Smith, and Brian Setzer. Many of the bands played neo-swing which combined swing with rockabilly, ska, and rock. The music brought a revival in swing dancing.

Robbie Williams's 2001 album Swing When You're Winning consisted mainly of popular swing covers, and eventually sold more than seven million copies worldwide. In 2013, Robbie Williams released Swings Both Ways.

== 1990s–present: Swing house, electro swing, and swing pop ==
Another modern development consists of fusing swing (original, or remixes of classics) with hip-hop and house techniques. "Swing house" is a sub genre of swing that has been influenced by the likes of Louis Jordan and Louis Prima. Electro swing is mainly popular in Europe, with artists incorporating influences such as tango and Django Reinhardt's gypsy swing. Leading artists include Caravan Palace and Parov Stelar, who became popular during the 2010s. Musically, electro swing is a misnomer, as it usually samples music from the earlier Charleston era of the 1920s and does not actually swing. Both genres of swing house and electro swing have been connected with the revival of swing dances, such as the Lindy Hop.

== See also ==
- Big band
- Gypsy jazz
- Interbellum Generation
- Lindy Hop
- List of music styles
- Lost Generation
- Swing (dance)
- Swing (jazz performance style)
- Original Dixieland Jass Band
