= Benny Davis =

American songwriter (1895–1979)

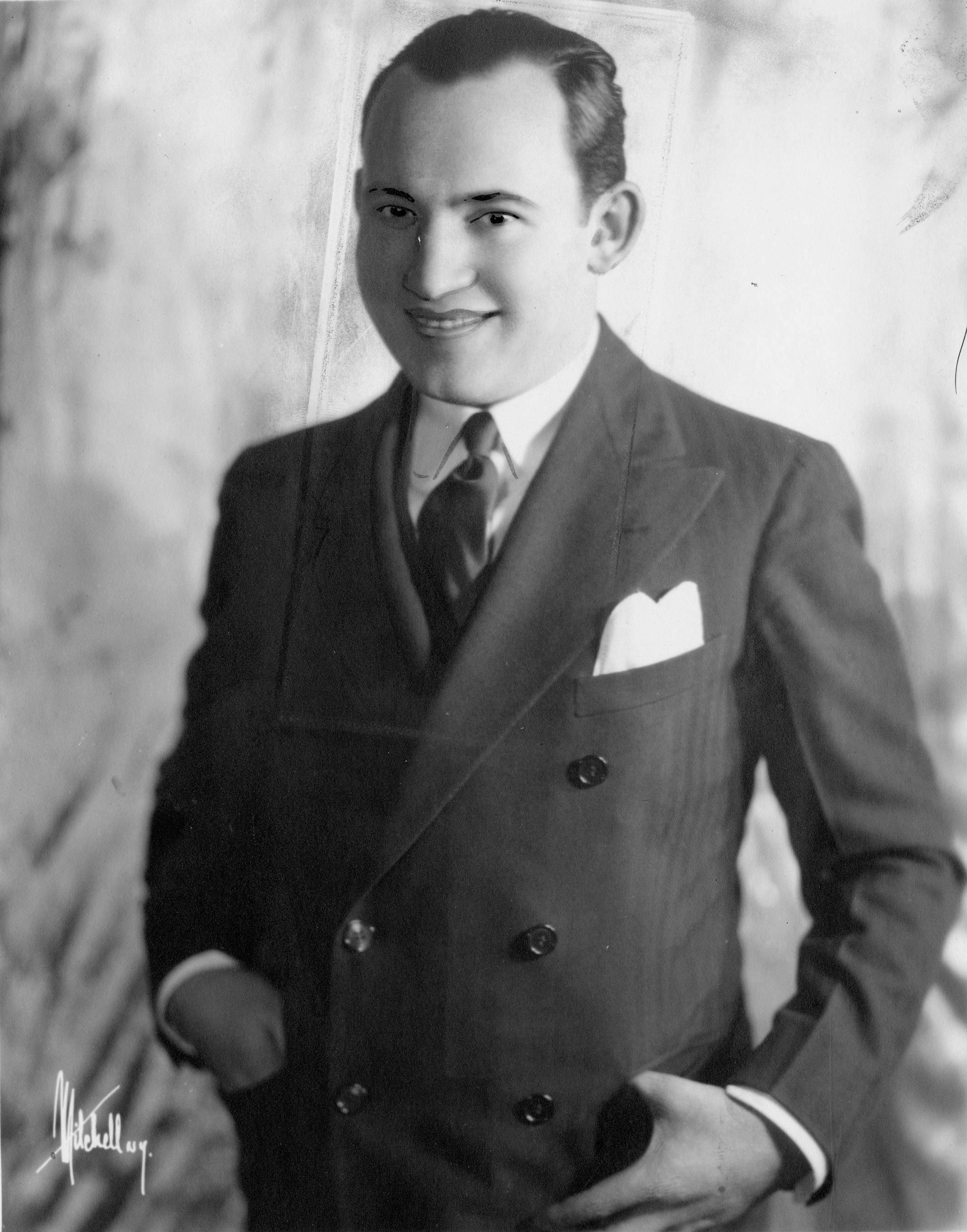

Background information
- Born: August 21, 1895
- Origin: New York City, U.S.
- Died: December 20, 1979 (aged 84) Miami, Florida, U.S.
- Occupations: vaudeville performer, Songwriter

Benny Davis (August 21, 1895 - December 20, 1979) was a vaudeville performer and writer of popular songs.

== Biography ==
Davis started performing in vaudeville in his teens. He began writing songs when working as an accompanist for Blossom Seeley. In 1917, he wrote "So Long Sammy" with Jack Yellen and "Good-Bye Broadway. Hello France" with C. Francis Reisner.

His first success was 1920's "Margie", with music by Con Conrad and J. Russel Robinson. His most popular song was "Baby Face", written in 1926 with Harry Akst. For Broadway, Davis wrote the score for the 1927 edition of Artists and Models and for the 1929 show Sons o' Guns. His career lasted until the mid-1930s.

Davis's liberal use of false rhymes in his songs was scorned by some pure practitioners of the craft, and prompted Howard Dietz to compose a couplet: "Heaven Save Us|From Benny Davis." Nevertheless, Davis was voted into the Songwriters Hall of Fame in 1975.

Davis died in December 1979, aged 84, in Miami, Florida.
