= Palesteena =

"Palesteena, or, Lena from Palesteena"
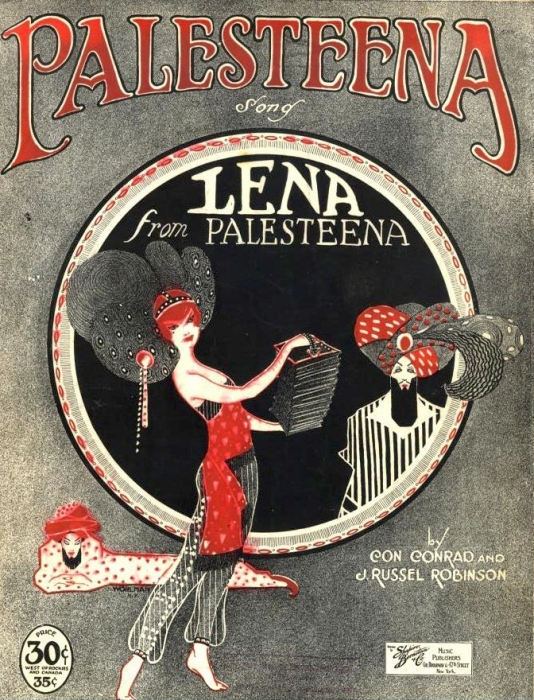
- 1920 sheet music cover, Shapiro, Bernstein & Company, New York.

Song by Original Dixieland Jass Band
- A-side: "Margie"
- Published: 1920
- Released: February 1921
- Recorded: December 4, 1920
- Genre: Dixieland
- Label: Victor 18717
- Composer: J. Russell Robinson
- Lyricist: Conrad Dober

Audio sample
- Original recording of Palesteena, performed by Original Dixieland Jazz Band (1920): file; help

"Palesteena", or, "Lena from Palesteena", is a 1920 song with lyrics by Con Conrad and music by J. Russell Robinson.

== Background ==
It was originally recorded and performed by the Original Dixieland Jass Band, a band of New Orleans jazz musicians, who released it as an instrumental as a Victor 78, 18717-B, in 1920. The A side was "Margie", a jazz and pop standard, paired in a medley with "Singin' the Blues". J. Russel Robinson, the pianist in the ODJB, co-wrote the music for all three songs. The song was published by Shapiro, Bernstein & Company in New York in 1920. The melody has a strong Klezmer influence, with the chorus based on a phrase from "Nokh A Bisl" by J. Kammen.

== Other recordings ==
Eddie Cantor and Frank Crumit also recorded the song. Bob Crosby recorded the song on Decca Records in 1938. Vincent Lopez recorded the song on Columbia Records.

== Lyrics ==
In the Bronx of New York City
Lived a girl, she's not so pretty;
Lena is her name.
Such a clever girl is Lena!
How she played her concertina,
Really, it's a shame.

She's such a good musician
She got a swell position
To go across the sea to entertain.
And so they shipped poor Lena
Way out to Palesteena
From what they tell me, she don't look the same.

They say that Lena is the Queen o' Palesteena
Just because she plays the concertina.
She only knows one song,
She plays it all day long.
Sometimes she plays it wrong,
But still they love it, want more of it.

I heard her play once or twice.
Oh! Murder! Still, it was nice.
All the girls, they dress like Lena.
Some wear oatmeal, some Farina
Down old Palesteena way.

Lena's girlfriend Arabella
Let her meet an Arab fella
Who she thought was grand.
On a camel's back a-swaying
You could hear Miss Lena playing
Over the desert sand.

She didn't know the new ones
All she knew were blue ones
And Yusef sat and listened all day long
(or: Till Yusef sat and listened in his tent)
And as he tried to kiss her
You heard that Arab whisper,
"Oh Lena, how I love to hear your song!"
(or: "Oh Lena, how I love your instrument!")

They say that Lena is the Queen o' Palesteena
'Cause she shakes a wicked concertina.
She plays it day and night
She plays with all her might
She never gets it right,
You think it's funny,
Gets her money.

There's nothin' sounds like it should.
So rotten, it's really good.
While the Arabs danced so gaily
She would practice "Eli Eli"
Down old Palesteena way.

Lena, she's the Queen o' Palesteena.
Goodness, how they love her concertina.
Each movement of her wrist
Just makes them shake and twist;
They simply can't resist.
How they love it
Want more of it.

When she squeeks
That squeeze-box stuff,
All those sheiks
Just can't get enough.
She got fat but she got leaner (pr. "lee-na")
Pushing on her concertina
Down old Palesteena way.

== Sources ==
- Stewart, Jack. "The Original Dixieland Jazz Band's Place in the Development of Jazz." New Orleans International Music Colloquium, 2005.
- Lange, Horst H. Wie der Jazz begann: 1916-1923, von der "Original Dixieland Jazz Band" bis zu King Olivers "Creole Jazz Band". Berlin: Colloquium Verlag, 1991. ISBN 3-7678-0779-3
- Brunn, H.O. The Story of the Original Dixieland Jazz Band. Baton Rouge: Louisiana State University Press, 1960. Reprinted by Da Capo Press, 1977. ISBN 0-306-70892-2
