= Con Conrad =

American songwriter, record producer (1891–1938)

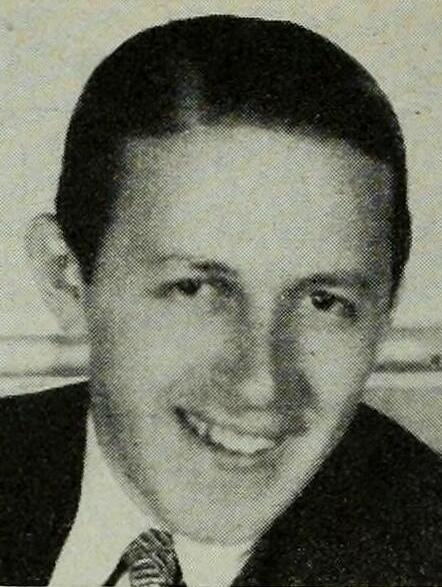
- Conrad c. September 1929

Background information
- Born: Conrad K. Dober; June 18, 1891; Manhattan, New York, United States
- Origin: New York City
- Died: September 28, 1938 (aged 47) Van Nuys, California, United States
- Genres: Stage and film scores
- Occupations: Songwriter, producer
- Awards: Inductee to Songwriters Hall of Fame; Academy Award for Best Original Score

Conrad K. Dober June 18, 1891 – September 28, 1938), composing and publishing under the name Con Conrad, was an American songwriter and Broadway producer. He wrote numerous scores for stage and film, as well as several jazz and pop standards.

He co-wrote the jazz and pop standard "Margie" and the Grammy Hall of Fame inductee "Singin' the Blues".

He was inducted in the Songwriters Hall of Fame in 1979.

== Biography ==
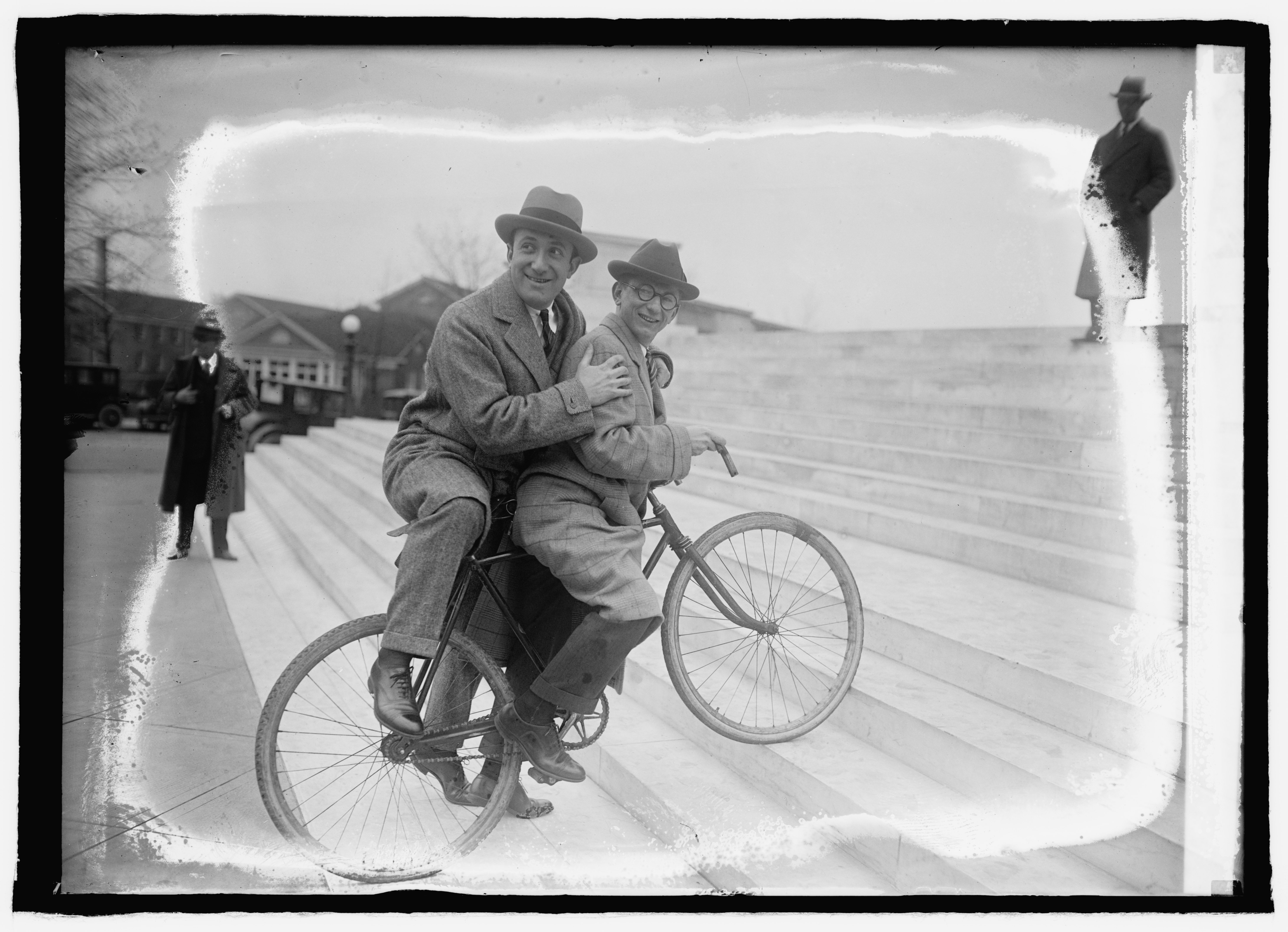
Con Conrad and Irving Caesar, 1924

Conrad was born in Manhattan, New York, and published his first song, "Down in Dear Old New Orleans", in 1912. Conrad produced the Broadway show The Honeymoon Express, starring Al Jolson, in 1913.

By 1918, Conrad was writing and publishing with Henry Waterson (1873–1933). He co-composed "Margie" in 1920 with J. Russel Robinson and lyricist Benny Davis, which became his first major hit. He went on to compose hits that became standards, including:

- "Palesteena" with co-composer and co-lyricist J. Russel Robinson (1920)
- "Singin' the Blues" with co-composer J. Russel Robinson and lyricists Sam M. Lewis and Joe Young (1920)
- "You've Got to See Mama Ev'ry Night" with co-composer and co-lyricist Billy Rose (1923)
- "Come on Spark Plug" with co-composer and co-lyricist Billy Rose (1923)
- "Barney Google" with co-composer and co-lyricist Billy Rose (1923)
- "Memory Lane" with lyricist Buddy DeSylva and co-composer Larry Spier (1924)
- "Lonesome and Sorry" with lyricist Benny Davis (1926)
- "Ma! He's Making Eyes at Me" with lyricist Sidney Clare (1928)

== Stage and film ==
In 1923, Conrad focused on the stage and wrote the scores for the Broadway shows: The Greenwich Village Follies, Moonlight, Betty Lee, Kitty’s Kisses and Americana. In 1924 the Longacre Theatre staged the small musical Moonlight, with a score by Conrad and William B. Friedlander. The next year Conrad and Friedlander's Mercenary Mary was presented at the Longacre. In 1929, Conrad moved to Hollywood after losing all of his money on unsuccessful shows. There he worked on films such as Fox Movietone Follies, Palmy Days, The Gay Divorcee and Here’s to Romance.

== Awards and honours ==
Conrad was the inaugural recipient of the first Academy Award for Best Song for The Continental in 1934 with collaborator Herb Magidson.

Conrad was posthumously inducted into the Songwriters Hall of Fame in 1979

== Personal life and death ==
Conrad died in 1938 in Van Nuys, California at age 47 after a long illness.

His spouse was actress Francine Larrimore.
