= Marty Grosz =

Jazz musician

- Born: Martin Oliver Grosz; February 28, 1930 (age 96); Berlin, Germany
- Genres: Jazz, dixieland, swing
- Occupation: Musician
- Instruments: Guitar, banjo, vocals
- Years active: 1950–present
- Labels: Jazzology, Riverside, Stomp Off, Arbors
- Website: www.martygrosz.com

Martin Oliver Grosz (born February 28, 1930) is a German-born American jazz guitarist, banjoist, vocalist, and composer born in Berlin, Germany, the son of artist George Grosz. He performed with Bob Wilber and wrote arrangements for him. He has also worked with Kenny Davern, Dick Sudhalter, and Keith Ingham.

Marty Grosz is influenced by the Jazz guitarists of the 1930s, particularly Carl Kress, and uses a lower Banjo derived tuning for his guitar similar to that used by Kress. This produces a much more robust sound for both rhythm playing and chord solo breaks.

Grosz is also known as a witty raconteur often introducing songs with long amusing anecdotes.

== Career ==
Grosz was born in Berlin, Germany, but became resident in the United States by the age of three. In Chicago during the 1950s, Grosz recorded with Dave Remington and Art Hodes. In the 1970s, he was a vocalist and rhythm guitarist for the Soprano Summit In the 1980s, he was a member of the Classic Jazz Quartet with Dick Wellstood. He played, sang, and wrote most of the group's arrangements. He has also performed at concerts with Joe Pass, Herb Ellis, and Charlie Byrd.

== Discography ==
=== As leader ===
- Hooray for Bix! (Riverside, 1957)
- The End of Innocence with Ephie Resnick (Silver Crest, 1964)
- Let Your Fingers Do the Walking with Wayne Wright (Aviva, 1977)
- Take Me to the Land of Jazz with Dick Wellstood (Aviva, 1978)
- Goody Goody with Wayne Wright (Aviva, 1979)
- I Hope Gabriel Likes My Music (Aviva, 1982)
- The Classic Jazz Quartet (Jazzology, 1985)
- MCMLXXXVI with the Classic Jazz Quartet (Stomp Off, 1986)
- Marty Grosz and the Keepers of the Flame (and the Imps) (Stomp Off, 1987)
- Sings of Love and Other Matters (Statiras, 1987)
- Swing It! (Jazzology, 1988)
- Extra (Jazzology, 1989)
- Laughing at Life (Stomp Off, 1991)
- Unsaturated Fats with Keith Ingham (Stomp Off, 1991)
- Donaldson Redux with Keith Ingham (Stomp Off, 1992)
- Songs I Learned at My Mothers Knee and Other Low Joints (Jazzology, 1993)
- Ring Dem Bells (Nagel-Heyer, 1995)
- Just Imagine with Keith Ingham (Stomp Off, 1995)
- Thanks (Jazzology, 1997)
- Just for Fun! (Nagel Heyer, 1997)
- Going Hollywood with Keith Ingham (Stomp Off, 1997)
- Rhythm for Sale (Jazzology, 1997)
- At Bob Barnard's Jazz Party 1999 (Nif Nuf, 1999)
- Left to His Own Devices (Jazzology, 2000)
- Rhythm Is Our Business (Sackville, 2003)
- Stringin' the Blues: A Tribute to Eddie Lang with Bucky Pizzarelli, Frank Vignola, Howard Alden, Al Viola (Jazzology, 2003)
- Chasin' the Spots (Jump, 2005)
- Acoustic Heat with Mike Peters (Sackville, 2006)
- Marty Grosz and His Hot Combination (Arbors, 2006)
- The James P. Johnson Songbook (Arbors, 2011)
- Keep a Song in Your Soul (Jazzology, 2014)

=== As sideman or guest ===
With Randy Sandke and the New York All Stars

- Stampede (Jazzology, 1992)
- Play Jazz Favorites (Nagel-Heyer, 1993)
- The Bix Beiderbecke Era (Nagel-Heyer, 1993)
- Randy Sandke Meets Bix Beiderbecke (Nagel-Heyer, 2002)

With Soprano Summit

- Soprano Summit in Concert (Concord Jazz, 1976)
- Chalumeau Blue (Chiaroscuro, 1976)
- Soprano Summit Live at the Big Horn Jazzfest (Jazzology, 1976)
- Crazy Rhythm (Chiaroscuro, 1977)
- Live at Concord '77 (Concord Jazz, 1978)
- Soprano Summit (Chiaroscuro, 1994)
- Recorded Live at Illiana Jazz Club, November 7, 1978 (Storyville, 1996)
- 1975...and More! (Arbors, 2008)

With others

- Ruby Braff, Bobby Hackett, Ralph Sutton, Recovered Treasures (Jump, 2006)
- Jim Cullum Jr., New Year's All Star Jam (Pacific Vista 1993)
- Wild Bill Davison, Exactly Like You (Nagel-Heyer, 1996)
- Peter Ecklund, Strings Attached (Arbors, 1996)
- Peter Ecklund, Peter Ecklund and the Melody Makers (Stomp Off, 1988)
- Don Ewell, Yellow Dog Blues (Audiophile, 1959)
- Bob Greene, World of Jelly Roll Morton (G.H.B. 1998)
- Bob Haggart & Yank Lawson, World's Greatest Jazzband of Bob Haggart & Yank Lawson (Timeless, 1988)
- Terra Hazelton, Anybody's Baby (HealeyOphonic, 2004)
- Jeff Healey, Adventures in Jazzland (Healey Ophonic 2004)
- Art Hodes, Cat on the Keys (Concert-Disc 1961)
- Art Hodes, Some Legendary Art (Audiophile, 1986)
- Dick Hyman, Bob Wilber, Music of Jelly Roll Morton for Solo Piano, Trio, Quartet & Septet (Smithsonian 1978)
- Jim Kweskin, (Jump, for Joy (Universe, 2003)
- Barbara Lea, Ed Polcer, at the Atlanta Jazz Party (Jazzology, 1993)
- Max Morath, Dick Sudhalter, In Jazz Country (Vanguard, 1979)
- Albert Nicholas, Albert's Back in Town (Delmark, 1959)
- Ed Polcer, Coast to Coast Swingin' Jazz (Jazzology, 1991)
- Jabbo Smith, Hidden Treasure Vol 1 (Jazz Art 1984)
- Jabbo Smith, Hidden Treasure Vol 2 (Jazz Art 1984)
- Dick Sudhalter, Connie Jones, Get Out and Get Under the Moon (Stomp Off, 1990)
- Maxine Sullivan, Great Songs from the Cotton Club (Mobile Fidelity, 1984)
- Maxine Sullivan, Keith Ingham, Together (Atlantic, 1987)
