= Tailspin (disambiguation) =

A tailspin is a rapid, high-rotation descent of an airplane.

Tailspin or Tail Spin may also refer to:

== Film ==
- Tail Spin, a 1939 aviation film
- Tailspin: Behind the Korean Airliner Tragedy, the American title of the 1989 British film Coded Hostile

== Literature ==
- TailSpin, a 2008 novel by Catherine Coulter
- Tailspin, a 2018 novel by Sandra Brown
- Tailspin: The People and Forces Behind America's Fifty-Year Fall—and Those Fighting to Reverse It, a 2018 nonfiction book by Steven Brill

== Music ==
- "Tailspin" (song), written by Jimmy Dorsey and Frankie Trumbauer
- "Tailspin", a song by Moe from the 2007 album The Conch
- "Tailspin", a song by Vinnie Moore from the 2007 album To the Core

== Roller coasters ==
- Tail Spin (Dreamworld), an aviation-themed ride at Dreamworld, Gold Coast, Australia
- Tailspin, a roller coaster at DandiLion Park, Muskego, Wisconsin, U.S.

== Other uses ==
- Tailspin, a video game mechanic from the Tekken series

== See also ==
- TaleSpin, a Disney animated TV series first aired in 1990
  - TaleSpin (Sega video game), a platform game for the Sega Genesis and Game Gear
  - TaleSpin (Capcom video game), for the NES and Game Boy
- Tailspin Tommy, an air adventure comic strip
- Self-control
