= Topspinner (disambiguation) =

A topspinner is a type of delivery bowled by a cricketer bowling either wrist spin or finger spin.

Topspinner may also refer to:

- Top-spinner (traditional activity), one who spins a toy on its axis
- Topspinner (racquet sports), a shot in racquet sports that increases a player's consistency

== See also ==
- Topspin (disambiguation)
