= Bill Rank =

American jazz trombonist (1904–1979)

- Born: William C. Rank; June 8, 1904; Lafayette, Indiana, U.S.
- Died: May 20, 1979 (aged 74) Cincinnati, Ohio, U.S.
- Genres: Jazz
- Instrument: Trombone
- Formerly of: Bix Beiderbecke; Jean Goldkette

William C. Rank (June 8, 1904 – May 20, 1979) was an American jazz trombonist.

Rank was born in Lafayette, Indiana, United States, and initially worked in Indiana and Florida. In 1922, he played trombone in Tade's Singing Orchestra, which was led by violinist, Tade Dolen. Between 1923 and 1927, he played with Jean Goldkette's band in Detroit and often recorded with Bix Beiderbecke. After playing with Adrian Rollini in 1927 and a period as a freelance, Rank joined Paul Whiteman's band and stayed until 1938. He was then a studio musician in Hollywood into the early 1940s, when he moved to Cincinnati. There, he led a tenet for the rest of the 1940s.

He later changed to playing part-time while also working in insurance. His one album as a leader, a tribute to Beiderbecke, was recorded in 1973. He continued playing until a short time before his death, on May 20, 1979, in Cincinnati.

== Discography ==
=== As leader ===
- Bix's Gang Lives (Fat Cat's Jazz, 1973)

=== As sideman ===
With Bix Beiderbecke

- At the Jazz Band Ball (Okeh)
- Goose Pimples (Okeh)
- Jazz Me Blues (Okeh)
- Louisiana (Okeh)
- Margie (Okeh)
- Ol' Man River (Okeh)
- Rhythm King (Okeh)
- Royal Garden Blues (Okeh)
- Since My Best Gal Turned Me Down (Okeh)
- Somebody Stole My Gal (Okeh)
- Sorry (Okeh Records)
- Thou Swell (Okeh)
- Wa-Da-Da (Everybody's Doin' It Now) (Okeh)
