= Tailspin (song) =

Song by Paul Whiteman and His Orchestra featuring Frankie Trumbauer
- Released: 1934
- Genre: Jazz
- Songwriters: Jimmy Dorsey and Frankie Trumbauer

1935 Decca 78, 560B, by The Dorsey Brothers' Orchestra.

The Dorsey Brothers' Orchestra, Decca 78 as part of album No. 246, 4202B, 1942.

"Tailspin" is a 1934 song written by Jimmy Dorsey and Frankie Trumbauer. The song was released by Paul Whiteman and His Orchestra featuring Frankie Trumbauer in 1934 on Victor and by The Dorsey Brothers Orchestra in 1935 as a Decca single.

The Dorsey Brothers Orchestra recorded the song on February 6, 1935 in New York and released it as a 78 single in 1935 on Decca Records, 560B. The record was re-released in 1942 as Decca 4202B, Matrix # 39342. The song was published in 1934 by Robbins Music in New York.

== First recording ==
Frankie Trumbauer recorded the first version with Paul Whiteman and His Orchestra on April 17, 1934 in New York which was released as a Victor 78, 24668, Matrix # 82319, backed with "G Blues".

== Sources ==
- Red Hot Jazz website.
- Stockdale, Robert L. Jimmy Dorsey: A Study in Contrasts. (Studies in Jazz Series). Lanham, MD: The Scarecrow Press, Inc., 1999.
- Arnold, Jay, ed. Jimmy Dorsey Saxophone Method: A School of Rhythmic Saxophone Playing. Warner Bros Pubns, 1999.
- Sanford, Herb. Tommy and Jimmy: The Dorsey Years. (Introduction by Bing Crosby). DaCapo Press, 1980.
- Bockemuehl, Eugene. On the Road with the Jimmy Dorsey Aggravation, 1947-1949. Gray Castle Press, 1996.
- Metronome Magazine, March, 1942: Jimmy Dorsey cover. Metronome Editors. Vol. LVIII, No. 3.
- Down Beat Magazine, October 21, 1946: Jimmy Dorsey and Paul Whiteman cover.
