= Margie (song) =

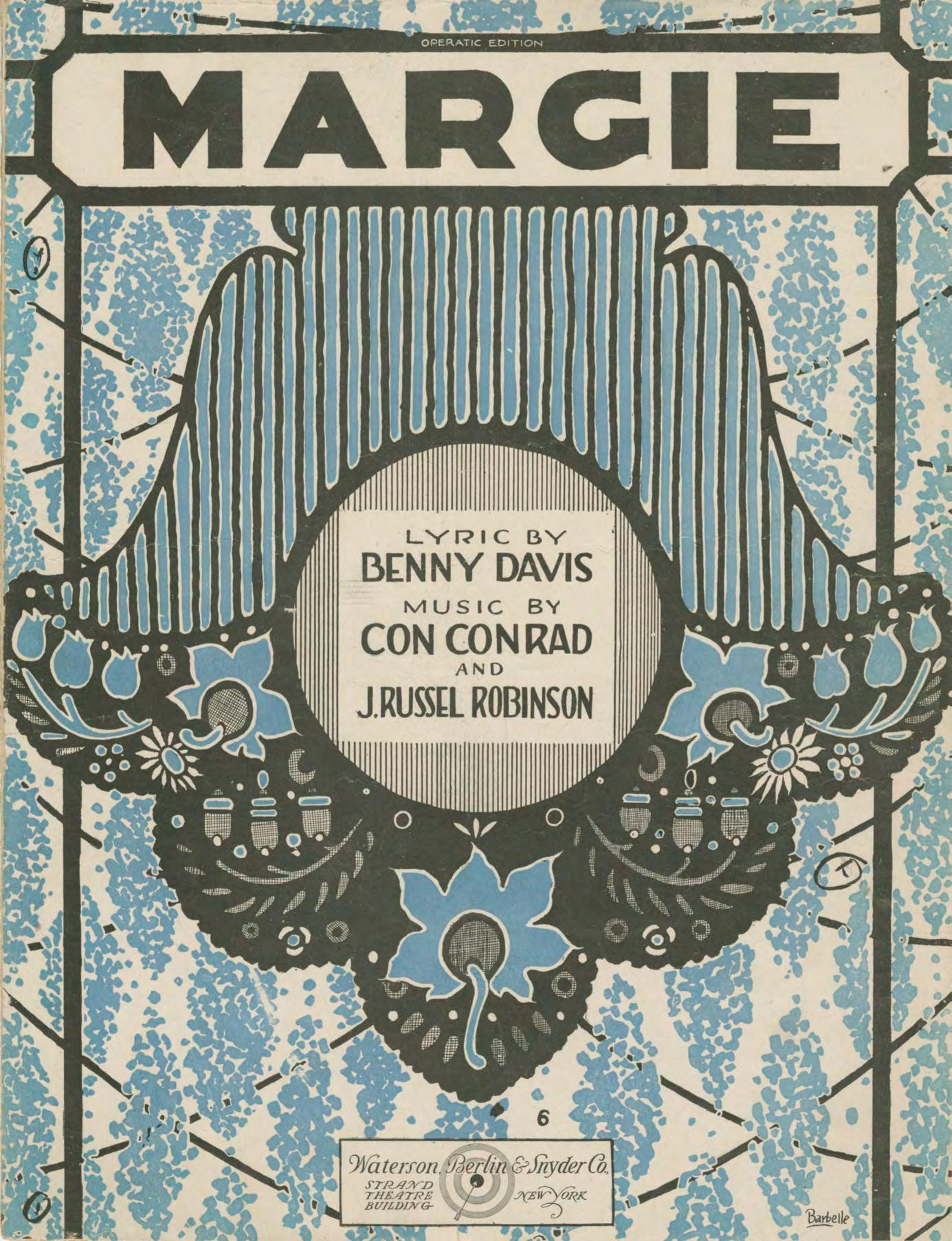
- Cover of the original Sheet music

Single by Original Dixieland Jazz Band
- B-side: "Palesteena"
- Published: by Waterson, Berlin & Snyder, Inc.
- Released: 1920
- Recorded: 1920
- Genre: Jazz
- Label: Victor
- Songwriters: Con Conrad, J. Russel Robinson, Benny Davis

Audio sample
- Original recording of "Margie", performed by Original Dixieland Jazz Band (1920): file; help

"Margie", also known as "My Little Margie", is a 1920 popular song composed in collaboration by vaudeville performer and pianist Con Conrad and jazz and ragtime pianist J. Russel Robinson, a member of the Original Dixieland Jazz Band. Lyrics were written by Benny Davis, a vaudeville performer and songwriter.

The song is a jazz and pop standard of the American songbook.

The song was introduced by the Original Dixieland Jazz Band in 1920 as Victor 78, 18717-A, in a medley paired with "Singin' the Blues". The B side was "Palesteena". The ODJB recorded their instrumental version on December 1, 1920.

Other popular versions in 1920-1921 were by Gene Rodemich; Eddie Cantor; Ted Lewis; and Frank Crumit. The Rega Dance Orchestra recorded the song in October, 1920 for Okeh Records, 4211.

The song was published in 1920 and was named after the five-year-old daughter of singer and songwriter Eddie Cantor. Cantor is credited with popularizing the song with his 1921 recording that stayed at the top of the pop charts for five weeks.

The song has appeared in the movies Stella Dallas (1937), Margie (1946), The Eddie Cantor Story (1953) and The Drowning Pool (1975). The song was also used in a Phonofilm sound-on-film cartoon produced by Max Fleischer and released 30 October 1926.

The song was the Preston North End unofficial club anthem during 1950s and played at Sir Tom Finney's funeral in 2014.

== Cover versions ==
1920 recording of "Margie" by Max Fells' Della Robbia Orchestra

1921 recording of "Margie" by Gene Rodemich's Orchestra.

Eddie Cantor performing "Margie" c. 1920.

Having been recorded by numerous artists, the song has become a jazz standard. Among the people who have recorded the tune are Ray Barretto, Bix Beiderbecke, Cab Calloway, Bing Crosby, Duke Ellington, Louis Armstrong, Johnny Mercer, Dave Brubeck, Ray Charles, Frank Crumit, Erroll Garner, Al Hirt, Claude Hopkins, Ted Lewis, Jimmie Lunceford, Jim Reeves, Shelly Manne, Oscar Peterson, Benny Goodman, André Ekyan (with Django Reinhardt), Don Redman, Fats Domino, Charlie Shavers, Jimmy Smith, Jo Stafford, Joe Venuti, Jorgen Ingmann, and Slim Whitman.

An instrumental version was recorded on March 21, 1962, for the LP There Is Nothing Like a Dame with Pete Candoli and Conte Candoli on trumpets, Shelly Manne on drums, Jimmy Rowles on piano, Howard Roberts on guitar and Gary Peacock on bass.

== Bibliography ==
- Shaw, Arnold: The Jazz Age: Popular Music in the 1920s. Oxford University Press US, 1989. ISBN 0-19-506082-2

== See also ==
- List of 1920s jazz standards
