= Jean Goldkette =

French-American jazz pianist and bandleader (1893–1962)

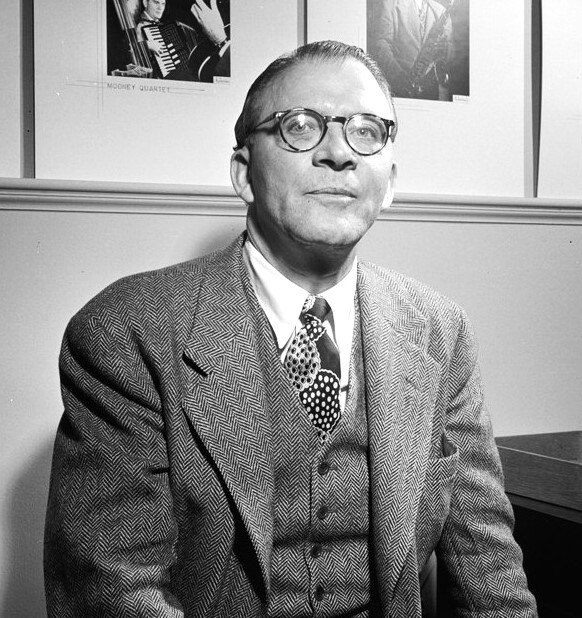
- Goldkette c. June 1947

Background information
- Born: John Jean Goldkette; March 18, 1893; Valenciennes, France (disputed)
- Died: March 24, 1962 (aged 69) Los Angeles, California, U.S.
- Genres: Jazz; Dixieland
- Occupations: Musician; bandleader
- Instrument: Piano
- Years active: 1912–1930s

John Jean Goldkette (March 18, 1893 – March 24, 1962) was a jazz pianist and bandleader.

He leased a ballroom in Detroit and formed a band which grew to success, and was the foundation for a business empire acting as an agency for twenty orchestras and owning many dance halls. In 1936, he filed for bankruptcy; however, over the next three decades, he built up business again as a musician, conductor, and promoter. He married Lee McQuillen, a newspaperwoman, on March 4, 1939.

== Early Life ==
Goldkette was born on March 18, 1893, in Valenciennes, France; however, there is some evidence that he may have actually been born in Patras, Greece. His mother, Angela Goldkette, was a circus performer from Denmark and travelled in Europe as a professional singer. Goldkette’s birth father died when he was a child. Subsequently, Angela remarried John Poliakoff, a Russian journalist.

As a child, he began training as a classical pianist in Greece and continued his studies in Russia where he attended the Moscow Conservatory. With the encouragement of relatives from Chicago, his family emigrated to the United States in 1911 when Goldkette was 12 years old. Fairing as a concert pianist received little positive reception, so he found his niche in the dance-band business, performing such pieces that coalesced with waltzes, polkas, schottisches, and foxtrots. While performing in a classical ensemble at the age of 18, his work came to the attention of orchestra leader Edgar Benson (aka “Mr. Big”) who held much success in Chicago, and Goldkette was hired as sub leader for his dance orchestras. He was such a smashing success that Benson relocated him to Detroit to head a subset of the Benson Orchestra.

During his time in Chicago, Goldkette drew inspiration from the music of Chicago’s south side. His exposure to ragtime arrangements came from Doc Cook’s eighteen man orchestra who performed nightly at the White City Amusement Park for local residents and visitors alike. Goldkette also heard the likes of King Oliver, Jasper Taylor, Jimmie Noone, and a variety of other musicians who captivated mass audiences. He would use these influences to adjust Benson’s work to draw in crowds.

Initially in Detroit, Goldkette received little recognition from the elite, but when he integrated ragtime into the pieces, audiences started to pour in. Wealthy clientele would even bring their children to listen to his performances, making Goldkette one of the go to places for jazz in Detroit.

The Book Hotel, later renamed to the Book-Cadillac Hotel, was looking for professional performers to match the hotel’s elegance and opulence. Hotel management turned to Benson to take the stage, but not wanting to leave Chicago, he suggested that they use Goldkette as their premier performer where he would soon see massive success and eventually even exceed the popularity of Benson himself.

== Career ==
From 1922-1923, a Chinese organization worked to build a large restaurant but for unknown reasons never finished full construction, putting the lot for sale. Through learning about this opportunity from friends in the banking industry, Goldkette was able to put enough funds together to be able to lease the property which would be soon named the Graystone Ballroom.

Having a physical space to perform gave him more power to gain more traction, allowing him to expand throughout the Midwest and become popular in other areas including his former city of residence Chicago, Buffalo, New Orleans, and even outside of the United States in Toronto.

While living in Europe, Goldkette knew the Horvath family whose string ensemble was considered one of the best on the continent. The Horvaths had then moved to Detroit where Goldkette reunited with Charles “Papa” Horvath while he was working in the Detroit Symphony Orchestra. He soon hired Charles to work side by side with him in addition to being the drummer for his orchestra, helping him to eventually co-own the Graystone Ballroom.

Goldkette officially started recording his orchestras under his own name in 1924 where he successfully formed the Goldkette Victor Orchestra with members such as Fuzzy Farrar, Red Nichols, Paul Van Loan, George Crozier, Don Murray, Joe Venuti, and Bill Kreutz. Some of their most notable hits included “Eileen”, “Honest and Truly”, “Remember”, and “What’s the Use of Dreaming?”

In 1926, Fud Livingston, Eddie Lang, Itzy Riskin, and Steve Brown joined Goldkette’s lineup, recording popular songs like “After I Say I’m Sorry”, “Dinah”, “Gimme a Little Kiss, Will Ya, Huh?”, and “Lonesome and Sorry.” Prominent musicians were also recruited as the group became more popular including Bix Beiderbecke, Frankie Trumbauer, and the Dorsey Brothers. Many of the arrangements were written by Russ Morgan with later compositions from 1926-1929 also by Morgan as well as Paul Mertz, Bill Challis, and Joe Glover.

The Victor Recording Orchestra (1924-1929) defeated Fletcher Henderson in a battle of the bands contest. The head arranger was Bill Challis and the musicians included Bix Beiderbecke, Steve Brown, Hoagy Carmichael, Jimmy Dorsey, Tommy Dorsey, Eddie Lang, Chauncey Morehouse, Don Murray, Bill Rank, and Spiegle Willcox. Rex Stewart, a member of Henderson's band, wrote that "It was, without any question, the greatest in the world ... the original predecessor to any large white dance orchestra that followed, up to Benny Goodman." Brian Rust also called it "the greatest band of them all".

Many musicians under the leadership of Goldkette grew to great stature. Joe Venuti became the greatest jazz violinist of the time, Eddie Lang became known as the father of jazz guitar, also being the inspiration for French guitarist Django Reinhardt. Don Murray became one of the premier clarinet players, and Steve Brown “brought the art of slapping the bass fiddle direct from New Orleans."

Goldkette was music director for the Detroit Athletic Club for over 20 years. He also owned his own entertainment company, Jean Goldkette's Orchestras and Attractions, working out of the Book-Cadillac Hotel in Detroit. He co-wrote the song "It's the Blues (No. 14 Blues)" which was recorded in Detroit and released by Victor. He also wrote the words to the 1926 song "New Steps".

In 1927, Paul Whiteman hired most of Goldkette's better players due to Goldkette's inability to meet payroll for his top-notch musicians.

Rex Stewart praised Goldkette’s orchestra even after many his musicians were hired away:

“No other white orchestra boasted such an array of skilled jazzmen at one time as did Jean Goldkette's. Not even Paul Whiteman (who hired many of Goldkette's former stars after the group disbanded) was able to bring about such swinging or such esprit de corps, principally because the freewheeling joy of playing with one another had vanished—this, even though Whiteman had the true sparkplugs of the Victor organization with him in Frankie Trumbauer and Bix Beiderbecke. But even they were seldom able to get the Whiteman aggregation off the ground.”

Goldkette helped organize McKinney's Cotton Pickers and Glen Gray's Orange Blossoms, which became popular as the Casa Loma Orchestra. In the 1930s, he left jazz to work as a booking agent and classical pianist. In 1939, he organized the American Symphony Orchestra which debuted at Carnegie Hall. Frankie Laine worked as Goldkette's librarian.

== Death ==
Goldkette moved to California in 1961 and the following year died in Santa Barbara, California, of a heart attack at the age of 69. He took a taxi to the hospital by himself and died that same day. He is buried in the Angelus-Rosedale Cemetery in Los Angeles, California.
