= J. Russel Robinson =

American pianist and composer (1892–1963)

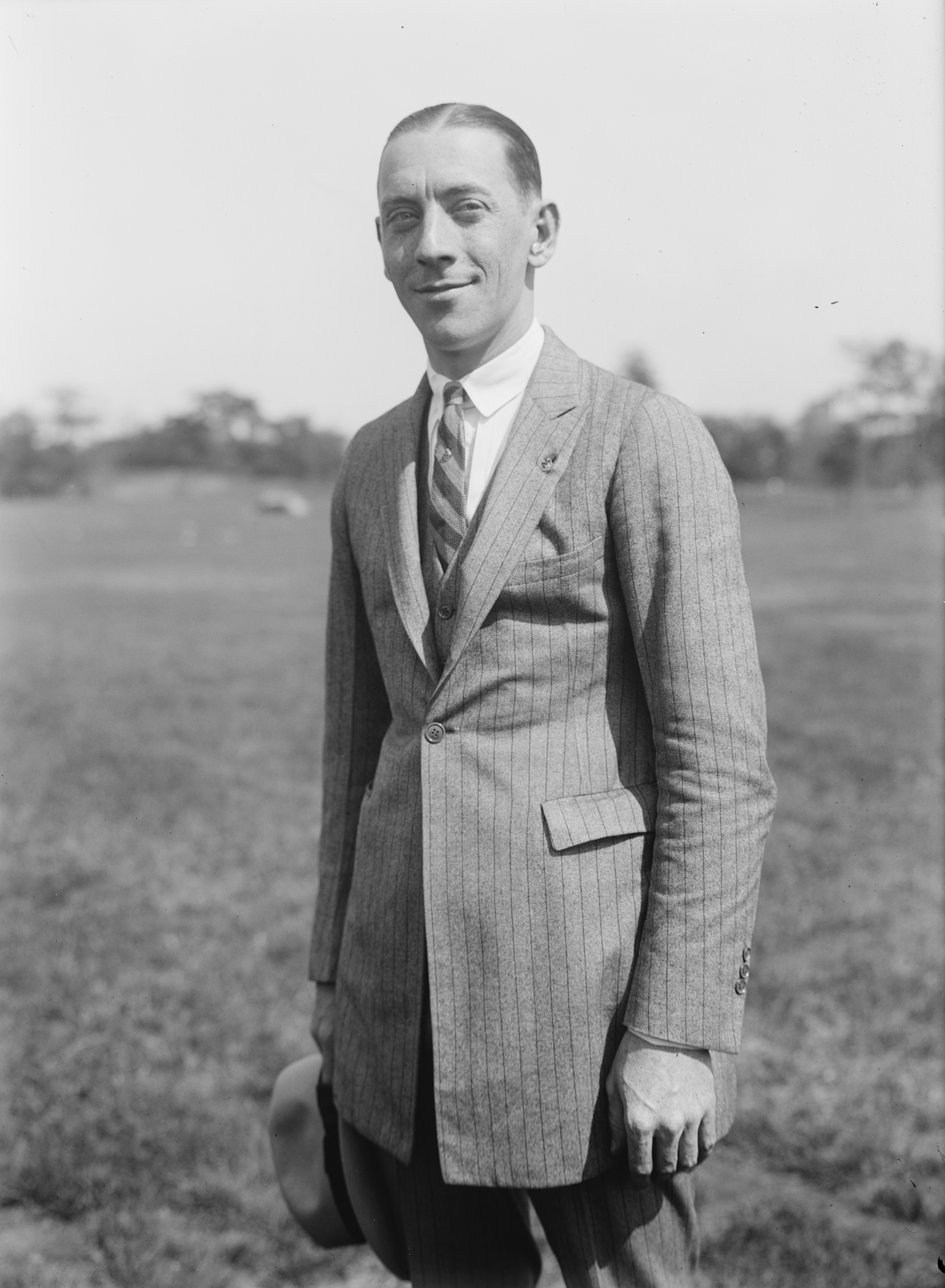
- J. Russel Robinson

Background information
- Born: Joseph Russel Robinson; July 8, 1892; Indianapolis, Indiana, U.S.
- Died: February 24, 1963 (aged 70) Palmdale, California
- Genres: Jazz; dixieland; ragtime; blues; traditional pop; classical
- Occupations: Musician, composer, lyricist
- Instrument: Piano
- Years active: 1908–1950
- Formerly of: Original Dixieland Jazz Band

Joseph Russel Robinson (July 8, 1892 – September 30, 1963) was an American jazz, ragtime, dixieland, and blues pianist and composer. He was a member of the Original Dixieland Jass Band.

He was the jazz composer who wrote the jazz and pop standard "Margie" and the Grammy Hall of Fame inductee "Singin' the Blues".

== Career ==
Robinson was born in Indianapolis, Indiana. In his teens he worked as a pianist in theaters to provide music for silent movies. With a right arm that was damaged by polio, he formed unusual techniques with his left hand. With his brother John, a drummer, he toured the southern United States in the early 1910s with an extended stay in New Orleans.

He started publishing compositions in his teens; his early hits included "Sapho Rag" and "Eccentric". His compositions were published as piano rolls by Imperial, the United Music Company, and QRS. He signed a contract with QRS to record blues songs from 1918 to 1921. He worked as a manager for the publishing company owned by W.C. Handy.

Robinson became a member of the Original Dixieland Jass Band in 1919, replacing on piano Henry Ragas, who died on February 18, 1919, in the flu epidemic. Aside from the band, in the early to middle 1920s he played piano for vocalists such as Lizzie Miles and Lucille Hegamin. In the 1930s he became the head of NBC Radio's music department and was a major factor in reuniting the now scattered band. The reunion in 1936 yielded six RCA Victor recordings as "The Original Dixieland Five," several network radio appearances (one with Benny Goodman), and an appearance in a "March of Time" movie short, with J. Russel Robinson speaking on-camera.

At the end of the decade Robinson moved to California and continued to write songs. He was the composer of the title song, "Portrait of Jennie," for the 1948 film of the same name. The song subsequently became a hit for Nat King Cole.

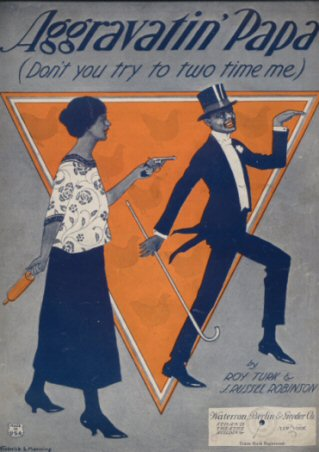
J. Russel Robinson/Roy Turk Aggravatin' Papa (Don't you try to two-time me), sheet music cover, 1922

== Compositions ==
Robinson's jazz compositions include "That Eccentric Rag", the jazz and pop standard "Margie", "A Portrait of Jennie", "Beale Street Mama", "Aggravatin' Papa", "Reefer Man", and the Grammy Hall of Fame inductee " Singin' the Blues". He sometimes used the alias Joe Hoover.

== Selected Discography ==
- Original Dixieland Jazz Band- Margie (1920), Victor
- Original Dixieland Jazz Band- Palesteena (1920), Victor
- Aileen Stanley- Singin' the Blues (1920), Victor
- Bessie Smith and the Down Home Trio- Aggravatin' Papa (1923), Victor
- Bessie Smith and the Down Home Trio- Beale Street Mamma (1923), Columbia
- Ted Weems Orchestra- Blue Eyed Sally (1924), Victor
- Ted Lewis Jazz Band- Eccentric (1924), Victor
- Joe Candullo and His Orchestra & Irving Kaufman- Go Wash an Elephant (If You Want to Do Something Big) (1927), Columbia
- Seger Ellis- Memories of France (1928), Columbia
- Claude Jones, Harlan Lattimore, & Connie's Inn Orchestra- Reefer Man (1932), Columbia
- Benny Goodman Orchestra- Margie (1938), Victor

== Awards and honors ==
"Singin' the Blues" was inducted into the Grammy Hall of Fame in a 1927 recording by Frankie Trumbauer and His Orchestra featuring Bix Beiderbecke on cornet.

== See also ==
- List of ragtime composers
