= Frankie Trumbauer =

American jazz saxophonist and bandleader (1901–1956)

Background information
- Also known as: Frankie, "Tram"
- Born: Orie Frank Trumbauer; May 30, 1901; Carbondale, Illinois, U.S.
- Origin: St. Louis, Missouri, U.S.
- Died: June 11, 1956 (aged 55) Kansas City, Missouri, U.S.
- Genres: Jazz, Dixieland
- Occupations: Musician, bandleader, composer
- Instruments: C-melody saxophone; alto saxophone; bassoon; clarinet

Orie Frank Trumbauer (May 30, 1901 – June 11, 1956) was an American jazz saxophonist of the 1920s and 1930s. His main instrument was the C melody saxophone, a now-uncommon instrument between an alto and tenor saxophone in size and pitch. He also played alto saxophone, bassoon, clarinet, and several other instruments.

He was a composer of sophisticated saxophone melodies and one of the major small group jazz bandleaders of the 1920s and 1930s. His landmark recording of "Singin' the Blues", with Bix Beiderbecke and Eddie Lang in 1927, was inducted into the Grammy Hall of Fame in 1977. His major recordings included "Krazy Kat", "Red Hot", "Plantation Moods", "Trumbology", "Tailspin", "Singin' the Blues", "Wringin' an' Twistin'", "For No Reason at All in C" with Beiderbecke and Lang, and the first hit recording of "Georgia on My Mind" in 1931.

Trumbauer was described as one of the most influential and important jazz saxophonists of the 1920s and 1930s, particularly influencing the sound of Lester Young. He is also remembered for his musical collaborations with Bix Beiderbecke, a relationship that produced some of the finest and most innovative jazz records of the late 1920s. Trumbauer and Beiderbecke also collaborated with jazz guitarist Eddie Lang.

He was featured in the 2001 documentary Jazz by Ken Burns on PBS on the topic of the first jazz soloists and as an iconic image to symbolize jazz music.

== Life and career ==
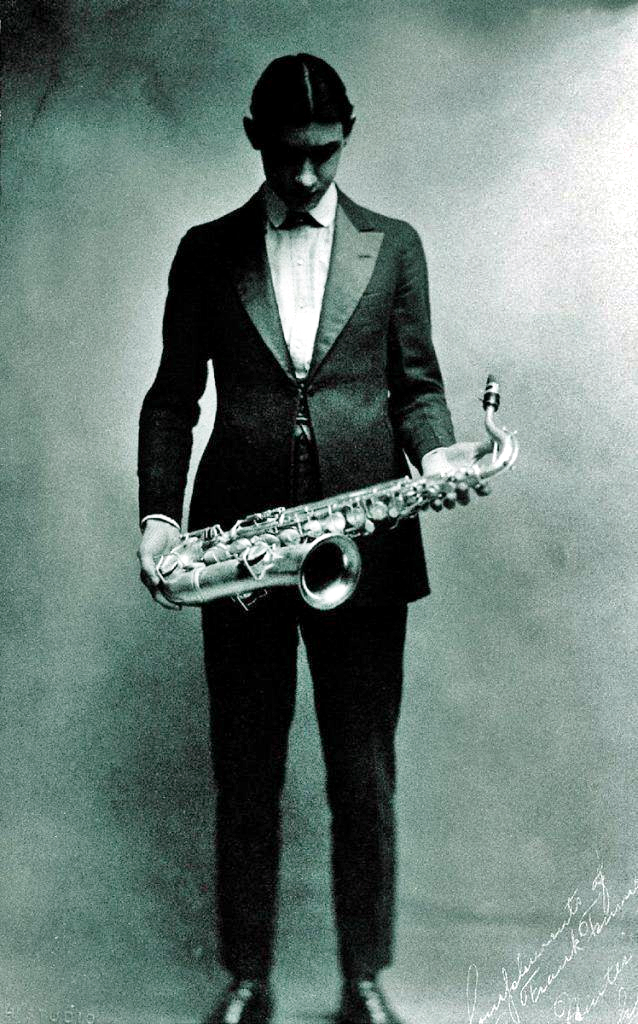
Photograph of Trumbauer featured in Ken Burns' Jazz

Born in Carbondale, Illinois, United States, Trumbauer grew up in St. Louis, Missouri, the son of a musical mother who directed saxophone and theater orchestras. The pianist Fred Bergin recalled him as "part Indian". His first important professional engagements were with the Edgar Benson and Ray Miller bands, shortly followed by the Mound City Blue Blowers, a local group that became nationally famous through their recordings on the Brunswick label.

Trumbauer recruited Bix Beiderbecke for Jean Goldkette's Victor Recording Orchestra, of which he became musical director. After leaving Goldkette, he and Beiderbecke worked briefly in Adrian Rollini's short-lived New Yorkers band, then joined Paul Whiteman in 1927. The same year, Trumbauer signed a contract with Okeh Records and released a 78 recording of "Singin' the Blues", featuring Beiderbecke on cornet and Eddie Lang on guitar. "Singin' the Blues" was a jazz classic originally recorded and released by the Original Dixieland Jass Band in 1920. The Okeh recording became a hit. Fletcher Henderson and His Orchestra recorded it in 1931 in the Trumbauer–Beiderbecke version.

Trumbauer played with Whiteman for eight of the following nine years. He had a separate contract with Okeh from 1927 through 1930 and recorded some of the small group jazz recordings of the era, usually including Beiderbecke until the April 30, 1929, session. He recorded a handful of sides in 1931 for Brunswick. In 1932, he organized a band in Chicago and recorded for Columbia, but gave up the orchestra and returned to New York late in 1933. During 1934–1936, while again a member of Paul Whiteman's Orchestra, he also made a series of recordings for Brunswick and Victor, often including Jack Teagarden.

In 1936, he led The Three T's, featuring the Teagarden brothers; in 1938, he and Mannie Klein started a band which they co-led; he billed himself as "Frank Trombar". In 1939, Trumbauer, a skilled pilot, left music (after recording a series of records for Varsity) to join the Civil Aeronautics Authority.

During World War II, he was a test pilot with North American Aviation and trained military crews in the operation of the B-25 Mitchell bomber. He continued to work for the CAA after the war, and also played in the NBC Orchestra. After 1947, although he continued to play and record, he earned most of his income in aviation.

== Last years and death ==
Trumbauer died of a heart attack in Kansas City, Missouri, where he had made his home for some years. He was 55 years old.

== Legacy ==
Lester Young cited Trumbauer as a major influence on his playing. In a 1956 interview with Nat Hentoff, Young recalled that "Trumbauer was my idol" and that he had "tried to get the sound of a C-melody on a tenor. That's why I don't sound like other people." Asked in a 1959 Paris interview with François Postif whether Trumbauer was his main influence, Young replied, "That was my man." According to saxophonist Eddie Barefield, Young first heard Trumbauer's playing in the winter of 1927–28, when Barefield played him the Okeh recording of "Singin' the Blues" in Bismarck, North Dakota. The two "used to get together and send off from a catalog and get all of Frankie Trumbauer's records", which Barefield credited as "the basis of his style".

Jazz historian Richard Sudhalter cautioned against reading this influence too literally, citing a 1982 master's thesis finding that "the improvising methods of the two players are in most ways disparate". He argued that what Young took from Trumbauer was "the stance, the emotional positioning, a way of viewing himself in an aesthetic looking-glass [...] the manner may be Trumbauer, but the phrasing is Beiderbecke."

His life and career were documented in the biography Tram: The Frank Trumbauer Story by Philip R. Evans and Larry F. Kiner with William Trumbauer (Institute of Jazz Studies, Rutgers and Scarecrow Press Inc., 1994).

He was featured in episode 3, "Our Language", in the 2001 documentary Jazz by Ken Burns on PBS on the topic of pioneering jazz soloists. A photograph of him holding his Holton C melody saxophone was one of the images chosen by Burns to symbolize jazz. The photo is featured on all the intros and outros as well as in episode 3. His 1927 solo on "Singin' the Blues" is analyzed as well.

He was known for the double tonguing articulation technique.

== Honors ==
"Singin' the Blues", released by Frankie Trumbauer and His Orchestra featuring Bix Beiderbecke on cornet and Eddie Lang on guitar in 1927 as Okeh 40772-B, was inducted into the Grammy Hall of Fame in 1977. Frankie Trumbauer played the C melody saxophone solos on the landmark jazz recording.

In 2005, his 1927 recording of "Singin' the Blues" with Beiderbecke and Lang was placed on the U.S. Library of Congress National Recording Registry.

In 2008, his recordings of "Ostrich Walk" and "There'll Come a Time" with Beiderbecke were included on the soundtrack to the Brad Pitt movie The Curious Case of Benjamin Button, which was nominated for 13 Academy Awards, based on the F. Scott Fitzgerald short story from Tales of the Jazz Age.

Ken Burns used a photograph of him in the 2001 documentary Jazz, on PBS, on the topic of pioneering jazz soloists and as an image to represent jazz music.

== Compositions ==
Trumbauer's compositions include:

- "Trumbology" (1927)
- "Plantation Moods" with David Rose
- "Red Hot", "Wringin' an' Twistin'" with Fats Waller
- "Barbed Wire Blues"
- "Troubled"
- "I Like That"
- "Bass Drum Dan"
- "Break it Down"
- "I'm Glad"
- "Choo Choo"
- "Sun Spots"
- "Krazy Kat" with Chauncey Morehouse
- "G Blues"
- "Tailspin" with Jimmy Dorsey
- "Crying All Day"
- "Loved One"
- "Apple Blossoms" with Joe Venuti, Lennie Hayton, and Eddie Lang
- "Three Blind Mice" with Chauncey Morehouse
- "The Mayor of Alabam'"
- "Runnin' Ragged"
- "For No Reason at All in C" with Bix Beiderbecke (1927), which was released as a single 78 on Okeh and subsequently reissued on Columbia and Parlophone.

== Major recordings ==
Okeh 78, 40772-B, "Singin' The Blues", with Bix Beiderbecke and Eddie Lang, early 1930s pressing.

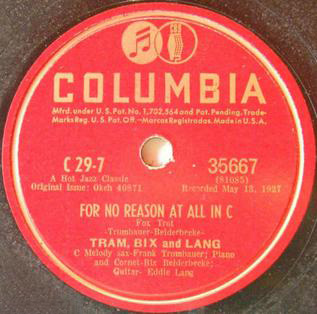
Columbia 78 reissue, 35667, "For No Reason at All in C", with Bix Beiderbecke and Eddie Lang.

- "I'm Glad"/"Flock O' Blues," Sioux City Six featuring Bix Beiderbecke and Miff Mole, recorded October 11, 1924, New York, released as Gennett 5569
- "Clarinet Marmalade"/"Singin' the Blues," recorded on February 4, 1927, in New York and released as Okeh 40772
- "Riverboat Shuffle"/"Ostrich Walk," recorded May 9, 1927, New York, Okeh 40822
- "I'm Coming, Virginia"/"Way Down Yonder in New Orleans", recorded on May 13, 1927, in New York and released as Okeh 40843
- "For No Reason at All in C"/"Trumbology," recorded on May 13, 1927, in New York and released as Okeh 40871, Columbia 35667, and Parlophone R 3419
- "Wringin' an' Twistin'," recorded on September 9, 1927, in New York and released as Okeh 40916 and Vocalion 3150
- "Krazy Kat" recorded September 28, 1927, New York Okeh 40903
- "Baltimore" b/w "Humpty Dumpty," recorded September 28, 1927, New York, Okeh 40926
- "Mississippi Mud" (vocal by Bing Crosby)/"There'll Come a Time (Wait and See)," January 9, 1928, New York, Okeh 40979
- "Ol' Man River" (From "Show Boat") recorded with Paul Whiteman and His Orchestra on January 11, 1928 in New York and released as Victor 21218-A and Victor 25249 with Bing Crosby on vocals and Bix Beiderbecke on cornet. No. 1 for 1 week
- "Borneo"/"My Pet," recorded on April 10, 1928, in New York and released as Okeh 41039
- "Georgia On My Mind," recorded September 24, 1931, Chicago, Illinois, Brunswick 6159
- "Troubled"/"Plantation Moods," recorded November 20, 1934, New York, Victor 24834, HMV B.D. 158 in the UK

== Sources ==
- Evans, Philip R. and Larry F. Kiner. Tram: The Frank Trumbauer Story. Studies in Jazz; No. 18. New Jersey: Institute of Jazz Studies - Metuchen. The Scarecrow Press, 1994.
- Kinkle, Roger D. The Complete Encyclopedia of Popular Music and Jazz 1900-1950. (Arlington House Publishers, 1974).
- Ward, Geoffrey C. and Ken Burns. Jazz: A History of America's Music. New York: Alfred A. Knopf, 2000.
