= Livery Stable Blues =

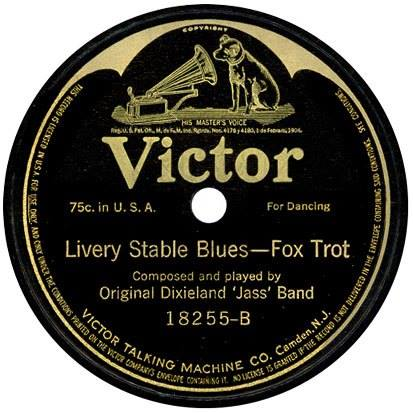
- First pressing of the Victor release of "Livery Stable Blues"; Performed by ODJB, 18255-B, 1917

Single by Original Dixieland Jass Band
- A-side: "Dixieland Jass Band One-Step"
- B-side: "Livery Stable Blues"
- Released: March 7, 1917
- Recorded: February 26, 1917
- Genre: Jazz
- Length: 3:10
- Label: Victor
- Songwriters: Ray Lopez (1889–1979); Alcide Nunez; Credited to Original Dixieland 'Jass' Band on the label

"Livery Stable Blues" is a jazz composition copyrighted by Ray Lopez (né Raymond Edward Lopez; 1889–1979) and Alcide Nunez in 1917. It was recorded by the Original Dixieland Jass Band on February 26, 1917, and, with the A side "Dixieland Jass Band One-Step" or "Dixie Jass Band One-Step" (a tune later better known as "Original Dixieland One-Step"), became widely acknowledged as the first jazz recording commercially released. It was recorded by the Victor Talking Machine Company in New York City at its studio at 46 West 38th Street on the 12th floor – the top floor.

== History ==
Livery Stable Blues
The Original Dixieland Jass Band's 1917 recording of "Livery Stable Blues."

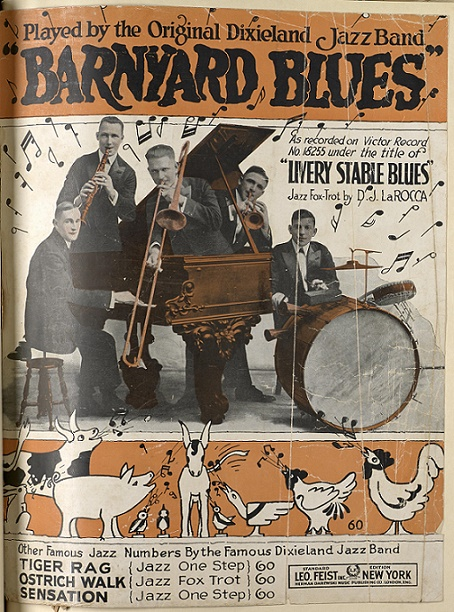
The sheet music cover for the ODJB version under the alternate title "Barnyard Blues", Leo Feist, Inc., New York, copyright 1917.

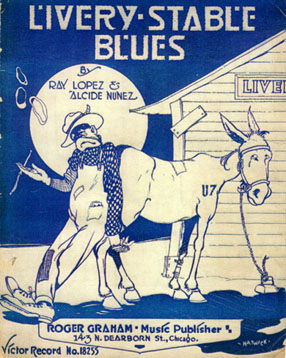
1917 Ray Lopez and Alcide Nunez version sheet music cover, artwork by Grim Natwick. Roger Graham Music Publisher, Chicago.

The Original Dixieland Jass Band was a group of white musicians from New Orleans. They had gained popularity playing at Schiller's Cafe in Chicago and Reisenweber's Restaurant in New York City, and became largely responsible for making the New Orleans style popular on a national level.

The ODJB made test recordings for Columbia on January 30, 1917, but no usable recordings resulted. On February 26 the ODJB recorded "Livery Stable Blues" for the Victor label. "Dixieland Jass Band One-Step" was recorded in the same session. Victor executives quickly released the record, which became an instant hit.

The success of this recording has been cited as possibly being the first popular music release to sell a million copies. However, the production-history cards for the record in Victor company files indicate that only some 250,983 copies were manufactured. The record established jazz as popular music and spawned demand for small jazz bands in New York and Chicago, at a time when it was getting harder and harder for musicians to find employment in New Orleans.

Both sides of the record were originally labeled as compositions by members of the band. However, two other New Orleans musicians, Nunez and Lopez, beat the ODJB in registering a copyright on the tune. Alcide Nunez had been clarinetist with the ODJB until a few months earlier. Trumpeter Ray Lopez had worked with most of the ODJB musicians in New Orleans, especially in the bands of Papa Jack Laine. The members of the ODJB published the piece copyrighted as their own composition under the alternative title "Barnyard Blues". The two parties and their respective publishers sued each other. The case resulted in the judge declaring neither party had copyright over the work, that it was based on a pre-existing melody, and declared it to be in the "public domain". The judge also expressed doubt that musicians unable to read or write music could be said to have "composed" anything.

Meanwhile, a second lawsuit arose from one of the strains of "Dixieland Jass Band One-Step" being almost identical to the 1909 Joe Jordan number "That Teasin' Rag". Later pressings of the record added Jordan as co-composer and he was awarded a share of the royalties. Later pressings of "Livery Stable Blues" omitted the phrase "Composed and played by" from the original pressings.

After Victor's release became a hit, Columbia had the group back to record again, and released their recording of "Home Again in Indiana" backed by "At the Darktown Strutters Ball". Columbia selected two Tin Pan Alley tunes of the day for the band to record, probably to avoid the copyright problems which surfaced over both sides of the band's supposed original compositions for Victor.

The Original Dixieland Jass Band published the sheet music for the composition under the alternate title of "Barnyard Blues" with Leo Feist in New York listing Nick LaRocca as the composer. The sheet music cover contained a reference to the Victor release of "Livery Stable Blues", 18255: "As recorded on Victor Record No. 18255 under the title of 'Livery Stable Blues'. Jazz Fox Trot by D.J. LaRocca." Alcide Nunez and Ray Lopez published sheet music with Roger A. Graham (1885–1938) in Chicago listing themselves as the composers. On their rival sheet music cover they refer to the same Victor release, Victor Record No. 18255. In a second issue of the sheet music, Marvin Lee added lyrics to the Nunez and Lopez version.

== Composition ==
Musically, "Livery Stable Blues" is a New Orleans style twelve-bar blues. It starts with a four-bar introduction, followed by three distinct themes played in succession, each repeated twice. The third theme consists of the trombone, clarinet and cornet imitating various barnyard animals: the clarinet a rooster, the cornet a horse, and the trombone a cow. The three themes are then repeated, and the tune ends with a one-bar tag. Lyrics were added to the instrumental by Marvin Lee.

== Personnel ==
- Nick LaRocca — cornet
- Eddie Edwards — trombone
- Larry Shields — clarinet
- Henry Ragas — piano
- Tony Spargo — drums

== Later recordings ==
W.C. Handy recorded one of the earliest cover versions of "Livery Stable Blues" on Columbia Records in New York on September 25, 1917, under the name Handy's Orchestra of Memphis, as A2419, with "That 'Jazz' Dance" as the flip side.

Paul Whiteman opened his landmark concert An Experiment in Modern Music in Aeolian Hall, New York City, on February 12, 1924, with the tune, to demonstrate the sound of early jazz bands. Jelly Roll Morton, the Emerson Military Band, the New Orleans Rhythm Kings, Fletcher Henderson, Benny Goodman, Glen Gray and the Casa Loma Orchestra, Bunny Berigan, Muggsy Spanier, Pete Daily and his Chicagoans, Phil Napoleon, The Belgrade Dixieland Orchestra, and Vince Giordano, on both the 2011 Grammy Award-winning soundtrack album to the HBO Boardwalk Empire series and the 2023 soundtrack to Martin Scorsese's Killers of the Flower Moon, have also recorded the song.
