= Jazz standard =

Composition that is an important part of the repertoires of jazz musicians

Jazz standards are musical compositions that are an important part of the musical repertoire of jazz musicians, in that they are widely known, performed, and recorded by jazz musicians, and widely known by listeners. There is no definitive list of jazz standards, and the list of songs deemed to be standards changes over time. Songs included in major fake book publications (lead sheet collections of popular tunes) and jazz reference works offer a rough guide to which songs are considered standards.

Not all jazz standards were written by jazz composers. Many are originally African-American spirituals, Tin Pan Alley popular songs, Broadway show tunes or songs from Hollywood musicals – the Great American Songbook. In Europe, jazz standards and "fake books" may even include some traditional folk songs (such as in Scandinavia) or pieces of a minority ethnic group's music (such as Romani music) that have been played with a jazz feel by well known jazz players. A commonly played song can only be considered a jazz standard if it is widely played among jazz musicians. The jazz standard repertoire has some overlap with blues and pop standards.

One of the most covered songs of all time, and possibly the most recorded standard composed by a jazz musician, is Duke Ellington's and Juan Tizol's "Caravan" with almost 1500 covers. Originally, the most recorded jazz standard was W. C. Handy's "St. Louis Blues" for more than 20 years from the 1930s onward, after which Hoagy Carmichael's "Stardust" replaced it. Following this, the place was held by "Body and Soul" by Johnny Green.

== Before 1920 ==
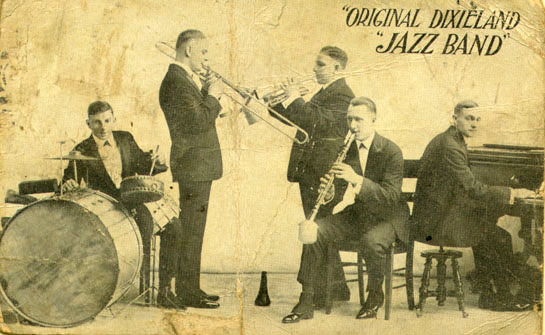
The Original Dixieland Jazz Band, from the original 1918 promotional postcard while the band was playing at Reisenweber's Cafe in New York City. Shown are (left to right) Tony Sbarbaro (a.k.a. Tony Spargo) on drums; Edwin "Daddy" Edwards on trombone; D. James "Nick" LaRocca on cornet; Larry Shields on clarinet, and Henry Ragas on piano.

From its conception at the change of the twentieth century, jazz was music intended for dancing. This influenced the choice of material played by early jazz groups: King Oliver's Creole Jazz Band, New Orleans Rhythm Kings and others included a large number of Tin Pan Alley popular songs in their repertoire, and record companies often used their power to dictate which songs were to be recorded by their artists. Certain songs were pushed by recording executives and therefore quickly achieved standard status; this started with the first jazz recordings in 1916, with That Funny Jas Band from Dixieland (1916) by Collins and Harlan for Thomas A. Edison, Inc. on Blue Amberol in December 1916 and in 1917, when the Original Dixieland Jass Band recorded "Darktown Strutters' Ball" and "Indiana". The first record with "Jass" on the label, The Original Dixieland One-Step was issue 18255 by Victor Talking Machine Company in 1917. Originally simply called "jazz", the music of early jazz bands is today often referred to as "Dixieland" or "New Orleans jazz", to distinguish it from more recent subgenres.

The origins of jazz are in the musical traditions of early twentieth-century New Orleans, including brass band music, the blues, ragtime and spirituals, and some of the most popular early standards come from these influences. Ragtime songs "Twelfth Street Rag" and "Tiger Rag" have become popular numbers for jazz artists, as have blues tunes "St. Louis Blues" and "St. James Infirmary". Tin Pan Alley songwriters contributed several songs to the jazz standard repertoire, including "Indiana" and "After You've Gone". Others, such as "Some of These Days" and "Darktown Strutters' Ball", were introduced by vaudeville performers. The most often recorded standards of this period are W. C. Handy's "St. Louis Blues", Turner Layton and Henry Creamer's "After You've Gone" and James Hanley and Ballard MacDonald's "Indiana".

== 1920s ==
A period known as the "Jazz Age" started in the United States in the 1920s. Jazz had become popular music in the country, although older generations considered the music immoral and threatening to old cultural values. Dances such as the Charleston and the Black Bottom were very popular during the period, and jazz bands typically consisted of seven to twelve musicians. Important orchestras in New York were led by Fletcher Henderson, Paul Whiteman and Duke Ellington. Many New Orleans jazzmen had moved to Chicago during the late 1910s in search of employment; among others, the New Orleans Rhythm Kings, King Oliver's Creole Jazz Band and Jelly Roll Morton recorded in the city. However, Chicago's importance as a center of jazz music started to diminish toward the end of the 1920s in favor of New York.

In the early years of jazz, record companies were often eager to decide what songs were to be recorded by their artists. Popular numbers in the 1920s were pop hits such as "Sweet Georgia Brown", "Dinah" and "Bye Bye Blackbird". The first jazz artist to be given some liberty in choosing his material was Louis Armstrong, whose band helped popularize many of the early standards in the 1920s and 1930s.

Some compositions written by jazz artists have endured as standards, including Fats Waller's "Honeysuckle Rose" and "Ain't Misbehavin'". The most recorded 1920s standard is Hoagy Carmichael and Mitchell Parish's "Stardust". Several songs written by Broadway composers in the 1920s have become standards, such as George and Ira Gershwin's "The Man I Love" (1924), Irving Berlin's "Blue Skies" (1927) and Cole Porter's "What Is This Thing Called Love?" (1929). However, it was not until the 1930s that musicians became comfortable with the harmonic and melodic sophistication of Broadway tunes and started including them regularly in their repertoire.

== 1930s ==
Broadway theatre contributed some of the most popular standards of the 1930s, including George and Ira Gershwin's "Summertime" (1935), Richard Rodgers and Lorenz Hart's "My Funny Valentine" (1937) and Jerome Kern and Oscar Hammerstein II's "All the Things You Are" (1939). These songs still rank among the most recorded standards of all time. The most popular 1930s standard, Johnny Green's "Body and Soul", was introduced in Broadway and became a huge hit after Coleman Hawkins's 1939 recording.

1930s saw the rise of swing jazz as a dominant form in American music. Duke Ellington and his band members composed numerous swing era hits that have later become standards: "It Don't Mean a Thing (If It Ain't Got That Swing)" (1932), "Sophisticated Lady" (1933) and "Caravan" (1936), among others. Other influential band leaders of this period were Benny Goodman and Count Basie.

== 1940s ==
The swing era lasted until the mid-1940s, and produced popular tunes such as Duke Ellington's "Cotton Tail" (1940) and Billy Strayhorn's "Take the 'A' Train" (1941). With the big bands struggling to keep going during World War II, a shift was happening in jazz in favor of smaller groups. Some swing era musicians, such as Louis Jordan, later found popularity in a new kind of music, called "rhythm and blues", that would evolve into rock and roll in the 1950s.

Bebop emerged in the early 1940s, with Charlie Parker, Dizzy Gillespie and Thelonious Monk leading the way. It appealed to a more specialized audiences than earlier forms of jazz, with sophisticated harmonies, fast tempos and often virtuoso musicianship. Bebop musicians often used 1930s standards, especially those from Broadway musicals, as part of their repertoire. Among standards written by bebop musicians are Gillespie's "Salt Peanuts" (1941) and "A Night in Tunisia" (1942), Parker's "Anthropology" (1946), "Yardbird Suite" (1946) and "Scrapple from the Apple" (1947), and Monk's "'Round Midnight" (1944), which is currently one of the most recorded jazz standards composed by a jazz musician.

== 1950s and later ==
Modal jazz recordings, such as Miles Davis's Kind of Blue (1959), became popular in the late 1950s. Popular jazz standards include Miles Davis's "Round About Midnight" (1959), John Coltrane's "My Favorite Things" (1961) and Herbie Hancock's "Watermelon Man" and "Cantaloupe Island".

In Brazil, a new style of music called bossa nova evolved in the late 1950s. Based on the Brazilian samba as well as jazz, bossa nova was championed by João Gilberto, Antonio Carlos Jobim and Luiz Bonfá. Gilberto and Stan Getz started a bossa nova craze in the United States with their 1963 album Getz/Gilberto. Among the genre's songs that are now considered standards are Bonfá's "Manhã de Carnaval" (1959), Marcos Valle's "Summer Samba" (1966), and numerous Jobim's songs, including "Desafinado" (1959), "The Girl from Ipanema" (1962) and "Corcovado" (1962).

The jazz fusion movement fused jazz with other musical styles such as rock and classical music. Its golden age was the 1970s. Famous fusion artists, such as Weather Report, Chick Corea and Return to Forever, Herbie Hancock and The Headhunters, The Manhattan Transfer, and the Mahavishnu Orchestra, achieved cross-over popularity, although public interest in the genre faded at the turn of the 1980s. Fusion's hits were Eumir Deodato's "Also Sprach Zarathustra (2001)" (1973), and Bob James's "Night on Bald Mountain" (1974), and Herbie Hancock's "Chameleon" (1973). Weather Report and The Manhattan Transfer covered Joe Zawinul's jazz standard "Birdland". Linda Ronstadt's What's New, Chaka Khan's Echoes of an Era, and Carly Simon's Torch were '80s jazz standard albums.

== See also ==
- List of jazz standards
