= Ostrich Walk =

1917 song performed by Original Dixieland Jass Band

1917 Aeolian Vocalion release as 1206.

1918 Victor release as 18457-B.

"Ostrich Walk" is a 1917 jazz composition by the Original Dixieland Jass Band released as an instrumental as an Aeolian Vocalion and a Victor 78. Frankie Trumbauer and Bix Beiderbecke recorded the song in 1927. The song is a jazz milestone as one of the first commercially released "jass" or jazz recordings.

== Background ==
The ODJB first released the song as an Aeolian Vocalion 78 single in 1917 as A1206 backed with "Tiger Rag". The song was released in 1918 as a Victor 78 paired with "At the Jazz Band Ball" as 18457-B on the Victor Talking Machine Company of Camden, New Jersey. The Victor recording was made on March 19, 1918, in New York. The personnel on the recording were Nick LaRocca, trumpet, Larry Shields, clarinet, Eddie Edwards, trombone, Henry Ragas, piano, and Tony Sbarbaro, drums.

The songwriting credits were listed as Nick LaRocca and Larry Shields.

A new version of the song was recorded on May 12, 1919, in London, England on Columbia by the ODJB and released as 736.

A new version of "Ostrich Walk" was recorded on September 25, 1936, by Nick LaRocca and The Original Dixieland Band Featuring Larry Shields on clarinet in New York and released as Victor 25460-A backed with "Toddlin' Blues".

Eddie Edwards and His Original Dixieland Jazz Band recorded the "Ostrich Walk" on April 6, 1946, and released it as Commodore 612 in 1946.

== Frank Trumbauer and Bix Beiderbecke Recording ==
Frankie Trumbauer and his Orchestra featuring Bix Beiderbecke recorded "Ostrich Walk" for Okeh Records in 1927 and released the song as a 78 single as 40822. The personnel on the May 9, 1927 recording session were: Bix Beiderbecke (cornet), Bill Rank (trombone), Don Murray (cl, bar), Ernest 'Red' Ingle (alto saxophone), Frankie Trumbauer (Cm), Itzy Riskin (p), Eddie Lang (banjo, guitar), and Chauncey Morehouse (drums). This version was featured on the soundtrack to the 2008 film The Curious Case of Benjamin Button.

== Other Recordings ==
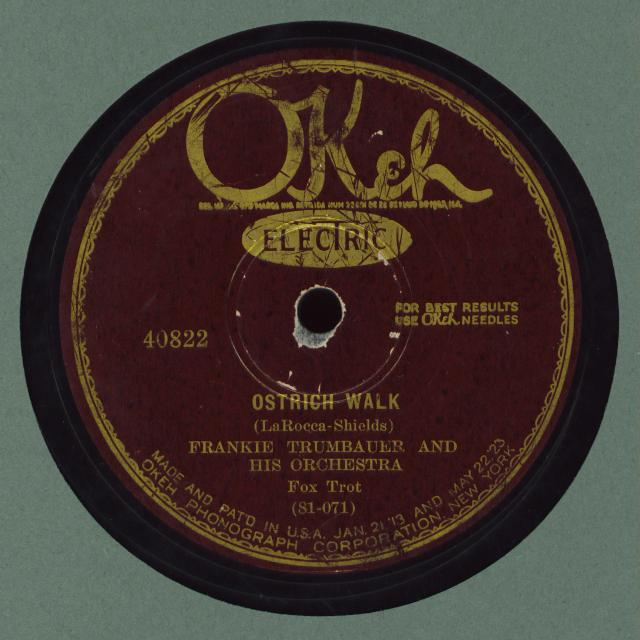
Frankie Trumbauer and Bix Beiderbecke recording on Okeh, 1927.

The song was also recorded by the Nick LaRocca and The Original Dixieland Band with "Toddlin' Blues" as Victor 25460-A featuring Larry Shields on clarinet in 1936, the New Orleans Rhythm Kings in 1934 on Decca Records as 229A and on Brunswick Records as 80119, Guido Deiro as A2648 on Columbia Records, Preacher Rollo and & The Five Saints on Lion, Lu Watters and the Yerba Buena Jazz band on Melodisc 1158, Watergate Seven Plus One, The Sons of Bix, and the Freddy Randall Band.

== Sources ==
- Gracyk, Tim, Frank Hoffmann, and B. Lee Cooper. Popular American Recording Pioneers, 1895–1925. Haworth Popular Culture Series. Routledge, 2000.
- Stewart, Jack. "The Original Dixieland Jazz Band's Place in the Development of Jazz." New Orleans International Music Colloquium, 2005.
- Lange, Horst H. Wie der Jazz begann: 1916–1923, von der "Original Dixieland Jazz Band" bis zu King Olivers "Creole Jazz Band". Berlin: Colloquium Verlag, 1991. ISBN 3-7678-0779-3
- Brunn, H.O. The Story of the Original Dixieland Jazz Band. Baton Rouge: Louisiana State University Press, 1960. Reprinted by Da Capo Press, 1977. ISBN 0-306-70892-2
