= Reisenweber's Cafe =

American restaurant

Coordinates: 40°46′02″N 73°58′58″W

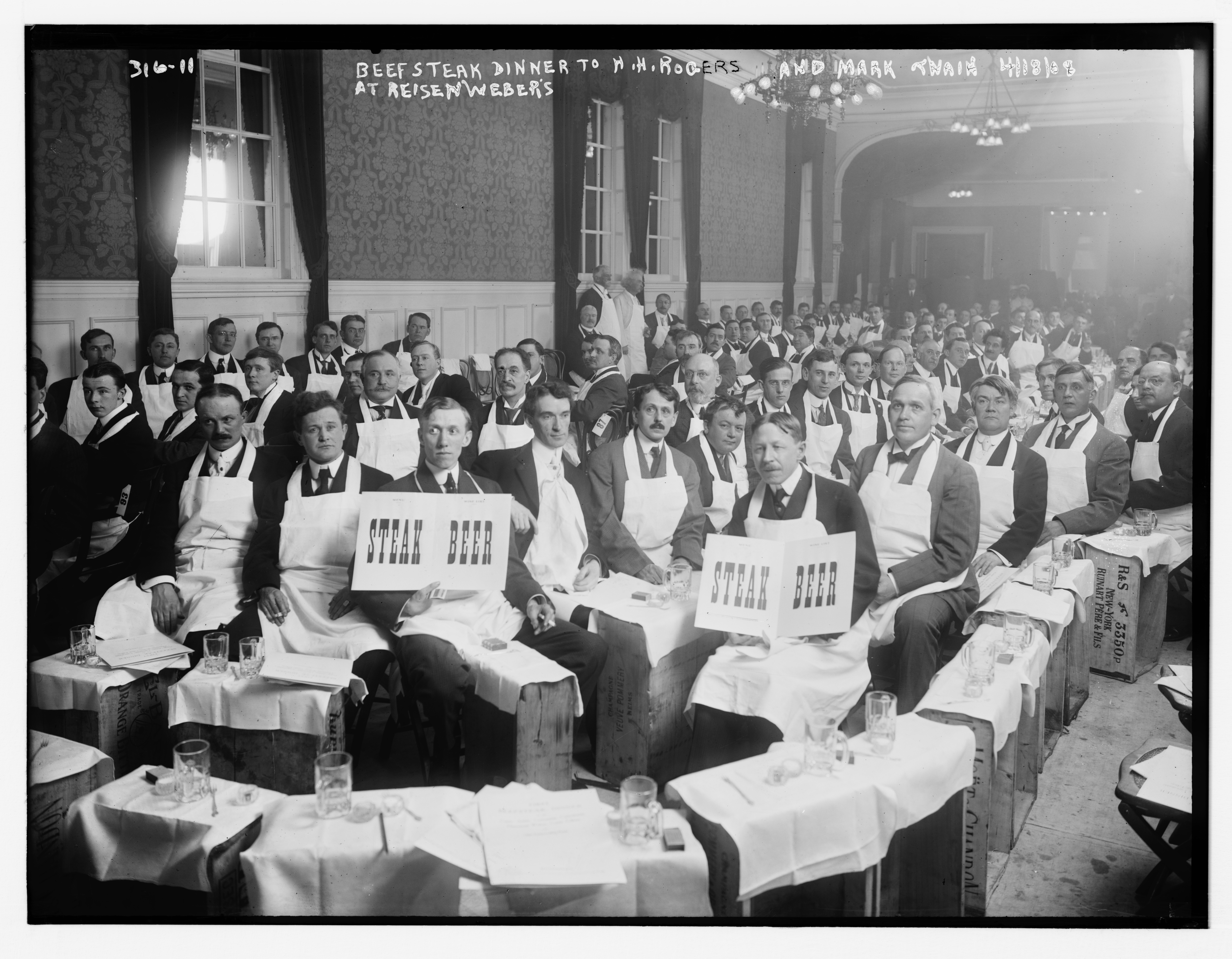
- Beefsteak dinner at Reisenweber's honoring H. H. Rogers and Mark Twain, 1908
- Interactive map of Reisenweber's Cafe
- Address: New York City

Construction
- Opened: 1856
- Closed: 1922

Reisenweber's Cafe, also known as Reisenweber's Restaurant or simply Reisenweber's, was a restaurant, nightclub, and hotel in Columbus Circle, Manhattan, on the intersection of Eighth Ave and 58th Street, from 1856/7 to 1922.

Reisenweber's Cafe was known for introducing and/or popularizing jazz, cabaret, and Hawaiian dance in New York City, the modern cover charge, and for its high-profile Volstead Act lawsuit and shutdown decree during Prohibition.

== History ==
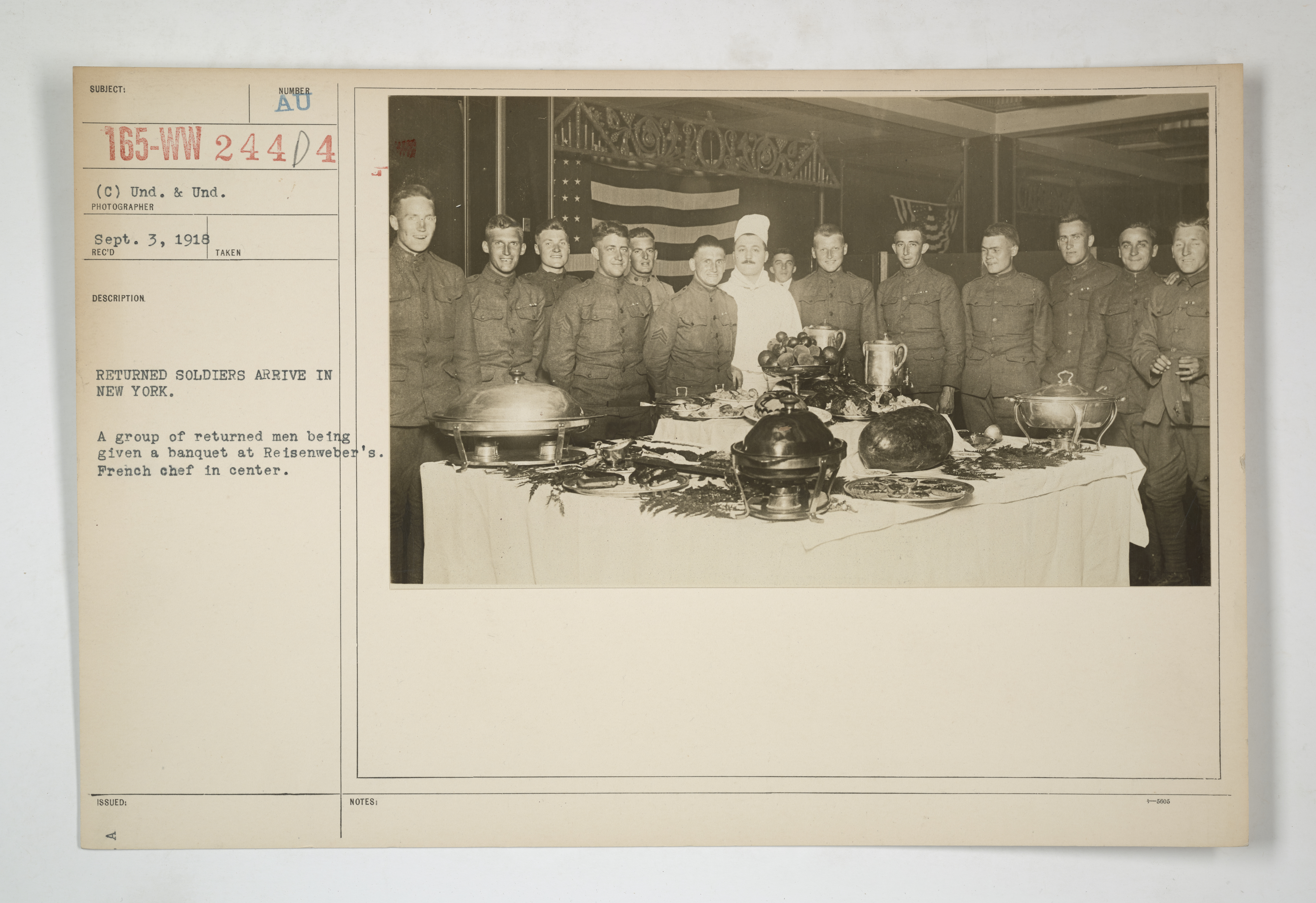
A banquet at Reisenweber's for a group of returning World War I soldiers, 1918

Reisenweber's started as a roadside tavern in 1856 or 1857, by John Reisenweber, a Brooklyn resident of German descent, at a time when the Columbus Circle area was still encircled by farmland.

The 1890s bicycle craze significantly increased demand for the tavern, and Reisenweber's began a process of expansion under John Reisenweber Jr. and his son-in-law Louis Fischer, who was named restaurant manager in 1901. The restaurant was further substantially expanded in 1910 and 1916, eventually becoming a seven-floor complex of two buildings, with four stories used for dining and entertainment, including a first-floor restaurant, a second-floor cabaret (the "400 Club"), a third-floor dance floor (the "Paradise Supper Club"), a "Hawaiian Room" on the fourth floor, and a rooftop garden for patrons. The Paradise Club, built in 1916, was designed by Joseph Urban and cost $250,000 to construct (about $6 million in 2020 dollars). The hotel within the complex had 50 rooms as of 1905.

At its height, Reisenweber's covered nearly an entire city block and “housed a dozen dining rooms, employed more than 1,000 in help and seated 5,000 diners at one time", making it one of the largest restaurants in the city.

In 1917, Reisenweber's celebrated its 60th anniversary with an entertainment program broadcast by "wireless telephone", a novelty at the time. That year, the establishment was grossing $3,600 per day (about $85,000 per day in 2020 dollars).

=== Notable patrons ===
The Pleiades Club would occasionally meet at Reisenweber's.

The 1917 campaign to elect John F. Hylan mayor of New York City was first hatched at the Beefsteak Room of Reisenweber's first-floor restaurant, a popular gathering spot for the city's political scene.

The wealthy wholesaler Sam Balcom was referred to as a "big butter-and-egg man" at Reisenweber's in reference to his lavish spending habits, which included inviting the entire chorus of popular musicals to the Reisenweber's cabaret, all expenses paid. This was likely the origin of the Prohibition-era slang phrase "butter-and-egg man" that was later incorporated into the 1925 play The Butter and Egg Man and the jazz standard "Big Butter and Egg Man."

=== Entertainment ===
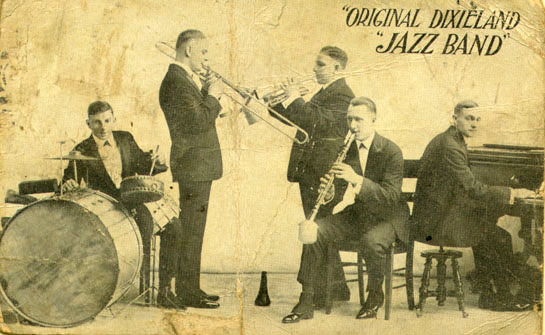
The Original Dixieland Jazz Band, from the original 1918 promotional postcard while the band was playing at Reisenweber's Cafe. Shown are (left to right) Tony Sbarbaro (aka Tony Spargo) on drums; Edwin "Daddy" Edwards on trombone; D. James "Nick" LaRocca on cornet; Larry Shields on clarinet, and Henry Ragas on piano.

In 1912, Reisenweber's became the first restaurant in New York City to provide its patrons with space to dance, initially with tea dances at the Crystal Room and later with dancing at the lavish third-floor Paradise Supper Club.

In 1913, Reisenweber's manager Louis Fischer introduced the first modern cover charge, to cover the production costs of Ned Wayburn's revues.

The Hawaiian Room on the fourth floor was opened for Doraldina's Hawaiian dance routine, precipitating the city's 1916 "Hawaiian craze".

Sophie Tucker was a star performer at the second-floor 400 Club starting in 1918. Her "Bohemian Nights" performances helped popularize the modern cabaret style, and were so successful that the 400 Club was renamed the "Sophie Tucker Room" in 1919.

==== "Jass" at Reisenweber's ====
In January 1917, the Original Dixieland Jass Band began an engagement playing for dancers at the second-floor 400 Club of Reisenweber's Cafe, an engagement that introduced jazz to a wider audience. In the words of jazz historian Joachim Berendt in his 1975 The Jazz Book:

In 1917, the ODJB (Original Dixieland Jass Band) played at Reisenweber's Restaurant on Columbus Circle in New York and made a tremendous hit. From that time on, the word 'Jazz' - first usually spelled 'Jass' - became known to the general public.

Among the audience at the band's first week of performances were representatives from Victor Talking Machine Company, who signed a recording contract with the band. The Original Dixieland Jass Band recorded "Livery Stable Blues" and "Dixieland Jass Band One-Step", on February 26, 1917, at Victor's New York studios, and the titles were released as Victor 18255 in May 1917, the first issued jazz record.

The Original Dixieland Jass band would go on to record 25 singles between 1917 and 1923, including the 1917 "Reisenweber Rag" (Aeolian-Vocalion 1242).

In 1918, Bert Kelly brought his "Jass Band", including Joe "Ragbaby" Stephens, Alcide Nunez, and Tom Brown, to New York City to fill in for the Original Dixieland Jass Band at Reisenweber's Cafe, while the latter was away on tour. After the Original Dixieland Jass Band returned to New York, the two continued to alternate at Reisenweber's. After the Kelly Band won greater approval from the crowds at a "Battle of the Bands" competition, Stephens, the drummer, found his drum heads slashed, after which he took the next train back to Chicago and never again headed east.

=== Decline and closure ===
The passage of the Volstead Act and start of national prohibition caused a decline in business, and manager Louis Fischer liquidated Reisenweber's Cafe in 1920 to pay off a $100,000 debt. In December 1921, Fischer sold his controlling interest in Reisenweber's to a syndicate run by John Wagener, Walter Kaffenberg, and B. H. Uberall, who announced that they would change the name of the business in the course of their reorganization.

By 1922, Reisenweber's was operating in part as a speakeasy, serving private stocks of liquor at invitation-only events. On New Year's Day, 1922, prohibition agents raided a private party at the restaurant and served summonses to the manager, John Gorman, and his son for serving liquor to a half dozen diners. The prohibition agents alleged that "a telephone bell linked with all the dining rooms was to have been rung a certain number of times when [prohibition officers] appeared".

In March 1922, federal authorities sued to close Reisenweber's on the accusation that liquor was served on its premises, marking the first time that the injunction clause of the Volstead Act had been invoked in the Southern District of New York.

On September 28, 1922, federal judge Martin T. Manton decreed the closing of Reisenweber's Cafe for a year, a decision that was upheld on appeal the following January. Reisenweber's never reopened.

By November 1923, the Paradise Gardens "dancing palace" was operating out of the former Reisenweber's Cafe. The Reisenweber's buildings housed a Woolworth store in the 1940s, and were finally demolished in the 1980s.

== Reisenweber's Brighton Beach Casino and Shelbourne Hotel ==
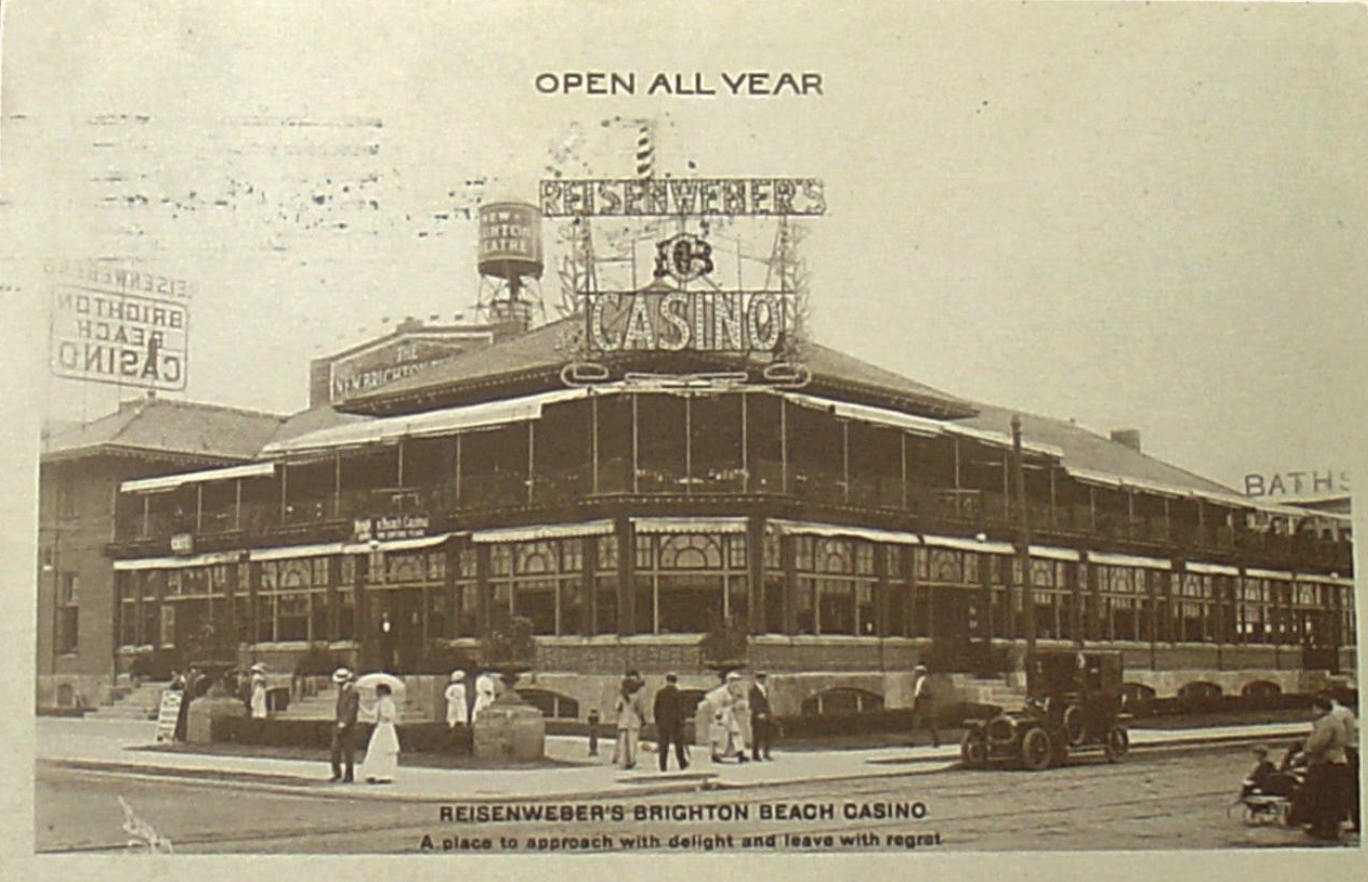
Postcard of Reisenweber's Brighton Beach Casino, 1910

Starting in 1909, a second branch of Reisenweber's, Reisenweber's Brighton Beach Casino, operated in Brighton Beach, at Ocean Parkway and Surf Avenue, next door to the New Brighton Theater.

The casino was built around 1907, in the lot that formerly belonged to Bader's Hotel. Its edifice was made of ornamental Spanish tile and brick, and its elaborate bar cost $42,000 to build (about $1,100,000 in 2020 dollars). Its top floor deck resembled the deck of an ocean liner, overlooking the beach and ocean, and an advertisement promised "All the Joys of a Sail, Without the Motion!". Dances were held in the Wisteria Ballroom.

Reisenweber's Brighton Beach Casino featured performances by Lillian Russell and Eddie Cantor. The popular 1914 song "By the Beautiful Sea" was written on its terrace, during a party held by Russell and Diamond Jim Brady, who had a private dining room at the casino.

John Reisenweber, Jr., later purchased the Ricca Donna Hotel on the other side of New Brighton Theater, renamed it the Shelbourne Hotel, and ran it as a sister entertainment venue to the Brighton Beach Casino. Both establishments were managed by Victor Herz, who would later become controller of the Trommer Brewery. Herz introduced the modern floor show to Brooklyn audiences, and the entertainers who performed at the Shelbourne included Sophie Tucker, George Jessel, Lila Lee, Ben Bernie, and Harry Richman.

The Casino closed during prohibition and was replaced by a bathhouse, Publix Baths, and, in the early 1950s, a bingo parlor and event hall, Club 28. The building was demolished after a 1980 fire, likely caused by arson, and was replaced by a high-rise apartment building.
