= Magic in the Moonlight =

2014 film by Woody Allen

- Theatrical release poster
- Directed by: Woody Allen
- Written by: Woody Allen
- Produced by: Letty Aronson; Stephen Tenenbaum; Edward Walson
- Starring: Eileen Atkins; Colin Firth; Marcia Gay Harden; Hamish Linklater; Simon McBurney; Emma Stone; Jacki Weaver
- Cinematography: Darius Khondji
- Edited by: Alisa Lepselter
- Production companies: Dippermouth; Gravier Productions; Perdido Productions; Ske-Dat-De-Dat Productions
- Distributed by: Sony Pictures Classics (United States); Mars Distribution (France)
- Release dates: July 25, 2014 (United States); October 22, 2014 (France)
- Running time: 98 minutes
- Countries: United States; France
- Language: English
- Budget: €13.5 million ($16.8 million)
- Box office: $51 million

Magic in the Moonlight is a 2014 romantic comedy film written and directed by Woody Allen. The film stars Eileen Atkins, Colin Firth, Marcia Gay Harden, Hamish Linklater, Emma Stone, Simon McBurney, and Jacki Weaver. Set in the 1920s on the French Riviera, the film was released in the United States on July 25, 2014, by Sony Pictures Classics. Magic in the Moonlight received a mixed reception. Critics praised the performances of Firth and Stone, but found the film's writing formulaic.

== Plot ==
In 1928, an illusionist, Wei Ling Soo, performs in front of a crowd in Berlin with his world-class magic act. Soo is actually a British man named Stanley, who wears a disguise in his act. In his dressing room, he is greeted by old friend and fellow illusionist Howard Burkan. Howard enlists Stanley to accompany him to the French Riviera, where a rich American family, the Catledges, has apparently been taken in by a clairvoyant, Sophie, so much that the son of the family, Brice, is smitten with her. Howard says he has been unable to uncover the secrets behind Sophie's tricks, and is tempted to believe she really has supernatural powers. He asks Stanley, who has debunked many charlatan mystics, to help him prove she is a fraud.

Howard and Stanley travel to the French Riviera, but Stanley is soon astonished by Sophie's ability to go into a fugue state and apparently pull out highly personal details about him and his family. Stanley witnesses a séance in which Sophie communicates with the deceased patriarch of the Catledge family. A candle floats up from the table and Howard grabs it to try to discern what trickery is at play, but is astounded to find no apparent subterfuge.

When Stanley and Sophie visit his Aunt Vanessa in Provence, Sophie is seemingly able, upon holding Aunt Vanessa's pearls, to somehow relate secret details of Vanessa's great love affair. This finally convinces Stanley of Sophie's authenticity. He has an epiphany, realizing that his lifelong rationalism and cynicism have been misguided. When caught in a rainstorm, Stanley and Sophie take shelter at an observatory the former used to visit as a child. After the rain subsides, they open the roof up and view the stars.

At a Gatsby-esque party, Stanley and Sophie dance. As they walk together later that night, Sophie asks him if he has felt any feelings for her "as a woman". Stanley is surprised and admits he has not thought of her in that way. She leaves upset. The next day, Stanley holds a press conference to tell the world that he, who spent his life debunking charlatan mystics, has finally come to find one who is the real deal. The conference is interrupted when he receives news that Aunt Vanessa has been in a car accident.

Stanley rushes to the hospital, and considers turning to prayer for solace. He begins to pray for a miracle to save his aunt, but is unable to go through with it as the rationality that has been his whole life comes back. He rejects prayer, the supernatural and by extension, Sophie and her powers. He decides once more to prove she is a fraud.

Using a trick seen earlier in his stage act, Stanley appears to leave the room but stays to overhear Sophie and Howard discuss their collusion in what has been an elaborate ruse. He discovers Sophie was able to know so much about him and his aunt because she and Howard collaborated to fool Stanley. Sophie is indeed a charlatan, and Howard had found out. Rather than unmask her to stop the ruse, he enlisted Sophie to help him one-up Stanley.

Stanley is initially angry at Howard and Sophie, but decides to forgive them. In a conversation with Aunt Vanessa, who has recovered from her car accident, Stanley admits that he is in love with Sophie. He finds her and asks her to marry him instead of Brice. Sophie is taken aback and rejects his haughty, awkward proposal. Returning dejected to Aunt Vanessa's, Stanley admits that he fell in love with Sophie at first sight. He is then surprised when Sophie, who had arrived before him, uses a spirit knock. He proposes, she accepts with a spirit knock, and they kiss.

== Cast ==
- Colin Firth as Stanley Crawford
- Emma Stone as Sophie Baker
- Eileen Atkins as Aunt Vanessa
- Marcia Gay Harden as Mrs. Baker
- Hamish Linklater as Brice Catledge
- Simon McBurney as Howard Burkan
- Jacki Weaver as Grace Catledge
- Erica Leerhsen as Caroline
- Catherine McCormack as Olivia
- Jeremy Shamos as George
- Lionel Abelanski as doctor

== Production ==
In April 2013, Colin Firth and Emma Stone joined the cast of the film. In July, they were joined by Jacki Weaver, Marcia Gay Harden, and Hamish Linklater. Principal photography took place over six and a half weeks in July and August 2013 in Southern France. Filming locations included the Opéra de Nice (the exterior of the Berlin theater where Stanley performs as Wei Ling Soo), Studios Riviera in Nice (the interior and the backstage area of the Berlin theater), the Hotel Negresco bar in Nice (the Berlin cabaret), the Villa Eilenroc in Antibes (the Catledge estate and the ball scene), the Villa La Renardière in Mouans-Sartoux (the Catledge estate), the Château du Rouët in Le Muy (Aunt Vanessa's house), the Nice Observatory (where Stanley and Sophie take refuge from the rainstorm), and the bar and restaurant at the Hôtel Belles Rives in Juan-les-Pins. Allen revealed the film's title to be Magic in the Moonlight on October 15, 2013.

=== Music ===
Soundtrack

1. "You Do Something to Me" by Cole Porter, performed by Leo Reisman and His Orchestra
2. "It's All a Swindle" ("Alles Schwindel") by Mischa Spoliansky and Marcellus Schiffer, performed by Ute Lemper
3. "Moritat" from The Threepenny Opera by Kurt Weill and Bertolt Brecht, performed by Conal Fowkes
4. "Dancing with Tears in My Eyes" by Joseph A. Burke and Al Dubin, performed by Nat Shilkret and His Orchestra
5. "Big Boy" by Milton Ager and Jack Yellen, performed by Bix Beiderbecke
6. "Thou Swell" from A Connecticut Yankee by Richard Rodgers and Lorenz Hart, performed by Bix Beiderbecke
7. "Sorry" by Raymond Klages, performed by Bix Beiderbecke & His Gang
8. "The Sheik of Araby" by Harry B. Smith, Francis Wheeler and Ted Snyder, performed by Sidney De Paris and De Paris Brothers Orchestra
9. "Chinatown, My Chinatown" by William Jerome and Jean Schwartz, performed by the Firehouse Five Plus Two
10. "Remember Me" by Sonny Miller, performed by Al Bowlly
11. "Charleston" by James P. Johnson and R. C. McPherson, performed by Paul Whiteman & His Orchestra
12. "Sweet Georgia Brown" by Ben Bernie, Maceo Pinkard and Kenneth Casey, performed by The California Ramblers
13. "You Call It Madness (But I Call It Love)" by Con Conrad, Gladys DuBois, Russ Colombo and Paul Gregory, performed by Smith Ballew and His Piping Rock Orchestra
14. "At the Jazz Band Ball" by Larry Shields, Anthony S. Barbaro, D. James LaRocca and Edwin B. Edwards, performed by Bix Beiderbecke & His Gang
15. "It All Depends on You" by Ray Henderson, Lew Brown and B. G. DeSylva, performed by Ruth Etting
16. "I'll Get By (As Long as I Have You)" by Fred E. Ahlert and Roy Turk, performed by Conal Fowkes

Used in the film but not on the soundtrack are:

- "The Adoration of the Earth" from The Rite of Spring by Igor Stravinsky, performed by the London Festival Orchestra
- Boléro by Maurice Ravel, performed by the Royal Philharmonic Orchestra
- Molto vivace, second movement from Symphony No. 9 in D minor by Ludwig van Beethoven, performed by the Royal Philharmonic Orchestra
- "Thou Swell" from A Connecticut Yankee by Richard Rodgers and Lorenz Hart, performed by Cynthia Sayer and Hamish Linklater
- "I'm Always Chasing Rainbows" by Harry Carroll and Joseph McCarthy, performed by Cynthia Sayer and Hamish Linklater
- "Who?" from Sunny by Oscar Hammerstein II, Otto Harbach and Jerome Kern, performed by David O'Neal and Hamish Linklater

== Release ==
In October 2013, it was announced that FilmNation Entertainment would handle international sales for the film, while Sony Pictures Classics acquired North American distribution rights in January 2014. The film opened in theaters in New York City, Los Angeles, and Chicago on July 25, 2014, followed by a wide release in the United States on August 15. In France, Magic in the Moonlight was released theatrically on October 22, 2014, by Mars Distribution.

== Reception ==
=== Box office ===
Magic in the Moonlight grossed $10.5 million in the United States and Canada, and $40.5 million in other territories, for a worldwide total of $51 million.

The film opened in 25 theaters in the United States, grossing $412,095 in its opening weekend, with an average of $24,241 per theater. In its fourth weekend, it expanded to 964 theaters and grossed $1.8 million, with an average of $1,853 per theater.

=== Critical response ===
Magic in the Moonlight received mixed reviews from critics. On the review aggregator website Rotten Tomatoes, the film holds an approval rating of 52% based on 189 reviews, with an average rating of 5.9/10. The website's critics consensus reads, "While far from a failure, Magic in the Moonlight is too slight to stand with Woody Allen's finest work." Metacritic, which uses a weighted average, assigned the film a score of 54 out of 100, based on 40 critics, indicating "mixed or average" reviews.

Rex Reed, writing for The New York Observer, gave the film a largely positive review, calling it "a masterstroke of enchantment" and praising Colin Firth's performance. Jordan Hoffman of MTV News also enjoyed the film, stating, "This picture isn't as showy or obvious as one of his (many) masterpieces, but it is quite good and deserves your time and respect." In The New Yorker, David Denby agreed that Colin Firth "carries [the film] through." In The Wall Street Journal, Joe Morgenstern complimented Emma Stone and concluded, "Think of it as a 97-minute séance that draws you in, spins you around, subverts your suppositions, levitates your spirits and leaves you giddy with delight".

However, in Vanity Fair, Richard Lawson criticized Stone's acting, arguing that "her line delivery is too modern to really work convincingly in the period, and like many other nonetheless talented actors, she has trouble with Allen's stilted, formal cadence." He added that the age gap between Stone and Firth (28 years) was "a little gross" and "icky". Alan Scherstuhl of The Village Voice disliked the film, criticizing its familiarity from Allen's previous work and believing the writing was uninspired. Chris Nashawaty of Entertainment Weekly gave the movie a "B−" grade (from A+ to F), remarking that it was funny and "pleasant", but also forgettable. Salon's Andrew O'Hehir felt that the characters were not drawn out enough because of poor writing. A. O. Scott of The New York Times wrote, "Mr. Allen has had his ups and downs over the years. Rarely, though, has he put a story on screen that manifests so little energy, so little curiosity about its own ideas and situations."

In 2016, film critics Robbie Collin and Tim Robey of The Daily Telegraph ranked Magic in the Moonlight as one of the worst films by Allen.
