= Bing & Satchmo =

Studio album by Bing Crosby and Louis Armstrong
- Released: October 1960
- Recorded: June 28–30, 1960
- Studio: Hollywood, Los Angeles
- Genre: Vocal jazz, traditional pop
- Length: 38:51
- Label: MGM
- Producer: Simon Rady

Bing Crosby chronology
| Join Bing and Sing Along (1960) | Bing & Satchmo (1960) | Songs of Christmas (1960) |

Louis Armstrong chronology
| Louie and the Dukes of Dixieland (1961) | Bing & Louis (1960) | Louis Armstrong and Duke Ellington: The Great Summit/Complete Sessions (1961) |

Bing & Satchmo is a 1960 studio album by Bing Crosby and Louis Armstrong that was arranged and conducted by Billy May. The album was recorded for Crosby's label, Project Records, and released by MGM.

Crosby and Armstrong worked together many times before they recorded this album, appearing in films such as Pennies from Heaven (1936), Here Comes the Groom (1951), and High Society (1956). They made several radio broadcasts together between 1949 and 1951.

The lyrics of the songs were adapted for them by a number of notable songwriters.

Eleven tracks were issued on the LP, excluding "(Up A) Lazy River" because Armstrong had recorded it for another company. Permission was granted for it to be included in the All Star Festival LP issued in 1963 on behalf of the United Nations to help refugees around the world. Johnny Mercer sings a few lines with the chorus on this track.

"Dardanella" and "Muskrat Ramble" were released as singles in October 1960. Billboard magazine commented that the tracks would be popular with "jocks".

== Reception ==
Professional ratings
Review scores
| Source | Rating |
|---|---|
| AllMusic | 3.5/5 stars |

The Billboard magazine review from October 31, 1960, selected the album for its pop spotlight and called it a "group of nostalgic tunes that provide excellent easy listening programming." Variety said that the album "provides a lot of listening pleasure. Both are masters of their craft and know how to pack a vocal punch with seemingly little effort.

John Bush on AllMusic gave the album three and half stars out of five. Bush wrote, "Could anything but warmth and playfulness result when the two most seminal, expressive voices of the 20th century found the room to stretch out on a full LP together?" Bush reserved criticism for the vocal chorus that appears on the album.

== Track listing ==
| No. | Title | Writer(s) | Length |
|---|---|---|---|
| 1. | "Muskrat Ramble" | Kid Ory, Ray Gilbert | 3:03 |
| 2. | "Sugar (That Sugar Baby O' Mine)" | Maceo Pinkard, Edna Alexander, Sidney D. Mitchell | 5:13 |
| 3. | "The Preacher" | Horace Silver | 2:21 |
| 4. | "Dardanella" | Fred Fisher, Felix Bernard, Johnny S. Black | 2:50 |
| 5. | "Let's Sing Like a Dixieland Band" | Alan Bergman | 2:21 |
| 6. | "Way Down Yonder in New Orleans" | Joe Turner Layton, Henry Creamer | 3:09 |
| 7. | "Brother Bill" | Louis Armstrong | 3:01 |
| 8. | "Little Ol' Tune" | Johnny Mercer | 3:07 |
| 9. | "At the Jazz Band Ball" | Nick LaRocca, Larry Shields, Johnny Mercer | 3:02 |
| 10. | "Rocky Mountain Moon" | Johnny Mercer | 3:42 |
| 11. | "Bye Bye Blues" | Fred Hamm, Dave Bennett, Bert Lown, and Chauncey Gray | 3:48 |
| 12. | "(Up a) Lazy River" (bonus song on 2009 CD reissue) | Hoagy Carmichael, Sidney Arodin | 3:14 |

== Personnel ==
- Bing Crosby – vocals
- Louis Armstrong – trumpet, vocals
- Dick Cathcart – trumpet
- Shorty Sherock – trumpet
- Abe Lincoln – trombone
- Tommy Pederson – trombone
- Moe Schneider – trombone
- Chuck Gentry – saxophone
- Matty Matlock – saxophone
- Wilbur Schwartz – saxophone
- Justin Gordon – reeds
- Stan Wrightsman – piano
- George Van Eps – guitar
- Morty Corb – double bass
- Nick Fatool – drums
- Johnny Mercer – special effects, vocals
- Billy May – arranger, conductor
- Judd Conlon – choir contractor, choir director
- Gil Mershorn – choir, Bernie Parks, Thomas D. Kenny, Joseph Pryor, Burton A. Dole, Jack Graberman, Paul Ely

Production

- Simon Rady – record producer
- Wild Bill Thompson – choir arrangement

Reissue CD

- Will Friedwald – liner notes
- Anaida Garcia – associate producer
- Hugh Fordin – reissue producer
