= Dixieland Jass Band One-Step =

1917 song by the Original Dixieland Jazz Band

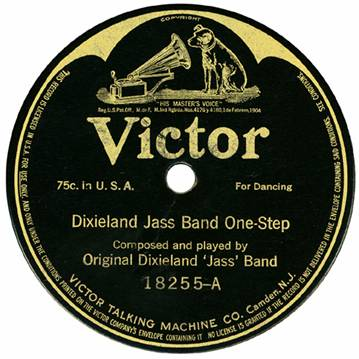
- 1917 first pressing release on Victor as 18255-A.

Song by Original Dixieland Jass Band
- Released: 1917
- Genre: Jazz
- Label: Victor Talking Machine Company

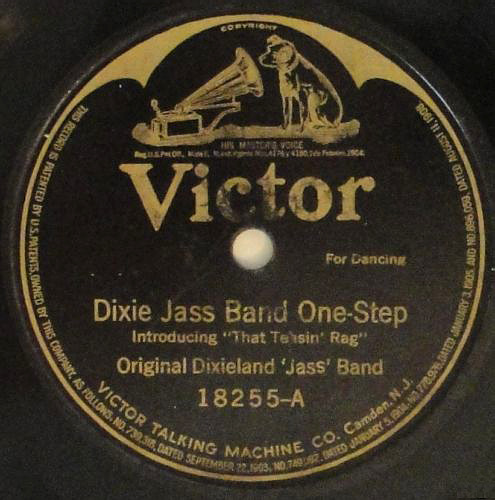
The second pressing changed the title to "Dixie Jass Band One-Step" Introducing "That Teasin' Rag".

"Dixieland Jazz Band One-Step", also known as "Dixie Jass Band One-Step" and "Original Dixieland One-Step", is a 1917 jazz composition by the Original Dixieland Jass Band released as an instrumental on a 78rpm record, issued by the Victor Talking Machine Company. The song is a jazz milestone as the first commercially released "jass" or jazz song.

== Background ==
The ODJB released the song in 1917 with the catalog number 18255-A by the Victor Talking Machine Company of Camden, New Jersey. The B side was the landmark jazz song "Livery Stable Blues". The personnel on the recording were Nick LaRocca (cornet), Larry Shields (clarinet), Eddie Edwards (trombone), Henry Ragas (piano), and Tony Sbarbaro (drums).

The ODJB initially auditioned for Columbia Records. A month after the audition, the band began recording for Victor. They made recordings on February 26, 1917. The first jazz record released was Victor 18255, which featured "Dixieland Jass Band One-Step" as the A side, "Composed and played by Original Dixieland 'Jass' Band", backed by "Livery Stable Blues". The "one-step" designation on one label was changed to "fox trot" on another label. The phrase "For Dancing" appeared to the right of the spindle hole on both sides of the disc.

Following lawsuits, Victor changed the label of both sides of the release. The inclusion in "Dixieland Jass Band One-Step" of a strain from Joe Jordan's 1909 "That Teasin' Rag" resulted in a suit for copyright infringement. The earliest copies of the first ODJB disc do not cite Jordan's rag but later copies noted "Introducing 'That Teasin' Rag'". The title on side A of the disc was changed to "Dixie Jass Band One-Step." Posters promoting the band's live concerts in 1921 added that Victor 18255 featured the song "Ramblin' Blues"--"Dixie Jass Band One-Step". For the second pressing of side B, "Livery Stable Blues Composed and played by the Original Dixieland Jass Band" omitted the phrase "Composed and played by".

Max Hart, the manager of the ODJB, made an agreement with J. W. Stern in 1917 for the publication rights to "Dixieland Jass Band One- Step." Nick LaRocca wrote to Eddie Edwards on November 8, 1929: "Ed, I want you to look up Max Hart and see if he will sign the Dixieland one step to one of us so we can get behind the publisher to settle up with us, on royalty due band. Suppose you go and see J. W. Stern or his successor and get the dope on same. Do not let him know what your motives are. I have in my possession the contract but that is made between Max Hart and J. W. Stern. Also, ask Mr. Hart for statements, if any, from Victor Co. This number promises to be a big hit but no one seems able to get orchestrations on same."

In 1936, the reformed ODJB recorded a new version of the song as "Original Dixieland One-Step" on October 9 in New York and released it as a 78 single on Victor as 25502 backed with "Barnyard Blues", itself a version of "Livery Stable Blues".

== Other recordings ==
1937 UK sheet music cover of a new arrangement as "Original Dixieland One-Step", Peter Maurice Music, London.

In 1933, Nick LaRocca copyrighted a new arrangement of the song under the title "Original Dixieland One-Step" with Edward Marks in New York. In 1937, he copyrighted the song for the UK publication with Peter Maurice in London. The song was described as "a new arrangement of the familiar jazz favorite with vocal refrain" on the sheet music cover which featured photographs of the Original Dixieland Jazz Band in 1937 and 1919.

The Castle Jazz band recorded the song in 1949 and released it on Castle Records as a 78. Sonny Brooks and His orchestra released the song as "Dixieland One-Step" on Cahill with the songwriting credit to Nick LaRocca. Kid Ory recorded the song as "Original Dixieland One-Step". "Original Dixieland One-Step" was released by the Sextette from Hunger led by Eddie Skrivanek with George Thow, Joe Yukl, Blake Reynolds, Charlie LaVere, Richard Cornell, and Country and Washburne on MacGregor 1026 in the early 1950s. Jack Teagarden, Tommy Dorsey and his Clambake Seven, Coleman Hawkins, and Doc Evans in 1947 also recorded the song under the title "Original Dixieland One-Step".

The song was featured in the film The Benny Goodman Story.

== Sources ==
- Gracyk, Tim, Frank Hoffmann, and B. Lee Cooper. Popular American Recording Pioneers, 1895–1925. Haworth Popular Culture Series. Routledge, 2000.
- Stewart, Jack. "The Original Dixieland Jazz Band's Place in the Development of Jazz." New Orleans International Music Colloquium, 2005.
- Lange, Horst H. Wie der Jazz begann: 1916–1923, von der "Original Dixieland Jazz Band" bis zu King Olivers "Creole Jazz Band". Berlin: Colloquium Verlag, 1991. ISBN 3-7678-0779-3
- Brunn, H.O. The Story of the Original Dixieland Jazz Band. Baton Rouge: Louisiana State University Press, 1960. Reprinted by Da Capo Press, 1977. ISBN 0-306-70892-2
