= At the Jazz Band Ball =

1917 song by the Original Dixieland Jazz Band

- Sheet music

Song
- Written: 1917
- Published: 1928 by Leo Feist, Inc.
- Recorded: March 19, 1918
- Genre: Jazz
- Label: Victor Records
- Composers: Larry Shields and Nick LaRocca

Audio sample
- Recording of At the Jazz Band Ball, performed by the Original Dixieland Jazz Band (1918): file; help

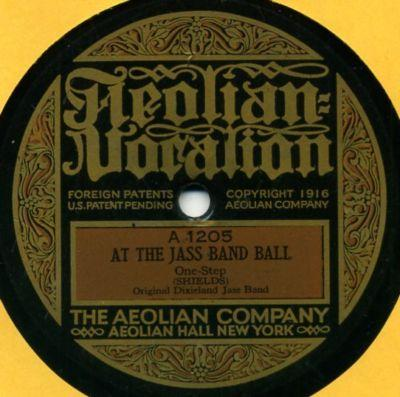
1917 release as an Aeolian Vocalion 78, A1205, as "At the Jass Band Ball".

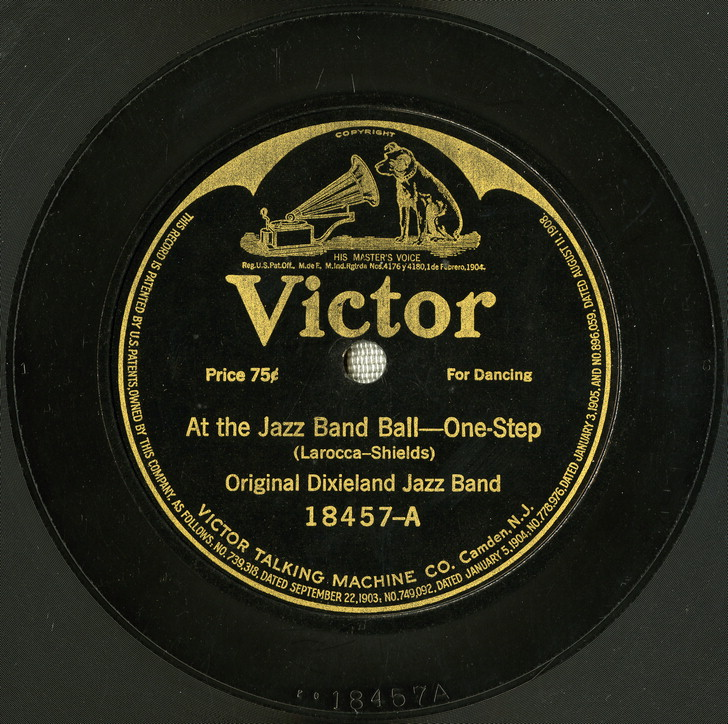
"At the Jazz Band Ball" by the ODJB released as a Victor 78 single, 18457-A, 1918.

"At the Jazz Band Ball" is a 1917 jazz instrumental recorded by the Original Dixieland Jazz Band. The instrumental is one of the earliest and most recorded jazz compositions. It is a jazz classic and a standard of the genre.

The instrumental was recorded by Larry Shields, Tony Sbarbaro, Henry Ragas, Nick LaRocca, and Eddie Edwards, the members of the Original Dixieland Jazz Band. It was composed by Nick LaRocca and Larry Shields, and first recorded as "At the Jass Band Ball" by the Original Dixieland Jazz Band on September 3, 1917, in New York and released as an Aeolian Vocalion single, A1205. The instrumental was rerecorded on March 19, 1918, and was released as a Victor 78 single, Victor 18457, Matrix #B-21583/1, with "Ostrich Walk" as the flip side. A third version was recorded on April 16, 1919, in London, England and released as a 78 single as Columbia 735 with "Barnyard Blues" as the flip side.

Lyricist Johnny Mercer added lyrics to the original 1917 ODJB instrumental in 1950.

== Other recordings ==
Bix Beiderbecke and His Gang recorded it in 1927. Bobby Hackett and His Orchestra in 1938. Muggsy Spanier and His Ragtime Band and Bud Freeman and His Famous Chicagoans recorded in 1940. Spanier's recording was RCA Bluebird B-10518-A. In 1959, The Dukes of Dixieland released an album entitled At the Jazz Band Ball featuring an instrumental version of the song as the opening track. Bing Crosby and Louis Armstrong recorded the song in 1960 for their album Bing & Satchmo. Pete Fountain, Bob Crosby, George Barnes and his Octet, Phil Napoleon's Emperor's of Jazz, Nappy Lamare, Kenny Ball and His Jazzmen, Gene Krupa and his Chicago Jazz, Eddie Condon, Art Hodes, Sidney Bechet, Joe Venutti, the Sons of Bix, Nick LaRocca and His Dixieland Jazz Band, Kid Ory, the Belgrade Dixieland Orchestra, and Ted Heath are other recordings.

== Sources ==
- Stewart, Jack. "The Original Dixieland Jazz Band's Place in the Development of Jazz." New Orleans International Music Colloquium, 2005.
- Lange, Horst H. Wie der Jazz begann: 1916-1923, von der "Original Dixieland Jazz Band" bis zu King Olivers "Creole Jazz Band". Berlin: Colloquium Verlag, 1991. ISBN 3-7678-0779-3
- Brunn, H.O. The Story of the Original Dixieland Jazz Band. Baton Rouge: Louisiana State University Press, 1960. Reprinted by Da Capo Press, 1977. ISBN 0-306-70892-2
