= Papa Jack Laine =

American musician and pioneering band leader (1873-1966)

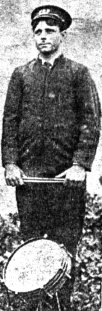
- Laine in 1906

Background information
- Also known as: Jack Laine, Papa Jack, Papa Laine
- Born: George Vitelle Laine; September 21, 1873; New Orleans, Louisiana, U.S.
- Origin: New Orleans, Louisiana, U.S.
- Died: June 1, 1966 (aged 92) Metairie, Louisiana, U.S.
- Genres: Marching band Traditional jazz Jazz; Blues; Rag-time
- Instrument: drums

George Vitelle "Papa Jack" Laine (September 21, 1873 – June 1, 1966) was an American musician and a pioneering band leader in New Orleans in the years from the Spanish–American War to World War I. He was often credited for training many musicians who would later become successful in jazz music.

Laine's Reliance Brass Band was the first to fuse European, African, and Latin music. The earliest jazz musicians can be traced back to playing in the Reliance Brass Band or being influenced by those who had.

Many of the New Orleans musicians who first spread jazz around the United States in the 1910s and 1920s got their start in Laine's marching band, including the members of the Original Dixieland Jass Band.

== Career ==
Laine was a drummer, but he was more noted for his skills at arranging and booking bands. Laine's musicians included individuals from most of New Orleans' many ethnic groups: African American, English, French, German, Irish, Italian, Jewish, Latin American, Scottish, etc. He started leading bands in 1885 before the Jim Crow laws went into effect in New Orleans.

Due to the diverse background of many of his band's members, a broad range of ideas developed and fused, leading to the early beginnings of jazz music.

Even after segregation laws started demanding "whites" and "colored" be kept separate, Laine continued to hire light- and medium light-skinned African-American musicians, claiming that they were "Cuban" or "Mexican" if any segregationist tried to start trouble. Therefore, his band attracted a large and diverse group of people such as Mexican clarinetist Lorenzo Tio, Sr., a pioneer of the jazz solo. Laine believed music brought people together.

Laine retired from the music booking business by 1920, but he was interviewed a number of times, providing first-hand accounts of the early days of the development of New Orleans jazz.

On January 1, 1951, Laine was made an Honorary Life Member and given the title of "Father of White Jazz" by the New Orleans Jazz Club.

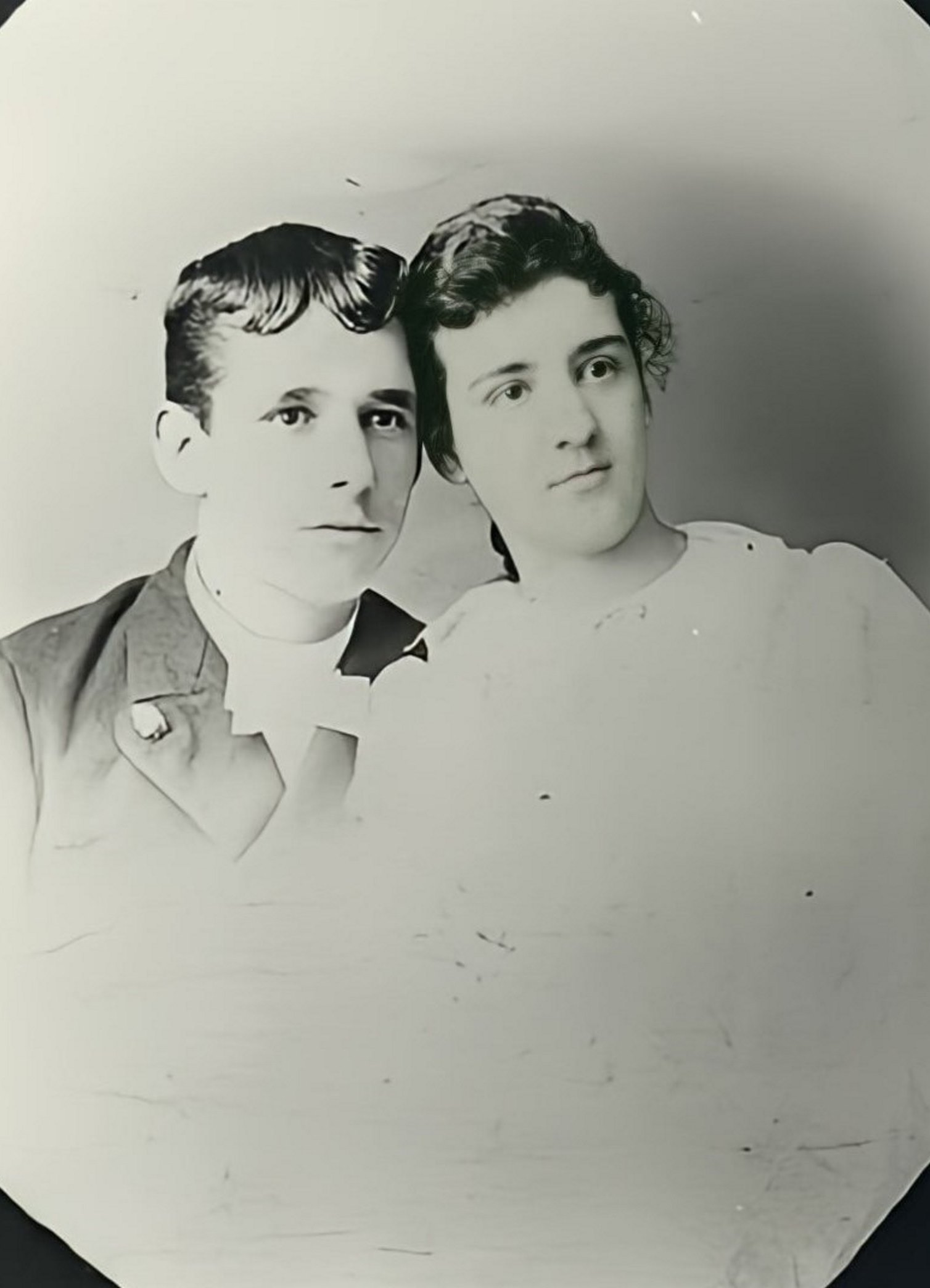
Papa Jack and his wife Blanche Nunez (Mama Laine), 1894

== List of musicians hired by Laine to play in his bands ==
Laine hired well over 100 musicians to play in his bands, including the following:

- Chink Martin Abraham
- Achille Baquet
- Abbie Brunies
- George Brunies
- Merritt Brunies
- Emile Christian
- Frank Christian
- Eddie Edwards
- Nick LaRocca
- Gussie Mueller
- Alcide Nunez
- Alphonse Picou
- Larry Shields
- Henry Ragas
- Tony Sbarbaro
- Ragbaby Stephens
