= Johnny Stein =

American jazz drummer and bandleader (1895–1962)

John Philip Hountha Stein (1891 or 1895 in New Orleans – September 30, 1962 in New Orleans) was an American jazz drummer and bandleader.

Stein's surnames are the subject of much confusion; his mother's name was Stein from a previous marriage, and although he was apparently given the last name Hountha, he used Stein professionally. He put together a band in New Orleans in 1915, which included Alcide Nunez, Eddie Edwards, Henry Ragas, and Nick LaRocca; this group played an extended run at the Schiller Cafe in Chicago in 1916. In the middle of that year, Edwards, Ragas, and LaRocca all left Stein's band and formed the Original Dixieland Jazz Band; Stein later made the case that he deserved credit for the formation of this group, which was the first to record jazz music.

Following their departure he put together an entirely new band to finish his contract at the Schiller. Shortly after this he moved to New York City and played with Jimmy Durante's Original New Orleans Jazz Band in 1918-1920, also recording with them on Gennett Records. He continued to lead bands and play as a sideman in New York and Chicago until 1961, when he returned to New Orleans. He died there the following year.
