= Harry Shields =

American jazz clarinetist (1899–1971)

- Born: Uptown New Orleans, Louisiana, U.S.
- Died: January 19, 1971 (aged 71)
- Genres: Jazz
- Instrument: clarinetist

Harry Shields (June 30, 1899 – January 19, 1971) was an American jazz clarinetist.

== Background ==
Shields was born in Uptown New Orleans, the younger brother of noted clarinetist Larry Shields. He spent almost his entire career in New Orleans. He played with the bands of Norman Brownlee, Sharkey Bonano, Tom Brown, Johnny Wiggs, and others. Many fellow musicians regarded Harry as superior to his more famous brother, Larry. Johnny Wiggs commented that Shields was the only clarinetist he'd heard who could always play the right note without fail.
