= Original Dixieland Jass Band =

American jazz band

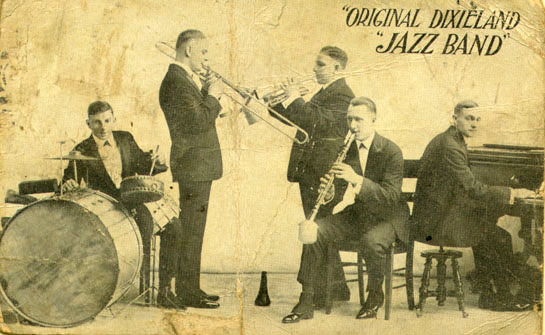
- 1918 promotional postcard of the ODJB showing (from left), drummer Tony Sbarbaro (a.k.a. Tony Spargo), trombonist Edwin "Daddy" Edwards, cornetist Dominick James "Nick" LaRocca, clarinetist Larry Shields, and pianist Henry Ragas

Background information
- Origin: New Orleans, Louisiana, U.S.
- Genres: Jazz; Dixieland
- Years active: 1916–1926, 1936–1938
- Labels: Victor; Okeh
- Past members: Tony Sbarbaro (a.k.a. Tony Spargo); Edwin "Eddie" Edwards; D. James "Nick" LaRocca; Larry Shields; Henry Ragas; J. Russel Robinson

The Original Dixieland Jass Band, later Original Dixieland Jazz Band (ODJB), was a Dixieland jazz band that made many of the earliest jazz recordings in 1917. Their "Livery Stable Blues" became the first jazz record ever issued. The group composed and recorded many jazz standards, the most famous being "Tiger Rag". In late 1917, the spelling of the band's name was changed to Original Dixieland Jazz Band.

The band’s original members were Nick LaRocca (cornet), Eddie Edwards (trombone), Larry Shields (clarinet), Henry Ragas (piano), and Tony Sbarbaro (drums). Several members had previously performed in bands led by the New Orleans musician Papa Jack Laine. By late 1917, the group had adopted the spelling “Jazz” in its name.

ODJB billed itself as "the Creators of Jazz". It was the first band to record jazz commercially and to have hit recordings in the genre. Band leader and cornetist Nick LaRocca argued that ODJB deserved recognition as the first band to record jazz commercially and the first band to establish jazz as a musical idiom or genre.

The original quintet disbanded in 1926. Ten years later, Nick LaRocca recruited most of the quintet to form a new swing band featuring the ODJB members. The full quintet reunited in 1936 to great acclaim, and finally disbanded in 1938.

== Origins ==
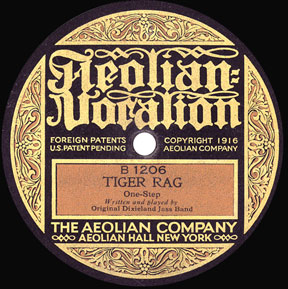
The first release of "Tiger Rag" on Aeolian Vocalion, B1206, 1917

In early 1916, a promoter from Chicago approached clarinetist Alcide Nunez and drummer Johnny Stein about bringing a New Orleans-style band to Chicago, where the similar Brown's Band From Dixieland, led by trombonist Tom Brown, was enjoying success. They then assembled trombonist Eddie Edwards, pianist Henry Ragas, and cornetist Frank Christian. Shortly before they were to leave, Christian backed out, and Nick LaRocca was hired as a last-minute replacement.

On March 3, 1916 the musicians began their job at Schiller's Cafe in Chicago under the name Stein's Dixie Jass Band. The band was a hit and received offers of higher pay elsewhere. Since Stein as leader was the only musician under contract by name, the rest of the band broke off, sent to New Orleans for drummer Tony Sbarbaro, and on June 5, started playing under the name, The Dixie Jass Band. LaRocca and Nunez had personality conflicts, and on October 30 Tom Brown's Band and ODJB agreed to swap clarinetists, bringing Larry Shields into the Original Dixieland Jass Band. The band attracted the attention of theatrical agent Max Hart, who booked the band in New York City. At the start of 1917 the band began an engagement playing for dancing at Reisenweber's Cafe, on Columbus Circle, in Manhattan.

LaRocca and Sbarbaro were both children of Sicilian immigrants, part of the substantial Sicilian community that had settled in New Orleans between the 1880s and early 1900s. Historian Claudio Lo Cascio, drawing on US Immigration Service records, has documented how Sicilian musicians in that community brought with them a tradition of marching band performance, the Sicilian banda, that merged with the African-American brass band culture already flourishing in New Orleans, contributing to the instrumentation and call-and-response structures that would define early jazz.

== First recordings ==
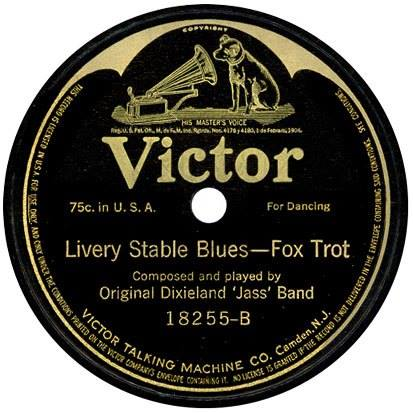
The world's first jazz record: ODJB 1917 Victor release of "Livery Stable Blues", 18255-B

Livery Stable Blues
Original Dixieland Jass Band's original 1917 recording of Livery Stable Blues.

While a couple of other New Orleans bands had passed through New York City slightly earlier, they were part of vaudeville acts. ODJB, on the other hand, played for dancing and hence, were the first "jass" band to get a following of fans in New York and then record at a time when the American recording industry was essentially centered in the northeastern United States, primarily in New York City and Camden, New Jersey.

Shortly after arriving in New York, a letter dated January 29, 1917, offered the band an audition for the Columbia Graphophone Company. The session took place on Wednesday, January 31, 1917. Nothing from this test session was issued.

The band then recorded two sides for the Victor Talking Machine Company, "Livery Stable Blues" and "Dixieland Jass Band One-Step", on February 26, 1917 at Victor's New York studios. These titles were released as Victor 18255 in May 1917, the first issued jazz record. The band's recordings, first marketed as a novelty, were a surprise hit, and gave many Americans their first taste of jazz. Musician Joe Jordan sued, since the "One Step" incorporated portions of his 1909 ragtime composition "That Teasin' Rag". The record labels subsequently were changed to "Introducing 'That Teasin' Rag' by Joe Jordan". A court case dispute over the authorship of "Livery Stable Blues" resulted in the judge declaring the tune in the "public domain".

In the wake of the group's success of the Victor record, the ODJB returned to Columbia in May, recording two selections of popular tunes of the day chosen for them by the label (possibly hoping to avoid the copyright problems which arose after Victor recorded two of the band's supposedly original compositions) "Darktown Strutters' Ball" and "(Back Home Again in) Indiana" as catalogue A-2297.

Numerous jazz bands were formed in the wake of the success of ODJB that copied and replicated its style and sound. Also bands were brought from Chicago and California (such as the Frisco Jass Band) in an attempts to join the jazz craze. Established bands of different types and bandleaders such as Wilbur Sweatman began billing their groups as "jass" or "jazz" bands. Earl Fuller, bandleader at a competing New York venue, was ordered by management to form a "jass" band.

W. C. Handy recorded one of the earliest cover versions of an ODJB tune when he released a recording of "Livery Stable Blues" by Handy's Orchestra of Memphis for Columbia in 1917.

In 1918, the song "When You Hear That Dixieland Jazz Band Play" by Shelton Brooks, "the King of Ragtime Writers", was published by Will Rossiter in Chicago. It was a tribute to the Original Dixieland Jazz Band, who were featured on the cover.

== Original New Orleans Jazz Band ==
When the New Orleans Jazz style swept New York by storm in 1917 with the arrival of the Original Dixieland Jazz Band, Jimmy Durante was part of the audience at Reisenweber's Cafe on Columbus Circle when ODJB played that venue. Durante was very impressed with the band and invited them to play at a club called the Alamo in Harlem where Jimmy played piano.

Durante had his friend, Johnny Stein (the previous drummer and leader of the group), assemble a group of like-minded New Orleans musicians to accompany his act at the Alamo. Stein did so, with a band consisting of fellow veterans of the Laine bands in New Orleans, other than pianist Durante. In late 1918 they recorded two sides for Okeh under the name of the New Orleans Jazz Band. They recorded the same two numbers a couple of months later for Gennett under the name of Original New Orleans Jazz Band, and in 1920 the same group recorded again for Gennett as Jimmy Durante's Jazz Band. They later billed themselves as "Durante's Jazz and Novelty Band".

== Later history of the band ==
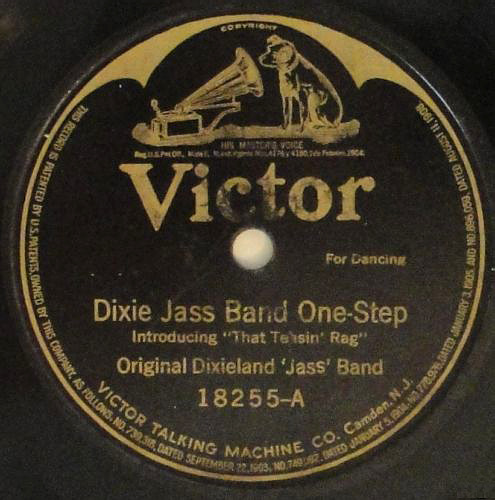
Victor second pressing release of "Dixie Jass Band One-Step", 18255-A, 1917

After their initial recording for the Victor Company, the ODJB recorded for Columbia Records (after the first Victor session, not before as has sometimes been reported) and Aeolian-Vocalion in 1917, then returned to Victor the following year, while enjoying continued popularity in New York. Trombonist Edwards was drafted for World War I in 1918 and replaced by Emile Christian, and pianist Henry Ragas died of influenza in the 1918 flu pandemic the following year and he was replaced by pianist and composer J. Russel Robinson.

Robinson's compositions for the band recorded and released in 1920, include the classic "Margie" and "Palesteena (Lena from Palesteena)", were among the most popular and best-selling hits of 1920. "Aggravatin' Papa" was composed with lyricist Roy Turk and Addie Britt and was recorded by Alberta Hunter in 1923 with Fletcher Henderson's Dance Orchestra and also by Bessie Smith, Sophie Tucker, Florence Mills, Lucille Hegamin, and Pearl Bailey. Robinson also collaborated with Roy Turk on the compositions "Sweet Man O' Mine" and "A-Wearin' Away the Blues", and he wrote "Mama Whip! Mama Spank! (If Her Daddy Don't Come Home)" for blues and jazz singer Mamie Smith and her Jazz Band in 1921, which were released on the Okeh label. Robinson was a member of the band until 1923; he rejoined the band when it reformed in 1936.

"Margie", composed by J. Russel Robinson with Con Conrad, with lyrics added by Benny Davis, has been covered over a hundred times. "Margie" has been recorded by Louis Armstrong, who also covered the band's "Tiger Rag", Ray Charles, Al Jolson, Duke Ellington and His Orchestra in 1935, the Billy Kyle Swing Club Band, Claude Hopkins, Red Nichols, Django Reinhardt, George Paxton, the Dutch Swing College Band, Fats Domino, Sidney Bechet, Don Redman, Cab Calloway, Jim Reeves, Gene Krupa, and Benny Goodman.

"Margie" was a no. 9 hit for ODJB in 1921 with J. Russel Robinson on piano. Eddie Cantor had the biggest hit version of the ODJB classic, spending five weeks at no. 1 in 1921. The song also was featured in the movie The Eddie Cantor Story and was the theme of the television series of the same name in 1961–1962. Cantor also recorded ODJB's "Palesteena (Lena from Palesteena)". Gene Rodemich and His Orchestra reached no. 7 with their version in 1920. Ted Lewis and His Band reached no. 4 in 1921. Frank Crumit had a no. 7 hit in 1921. Claude Hopkins and His Orchestra reached no. 5 in 1934 with Orlando Peterson on vocals. Don Redman and His Orchestra got to no. 15 in 1939 with a cover of the ODJB song. Dave Brubeck, Bix Beiderbecke, Bing Crosby, Jo Stafford, Erroll Garner, Oscar Peterson, Charlie Shavers, Jimmy Smith, Joe Venuti, Ray Barretto, and Shelly Manne also have recorded the song. Jimmie Lunceford recorded the song in 1938 with a Sy Oliver arrangement that featured Trummy Young.

== London tour ==
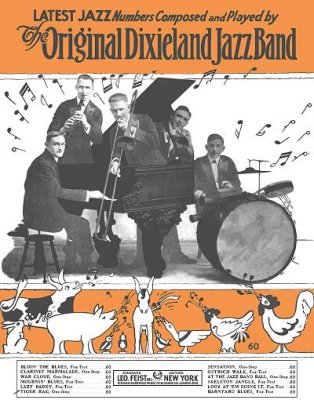
"Tiger Rag" sheet music, 1918, Original Dixieland Jazz Band, Leo Feist, New York

Other New Orleans musicians, including Nunez, Tom Brown, and Frank Christian, followed ODJB's example and went to New York to play jazz as well, giving the band competition. LaRocca decided to take the band to London, where they would once again enjoy being the only authentic New Orleans jazz band in the metropolis, and again present themselves as the Originators of Jazz because they were the first band to record the new genre of music dubbed jass or jazz. The band's April 7, 1919 appearance in the revue Joy Bells at the London Hippodrome was the first official live jazz performance by any band in the United Kingdom and was followed by a command performance for King George V at Buckingham Palace. The concert did not start auspiciously, with the assembled aristocracy, which included French Marshal Philippe Pétain, peering through opera glasses at the band "as though there were bugs on us", according to LaRocca. The audience loosened up, however, after the king laughed and loudly applauded their rendition of "The Tiger Rag". The British tour ended with the band being chased to the Southampton docks by Lord Harrington, who was infuriated that his daughter was being romanced by the lead singer of the band. In London, they made twenty more recordings for the British branch of Columbia. While in London, they recorded the second, more commercially successful, version of their hit song "Soudan" (also known as "Oriental Jass").

The band returned to the United States in July 1920 and toured for four years. This version of the band played in a more commercial style, adding a saxophone to the arrangements in the manner of other popular orchestras. Jazz pianist and composer Frank Signorelli, who collaborated on the jazz standards "A Blues Serenade" recorded by Glenn Miller and Duke Ellington, "Gypsy", and "Stairway to the Stars", joined the ODJB for a brief time in 1921.

In November 1925 Nick LaRocca announced that he was retiring from the music business. He was replaced by 19-year-old trumpeter Henry Levine, who in 1940 brought this kind of repertoire to the NBC radio show The Chamber Music Society of Lower Basin Street. With LaRocca's departure Tony Sbarbaro, now the only original member of the ODJB, became the bandleader. The personnel for this final incarnation of the "original" ODJB was Tony Sbarbaro (drums), Henry Levine (trumpet), Artie Seaberg (clarinet), Al Caplan (trombone), and Wilder Chase (piano). The band finished out its contract with New York's Cinderella Ballroom in February 1926, and then disbanded.

== Break-ups and reunions ==
The band broke up in 1926 because its brand of free-wheeling jazz was then considered old-fashioned. As Abel Green of Variety put it: "[Paul] Whiteman with his symphonic syncopation came along and made America and the world conscious of his arranged sweet foxtrotology. Then the Dixieland Band folded for good."

The band members scattered. Leader/trumpeter Nick LaRocca returned to his construction business in New Orleans. Clarinetist Larry Shields moved to Chicago, then to New Orleans where he worked for a Bible publisher. Trombonist Eddie Edwards was discovered operating a newsstand in New York City; newspaper publicity resulted in Edwards fronting a local nightclub band. Drummer Tony Sbarbaro was now a mechanic. Pianist J. Russel Robinson was in radio, a musical director for the NBC network. Although Variety reported in November 1932 that Victor planned to use the band in new remakes of their old hits, only Eddie Edwards and Tony Sbarbaro were mentioned, with nightclub emcee Kendall Capps set to front the "Original Dixieland Jazz Band" in live performances. Nothing came of this and no recordings resulted.

In October 1935 Tony Sbarbaro recorded four sides for Vocalion with his own quintet, billed as "Original Dixieland Jazz Band". In early 1936 Nick LaRocca and Larry Shields reunited in New Orleans for a hotel date. Encouraged by the response, they continued to play local clubs and private functions. LaRocca, gauging the audiences for dance-band music, listened to the latest swing records and decided that the ODJB could appeal to those listeners as well. He assembled a 14-piece swing band featuring four members of the ODJB: himself, Larry Shields, J. Russel Robinson, and Tony Sbarbaro. "Nick LaRocca and The Original Dixieland Band" recorded nine sides for Victor in September 1936. Trade columnists welcomed these new big-band versions of the old hits, with the technological advance of electrical recording (with microphones) yielding a tremendous improvement in fidelity over the old acoustic recordings. Clarinetist Larry Shields received particularly positive attention: "It is here that one of the all too few opportunities to hear and judge Shields by himself is found," wrote The Record Changer. "It is Larry Shields who packs the punch, much as he did in the regular, smaller band."

Eddie Edwards, the only ODJB member absent from the first big-band session on September 2, showed up at the studio toward the end of the second big-band session on September 25. The original quintet ran through "Skeleton Jangle" without the big band. The take went so well that Victor invited the quintet back into the studio to record five more songs on November 10, 1936. Victor credited these records to "The Original Dixieland Five" to avoid confusion with Victor's "Original Dixieland Band" records then in circulation. Benny Goodman (who was present at the quintet's Victor recording session) named Shields as an important early influence, and invited the band to appear on his network radio show, where the ODJB was a sensation. The band was booked into New York's famous Paramount theater in April 1937, one month after Goodman's spectacular showing at the Paramount. Victor even coupled the new Goodman recording of "St. Louis Blues" with the Original Dixieland Five's recording of "Clarinet Marmalade" on the same 78-rpm disc.

The ODJB reunion received widespread publicity, including a March of Time newsreel re-creating the group's first recording session and showing their successful performance in Boston on December 31, 1936. J. Russel Robinson compared the band's style to modern swing, which reporter Abel Green encapsulated: "Swing is no different basically than the old Dixieland style. The sole difference is that today it is closer harmony, because it's arranged. The arranger scores the supposed improvisations because otherwise it would sound like bedlam. When a small combo of four or five jams it out, no arrangement is necessary because each instrumentalist merely takes the chorus lead in sequence."

Ken Murray, always a fan of bygone acts, hired the band in late 1936 for a tour of personal appearances. Bass violinist Harry Barth was added to the band in January 1937 for these stage shows. A Variety reviewer caught the Baltimore engagement and disapproved of Murray's handling: "Unfortunately boys aren't getting the spotlight they deserve. They're part of Murray's act and, with two brief exceptions, there's something in front of band [at] all times. To many, that old act has been mythical, especially in last year-and-half. Murray didn't even adequately explain band's background when intro'ing it. Comic should certainly take advantage of what he has in his own act."

After the stint with Murray, the band's radio and stage appearances were now being arranged by veteran band booker and manager Ed Kirkeby. The band opened Billy Rose's opulent Frontier Fiesta club in Fort Worth, Texas in July 1937. They played throughout the summer at the Dallas-Fort Worth Exposition, and returned to New York on October 1 for a booking at the Old New York nightclub. Toward the end of the tour, there were disagreements about LaRocca's leadership; Harry Barth had left angrily on August 7 when he asked LaRocca for a raise and was refused. LaRocca and Edwards also argued back and forth. On January 17, 1938, LaRocca served notice on both the band members and the musicians' union in New York that the ODJB would be disbanding. The band officially broke up on February 1, 1938.

In the immediate aftermath, two factions competed as the Original Dixieland Jazz Band. Edwards, Shields, and Sbarbaro had one more recording date with Victor on February 18, 1938; they were augmented by New York-area sidemen and vocalist Lola Bard. They recorded six songs for Victor's Bluebird label, and the records were credited to the "Original Dixieland Jazz Band with Shields, Edwards and Sbarbaro; vocal refrain by Lola Bard." The Edwards band toured the southern United States in the spring of 1938. Meanwhile the other two members, LaRocca and Robinson, had "their own combo in New York".

Most of the ODJB veterans continued to work after Nick La Rocca retired completely from the musical scene. In November 1943 Tony Sbarbaro, claiming ownership of the ODJB name, brought back Eddie Edwards (and went after Larry Shields) to appear with the Original Dixieland Jazz Band in Sol Hurok's stage production Tropical Review in Forrest, New York. In 1944, a new version of "Tiger Rag" was released as V-Disc 214, featuring Edwards and Sbarbaro under the ODJB name; "Sensation Rag" also was released as V-Disc 214B2. V-Discs were non-commercial recordings issued only to the U.S. armed forces. In 1946 Tony Sbarbaro (now using the name Tony Spargo) led a new eight-man group, "The Emperors of Jazz", with ODJB alumnus Frank Signorelli on piano. J. Russel Robinson moved to California and continued to write songs, forming his own publishing company Southern California Music in 1952.

In 1960 the book, The Story of the Original Dixieland Jazz Band, was published. Writer H. O. Brunn based it on Nick LaRocca's recollections, which sometimes differ from that of other sources.

Of the veteran quintet, only Tony Sbarbaro lived to witness RCA Victor's commemoration of the 50th anniversary of the Original Dixieland Jazz Band. Larry Shields died in 1953, Nick LaRocca in 1961, Eddie Edwards and J. Russel Robinson in 1963, and Tony Sbarbaro in 1969.

Back in New Orleans, LaRocca licensed bandleader Phil Zito to use the ODJB name for many years. Nick LaRocca's son, Jimmy LaRocca, continues to lead bands under the name The Original Dixieland Jazz Band, which LaRocca the younger has trademarked.

== Influence ==
The ODJB was the first band to record jazz successfully, establishing and creating jazz as a new musical idiom and genre of music. Bix Beiderbecke was influenced by the ODJB to become a jazz musician and was heavily influenced by Nick LaRocca's cornet and trumpet style. Louis Armstrong acknowledged the importance of ODJB:

Only four years before I learned to play the trumpet in the Waif's Home, or in 1909, the first great jazz orchestra was formed in New Orleans by a cornet player named Dominick James LaRocca. They called him 'Nick' LaRocca. His orchestra had only five pieces but they were the hottest five pieces that had ever been known before. LaRocca named this band 'The Old Dixieland Jass Band'. He had an instrumentation different from anything before, an instrumentation that made the old songs sound new. Besides himself at the cornet, LaRocca had Larry Shields, clarinet, Eddie Edwards, trombone, Ragas, piano, and Sbarbaro, drums. They all came to be famous players and the Dixieland Band has gone down now in musical history.

— Louis Armstrong, Swing That Music, 1936

== Film appearances ==
In 1917, the band made the first appearance of a jazz band in a motion picture, a silent movie entitled, The Good for Nothing (1917), directed by Carlyle Blackwell, who also played the lead role as Jack Burkshaw. Written by Alexander Thomas, it also featured Evelyn Greeley and Kate Lester and was produced by William Brady. Nick LaRocca, Larry Shields, Tony Sbarbaro, and Henry Ragas appeared in the film as a band, with LaRocca on cornet, Shields on clarinet, Ragas on piano, and Sbarbaro on drums. The film was released on December 10, 1917, produced by Peerless Productions, and distributed by World Pictures.

Nick LaRocca and the reunited Original Dixieland Jass Band performed "Tiger Rag" in The March of Time newsreel segment titled "Birth of Swing", released to U.S. theaters on February 19, 1937.

== Music of ODJB ==
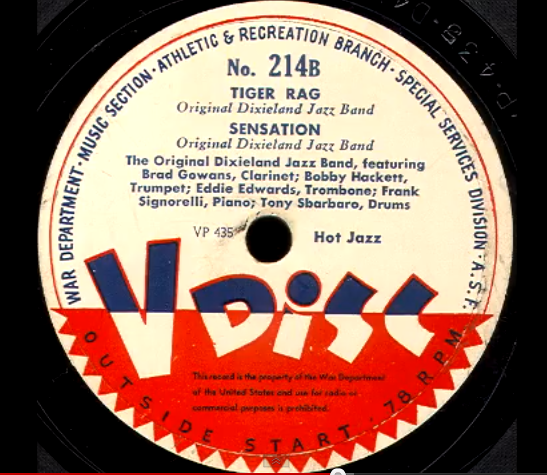
"Tiger Rag" and "Sensation" released on V Disc by the ODJB, No. 214B, VP 435, Hot Jazz, June, 1944, with Eddie Edwards and Tony Sbarbaro

=== "Tiger Rag" ===
Tiger Rag (1918)
The Original Dixieland Jass Band's 1918 recording of "Tiger Rag".

The band's 1917 composition "Tiger Rag" became one of the most popular and ubiquitous of jazz standards. There were 136 cover versions of ODJB's copyright jazz standard and classic "Tiger Rag" by 1942. It has been standard ever since.

Their first release, "Livery Stable Blues", featured instruments doing barnyard imitations and the fully loaded trap set, wood blocks, cowbells, gongs, and Chinese gourds. This musical innovation represented one of the first experimental exercises in jazz. At the time, their music was liberating; the barnyard sounds were experiments in altering the tonal qualities of the instruments, and clattering wood blocks broke up the rhythm. The music was very lively when compared to the pop music of the time.

Many of the tunes first composed and recorded by the Original Dixieland Jass Band, such as "Tiger Rag" and "Margie", were recorded by many of the major jazz bands and orchestras of the twentieth century, black and white. "Tiger Rag" was recorded by many artists, from Louis Armstrong to Duke Ellington to Glenn Miller to Benny Goodman. "Tiger Rag", in particular, became popular with many colleges and universities having a tiger as a mascot. In the biography John Coltrane: His Life and Music, published in 1999, Lewis Porter noted that ODJB's classic, "Margie", was a "specialty" of John Coltrane, a song he performed regularly in his early career. "Tiger Rag", "Margie", "Clarinet Marmalade", "At The Jazz Band Ball", "Sensation Rag", and "Fidgety Feet" remain much played classics in the repertory of contemporary Dixieland and traditional jazz bands. Their tunes were published as collaborations by some or all of the entire ensemble, including band leader Nick La Rocca.

The Eddie Edwards composition "Sensation Rag" (aka "Sensation") was performed at the 1938 landmark Benny Goodman jazz concert at Carnegie Hall released on the album The Famous 1938 Carnegie Hall Jazz Concert.

Compared to later jazz, the ODJB recordings have less technical improvisation in mostly ensemble tunes. Clarinetist Larry Shields is perhaps the most influential player, for he influence many modern day Jazz artists

Their concept of arrangement was somewhat limited, and their recordings can seem rather repetitive. The lack of a bass player is scarcely compensated for by the piano on their earlier, acoustically recorded sessions. Nonetheless, ODJB arrangements were wild, impolite, and definitely had a jazz feel, and that style still is referred to as the style of music known as Dixieland.

=== Covers ===
ODJB's songs were recorded by other musicians, such as Fletcher Henderson and His Orchestra, one of the most popular and influential jazz bands of the 1920s.

- "Beale Street Mama" – by J. Russel Robinson, recorded by Henderson in 1923 as an instrumental on Paramount.
- "Clarinet Marmalade" – recorded in 1926, released on Vocalion and Brunswick. In 1931, Henderson recorded a new version for Columbia.
- "Livery Stable Blues" – recorded in 1927, released on Columbia
- "Fidgety Feet" – by Nick LaRocca, recorded in 1927, released on Vocalion
- "Sensation" – recorded in 1927, released on Vocalion
- "Tiger Rag" – recorded in 1931, released on Crown
- "Aggravatin' Papa" – collaboration with Robinson, recorded in 1923 with Alberta Hunter on vocals
- "Singin' the Blues (Till My Daddy Comes Home)" – recorded in 1931 with Rex Stewart on cornet

Bix Beiderbecke recorded nine compositions associated with the ODJB from 1924 to 1930: "Fidgety Feet", his first recording in 1924, "Tiger Rag", "Sensation", "Lazy Daddy", "Ostrich Walk", "Clarinet Marmalade", "Singin' the Blues" with Frankie Trumbauer and Eddie Lang, "Margie", and "At the Jazz Band Ball".

== Discography ==
The band's seminal 78-rpm recordings include the following (on Victor, Columbia, and Aeolian Vocalion):

=== 1917–1920 ===
Dixieland Jass Band One-Step (1917)
The Original Dixieland Jass Band's 1921 recording of "Dixie Jass Band One-Step".

1. "Dixie Jass Band One-Step"/"Introducing That Teasin' Rag"/"Livery Stable Blues", 1917, Victor 18255. This was the second pressing. The original title of the A side was "Dixieland Jass Band One-Step".
2. "At the Jazz Band Ball"/"Barnyard Blues", 1917, Aeolian Vocalion A1205
3. "Ostrich Walk"/"Tiger Rag", 1917, Aeolian Vocalion A1206
4. "Reisenweber Rag/Look at 'Em Doing It Now", 1917, Aeolian Vocalion 1242
5. "Darktown Strutters' Ball"/"(Back Home Again in) Indiana", 1917, Columbia A2297; the ODJB recording of "Darktown Strutters' Ball" was inducted into the Grammy Hall of Fame on February 8, 2006
6. "At the Jazz Band Ball" (1918 version)/"Ostrich Walk" (1918 version), 1918, Victor 18457
7. "Skeleton Jangle"/"Tiger Rag" (1918 version), 1918, Victor 18472
8. "Bluin' the Blues"/"Sensation Rag", 1918, Victor 18483
9. "Mournin' Blues"/"Clarinet Marmalade", 1918, Victor 18513, "Mournin' Blues" also appeared as "Mornin' Blues" on some releases. The full B side title was "Clarinet Marmalade Blues".
10. "Fidgety Feet (War Cloud)"/"Lazy Daddy", 1918, Victor 18564
11. "Lasses Candy"/"Satanic Blues", 1919, Columbia 759
12. "Oriental Jazz" (or "Jass"), 1919, recorded November 24, 1917 and issued as Aeolian Vocalion 12097 in April 1919 with "Indigo Blues" by Ford Dabney's Band
13. "At the Jazz Band Ball" (1919 version)/"Barnyard Blues" (1919 version), 1919, recorded in London, England, April 16, 1919, English Columbia 735
14. "Soudan" (also known as "Oriental Jass" and "Oriental Jazz"), 1920, recorded in London, England, in May 1920 and released as English Columbia 829; was composed by Czech composer Gabriel Sebek in 1906 as "In the Soudan: A Dervish Chorus" or "Oriental Scene for Piano, Op. 45". The B side was "Me-Ow" by the London Dance Orchestra
15. "Margie"/"Singin' the Blues"/"Palesteena", 1920, Victor 18717
16. "Broadway Rose"/"Sweet Mama (Papa's Getting Mad)"/"Strut, Miss Lizzie", 1920, Victor 18722

Saint Louis Blues (1921)
The Original Dixieland Jass Band's 1921 recording of "Saint Louis Blues".

Jazz Me Blues (1921)
The Original Dixieland Jass Band's 1921 recording of "Jazz Me Blues".

=== 1921–1923 ===
1. "Home Again Blues"/"Crazy Blues"/"It's Right Here For You (If You Don't Get It, Tain't No Fault O' Mine)", 1921, Victor 18729
2. "Tell Me/Mammy o' Mine", 1921, recorded in the UK and released as Columbia 804
3. "I'm Forever Blowing Bubbles"/"My Baby's Arms", 1921, Columbia 805
4. "I've Lost My Heart in Dixieland"/"I've Got My Captain Working for Me Now", 1921, Columbia 815
5. "Sphinx/Alice Blue Gown", 1921, Columbia 824
6. "Jazz Me Blues/St. Louis Blues", 1921, Victor 18772
7. "Royal Garden Blues"/"Dangerous Blues", 1921, Victor 18798
8. "Bow Wow Blues (My Mama Treats Me Like a Dog)", 1922, Victor 18850. The B side was "Railroad Blues" by the Benson Orchestra of Chicago under pianist and composer Roy Bargy
9. "Toddlin' Blues"/"Some of These Days", 1923, Okeh 4738

=== Original Dixieland Jazz Band (led by Tony Sbarbaro) ===
1. "I'm Sittin' High on a Hilltop" (vocal by Terry Shand)/"I Live for Love" (vocal by Russ Morgan) 1935, Vocalion 3084
2. "You Stayed Away Too Long/Slipping Through My Fingers", 1935, Vocalion 3099

=== Nick LaRocca and the Original Dixieland Band ===
(LaRocca, Shields, Robinson, and Sbarbaro with orchestra)

1. "Tiger Rag"/"Bluin' the Blues", 1936, Victor 25403
2. "Clarinet Marmalade", 1936, Victor 25411-B, issued as a B-side opposite Benny Goodman's record "St. Louis Blues"
3. "Who Loves You?"/"Did You Mean It?", 1936, Victor 25420, vocals by Chris Fletcher
4. "Ostrich Walk"/"Toddlin' Blues", 1936, Victor 25460
5. "Fidgety Feet", 1936, Victor 25668-B. Unreleased until 1937, when it was issued as a B-side opposite Ray Noble's record "Vieni, Vieni"
6. "Old Joe Blade", 1936, Victor 26039-B, vocal by J. Russel Robinson. Unreleased until 1938, when it was issued as a B-side opposite Lionel Hampton's record "Any Time at All".

=== The Original Dixieland Five ===
(reunion of the 1919 quintet: LaRocca, Shields, Edwards, Robinson, and Sbarbaro)

1. "Original Dixieland One-Step/Barnyard Blues" (new version of "Livery Stable Blues"), 1936, Victor 25502
2. "Tiger Rag"/"Skeleton Jangle", 1936, Victor 25524
3. "Clarinet Marmalade"/"Bluin' the Blues", 1936, Victor 25525

=== Original Dixieland Jazz Band with Shields, Edwards, and Sbarbaro; vocals by Lola Bard ===
1. "oooOO-Oh! Boom!"/"Please Be Kind", 1938, Bluebird B-7442
2. "Good-Night, Sweet Dreams, Good-Night"/"In My Little Red Book", 1938, Bluebird B-7444
3. "Drop a Nickel in the Slot"/"Jezebel", 1938, Bluebird B-7454

=== Later recordings ===
1. "Tiger Rag" (1943 version), 1944, V-Disc 214B1, issued June, 1944, with Eddie Edwards and Tony Sbarbaro
2. "Sensation" (1943 version), 1944, V-Disc 214B2, with Eddie Edwards and Tony Sbarbaro
3. "Shake It and Break It"/"When You and I Were Young, Maggie", 1946, Commodore C-613

=== Soundtracks ===
The soundtrack album to the 2011 Boardwalk Empire series on HBO includes performances of three songs recorded by the Original Dixieland Jazz Band: "Livery Stable Blues", "Mournin' Blues", and "Margie", performed by Vince Giordano and the Nighthawks Orchestra. The soundtrack won the Grammy Award for Best Compilation Soundtrack for Visual Media at the 54th Grammy Awards.

== Honors ==
In 1977, the ODJB classic "Singin' the Blues", co-written by ODJB pianist J. Russel Robinson, was inducted into the Grammy Hall of Fame in a landmark 1927 recording by Frankie Trumbauer and His Orchestra featuring Bix Beiderbecke on cornet and Eddie Lang on guitar, as Okeh 40772-B, recorded on February 4, 1927.

On April 3, 1992, the City Council of New Orleans issued a proclamation honoring the members of the band. In 2003, the 1918 ODJB recording of "Tiger Rag" was placed on the U.S. Library of Congress National Recording Registry. In 2006, the Original Dixieland Jazz Band's recording of "Darktown Strutters' Ball", released in 1917 as Columbia single A2297, was inducted into the Grammy Hall of Fame.

The Original Dixieland Jazz Band was posthumously inducted into the Grammy Hall of Fame, which is a special Grammy award established in 1973 to honor recordings that are at least 25 years old and that have "qualitative or historical significance".

Original Dixieland Jazz Band: Grammy Hall of Fame Awards
Year Recorded	Title	Genre	Label	Year Inducted	Notes
1917	"Darktown Strutters' Ball"	Jazz (single)	Columbia	2006	
