= Alcide Nunez =

American jazz clarinetist (1884-1934)

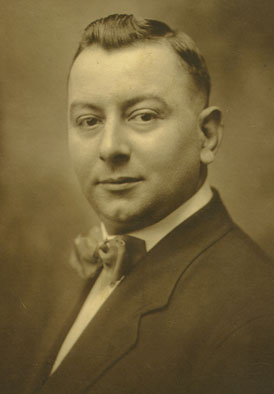
- Nunez in 1918

Background information
- Born: Alcide Patrick Nunez; March 17, 1884; St. Bernard Parish, Louisiana, U.S.
- Died: September 2, 1934 (aged 50) New Orleans, Louisiana, U.S.
- Genres: Jazz
- Occupation: Musician
- Instrument: Clarinet
- Years active: 1902–1934

Alcide Patrick Nunez (March 17, 1884 – September 2, 1934), also known as Yellow Nunez and Al Nunez, was an American jazz clarinetist. He was one of the first musicians of New Orleans to make audio recordings.

== Biography ==
Alcide Patrick Nunez was born in St. Bernard Parish, Louisiana, United States. His parents were Victor Nunez and Elisa Nunez Chalaire and were of Isleño and French Creole descent respectively. The family moved to New Orleans when he was a child.

He grew up amid the Marigny and Bywater districts of New Orleans. For a time, Nunez lived at 1340 Arts Street in the St. Roch neighborhood of New Orleans. Nunez joined to several bands in which played guitar, although switched to clarinet about 1902. He soon became one of the top hot clarinetists in the city. By 1905 he was a regular in Papa Jack Laine's band, in addition to playing with Tom Brown and sometimes leading bands of his own. Nunez could play several instruments, but mainly played the clarinet. In addition, he was able to improvise variations on the songs he heard. Before he was able to make music a full-time profession, Nunez worked for a while driving a mule-drawn wagon with fellow musician "Chink" Martin Abraham.

In early 1916, he went north to Chicago with Stein's Dixie Jass Band, which was to become famous as the Original Dixieland Jass Band, but Nunez left the band shortly before they made their first recordings. In 1917 the Dixieland Jass Band achieved great success with their recording of the instrumental "Livery Stable Blues" under the direction of Nick LaRocca; however, Nunez and Ray Lopez filed copyright for a sheet music version of the tune before LaRocca. Nick LaRocca and the band sued Nunez for $10,000. In the end the lawsuit was thrown out without decision; the judge denied that any "musicians" who could not read written music could be said to have written anything.

After some time playing with Tom Brown's band in Chicago, he went to New York City with Bert Kelly's band. Pee Wee Russell announced in Chicago and New York that Nunez was the greatest jazz clarinetist in the world. Nunez became Kelly's bandleader. After playing with Kelly through 1918, at the start of 1919 Nunez helped form the band the Louisiana Five, led by drummer Anton Lada. They became one of the most popular bands in New York and recorded for several record labels. In early 1920 Nunez worked with the New York dance band of Harry Yerkes but in the same year returned temporarily to the Louisiana Five, touring the United States.

In 1922, after Bert Kelly replaced him with Johnny Dodds, he returned to Chicago to lead the house band at Kelly's Stables, one of the city's top nightclubs and played with the band of Willard Robison. Soon thereafter Nuñez began to lose his teeth, impairing his ability to play clarinet. He returned to his family in New Orleans, but after getting dentures he regained his ability to play the clarinet. He joined the police department to join the Police Band. During this time, Nunez was also part of "The Moonlight Serenaders" band and of several dance bands that played in New Orleans. He remained in New Orleans until his death.

== Personal life ==
Nunez married three times, had one child with his second wife and three children with his third. For a time in 1921, he settled in Baltimore, where he bought a large house. He died of a heart attack on September 2, 1934. His Great grandson Robert Victor Nunez III is the principal tuba player with the Louisiana Philharmonic Orchestra of New Orleans, Louisiana since 1991. Robert also plays traditional jazz in and around New Orleans and has performed in Germany, Switzerland, and Azerbaijan.
