= Henry Ragas =

Musical artist (1890–1919)

Henry Walter Ragas
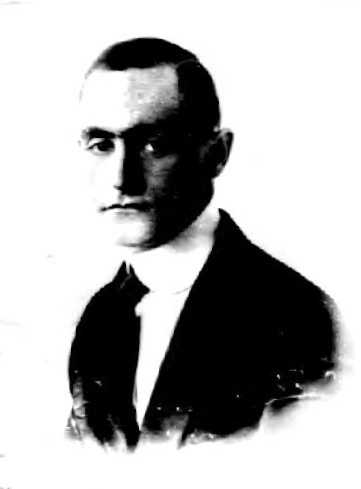

Background information
- Born: Henry Walter Ragas; November 2, 1890; Pointe à la Hache, Louisiana, U.S.
- Died: February 18, 1919 (aged 28) New York City, U.S.
- Genres: Jazz
- Occupation: Musician
- Instrument: Piano
- Years active: 1910–1919
- Formerly of: Original Dixieland Jazz Band

Henry Walter Ragas (November 2, 1890 – February 18, 1919) was a jazz pianist who was a member of the Original Dixieland Jazz Band, the first jazz band to record commercially.

== Background ==
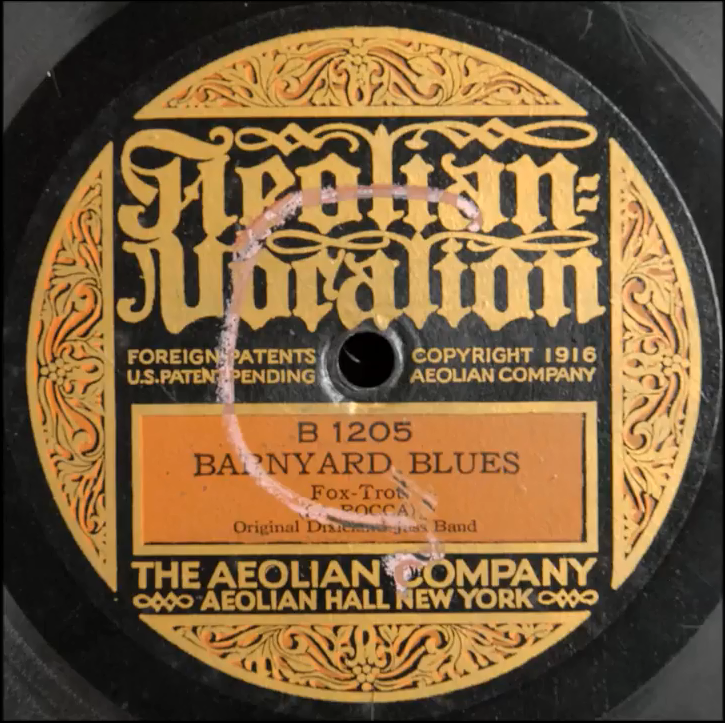
1917 release of "Barnyard Blues" ("Livery Stable Blues") by the Original Dixieland Jass Band

He played piano with the Original Dixieland Jass Band on their earliest recording sessions. As such, he is the very first jazz pianist to be recorded (not counting piano rolls), although his contributions are barely audible due to the primitive recording equipment available. His role in the band was to fill out the chords and to provide a bass line. He did not play solos on the recordings.

Ragas gained experience as a solo pianist during the period from 1910 to 1913. He traveled with Johnny Stein's band to Chicago in 1916 and left the group to form the Original Dixieland Jazz Band, the first jazz group to record. Ragas was on the band's first 21 recordings, including "Bluin' the Blues", which he composed. He also wrote "Lazy Daddy", "Dixieland Jass Band One-Step", "Clarinet Marmalade Blues", and "Reisenweber Rag".

He played on many Original Dixieland Jass Band classics and standards such as "Livery Stable Blues", regarded as the first jazz recording; "Tiger Rag", one of the most recorded songs in jazz history; and "Clarinet Marmalade", "Fidgety Feet", "At the Jazz Band Ball", "Sensation Rag", "Bluin' the Blues", and "Dixieland Jass Band One-Step".

He died in the Spanish flu pandemic of 1919. He was replaced by J. Russel Robinson.

== Grammy Hall of Fame ==
"Darktown Strutters' Ball" (1917) by Original Dixieland Jass Band was inducted into the Grammy Hall of Fame in 2006.
