= The Belgrade Dixieland Orchestra =

Jazz orchestra

- Origin: Belgrade, Serbia
- Genres: Dixieland; Traditional Jazz; Jazz
- Years active: 2001–
- Labels: PGP-RTB, B.M.W. GmbH
- Members: Vladimir Racković; Sava Matić; Miloš Milosavljević; Ivan Maksimović; Aleksandar Miletić; Veljko Klenkovski; Aleksandra Bijelić; Nemanja Zlatarev
- Past members: Ljubomir Matijaca; Ivan Švager; Dimitrije D. Vasiljević; Aleksandar Petrović; Jelena Bračika; Branko Popović; Bobana Đorđević; Bodin Draškoci; Vukašin Marković
- Website: www.belgradedixielandorchestra.com

The Belgrade Dixieland Orchestra, (BDO) founded in Belgrade in 2001, is one of the best-known and most popular jazz orchestras in Serbia. It has evolved from the original Ljubomir Matijaca Dixieland Band, which was the only group of this musical orientation in Serbia in the last decades of the 20th century.

In October 2010, BDO was awarded one of the most important and prestigious social honours by being included in the official Music Textbook for Primary Schools (8th grade) in the lesson on Serbian jazz.

== Band history ==
The doyen of Serbian Jazz and the experienced trombone player, Ljubomir Matijaca, was the founder of the Belgrade Dixieland Orchestra and its first art director. He was greatly appreciated for his precise style directions and definition of the musical expression of the Orchestra. In addition, Ivan Svager, the saxophone player, arranger and composer contributed immeasurably to the formation and development of the band's unique and recognizable sound. His arrangements still provide the framework for most of the compositions performed by the Orchestra.

In 2005 the Orchestra initiated the jazz festival named "The Jazz Birthday" which is still traditionally organized on 26 February. On this day in 1917, the first gramophone record with the jazz sound was published.

By the end of 2007, the role of art director was inherited by Vladimir Rackovic, the banjo player, singer, arranger and music producer of the Orchestra. He gave a new dimension and a new role to the group, directing the whole concert and discography mission into the research and education spheres. This was proved by several hundred educational concerts entitled "That's How Jazz Was Born", held all over Serbia. These concerts continue to be arranged to this day.

Having worked on arrangements and repertoire building for two years, during which the Orchestra performed in clubs, it made its official debut at the Valjevo Jazz Festival concert on 9 May 2003. Since then, BDO as performed exclusively as a concert orchestra.

Shortly afterwards, and in accordance with its ambition to popularize jazz, the Orchestra formed its attractive dance group, "The Dixie Dance Show", which complements the music of the concerts by presenting the Charleston, Cakewalk, Black Bottom and all other dances from the beginning of the 20th century which are rarely seen nowadays. At first with its choreographer Irena Zujovic, and later with Jelena Lazic, The Dixie Dance Show has been making BDO unique as it is the one and only jazz orchestra in the region with its permanent dance troupe. Concert spectacles with as many as 20 artists on the stage performed by the BDO and DDS have been absolutely unique to the jazz scenes in this part of Europe.

== Participation in festivals ==
BDO concerts abroad:

- “Ragtime & Jazz Festival”, Kecskemet, Hungary, 24 March 2006
- “Jazzdagar“ jazz festival, Nortalje, Sweden, 30 June 2006
- “Miskolc Dixieland festival”, Miskolc, Hungary, 1 July 2006
- “Colloseum“, Sarajevo, BIH, 1 September 2006, 23 and 24 February 2007
- “Jazz festival Bansko“, Bansko, Bulgaria, 12 August 2008
- “Croatia“ Cavtat, Croatia, 25 March 2009
- “Petrovac Jazz fest“, Petrovac, Montenegro, 3 September 2009
- “Dresden International Dixieland Festival“, Dresden, Germany, 20, 21 and 22 May 2011
- “Jazz in the Cave“ jazz festival, Sancerre, France, 1 and 2 July 2011
- “European University Cyprus“, Nicosia, Cyprus, 27 October 2012
- “Hot club of Rouen“, Rouen, France, 11 October 2013
- “Akzent theater“, Vienna, Austria, 22 May 2014
- “Kototr Art“ festival, Kotor, Montenegro, 10 and 11 August 2015

== Discography ==
- BELGRADE DIXIELAND ORCHESTRA (2004. PGP RTS)
- MOON OVER BOURBON STREET (2006. PGP RTS)
- JAZZ MUSEUM (2008. PGP RTS)
- WHAT A DIXIE WE HAVE IN GOSPEL (2010. B.M.W. GmbH)
- NATIONAL TREASURE (2012. B.M.W. GmbH)
- ALL THAT JASS (2015. B.M.W. GmbH)
