= Nick LaRocca =

American jazz cornetist and trumpeter (1889–1961)

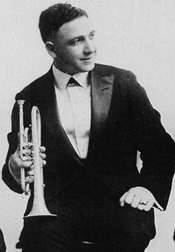

Background information
- Born: Dominic James La Rocca; April 11, 1889; New Orleans, Louisiana, United States
- Died: February 22, 1961 (aged 71)
- Genres: Dixieland, jazz
- Occupations: Musician, bandleader
- Instruments: Cornet, trumpet
- Years active: 1912–59
- Labels: Victor, Okeh, Vocalion, Columbia, Southland
- Formerly of: Original Dixieland Jass Band

Dominic James "Nick" LaRocca (April 11, 1889 – February 22, 1961), was an American early jazz cornetist and trumpeter and the leader of the Original Dixieland Jass Band, who is credited by some as being "the father of modern jazz". He is the composer of one of the most recorded jazz classics of all-time, "Tiger Rag". He was part of what is generally regarded as the first recorded jazz band, a band which recorded and released the first jazz recording, "Livery Stable Blues" in 1917.

== Background ==
Nick LaRocca was born in New Orleans, Louisiana, the son of Sicilian immigrants. His father was Girolamo LaRocca of Salaparuta, Sicily and his mother was Vita De Nina of Poggioreale, Sicily. Young Nick was attracted to the music of the brass bands in New Orleans and covertly taught himself to play cornet against the wishes of his father who hoped his son would go into a more prestigious profession. LaRocca at first worked as an electrician, playing music on the side.

From around 1910 through 1916 he was a regular member of Papa Jack Laine's bands. While not considered as one of the most virtuosic or creative of the Laine players, he was well regarded for playing a solid lead with a strong lip which allowed him to play long parades without let up or to play several gigs in a row on the same day.

In 1916 he was chosen as a last-minute replacement for Frank Christian in Johnny Stein's band to play a job up in Chicago, Illinois. This band became the famous Original Dixieland Jazz Band, making the first commercially issued jazz recordings in New York City in 1917. These recordings were hits and made the band into celebrities.

Soon other New Orleans musicians began following the O.D.J.B.'s path, arriving in New York to play jazz. LaRocca was uneasy about competition. Frank Christian recalled that LaRocca offered him $200 and a return railway ticket to go back home. After a band featuring New Orleans musicians Alcide Nunez, Tom Brown, and Ragbaby Stevens won a battle of the bands against the O.D.J.B., drummer Ragbaby found his drum heads mysteriously slashed.

The band gave LaRocca the nickname "Joe Blade", and published a song called "Joe Blade, Sharp as a Tack".

LaRocca led this band on tours of England and the United States into the early 1920s, when he suffered a nervous breakdown. He returned to New Orleans and retired from music, going into the construction and contracting business. His chair in the band was taken by Henry Levine, a teenage trumpeter devoted to traditional jazz stylings. Levine later led one of the house bands on NBC's radio series The Chamber Music Society of Lower Basin Street.

In 1936 Nick LaRocca reunited the ODJB for a successful tour and more recordings. LaRocca proclaimed that he and his band were the inventors of the now nationally popular swing music. He and the reunited Original Dixieland Jazz Band performed "Tiger Rag" in The March of Time newsreel segment titled "Birth of Swing," released to U.S. theaters February 19, 1937. Personality conflicts broke up the band again in 1937, and LaRocca again retired from music. He died in New Orleans in 1961.

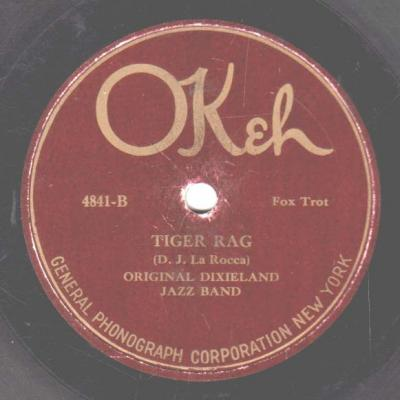
1923 release of "Tiger Rag" by the Original Dixieland Jazz Band as an Okeh 78 single, 4841B.

== Later life and controversy ==
In the 1950s, he wrote numerous vehement letters to newspapers, radio, and television shows, stating that he was the true and sole inventor of jazz music, damaging his credibility and provoking a backlash against him and his reputation and career.

When Tulane University established their Archive of New Orleans Jazz, now the Hogan Jazz Archive, in 1958, LaRocca donated his large collection of items related to the O.D.J.B. to Tulane, including several scrapbooks made by LaRocca.

At the same time, he worked with writer H.O. Brunn on the book The Story of the Original Dixieland Jazz Band. In the book, LaRocca claimed that he founded the Original Dixieland Jass Band in 1908. The book was dismissive of the other members of the O.D.J.B. It was perhaps kindest to clarinetist Larry Shields.

A balanced assessment would have to acknowledge that LaRocca was an important figure in taking jazz from a regional style to international popularity, the leader of the most influential jazz band of the period from 1917 to 1921, and a good player in a very early jazz style on records such as "Clarinet Marmalade". LaRocca's playing and recordings were an important early influence on such later jazz trumpeters as Red Nichols, Bix Beiderbecke and Phil Napoleon. LaRocca's 1917 composition "Tiger Rag" was covered by Louis Armstrong in several different versions throughout his career, while Duke Ellington, Art Tatum, and The Mills Brothers also recorded important and influential cover versions of the jazz standard.

== Honors ==
In 2006, his 1917 recording of "Darktown Strutters' Ball" with the Original Dixieland Jass Band was inducted into the Grammy Hall of Fame.

== See also ==
- Italians in New Orleans

== Sources ==
- The ODJB on RedHotJazz Contains .ram files of their vintage recordings.
- Jimmy LaRocca's Original Dixieland Jazz Band
- Stewart, Jack. "The Original Dixieland Jazz Band's Place in the Development of Jazz." New Orleans International Music Colloquium, 2005.
- Lange, Horst H. Wie der Jazz begann: 1916–1923, von der "Original Dixieland Jazz Band" bis zu King Olivers "Creole Jazz Band". Berlin: Colloquium Verlag, 1991. ISBN 3-7678-0779-3
- Brunn, H.O. The Story of the Original Dixieland Jazz Band. Baton Rouge: Louisiana State University Press, 1960. Reprinted by Da Capo Press, 1977. ISBN 0-306-70892-2
- Mugno, Salvatore. Il biografo di Nick LaRocca. Come entrare nelle storie del jazz. Lecce, Italy: Besa Editrice, Nardò, 2005.
