= Darktown Strutters' Ball =

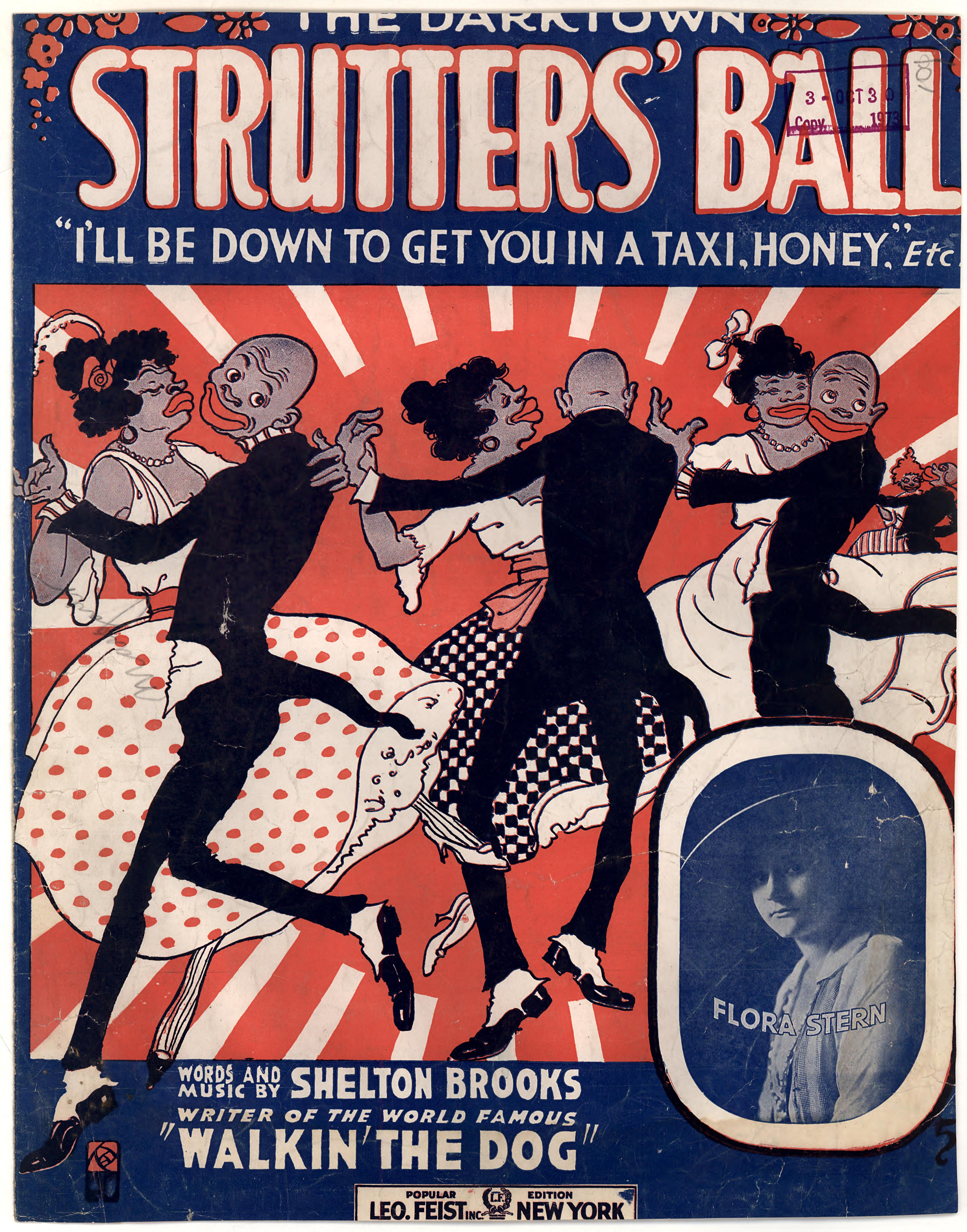

Single by Original Dixieland Jazz Band
- Published: 1917 by Will Rossiter
- Released: 1917
- Recorded: May 30, 1917
- Genre: Jazz
- Label: Columbia
- Songwriter: Shelton Brooks

"Darktown Strutters' Ball" is a popular song by Shelton Brooks, published in 1917. The song has been recorded many times and is considered a popular and jazz standard. There are many variations of the title, including "At the Darktown Strutters' Ball", "The Darktown Strutters' Ball", and just "Strutters' Ball".

== History ==
Soon after its 1917 publication, "Darktown Strutters' Ball" was included by Sophie Tucker in her Vaudeville routine. The song was recorded on May 9 that year by the Six Brown Brothers. The best-known recording, by the Original Dixieland Jazz Band, which was recorded on May 30, 1917, and released by Columbia Records as catalog number A-2297, was inducted into the Grammy Hall of Fame in 2006.

The song is very obviously a stylistic generic copy of the 1914 British hit by Nat D. Ayer entitled "At The Foxtrot Ball, That's All"

More than three million copies of the sheet music were sold.

== Recorded versions ==
- American Republic Band (recorded December 1917, released by Pathé Records as catalog number 20282, with the flip side "Homeward Bound")
- The Dave Brubeck Quartet recorded the song in 1960 on their album Southern Scene, released by Columbia Records.
- James Reese Europe's 369th U.S. Infantry "Harlem Hellfighters" Band recorded the song in 1919.
- Ray Anthony in Australia on Capitol CP-139, flip side "Deep Night" and in the US as the flip side to the single "Count Every Star".
- Allen Broome & His Dixieland All-Stars released a version on his debut solo album BucketMouth in June, 2013.
- Boswell Sisters recorded a version (complete with a rumba section!) on May 23, 1934, in New York but was only issued in Australia on Columbia DO-1255.
- Pete Fountain in 1960 on Mr. New Orleans Meets Mr. Honky Tonk Coral CRL 57334 with Big Tiny Little, in 1962 on Dixieland (Live Performance In New Orleans) RCA Camden CAL 727, and in 1963 on South Rampart Street Parade Coral CRL 57440
- Joe Brown on Decca F 11207, 1960, flip side "Swagger"; this was Brown's first single to chart.
- The Brown Dots (released by Manor Records as catalog number 1166, with the flip side "As Tho' You Don't Know").
- Phil Brito (released by MGM Records as catalog number 11687, with the flip side "Memories of Sorrento")
- Castle Jazz Band (recorded January 11, 1949, released by Castle Records as catalog number 3, with the flip side "Kansas City Stomps")
- Larry Clinton and Orchestra (vocal by Sylvia Syms and the Carillons; recorded January 1954, released by Bell Records as catalog number 1035, with the flip side "Answer Me, My Love")
- Arthur Collins & Byron G. Harlan (recorded December 1917, released by Columbia Records as catalog number A-2478, with the flip side "I'm All Bound Round with the Mason Dixon Line")
- Bing Crosby included the song in a medley on his album On the Happy Side (1962).
- Jimmy Dorsey Orchestra with June Richmond; (released by Coral Records as catalog number 60000, with the flip side "Dusk in Upper Sandusky")
- Arthur Fields (released by Pathe Records as catalog number 20315B, with the flip side "In the Land o' Yamo Yamo")
- James Gelfand made a version for the Canadian movie Jack Paradise (Les nuits de Montréal) (2004).
- Connie Haines, Alan Dale, the Ray Bloch Seven, and Sy Oliver's Orchestra (released by Signature Records as catalog number 15197A, with the flip side "Little Boy Blues"
- Phil Harris and his Orchestra (recorded February 27, 1937, released by Vocalion Records as catalog number 3565, with the flip side "Between the Devil and the Deep Blue Sea")
- Hoosier Hotshots (recorded December 16, 1935, released by Vocalion Records as catalog number 03734, with the flip side "Nobody's Sweetheart"; re-recorded February 26, 1936, released by Conqueror Records as catalog number 8661, with the flip side "You're Driving Me Crazy")
- Pee Wee Hunt (released by Capitol Records as catalog number 1691, with the flip side "Oh!" and as catalog number 1741, with the flip side "Basin Street Blues")
- Alberta Hunter recorded the song on her 1978 comeback album Amtrak Blues (on Columbia). (The album was inducted into the Blues Hall of Fame in 2009.)
- Brown & Terry Jazzola Boys (recorded June 1921, released by OKeh Records as catalog number 8006B, with the flip side "Hesitatin' Blues".
- Jaudas' Society Orchestra issued a version in 1918 on Edison Records.
- Martin & Brown ("The Harmonica Duo") (released by Tennessee Records as catalog number 793, with the flip side "I'll See You in My Dreams")
- Lou Monte recorded "Darktown Strutter's Ball (Italian Syle)" in 1954. The RCA release was a major hit, reaching No. 12 on retail sales. He parodies the lyrics, including "I'll be down to get you in a pushcart honey", and asks "Are you from Lyndhurst?", the city of his birth.
- Russ Morgan and his Orchestra (recorded December 21, 1953, released by Decca Records as catalog number 29032, with the flip side "There'll Be Some Changes Made")
- Ruby Newman and his Orchestra (recorded January 21, 1939, released by Decca Records as catalog number 23621, with the flip side "I'm Just Wild about Harry")
- Original Dixieland Jazz Band (recorded May 30, 1917, released by Columbia Records as catalog number A-2297, with the flip side "Indiana One Step"[6]). The ODJB recording was inducted into the Grammy Hall of Fame in 2006.
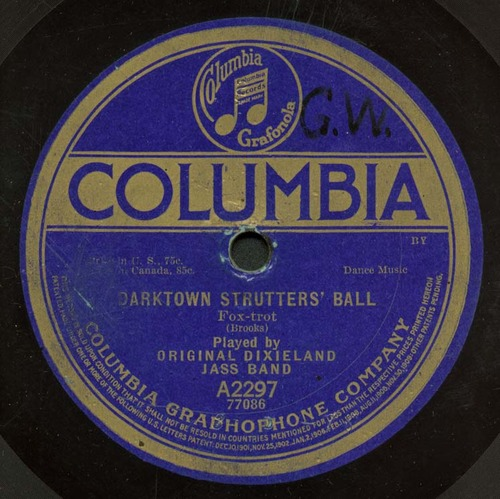
  Columbia 78, A2297, Original Dixieland Jass Band, 1917.
- Orlando's Orchestra (recorded January 1920, released by Silvertone Records as catalog number 5007B, with the flip side "Missouri Waltz". This version was also released, with the name of the orchestra given as the Federal Band, by Federal Records under the same catalog number, with the same flip side)
- Preacher Rollo and the Five Saints (Recorded April 18, 1951, in Miami, released by MGM Records as catalog number 30448B, with the flip side "Original Dixieland One-Step")
- The Six Brown Brothers, a comedic musical ensemble, recorded the song in 1917.
- Gid Tanner's Skillet Lickers (recorded March 29, 1927, released by Columbia Records as catalog number 15188D, with the flip side "Drink 'Er Down")
- Toots' Quartet (released by Decca Records as catalog number 28157, with the flip side "Toselli Jump")
- Fats Waller (recorded November 3, 1939, originally released by Bluebird Records as catalog number 10573B, with the flip side "I Can't Give You Anything but Love, Baby")
- Chick Webb recorded a version on January 15, 1934, in New York but was only issued in England on Columbia CB-754.
- The Ted Mulry Gang released a rock 'n' roll version of the song catalog number Albert AP11004, produced by Ted Albert in Australia, in February 1976, reaching no. 3 on the Kent Music Report.
- The Beatles performed "Darktown Strutters' Ball" in their early Liverpool and Hamburg performances, though no recording has ever surfaced.
- Bob Wills and the Texas Playboys 1940s.

== In popular culture ==
- "The Darktown Strutters' Ball" was the squadron tune of the RFC's elite No. 56 Squadron during the later stages of the First World War.
- Tom and Jerry 1950 animated cartoon Saturday Evening Puss - Background music as Mammy Two Shoes gets ready for an evening out.
- Bing Crosby and Nicole Maurey sang the song in the 1953 film Little Boy Lost.
- In a 1975 episode of The Mary Tyler Moore Show ("Edie Gets Married"; Season 6, Episode 1) as the answer to a "knock-knock" joke: Knock-knock / Who's there? / Anna Maria Alberghetti / Anna Maria Alberghetti Who? / (sung) "Anna Maria Alberghetti in a taxi, Honey..." (similar to the first line of the song).
- The tune features in the 1971 Vincent Price horror film The Abominable Dr. Phibes.
- Robert Redford is singing it as he gets ill by the piano in the 1984 movie The Natural.
- Kristin Scott Thomas sings a portion of it to Ralph Fiennes as they are driving through the desert in 1996 film The English Patient.
- Abe Simpson sings it while getting ready for his date with Beatrice in the "Old Money" episode of The Simpsons.
- The opening lines of the song are quoted on the rear cover of The Band's eponymous 1969 album.
- In the premiere episode of the TV series M*A*S*H (1971), it is background music (sung in Japanese) during a party scene.
- Performed by Anissa Jones and Pepe Brown in the Elvis movie The Trouble with Girls.
- Performed by Antoinette Brown (portrayed by Maura G Hooper) in episode 3 of AMC's Interview with the Vampire (2022)
- Played by a dance band at the Summer Ball in the 1954 novel Lucky Jim, by Kingsley Amis.

== See also ==
- List of pre-1920 jazz standards
