= Tony Sbarbaro =

American drummer

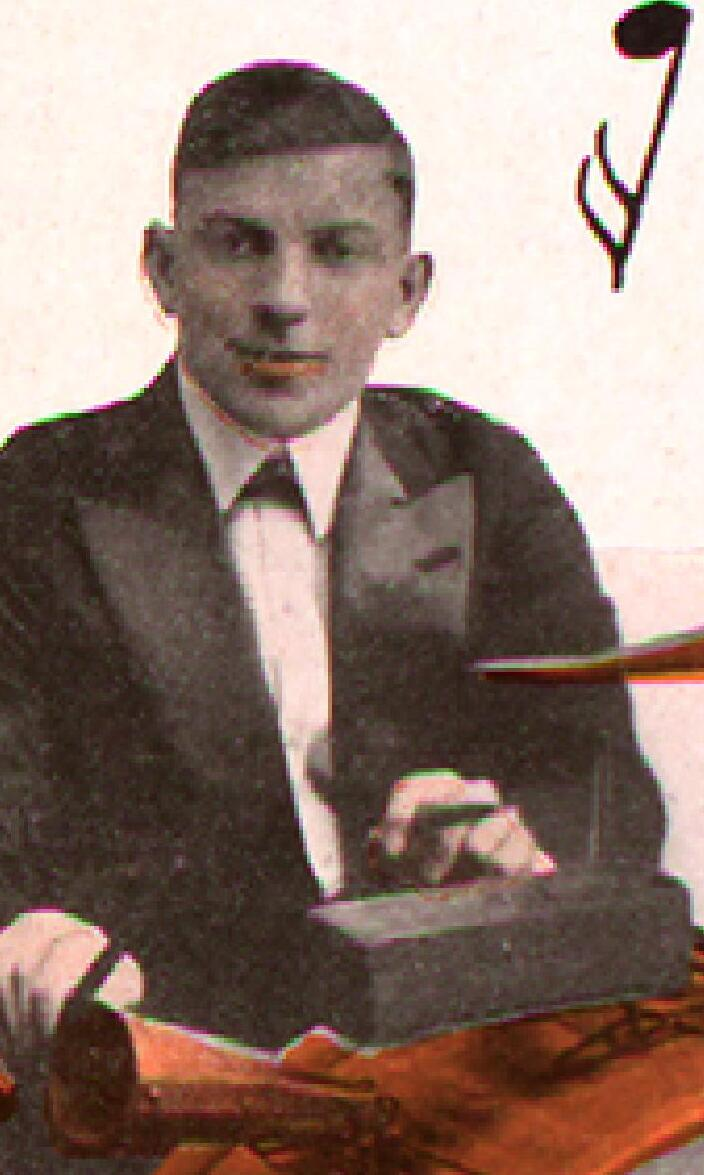
- Tony Sbarbaro on printed sheet music

Background information
- Born: June 27, 1897; New Orleans, Louisiana, U.S.
- Died: October 30, 1969 (aged 72) New York City, U.S.
- Genres: Jazz
- Occupation: Musician
- Instrument: Drummer
- Formerly of: Original Dixieland Jazz Band

Antonio Sparbaro, known professionally as Tony Sbarbaro or Tony Spargo (June 27, 1897 – October 30, 1969) was an American jazz drummer associated with New Orleans jazz. He was the Original Dixieland Jazz Band drummer for over 50 years.

== Background ==
Sbarbaro was born in New Orleans, Louisiana, United States, to an immigrant Genoa or Genovese family. Early in his career he played with the Frayle Brothers Band (possibly as early as 1911) and the Reliance Band of Papa Jack Laine. He did side work with Merritt Brunies and Carl Randall.

He joined the Original Dixieland Jazz Band for their initial recordings in 1917; and became its leader in 1925 and remained a member of the ensemble until its dissolution in the 1960s, being the only founding member still in the group at that time. Sbarbaro also composed for the group, writing the tune "Mourning Blues" among others.

He remained a fixture of Dixieland jazz performance for most of his life, playing later in life in New Orleans with Miff Mole, Big Chief Moore, Pee Wee Erwin, and Eddie Condon. He played at the New York World's Fair in 1941 and with Connee Boswell in the 1950s. He left music in the 1960s due to the popularity of rock and roll, and died in October 1969, in New York City, at the age of 72.

== Drumming techniques ==
"Oriental Jazz" released on Aeolian Vocalion in 1919

Sbarbaro's drum set had a number of nonstandard qualities. He employed wood blocks, cowbells, and Chinese tom-toms, and used a custom arrangement for his bass and snare drum. He used the technique known as "double-drumming", hitting the bass drum with the butt end of the drum stick. Sbarbaro even put stuffed animals inside drums to change their sound. He also had a kazoo attached to his set, providing some of the band's sound effects.

== Grammy Hall of Fame ==
"Darktown Strutters' Ball" (1917) by Original Dixieland Jass Band was inducted into the Grammy Hall of Fame in 2006
