= Larry Shields =

American jazz clarinetist (1893-1953)

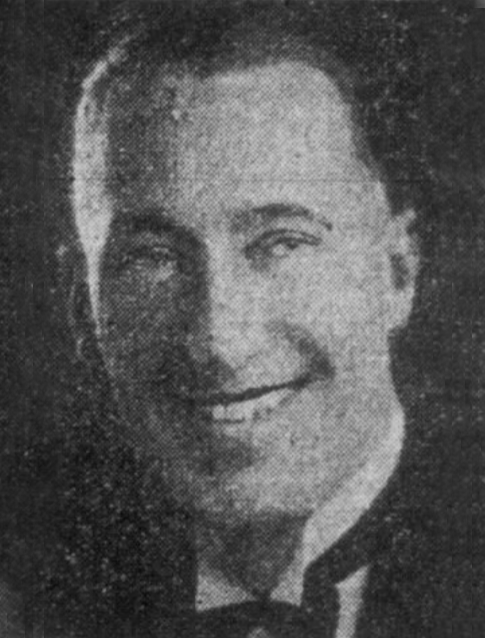
- Shields, c. 1924

Background information
- Born: Lawrence James Shields; September 13, 1893; New Orleans, Louisiana, U.S.
- Died: November 21, 1953 (aged 60) Los Angeles, California, U.S.
- Genres: Jazz
- Occupation: Musician
- Instrument: Clarinet
- Formerly of: Original Dixieland Jazz Band
- Relatives: Harry Shields (brother)

Lawrence James Shields (September 13, 1893 – November 21, 1953) was an early American dixieland jazz clarinetist. He was a member of the Original Dixieland Jazz Band, the first jazz band to record commercially.

== Background ==
Shields was born into an Irish-American family in Uptown New Orleans, on the same block where jazz pioneer Buddy Bolden lived. Shields' family were musical; his brothers Harry, Pat (guitar), and Eddie (piano) all played music professionally.

Shields started playing clarinet when he was 14 and played with Papa Jack Laine's bands. He was one of the early New Orleans musicians to go to Chicago, first heading north in the summer of 1915 to join Bert Kelly's band, then with Tom Brown's band, before joining the Original Dixieland Jass Band (ODJB) in November 1916. The following year that band made the first jazz phonograph records, propelling Shields' playing to national prominence. Around this time, he also played occasionally with King Watzke's band.

After leaving the ODJB in 1921, he played with various bands in New York City (including briefly with Paul Whiteman) before moving to Los Angeles, California where he remained throughout the 1920s, leading his own band and appearing briefly in some Hollywood films.

In the 1930s, Shields returned to Chicago and joined the reformed ODJB. He then worked for a while at "Nick's" in New York before returning to play in New Orleans and, later, in California. He died in Los Angeles in 1953.

== Influence ==
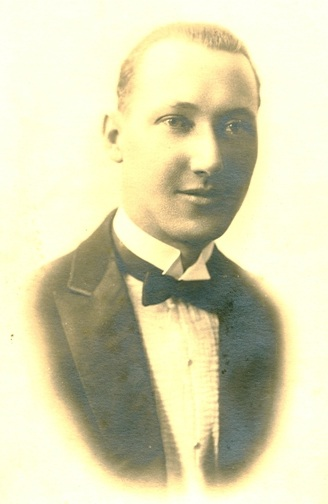
Shields in 1916

His playing, especially on phonograph records, was an important influence on later jazz clarinetists, including Benny Goodman. Larry Shields inspired Dink Johnson to begin playing the clarinet, in a 1950 interview with Floyd Levin he stated: "I was actually a drummer, you know. I had always wanted to play the clarinet since hearing Larry Shields with the Original Dixieland Jazz Band."

He co-wrote the ODJB classics "Clarinet Marmalade" with Henry Ragas and "At the Jazz Band Ball", "Ostrich Walk", and "Fidgety Feet" with Nick LaRocca. These compositions became jazz classics and standards that were re-recorded by later jazz bands.

== Honors ==
In 2006, his 1917 recording of "Darktown Strutters' Ball" with the Original Dixieland Jass Band was inducted into the Grammy Hall of Fame.

== See also ==
- Original Dixieland Jass Band
