= 1917 in music =

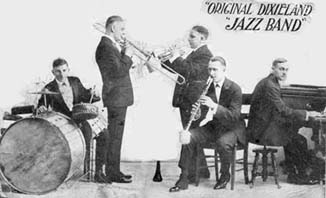
Original Dixieland Jazz Band

This is a list of notable events in music that took place in the year 1917.

== Specific locations ==
- 1917 in British music
- 1917 in Norwegian music

== Specific genres ==
- 1917 in country music
- 1917 in jazz

== Events ==
- March 7 – "Livery Stable Blues", recorded with "Dixie Jazz Band One Step" on February 26 by the Original Dixieland Jass Band (a white 5-piece group from New Orleans led by cornetist Nick LaRocca) for the Victor Talking Machine Company in the United States, becomes the first jazz recording commercially released (described as a "foxtrot"). On August 17 the band records "Tiger Rag"
- May 12 – Béla Bartók's ballet The Wooden Prince is premiered in Budapest
- June 5 - Nicholas Laucella's symphonic impressions White House is premiered in Norfolk, Connecticut.
- First African American jazz recordings made by Wilbur Sweatman's Band
- Eddie Cantor makes his first recordings
- Songs of the First World War become popular in the U.S.

== Bands formed ==
- See Category:Musical groups established in 1917

== Published popular music ==
- "All The World Will Be Jealous Of Me" w. Al Dubin m. Ernest R. Ball
- "Any Time Is Kissing Time" w. Oscar Asche m. Frederic Norton from the musical Chu Chin Chow
- "Are You From Heaven?" w.m. L. Wolfe Gilbert & Anatole Friedland
- "At the Jazz Band Ball" w.m. Edwin B. Edwards, Nick LaRocca, Tony Spargo & Larry Shields
- "A Bachelor Gay" w. Frank Clifford Harris & (Arthur) Valentine m. James W. Tate from the musical The Maid of the Mountains
- "Barnyard Blues" w.m. Edwin B. Edwards, Nick La Rocca, Tony Sbarbaro & Larry Shields
- "The Bells Of St Mary's" w. Douglas Furber m. A. Emmett Adams
- "The Bombo-Shay" by Henry Creamer

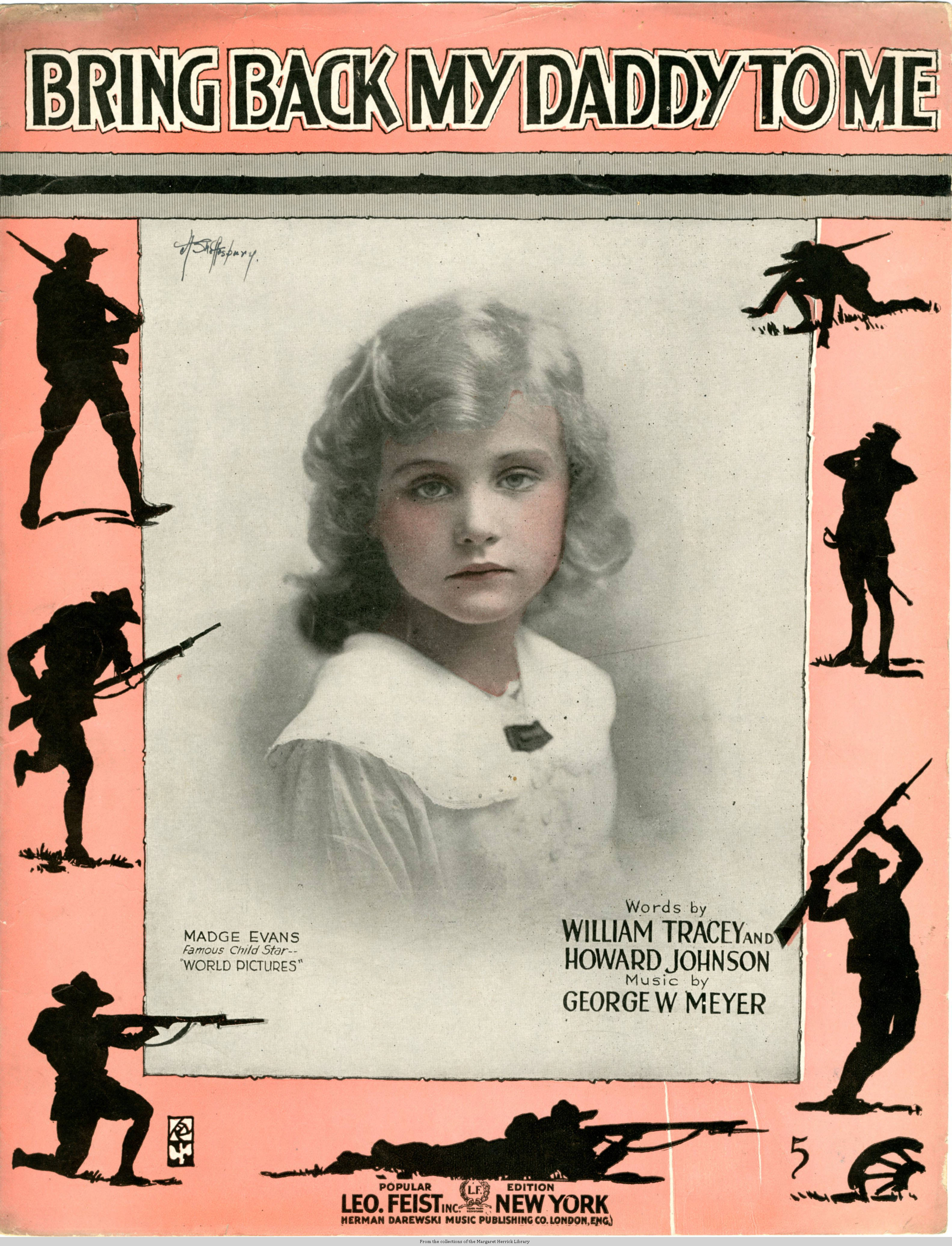
Sheet music cover for "Bring Back My Daddy To Me"

- "Bring Back My Daddy to Me" m. George W. Meyer w. William Tracey & Howard Johnson
- "Bring Me A Rose" w.m. Charles Shisler
- "Cheer Up, Liza" John L. Golden, Raymond Hubbell
- "Cleopatra Had A Jazz Band" w. Jack Coogan m. Jimmy Morgan
- "Come To The Fair" w. Helen Taylor m. Easthope Martin
- "The Darktown Strutters' Ball" w.m. Shelton Brooks
- "Dixie Jass Band One-Step" Original Dixieland Jass Band
- "Eileen (Alanna Asthore)" w. Henry Blossom m. Victor Herbert
- "For Me And My Gal" w. Edgar Leslie & E. Ray Goetz m. George W. Meyer
- "For Your Country and My Country" w.m. Irving Berlin
- "Give a Man a Horse He Can Ride" w. James Thomson m. Geoffrey O'Hara
- "Give Me the Moonlight, Give Me the Girl" w. Lew Brown m. Albert Von Tilzer
- "Going Up" w. Otto Harbach m. Louis A. Hirsch
- "Good Luck and God Be With You, Laddie Boy" w. Will D. Cobb m. Gus Edwards
- "Good Bye Broadway, Hello France" w. C. Francis Reisner & Benny Davis m. Billy Baskette

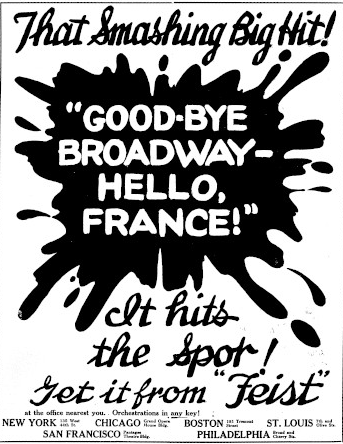
Promotional ad for "Good-bye Broadway—Hello, France!" published in the New York Clipper.

- "Goodbye, Ma! Goodbye, Pa! Goodbye, Mule, with Yer Old Hee-Haw!" w. William Herschell m. Barclay Walker
- "'Good-bye,' That Means You" w. Andrew B. Sterling m. Arthur Lange
- "Good-bye-ee" w.m. R. P. Weston & Bert Lee
- "Hail, Hail, the Gang's All Here" w. D. A. Esrom (pseudonym of Dolly Morse) m. Theodore F. Morse & Arthur Sullivan
- "Have A Heart" w. P. G. Wodehouse m. Jerome Kern
- "Hawaiian Butterfly" w. George A. Little m. Billy Baskette & Joseph H. Santley
- "Homeward Bound" m. George Meyer w. Howard Johnson and Coleman Goetz
- "Homing" w. Arthur L. Salmon m. Teresa del Riego
- "How Can I Forget When There's So Much To Remember" w.m. Irving Berlin
- "Huckleberry Finn" by Cliff Hess
- "I Don't Know Where I'm Going But I'm On My Way" w.m. George Fairman
- "I Don't Want to Get Well" w. Howard Johnson & Harry Pease m. Harry Jentes
- "I May Be Gone for a Long, Long Time" w. Lew Brown m. Albert Von Tilzer
- "I Wish You All the Luck in the World" w. & m. by Abe Olman
- "I'd Love To Be A Monkey In The Zoo" w. Bert Hanlon m. Willie White
- "I'll Take You Back To Italy" w.m. Irving Berlin
- "I'm All Bound Round With The Mason-Dixon Line" w. Sam M. Lewis & Joe Young m. Jean Schwartz
- "I'm Always Chasing Rainbows" w. Joseph McCarthy m. Harry Carroll (melody adapted from Chopin)
- "If I Find The Guy Who Wrote "Poor Butterfly"" w. William Jerome m. Arthur Green
- "Indiana" w. Ballard MacDonald m. James F. Hanley
- "Indianola" m. Henry R. Stern & Domenico Savino
- "Joan of Arc, They Are Calling You" w. Alfred Bryan & Willie Weston m. Jack Wells

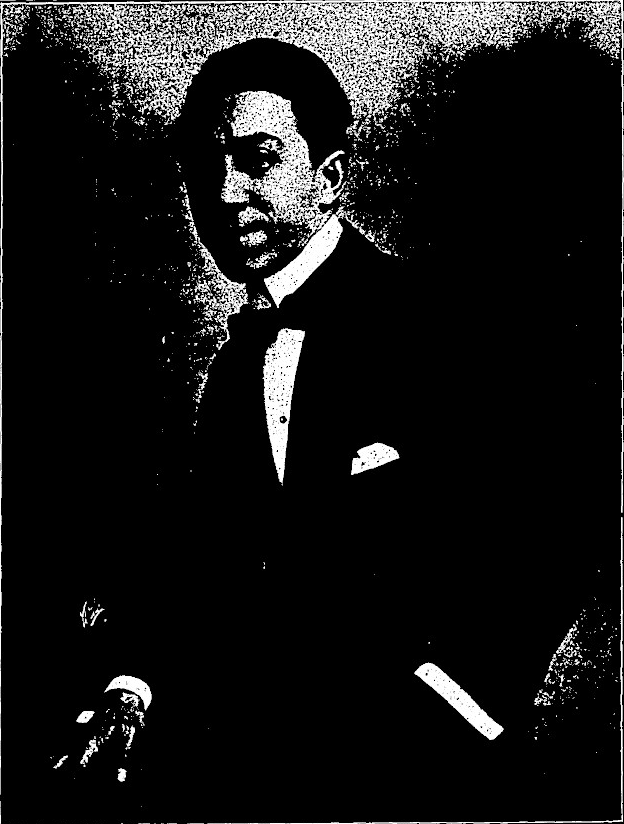
Willie Weston

- "Johnson Rag" m. Guy H. Hall & Henry Kleinhauf
- "Just A Baby's Prayer At Twilight" w. Sam M. Lewis & Joe Young m. M. K. Jerome
- "Leave It to Jane" w. P. G. Wodehouse m. Jerome Kern
- "Let's All Be Americans Now" w.m. Irving Berlin, Edgar Leslie & George W. Meyer
- "Lily Of The Valley" w. L. Wolfe Gilbert m. Anatole Friedland
- "Little Mother of Mine" w. Walter H. Brown m. Harry T. Burleigh
- "Little Sir Echo" w. Laura R. Smith m. J. S. Fearis

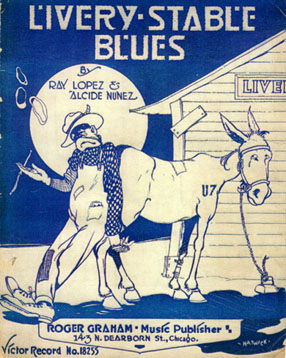
The first "jass" tune to be recorded. Roger Graham Music Publisher, Chicago. Click image for more information.

- "Livery Stable Blues" Alcide Nunez & Ray Lopez
- "Lorraine (My Beautiful Alsace Lorraine)" w. Alfred Bryan m. Fred Fisher
- "Love Will Find A Way" w. Harry Graham m. Harold Fraser-Simson. Introduced by José Collins in the musical The Maid of the Mountains
- "Mademoiselle from Armentières" w.m. anon
- "McNamara's Band" w. John J. Stamford m. Shamus O'Connor
- "The Modern Maiden's Prayer" w. Ballard MacDonald m. James F. Hanley
- "My Sunshine Jane" w. J. Keirn Brennan m. Ernest R. Ball
- "My Sweetie" w.m. Irving Berlin
- "'N' Everything" w.m. Al Jolson, B. G. DeSylva & Gus Kahn
- "Napoleon" w. P.G. Wodehouse m. Jerome Kern
- "Nesting Time in Flatbush" w. P. G. Wodehouse m. Jerome Kern
- "Oh It's a Lovely War" w.m. Maurice Scott
- "Oh Johnny, Oh Johnny, Oh!" w. Ed Rose m. Abe Olman
- "Ole Miss Rag" w.m. W. C. Handy
- "On the Road to Home Sweet Home" w. Gus Kahn m. Egbert van Alstyne
- "Ostrich Walk" m. Edwin B. Edwards, Nick LaRocca, Tony Spargo & Larry Shields
- "Out Where the West Begins" w. Arthur Chapman m. Estelle Philleo
- "Over There" w.m. George M. Cohan
- "Paddy McGinty's Goat" w.m. R.P. Weston, Bert Lee & The Two Bobs
- "A Paradise For Two" w. Frank Clifford Harris & Valentine m. James W. Tate
- "Regretful Blues" w. Grant Clarke m. Cliff Hess
- "Reflection Rag" m. Scott Joplin
- "The Road to Paradise" w. Rida Johnson Young m. Sigmund Romberg from the musical Maytime
- "Rockaway" by Howard Johnson
- "Rolled Into One" w. P. G. Wodehouse m. Jerome Kern
- "Rose Room" w. Harry Williams m. Art Hickman
- "Sailin' Away on the Henry Clay" w. Gus Kahn m. Egbert Van Alstyne
- "Say a Prayer for the Boys "Out There"" w. Bernie Grossman m. Alex Marr
- "Send Me Away With A Smile" w.m. Louis Weslyn & Al Piantadosi
- "Shim-Me-Sha-Wabble" m. Spencer Williams
- "Sing Me Love's Lullaby" w. Dorothy Terris m. Theodore F. Morse
- "The Siren's Song" w. P. G. Wodehouse m. Jerome Kern
- "Slippery Hank" Frank H. Losey
- "Smile And Show Your Dimple" w.m. Irving Berlin (reworked 1933 as "Easter Parade")
- "Some Sunday Morning" w. Gus Kahn & Raymond B. Egan m. Richard A. Whiting
- "Somewhere in France" w. Arthur Wimperis m. Herbert Ivey
- "Somewhere in France Is Daddy" w. m. Great Howard (Howard Miller)
- "Somewhere In France (Is The Lily)" w. Philander Chase Johnson m. Joseph E. Howard
- "Southern Gals" w. Jack Yellen m. Albert Gumble
- "Sweet Emalina My Gal" w. Henry Creamer m. Turner Layton
- "There's A Lump Of Sugar Down In Dixie" w. Alfred Bryan & Jack Yellen m. Albert Gumble
- "There's Something Nice About The South" w.m. Irving Berlin
- "They Go Wild Simply Wild Over Me" w. Joseph McCarthy m. Fred Fisher
- "They'll Be Whistling It All Over Town" w. E. Ray Goetz m.Jean Schwartz
- "Thine Alone" w. Henry Blossom m. Victor Herbert
- "The Tickle Toe" w. Otto Harbach m. Louis Hirsch
- "Tiger Rag" w. Harry De Costa m. Edwin B. Edwards, Nick La Rocca, Tony Sbarbaro, Henry Ragas & Larry Shields
- "Till The Clouds Roll By" w. P. G. Wodehouse, Guy Bolton & Jerome Kern m. Jerome Kern
- "Ugly Chile" w.m. Clarence Williams
- "The Waggle O' The Kilt" w.m. Harry Lauder
- "Wait Till The Cows Come Home" w. Anne Caldwell m. Ivan Caryll
- "When the Boys Come Home" w. John Hay m. Oley Speaks
- "When the Clouds of War Roll By" w. Nat Binns m. Earl Haubrich
- "When Yankee Doodle Learns To Parlez Vous Francais" w. Will Hart m. Edward G. Nelson
- "Where Do We Go from Here?" w. Howard Johnson m. Percy Wenrich
- "Where The Morning Glories Grow" w. Gus Kahn & Raymond B. Egan m. Richard A. Whiting
- "Why Am I Always The Bridesmaid?" w.m. Fred Leigh, Charles Collins & Lily Morris
- "Will You Remember?" w. Rida Johnson Young m. Sigmund Romberg
- "You Brought Ireland Right Over To Me" w. J. Keirn Brennan m. Ernest R. Ball
- "You Never Knew About Me" w. P. G. Wodehouse m. Jerome Kern

== Hit recordings ==
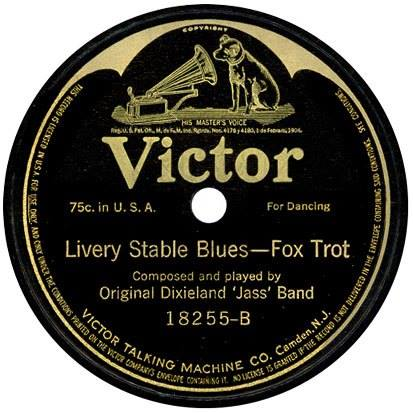
The first commercial jazz recording, 1917.

- "Livery Stable Blues/Dixie Jass One Step" by the Original Dixieland Jass Band
- "Goodbye Broadway, Hello France" by the American Quartet
- "A Bachelor Gay" by Peter Dawson
- "I Don't Want To Get Well" by Van & Schenck
- "Joe Turner Blues" by Wilbur Sweatman
- "Long Boy" by Byron G. Harlan With The Peerless Quartet
- "Over There" recorded by
  - Billy Murray
  - Nora Bayes
- "Poor Butterfly" by the Victor Military Band
- "That's The Kind Of A Baby For Me" by Eddie Cantor
- "The Waggle O' The Kilt" by Harry Lauder
- "Yaddie Kaddie Kiddie Kaddie Koo" by Van & Schenck

== Classical music ==
- Arnold Bax – November Woods
- Lili Boulanger – Psaume 130 (Du fond de l'abîme)
- Frank Bridge – Cello Sonata in D minor
- John Alden Carpenter
  - The Birthday of the Infanta, ballet
  - The Home Road for SATB mixed chorus or unison voices and piano
  - Symphony No. 1 ("Sermons in Stones")
- Carlos Chávez – Sonata fantasia (Piano Sonata No. 1)
- Nancy Dalberg – Symphony in C-sharp minor
- Claude Debussy – Violin Sonata in G minor
- Frederick Delius – Eventyr (Once Upon a Time)
- Gabriel Fauré – Cello Sonata No. 1
- Alexander Glazunov – Piano Concerto No. 2 in B, Op. 100
- Launy Grøndahl – Violin Concerto in D Major
- Charles Koechlin
  - La divine vesprée, ballet
  - Paysages et marines, Op. 63bis, version for flute, clarinet, string quartet, and piano
  - Sonata for cello and piano, Op. 66
- Carl Nielsen – Chaconne, for piano
- Willem Pijper
  - Symphony No. 1, Pan
  - Sonatina No. 1, for piano
  - De Lente Komt, choral
- Sergei Prokofiev
  - Violin Concerto No. 1, Op. 19
  - Igrok (The Gambler), opera, Op. 24
  - Mimoletnosti (Visions fugitives), 20 pieces for piano, Op. 22
  - Piano Sonata No. 3 ("From Old Notebooks"), Op. 28
  - Piano Sonata No. 4 ("From Old Notebooks"), Op. 29
  - Symphony No. 1 Classical, Op. 25
- Maurice Ravel – Le tombeau de Couperin, for piano
- Ottorino Respighi – Ancient Airs and Dances Suite No. 1
- Arnold Schoenberg – Verklärte Nacht (string orchestra version)
- Jean Sibelius – Humoresques for Violin and Orchestra opp. 87 and 89
- Charles Villiers Stanford
  - Aviator's Hymn, for tenor, bass, choir, and organ
  - Irish Rhapsody No. 5, in G Minor, for orchestra
  - Night Thoughts, Op. 148, for piano
  - "On Windy Way When Morning Breaks", partsong
  - Sailing Song, partsong, two soprano voices
  - "St George of England", song
  - Scènes de ballet, Op. 150, for piano
  - Sonata No. 1, in F major, Op. 149, for organ
  - Sonata No. 2 ("Eroica"), in G minor, Op. 151, for organ
  - Sonata No. 3 ("Britannica"), in D minor, Op. 152, for organ
- Igor Stravinsky
  - Berceuse, for voice and piano
  - Le chant du rossignol, symphonic poem
  - Cinq pièces faciles, for piano 4 hands
  - "Ovsen’", No. 2 from Podblyudnïye (Saucers) (Four Russian Peasant Songs), for women's choir
  - Song of the Volga Boatmen, arrangement for winds and percussion
  - Study, for pianola
  - Valse pour les enfants, for piano (possibly 1916)
- Karol Szymanowski
  - Sonata No. 3, for piano
  - String Quartet No. 1 in C major
  - Demeter, cantata
  - Agave, cantata
- Heitor Villa-Lobos
  - String Quartet No. 4
  - Symphony No. 2 Ascenção (Ascension), revised or completed 1943/44
- Eugène Ysaÿe – Exil, for string orchestra of only violins and violas, Op. 25

== Opera ==
- Armas Launis – Kullervo
- Sergei Prokofiev – The Gambler
- Ignatz Waghalter – Jugend
- Giacomo Puccini – La rondine, Opéra de Monte-Carlo, 27 March
- Richard Strauss – Die Frau ohne Schatten
- Gabriel von Wayditch – The Caliph's Magician
- Alexander Zemlinsky – Eine florentinische Tragödie

== Film ==
- Pietro Mascagni – Rapsodia Satanica

== Musical theatre ==
- The Beauty Spot West End production opened at the Gaiety Theatre on 22 December and ran for 152 performances
- The Better 'Ole London production opened at the Oxford Theatre on August 4 and ran for 811 performances
- The Boy London production opened at the Adelphi Theatre on September 14 and ran for 801 performances
- Cheep London revue opened at the Vaudeville Theatre on April 26.
- Chu Chin Chow Broadway production opened at the Manhattan Opera House on October 22 and ran for 208 performances
- Eileen opened at the Shubert Theatre on March 19 and ran for 64 performances.
- Hanky Panky London revue opened at the Empire Theatre on March 24
- Jack O'Lantern Broadway production opened at the Globe Theatre on October 16 and ran for 265 performances
- Leave It to Jane Broadway production opened at the Longacre Theatre on August 28 and ran for 167 performances
- The Maid Of The Mountains London production opened at Daly's Theatre on February 10 and ran for 1352 performances
- Maytime Broadway production opened at the Shubert Theatre on August 16 and ran for 492 performances
- Miss 1917 Broadway revue opened at the Century Theatre on November 5 and ran for 72 performances
- Oh, Boy! (musical) Broadway production opened at the Princess Theatre on February 20 and ran for 463 performances
- The Riviera Girl Broadway production opened at the New Amsterdam Theatre on September 24 and ran for 78 performances
- Arlette West End production opened at the Shaftesbury Theatre on 6 September and ran for 280 performances

== Births ==
- January 2 – Vera Zorina, German dancer and actress (died 2003)
- January 3 – Pierre Dervaux, French operatic conductor, composer and pedagogue (d. 1992)
- January 10 – Jerry Wexler, music journalist and record producer (d. 2008)
- January 12
  - Walter Hendl, American conductor, composer and pianist (d. 2007)
  - Maharishi Mahesh Yogi, major influence on The Beatles (d. 2008)
- January 15 – Tiny Timbrell, guitarist (d. 1992)
- January 19 – John Raitt, American actor and singer (d. 2005)
- February 11 – Arcesia, American singer (d. 1983)
- February 15 – Denise Scharley, French contralto (d. 2011)
- February 18 – Dona Massin, Canadian choreographer (d. 2001)
- February 20 – Juan Vicente Torrealba, Venezuelan harpist and composer (d. 2019)
- February 25 – Anthony Burgess, English composer (d. 1993)
- February 27 – George Mitchell, Scottish founder of the Black and White Minstrels (d. 2002)
- March 2
  - Desi Arnaz, musician, actor and producer (d. 1986)
  - John Gardner, composer (d. 2011)
- March 7 – Janet Collins, dancer and choreographer (d. 2003)
- March 12 – Leonard Chess, founder of Chess Records (d. 1969)
- March 17 – Brian Boydell, Irish composer (d. 2000)
- March 18 – Riccardo Brengola, violinist (d. 2004)
- March 19 – Dinu Lipatti, pianist (d. 1950)
- March 20 – Vera Lynn, singer (d. 2020)
- March 21 – Anton Coppola, opera conductor (d. 2020)
- March 23
  - Josef Locke, tenor (d. 1999)
  - Oscar Shumsky, violinist (d. 2000)
- March 26 – Rufus Thomas, singer (d. 2001)
- March 30
  - Els Aarne, composer (d. 1995)
  - Rudolf Brucci, composer (d. 2002)
- April 9 – Johannes Bobrowski, lyricist (d. 1965)
- April 12 – Helen Forrest, American jazz singer (d. 1999)
- April 22 – Yvette Chauviré, ballerina (d. 2016)
- April 25 – Ella Fitzgerald, jazz singer (d. 1996)
- April 30 – Bea Wain, US big band singer (d. 2017)
- May 1
  - Danielle Darrieux, singer and actress (d. 2017)
  - Lily Lian, street singer (d. 2020)
- May 14
  - Lou Harrison, US composer (d. 2003)
  - Norman Luboff, US choral director (d. 1987)
- May 16 – Vera Rózsa, singer and voice teacher (d. 2010)
- May 21 – Dennis Day, US singer (d. 1988)
- May 22 – Georg Tintner, Austrian conductor (d. 1999)
- May 28 – Papa John Creach, fiddler (Jefferson Airplane) (d. 1994)
- June 4 – Robert Merrill, operatic baritone (d. 2004)
- June 7 – Dean Martin, singer and actor (d. 1995)
- June 19 – Dave Lambert, US singer and arranger (d. 1966)
- June 29
  - Sylvia Olden Lee, vocal coach and accompanist (d. 2004)
  - Ulpio Minucci, songwriter and composer (d. 2007)
- June 24 – Ramblin' Tommy Scott, American singer and guitarist (d. 2013)
- June 30 – Lena Horne, singer (died 2010)
- July 2 – Murry Wilson, American songwriter, producer and manager (d. 1973)
- July 14 – Roshan, Bollywood composer (d. 1967)
- July 17
  - Generoso Jiménez, Cuban trombone player (d. 2007)
  - Red Sovine, American country & folk singer-songwriter (d. 1980)
- July 18 – Henri Salvador, French Caribbean singer (died 2008)
- July 24
  - Henri Betti, French composer and pianist (d. 2005)
  - Robert Farnon, Canadian composer (d. 2005)
  - Leonor Orosa Goquinco, Filipino pianist and dancer (d. 2005)
- August 3 – Antonio Lauro, guitarist and composer (d. 1986)
- August 17 – Walter Brown, blues shouter (d. 1956)
- August 22 – John Lee Hooker, blues musician (d. 2001)
- August 23 – Tex Williams, American country singer (d. 1985)
- September 5 – Art Rupe, founder of Specialty Records (d. 2022)
- September 11 – Myrta Silva, singer and composer (d. 1987)
- September 13 – Robert Ward, composer (d. 2013)
- September 15 – Richard Arnell, English composer (d. 2009)
- September 30 – Buddy Rich, American jazz drummer (d. 1987)
- October 4 – Violeta Parra, Chilean folk musician (suicide 1967)
- October 7 – June Allyson, American singer and actress (d. 2006)
- October 10 – Thelonious Monk, American jazz pianist (d. 1982)
- October 13 – George Osmond, father of the Osmond brothers (d. 2007)
- October 21
  - William Adam, trumpeter (d. 2013)
  - Dizzy Gillespie, jazz musician (d. 1993)
- October 24 – Mike Pedicin, jazz bandleader (d. 2016)
- October 31 – Anna Marly, French singer-songwriter (d. 2006)
- November 12
  - Hedley Jones, Jamaican musician (d. 2017)
  - Jo Stafford, American pop singer (d. 2008)

== Deaths ==
- January – Friederike Grün, operatic soprano (born 1836)
- January 13 – Albert Niemann, Wagnerian tenor (b. 1831)
- February 10 – Emile Pessard, French composer (b. 1843)
- February 25 – Paul Rubens, English songwriter (b. 1875)
- March 1 – Antonina Miliukova, widow of Pyotr Ilyich Tchaikovsky (b. 1848)
- March 4 – Julius Bechgaard, Danish composer (b. 1843)
- March 25 – Spyridon Samaras, composer (b. 1861)
- April 1 – Scott Joplin, ragtime composer (b. 1868)
- April 29 – Florence Farr, actress, singer and composer (b. 1860)
- May 20 – Romilda Pantaleoni, operatic soprano (b. 1847)
- May 25 – Edouard de Reszke, operatic bass (b. 1853)
- June 12 – Teresa Carreño, pianist, singer and conductor (b. 1853)
- July 16 – Philipp Scharwenka, composer (b. 1847)
- August 7 – Basil Hood, librettist and lyricist (b. 1864)
- August 12 – Pavel Gerdt, dancer (b. 1844)
- September 5 – Marie Hanfstängl, operatic soprano (b. 1848)
- September 8 – Charles Edouard Lefebvre, French composer (b. 1843)
- September 11 – Evie Greene, actress and singer (b. 1875)
- September 15 – Elias Oechsler, composer (b. 1850)
- October 3 – Eduardo di Capua, singer and songwriter (b. 1865)
- November 20 – Frederick Herbert Torrington, conductor, organist, and founder of the Toronto College of Music (b. 1836)
- December 7 – Ludwig Minkus, violinist and composer (b. 1826)
- December 9 – Nat M. Wills, singer, comedian, and actor (b. 1873)
