= Music of World War I =

Colonel Bogey March
The "Colonel Bogey March" was composed by a British army bandmaster in 1914.

The music of World War I is the music which was composed during the war or which is associated with the war.

== Music hall ==
In 1914, music hall was by far the most popular form of popular song. It was listened to and sung along to in theatres which were getting ever larger (three thousand seaters were not uncommon) and in which the musical acts were gradually overshadowing all other acts (animal imitators, acrobats, human freaks, conjurors, etc.) The industry was more and more dominated by chains of theatres like Moss, and by music publishers, since selling sheet music was very profitable. Indeed, a real hit could sell over a million copies.

The seats at the music hall could be very cheap and attracted a largely working class audience, for whom a gramophone would generally be too expensive. Although many ordinary people had heard gramophones in seaside resorts or in park concerts organized by local councils, many more would discover the gramophone while in the army, since gramophone manufacturers produced large numbers of portable gramophones "for our soldiers in France".

The repertoire of songs was dominated by the jauntily comic. Humorous stereotypes of domineering wives or mothers-in-law, the bourgeoisie, foreigners, Blacks and Jews were often subjects of songs. Many more songs were made up of tongue-twisters or other comic elements. Sentimental love songs and dreams of an ideal land (Ireland or Dixie in particular) made up another major category. Practically all the songs of the era are unknown today; several thousand music hall songs were published in the UK alone during the war years.

The singers moved from town to town, many just scraping together a living, but a few making a lot of money. The key stars at the time included Marie Lloyd, Vesta Tilley, George Formby, Sr., Harry Lauder, Gertie Gitana and Harry Champion.

== Enthusiasm for the war ==
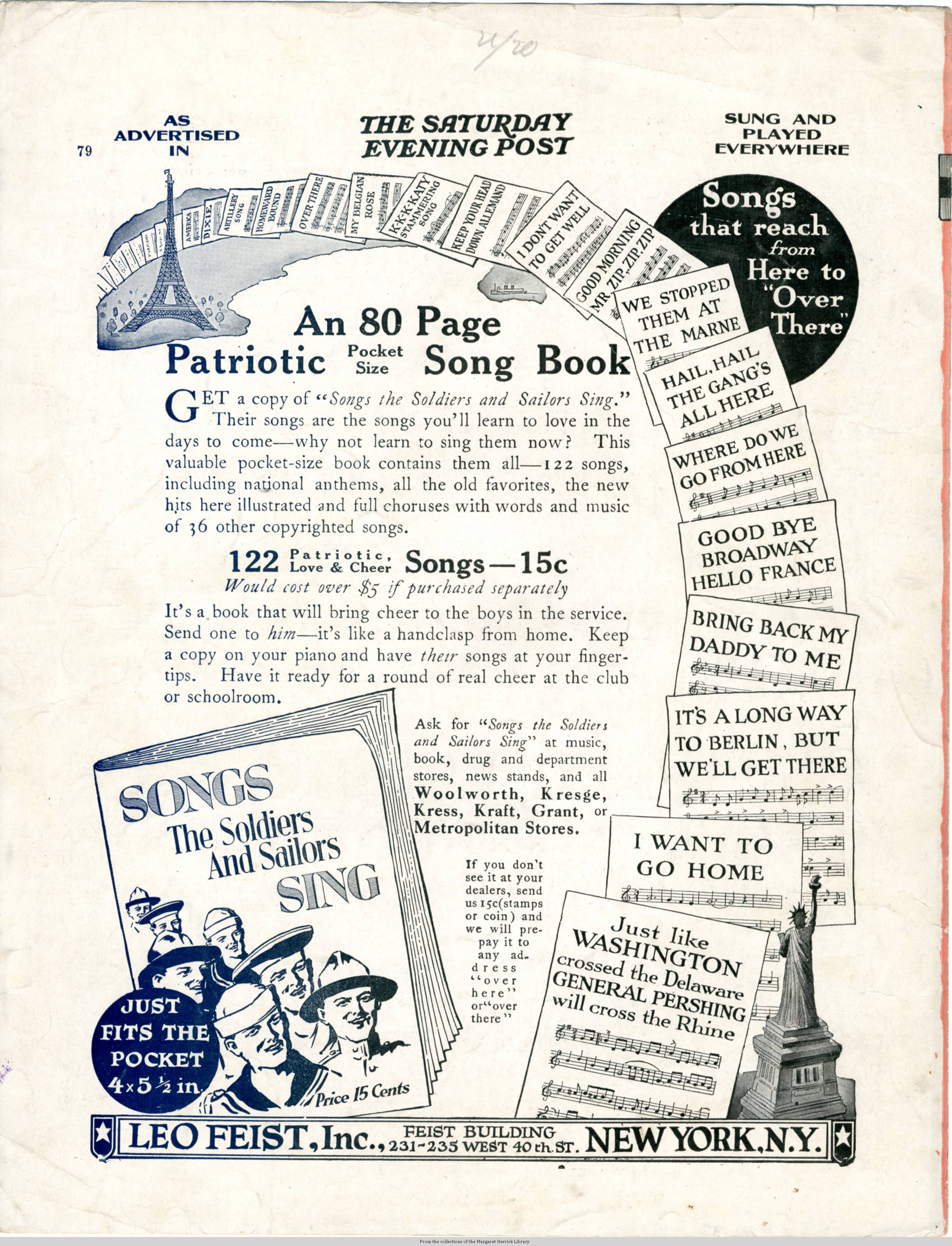
1917 advertisement for "An 80 page pocket-size patriotic song book"

At the outbreak of war, many songs were produced which called for young men to join up. Examples included "Your King and Country Want You", "Now You've Got the Khaki On" or "Kitcheners' Boys". After a few months of war and rising numbers of deaths, the recruitment songs all but disappeared, and the 1915 "Greatest hits" collection published by Francis and Day contains no recruitment songs at all. The music hall songs which mentioned the war (about a third of the total produced) were more and more dreams about the end of the war—"When the Boys Come Home" and "Keep the Home Fires Burning" are two well-known examples.

Popular, patriotic songs that were composed during the war also served to raise the morale of soldiers and civilians alike. These hit songs covered a variety of themes, such as separation of loved ones, boot camp, war as an adventure, and humorous songs about the military life.

The music within the concert halls of popular American orchestras did not play the standard repertoire of Mozart, Beethoven, or any other major German affiliated composer. The anti-German craze of the general public at the time caused even the conductor of the Boston Symphony Orchestra, Dr. Karl Muck, to be deported. Any kind of musical affiliation to Austria, Hungary, or Germany was not played within American concert halls during the war.

Because there were no radios or televisions that reported the conditions of the battlefields, Americans had a romantic view of war. Not only were many of the songs patriotic, but they were also romantic. These songs portrayed soldiers as brave and noble, while the women were portrayed as fragile and loyal as they waited for their loved ones.

== Songs of World War I ==
- After the War Is Over Will There Be Any "Home Sweet Home"?
- Berlin Bound
- Bring Back My Soldier Boy to Me
- God Be with Our Boys Tonight
- Hock the Kaiser!
- It's a Long Way to Tipperary
- Liberty Forever!
- Over in Hero-Land
- Salute the Flag: March & Two-Step
- Someday They're Coming Home Again
- The Dream of a Soldier Boy
- There's a Garden of Crosses in No Man's Land
- They All Sang "Annie Laurie" (the Song That Reaches Ev'ry Heart)
- Uncle Sam and His Battering Ram
- When I Send You a Picture of Berlin, You'll Know It's Over, Over There
- When You Come Home

=== Anti-war songs ===
It was almost impossible to sing anti-war songs on the music-hall stage. The managers of music halls would be worried about their license, and the singalong nature of music hall songs meant that one needed to sing songs which had the support of the vast majority of the audience. In the music hall, dissent about the war drive was therefore limited to sarcastic songs such as "Oh It's a Lovely War" or bitter complaints about the stupidity of conscription tribunals (for example "The Military Representative"). When the anti-war movement had, for a few months in 1916, a mass audience, anti-war music hall songs from the United States such as "I Didn't Raise My Boy to Be a Soldier" were sung at anti-war meetings, but not on the music hall stage.

== See also ==
- World War I in popular culture
- Category:Songs of World War I
