= 1917 in British music =

This is a summary of 1917 in music in the United Kingdom.

== Events ==
- January – Morfydd Llwyn Owen makes her professional debut at London's Aeolian Hall.
- Summer – Composer Arnold Bax and his lover, pianist Harriet Cohen, holiday together in Cornwall.
- 26 November – After several cancellations, Granville Bantock's Tone Poem No. 3, also known as Orchestral Drama: Fifine at the Fair, is finally performed by the Royal Philharmonic Society, conducted by Sir Thomas Beecham.
- date unknown – Under the direction of Rupert D'Oyly Carte, the D'Oyly Carte Opera Company makes the first complete recording of a Gilbert and Sullivan opera, The Mikado, for the Gramophone Company (later His Master's Voice).

== Popular music ==
- Edward Elgar and Rudyard Kipling – "The Lowestoft Boat"
- Bert Lee and R. P. Weston – "Paddy McGinty's Goat"

== Classical music: new works ==
- Kenneth J. Alford
  - On the Quarter Deck, march
  - The Middy, march
  - The Voice of the Guns
- Arnold Bax – November Woods
- Frank Bridge – Cello Sonata in D minor
- Rebecca Clarke – Morpheus
- Frederick Delius – Eventyr (Once Upon a Time)
- Edward Elgar
  - The Sanguine Fan (ballet)
  - The Spirit of England
- Gustav Holst – The Hymn of Jesus
- Charles Villiers Stanford
  - Aviator's Hymn, for tenor, bass, choir, and organ
  - Irish Rhapsody No. 5, in G Minor, for orchestra
  - Night Thoughts, Op. 148, for piano
  - "On Windy Way When Morning Breaks", partsong
  - Sailing Song, partsong, two soprano voices
  - "St George of England", song
  - Scènes de ballet, Op. 150, for piano
  - Sonata No. 1, in F major, Op. 149, for organ
  - Sonata No. 2 ("Eroica"), in G minor, Op. 151, for organ
  - Sonata No. 3 ("Britannica"), in D minor, Op. 152, for organ

== Musical theatre ==
- 10 February – The Maid of the Mountains by Seymour Hicks, with music by Sidney Jones and Paul Rubens, and lyrics by Adrian Ross, starring José Collins, by Harold Fraser-Simson, with additional music by James W. Tate, lyrics by Harry Graham and additional lyrics by Frank Clifford Harris and Valentine, opens at Daly's Theatre, where it runs for 1,352 performances.
- 14 September – The Boy, by Fred Thompson and Percy Greenbank, with music by Lionel Monckton and Howard Talbot and lyrics by Greenbank and Adrian Ross, opens at the Adelphi Theatre for a run of 801 performances, starring Maisie Gay and Donald Calthrop.

== Births ==
- 25 February – Anthony Burgess, composer and writer (died 1993)
- 27 February – George Mitchell, founder of the Black and White Minstrels (died 2002)
- 2 March – John Gardner, composer (died 2011)
- 20 March – Vera Lynn, singer (died 2020)
- 23 March – Josef Locke, tenor (died 1999)
- 29 June – Mary Berry, canoness, choral conductor and musicologist (died 2008)
- 6 July – Hugo Cole, composer and critic (died 1995)
- 15 September – Richard Arnell, composer (died 2009)

== Deaths ==
- 25 February – Paul Rubens, composer and songwriter, 41 (tuberculosis)
- 7 August – Basil Hood, librettist and lyricist, 53
- 11 September – Evie Greene, actress and singer, 42 (Bright's disease)

== See also ==
- 1917 in the United Kingdom
