= Joe Schenck =

Joe Schenck may refer to:

- Joseph M. Schenck (1876–1961), American film studio executive
- Joe Schenck (1891–1930), half of the vaudeville musical duo Van and Schenck
