= Where the West Begins =

Where the West Begins may refer to:

- Out Where the West Begins, a poem by Arthur Chapman published in 1917
- "Where the West Begins", the motto for Fort Worth, Texas, the 13th-largest city in the United States of America
- Where the West Begins (1919 film), an American film directed by Henry King
- Where the West Begins (1928 film), an American film directed by Robert J. Horner
- Where the West Begins (1938 film), an American film directed by J.P. McGowan
- "Where the West Begins", the name of the first two episodes of MechWest
