= The Flowers of Peace =

Independent cultural creation project

The Flowers of Peace (formerly Flowers of War) is an is an independent cultural creation project founded in 2015 by the Australian War Memorial's first musical Artist in Residence, Christopher Latham, who directs a team of artists, composers, assistants and producers. Through cultural recovery and the creation of seven war requiems, the project aims to address and transform historical trauma arising from conflicts Australia has been involved with.

Featuring a range of musical genres and re-discovered compositions, The Flowers of Peace has produced over 100 hours of music, engaged with over 1,000 artists, and commissioned 26 world premieres, including premieres of Australian composer arrangements. These multi-author works feature many of Australia's top composers, such as Peter Sculthorpe, Ross Edwards, Elena Kats-Chernin, Andrew Schultz, Graeme Koehne, Jonathan Mills, Cyrus Meurant, Julian Yu, Richard Mills and others, along with international composers such as Karen Tanaka, Paul Carr and Paul Mealor. This repertoire is continually published online and will be archived by the Australian War Memorial for free use in perpetuity

== Projects ==
=== Cultural recovery ===
As part of its cultural recovery project, The Flowers of Peace has produced various concerts and CDs primarily focusing on the music and art of WW1 and WW2.

In 2019, Latham and his team launched the Flowers of The Great War Collection, with digital sheet music and recordings alongside a physical book, compiling the cultural recovery work of art and music made during World War I. This included program notes, sheet music, copies of art work, and recordings.

A large aspect of this cultural recovery work has been the music of Frederick Septimus Kelly, an Australian composer killed in the Battle of the Somme in 1916. Two CDs of Kelly’s work were released, and in November 2026, the Frederick Septimus Kelly collection will be released alongside Therese Radic’s biography. This collection will contain recordings and sheet music, many of which has been collated after recovery and typesetting by the Flowers of Peace team.

==== List of cultural recovery projects ====
Year	Name	Type	Summary
2015	Resounding Gallipoli	Concert and CD	Music and Art from the Gallipoli Campaign
2016	The Man Who Painted Blue Horses	Concert	Music and Art from Verdun
2016	Sacrifice	Concert	Composers of the Somme
2016	Three Treasures	Concert	Music and art of Claude Dubosq, Botho Sigwart, Frederick Septimus Kelly
2017	1917 The Night is Darkest Before The Dawn	Concert	Compositions from 1917, with a preview of the Diggers Requiem.
2017	The Healers	Concert	Chamber opera about nurses
2017	Monet's The Flowers of War	Concert	Concert about 'the death of Impressionism' as a result of WW1
2017/18	100 WW1 Songs	Recording	Recording of 100 songs written in WW1 by Australian Soldiers
2018	The Lost Jewels	Concert	Concert featuring artwork and music by composers and artists killed in World War 1
2021	The Changi Songbook Recordings	Concert	Recording of the Changi Songbook
2024	The Mirror	Concert	Works by WW2 Refugees
2024	Lost Love Songs	Concert	Works by composers killed in the Holocaust

=== Cultural creation ===
One of the key projects of the Flowers of Peace is the creation of 7 multi-composer ‘War Requiems’. Each is approximately 2.5 hours, and uses music, text and artworks to impartially recount the history of 20th century conflicts involving Australians. In each work, the first half of the concert features music created at the time of each conflict, whilst the second half is made up of new works commissioned by the Flowers of Peace. Each requiem features new commissions by top Australian and International composers, for example the Vietnam Requiem featured both Australian and Vietnamese composers, and the WW2 Requiem featured Japanese, German and Australian composers.

==== List of works in The Gift ====
The following works are included:

Year	Name	Conflict
2015	The Gallipoli Symphony	WW1
2018	The Diggers Requiem	WW1
2021	The Vietnam Requiem	Vietnam War
2022	The Prisoners of War Requiem	WW2
2024	The Holocaust Memorial	WW2
2025	The WW2 Memorial: A Greater Love	WW2
2028	Peacekeeping Symphony	N/A

== See also ==
- Music of World War I
- Music in World War II
