= Mystery Ranch =

Mystery Ranch may refer to:

- Mystery Ranch, a 1921 Western mystery novel by Arthur Chapman
- Mystery Ranch (1932 film), a 1932 American Western film
- Mystery Ranch (1934 film), a 1934 Western film made by Reliable Pictures
- Mystery Ranch, a 1958 children's novel, number four in The Boxcar Children series
- Mystery Ranch of Bozeman, Montana, a backpack manufacturer founded in 2000
- Mystery Ranch (company), a backpack manufacturer and military contractor
