= Pasta e fagioli =

Italian pasta soup

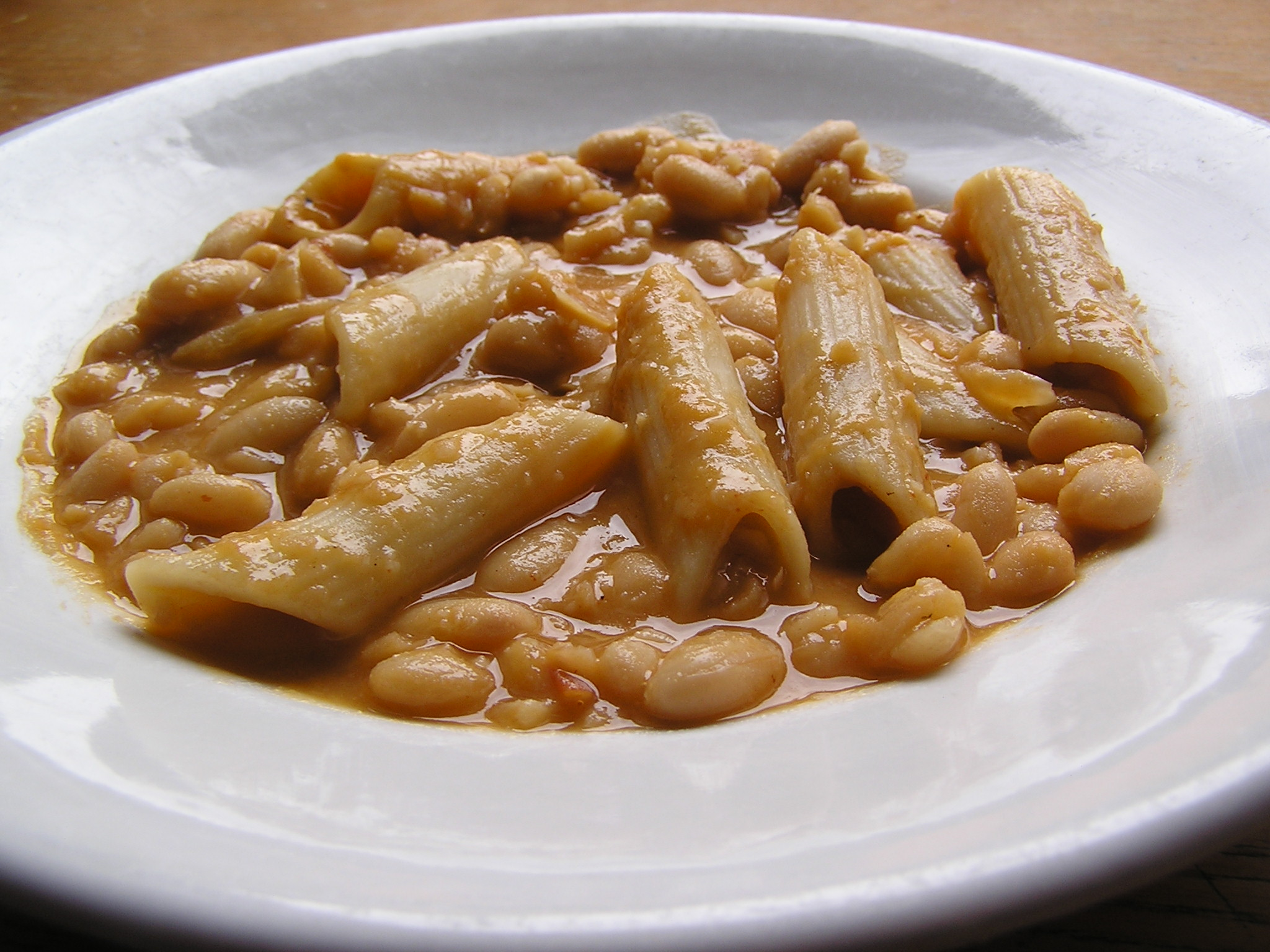
- Type: Pasta soup
- Course: Primo (Italian course)
- Place of origin: Italy
- Main ingredients: Small pasta and beans

Pasta e fagioli (Italian: [ˈpasta e faˈdʒɔːli]; lit. 'pasta and beans') is an Italian pasta soup of which there are several regional variants.

Once a dish eaten by the poor, pasta e fagioli is now eaten across social classes, and considered nostalgic and healthy.

== Preparation ==
Recipes for pasta e fagioli vary, with the only requirement being that beans and pasta are included. While the dish varies between regions, it is most commonly made using cannellini beans, navy beans, or borlotti beans, and a small variety of pasta, such as elbow macaroni or ditalini.

== Variations ==
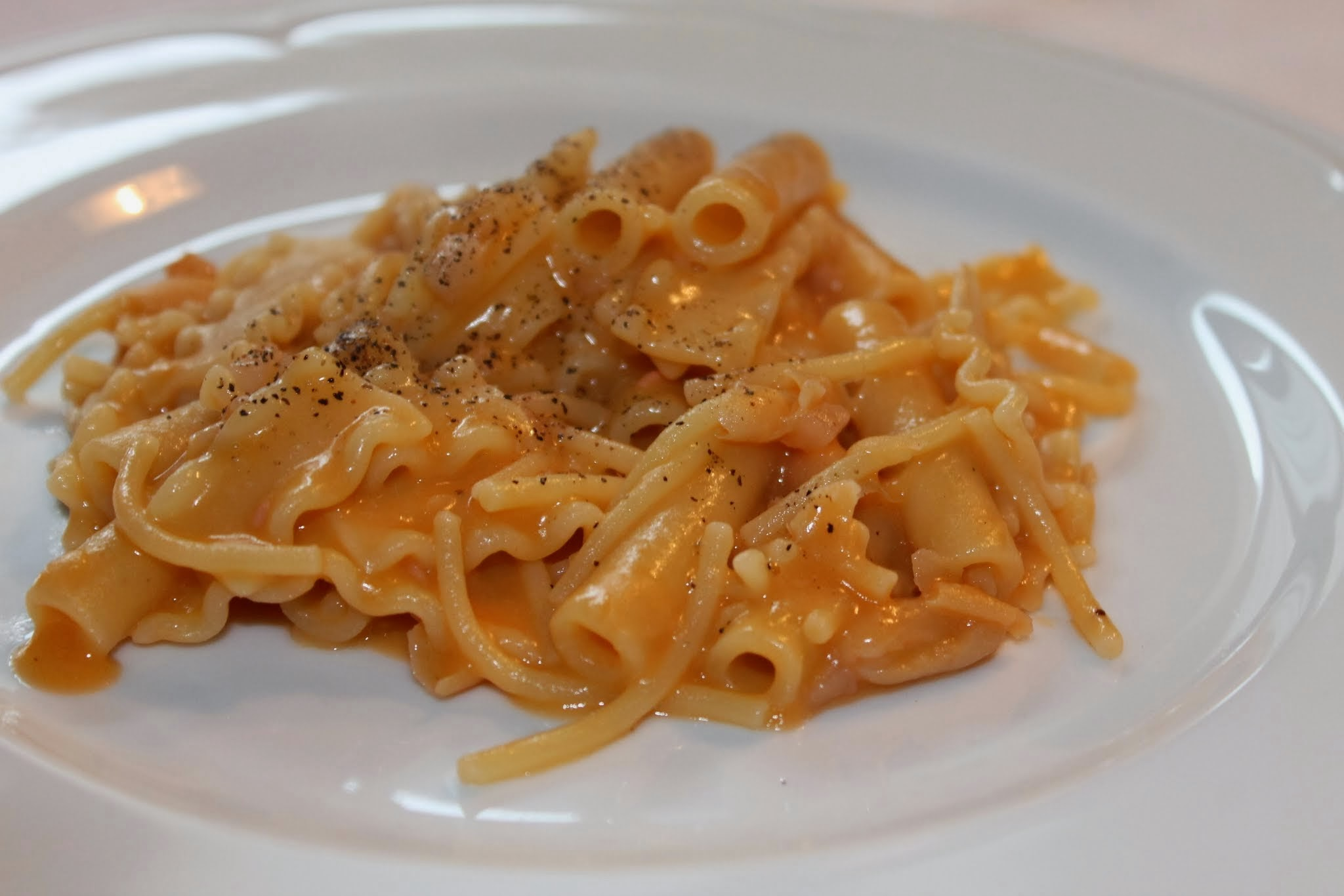
Pasta e fagioli alla napoletana

Preparations vary locally, and changing a component—olive oil or pork fat, browned or unbrowned garlic, dry or soupy—produces a new version of the dish. In Campania, traditional animal fats have largely been replaced with olive oil due to growing health concerns.

Pasta e ceci, a version replacing the beans with chickpeas, is common in Rome. According to Vincenzo Buonassisi, pasta e fagioli sgranati (sgranati means 'shelled') is a Neapolitan variant using fresh beans which must be shelled before use.

== In popular culture ==
"Pastafazoola", a 1927 novelty song by Van and Schenck, plays off of the Neapolitan pronunciation in the rhyme "Don't be a fool, eat pasta fazool."

The song "That's Amore", by Warren and Brooks (popularised by Dean Martin), includes the rhyme "When the stars make you drool, just like pasta fazool, that's amore." Pasta e fagioli was also among Dean Martin's and Frank Sinatra's favorite meals.

== See also ==
Media related to Pasta e fagioli at Wikimedia Commons

- List of Italian soups
- List of legume dishes
- List of pasta
- List of pasta dishes
- Minestrone
