= Pastafazoola =

1927 song by Van and Schenck

"Pastafazoola" (also known as "Pastafazula") is a 1927 novelty song written by the early 20th-century American songwriting duo of Van and Schenck. Borrowing heavily from the Italian standard "Funiculì, Funiculà", the song tells of the masterful feats of world-leading individuals who ate the traditional Italian dish pasta e fagioli, which is simple peasant food of pasta and navy beans. Among the individuals mentioned in the song are Babe Ruth, who had hit a record 60 home runs during the 1927 season, singer John McCormack, John D. Rockefeller, Jack Dempsey, Charles Lindbergh, Christopher Columbus and Benito Mussolini.

Van and Schenck recorded the song, as did The Happiness Boys, who used a humorous fake Italian accent. The latter recorded it on October 13, 1927, in New York City for the Victor Talking Machine Company, which issued it as Victor record number 20925.
