= Uncle Sam and His Battering Ram =

Song
- Language: English
- Published: 1918
- Composer(s): Ida K. Mervine
- Lyricist(s): Robert P. Hall

Uncle Sam and His Battering Ram is a World War I song written by Robert P. Hall and composed by Ida K. Mervine. The song was first published in 1918 by Mervine & Hall Music in Phoenix, AZ. The sheet music cover features Uncle Sam pointing to Wilhelm II as a ram butts him in the stomach.

The sheet music can be found at the Pritzker Military Museum & Library.
