= The Dream of a Soldier Boy =

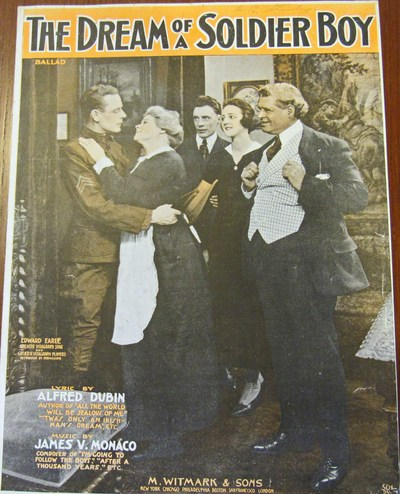
- Sheet Music cover

Song
- Published: 1917
- Genre: World War I song
- Composer(s): James V. Monaco
- Lyricist(s): Al Dubin

"The Dream of a Soldier Boy" is a World War I song written by Al Dubin and composed by James V. Monaco. It was published in 1917 by Witmark & Sons in New York City. The sheet music cover depicts a photo of a soldier embracing his mother while a proud father and others look on.

The sheet music can be found at the Pritzker Military Museum & Library.
