= In the Land O' Yamo Yamo =

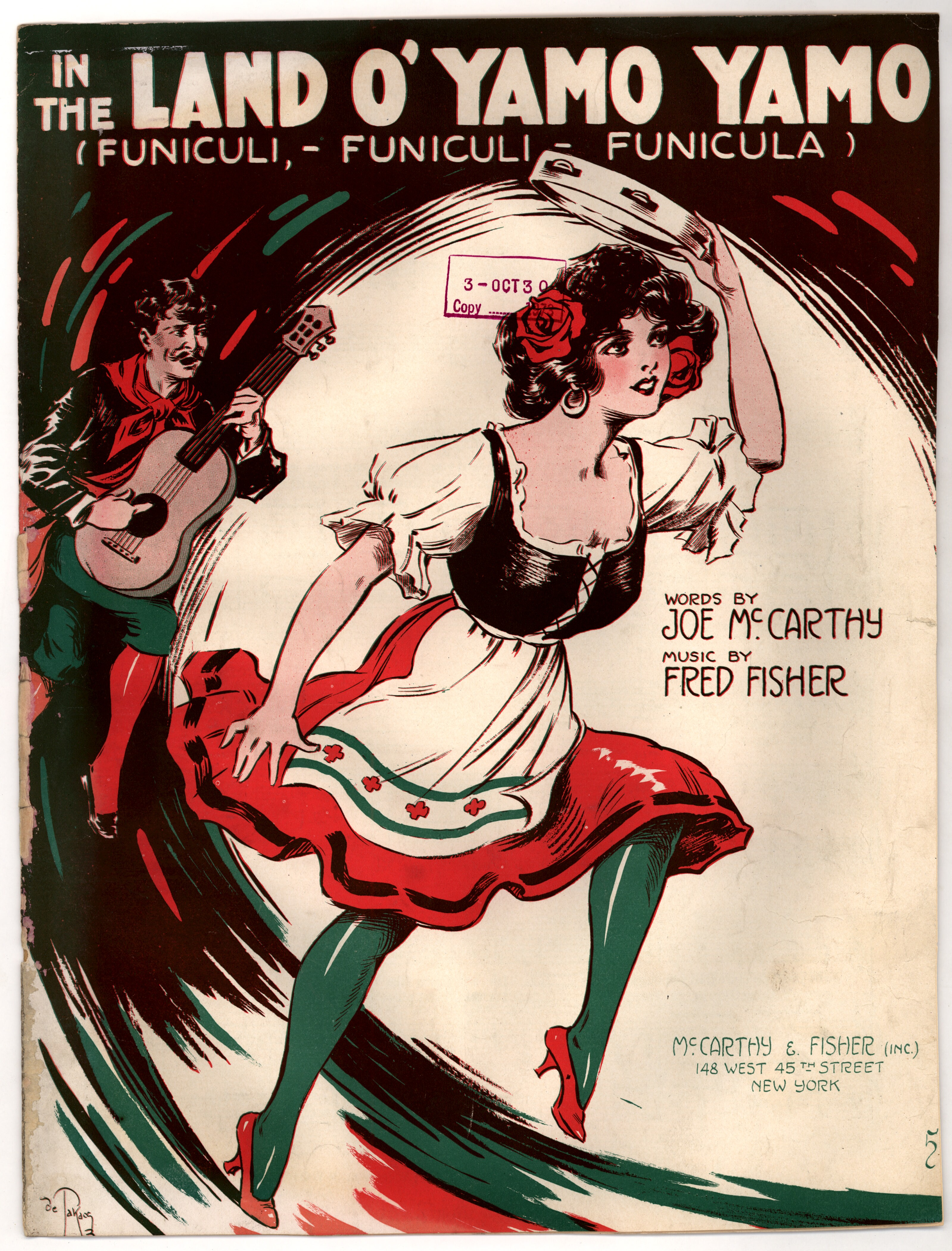
- Cover of the sheet music for "In the Land O' Yamo Yamo"

Song
- Published: 1917
- Label: Victor
- Songwriter(s): Composer: Fred Fischer; Lyricist: Joe McCarthy
- Producer(s): McCarthy & Fisher, Inc.

In the Land O' Yamo Yamo is a World War I song written in 1917. Joe McCarthy wrote the lyrics and Fred Fisher composed the music. McCarthy & Fisher, Inc. produced the song in New York, New York. On the cover of the sheet music is a man playing the guitar as a woman dances in the foreground. The lyrics describe a place that is not found on the map, but resembles "Old Napoli," referring to a city in Italy. "Yamo Yamo" is an English transliteration of the Neapolitan phrase "iammo, iammo", a dialectal reduction of "andiamo, andiamo" ("let's go, let's go") and the beginning of the chorus of the worldwide popular Italian song "Funiculì, Funiculà", which is mentioned in "Yamo Yamo"'s subtitle. "Yamo Yamo" is illustrated in the chorus as a place where the "good fellows are" and where "you can never hear them talk about the war." The song reached number two on the US song charts in May 1918.
