= Joan of Arc, They Are Calling You =

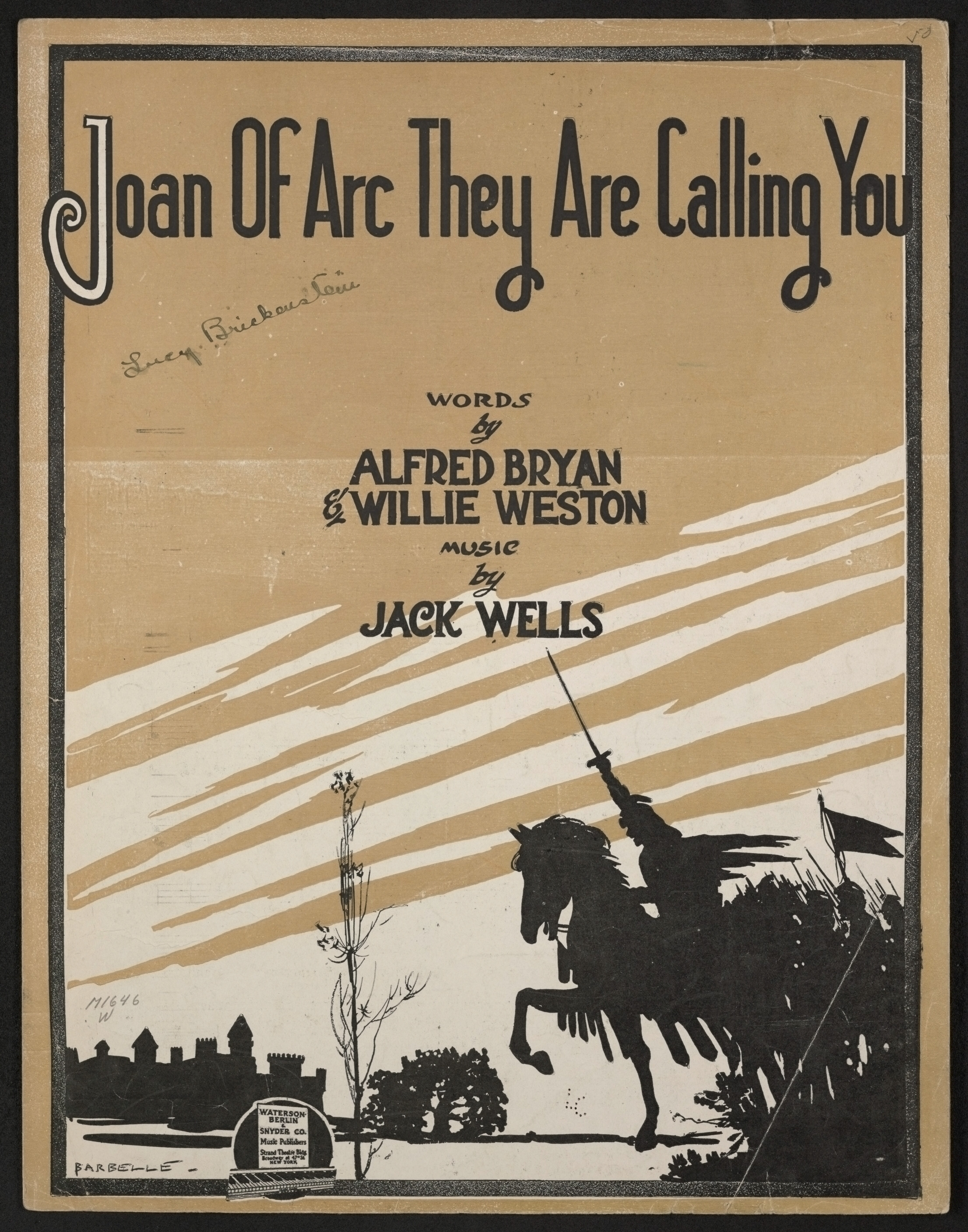
- Cover of sheet music for WWI song "Joan of Arc, They are calling you"

Song
- Language: English and French
- Published: 1917
- Songwriter(s): Composer: Jack Wells; Lyricist: Al Bryan and Willie Weston

"Joan of Arc, They Are Calling You" is a 1917 song composed by Jack Wells, and with lyrics written by Al Bryan and Willie Weston. It appeared in the contemporary musical production, This Way Out.

The sheet music was published by Waterson, Berlin & Snyder Co. in New York, New York. This song was written during World War I.

The cover art is of a woman riding a horse, holding her sword in the air. She is leading troops toward a castle. The lyrics are written in both English and French.

During World War I, it was common for French soldiers to carry an image of Joan of Arc when going into battle. Although she was not canonized a saint until 1920, Joan of Arc represented the devotion of the soldier who fought for France. The lyrics of the song portrays the French soldiers' calling out to Joan of Arc. The chorus reads:

"Joan of Arc, Joan of Arc,
Do your eyes, from the skies, see the foe?
Don't you see the drooping fleur-de-lis
Can't you hear the tears of Normandy?
Joan of Arc, Joan of Arc,
Let your spirit guide us through.
Come lead your France to victory;
Joan of Arc, they are calling you."
