= For Your Country and My Country =

1917 song written by Irving Berlin

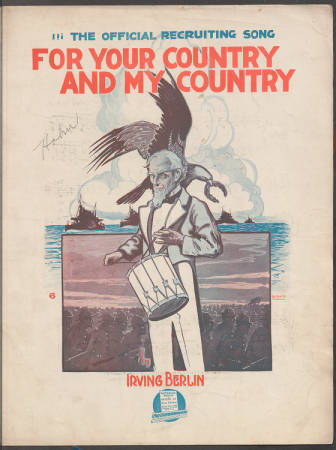
- Sheet music cover

Song by Conway's Band
- Released: 1917
- Recorded: July 9, 1917
- Genre: Popular music
- Length: 2:39
- Label: Victor
- Songwriter: Irving Berlin

"For Your Country and My Country" is a World War I era song released in 1917. Lyrics and music were written by Irving Berlin. The song was published by Waterson, Berlin & Snyder, Co. of New York, New York. Artist Albert Wilfred Barbelle designed the sheet music cover. It features Uncle Sam playing a snare drum with an eagle on his shoulder. In the background are ships sailing, and below are troops marching. Above the title, it reads, "The Official Recruiting Song." The song was written for voice and piano, along with chords for guitar, ukulele, and banjo.

On July 9, 1917, Conway's Band recorded the song with conductor Patrick Conway. It was released under the Victor record label. The Peerless Quartet also recorded a version of the song in 1917. It was released under Columbia Records. Opera singer Frances Alda recorded the song, and it was released by Victor Records. The song was featured in the 1943 musical film This Is the Army, and performed by Frances Langford and ensemble.

The sheet music can be found at Pritzker Military Museum & Library.

== Analysis ==
The lyrics are a "call to action" to men, asking them to join the army. The chorus is as follows:

t's your country, it's my country
With millions of real fighting men
It's your duty and my duty
To speak with the sword, not the pen
If Washington were living today
With sword in hand he'd stand up and say
For Your Country and my country
I'll do it all over again
