= Van and Schenck =

American entertainers

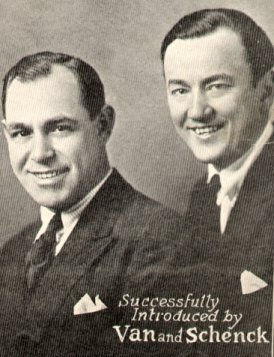
Van and Schenck.

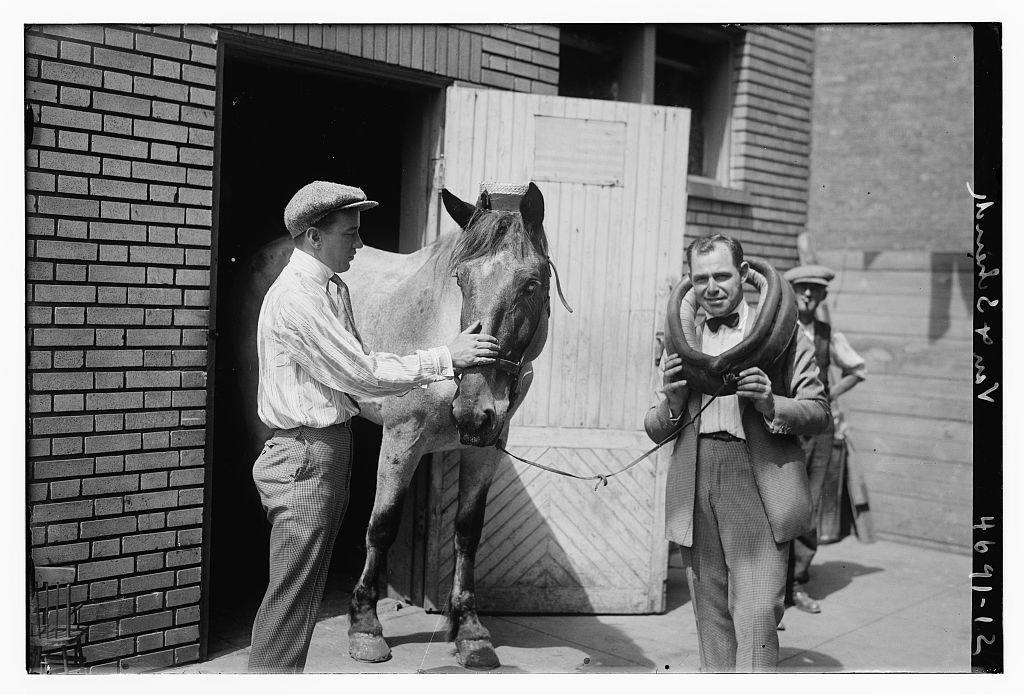
Van and Schenck horsing around in 1918

Van and Schenck were popular American entertainers in the 1910s and 1920s: Gus Van (born August Von Glahn, August 12, 1886 – March 12, 1968), baritone, and Joe Schenck (pronounced "skenk"; born Joseph Thuma Schenck, (June 2, 1891– June 28, 1930), tenor. They were vaudeville stars and made appearances in the Ziegfeld Follies of 1918, 1919, 1920 and 1921. They made numerous phonograph records for the Emerson, Victor, and Columbia record companies.

== History ==
With Schenck on piano, the duo sang and performed comedy routines. Van was especially adept at dialect humor, and could imitate any number of regional and continental accents. One of the team's typical novelty hits was Pastafazoola, in praise of Italian food and sung in the appropriate style. Van's hearty baritone and Schenck's high tenor harmonized well, and the team became known as "the pennant-winning battery of songland." They performed on radio shows and appeared in early talking motion pictures, including several musical shorts—in both Vitaphone and MGM Movietone—and one feature, the MGM film They Learned About Women (1930).

During World War I, they recorded humorous songs such as "I Don't Want to Get Well" which told the tale of a wounded soldier who did not want to recover, as he was comfortable in hospital and in love with a nurse.

After Schenck's death in 1930 of heart disease, Van continued to perform as a solo artist on stage, screen, and radio. He appeared in many New York-produced Soundies in 1941. Schenck was buried in The Cemetery of the Evergreens in Brooklyn.

Van and Schenck gained a modern-day resurgence after their 1920 recording of Irving Berlin's "After You Get What You Want, You Don't Want It" was sampled in the soundtrack of the indie video game Pizza Tower.

== Selected discography ==
Carolina in the Morning - Van and Schenck
Van and Schenck's 1922 recording of Carolina in the Morning, which was one of the best selling recordings of 1923

- "It's Been a Long, Long Time Since I've Been Home" (1916)
- "Hawaiian Sunshine" (1916)
- "For Me and My Gal" (1917)
- "Yaddie Kaddie Kiddie Kaddie Koo" (1917)
- "Huckleberry Finn" (1917)
- "That's How You Can Tell They're Irish" (1917)
- "My Little China Doll" (1917)
- "Mother, May I Go in to Swim?" (1917)
- "Dance and Grow Thin" (1917)
- "There's Something Nice about the South" (1917)
- "Far Away in Honolulu" (1917)
- "Mulberry Rose" (1917)
- "The Ragtime Volunteers are Off to War" (1917)
- "I Don't Want to Get Well" (1917)
- "Southern Gals" (1917)
- "I Miss the Old Folks Now" (1917)
- "In the Land O' Yamo Yamo" (1917)
- "Where Do They Get 'Em and How Do They Get 'Em?" (1918)
- "My Mind's Made Up to Marry Carolina" (1918)
- "Ragtime Moses Old-Time Bomboshay" (1918)
- "I Always Think I'm Up in Heaven" (1918)
- "Tackin 'Em Down" (1918)
- "They Were All Out of Step But Jim" (1918)
- "Why Do They Call Them Babies?" (1918)
- "You'll Always Find A Lot of Sunshine in My Old Kentucky Home" (1918)
- "You'll Find Old Dixieland in France" (1918)
- "Oh, How She Can Sing" (1919)
- "Mandy" (1919)
- "Open Up The Golden Gates To Dixieland" (1919)
- "Sweet Kisses" (1919)
- "They're All Sweeties" (1919)
- "After You Get What You Want, You Don't Want It" (1920)
- "All The Boys Love Mary" (1920)
- "In Napoli" (1920)
- "You Tell 'em" (1920)
- "Ain't We Got Fun" (1921)
- "Ain't You Coming Out Malinda?" (1921)
- "All She'd Say Was Umh Hum" (1921)
- "O'Reilly (I'm Ashamed of You)" (1921)
- "She Walks in Her Husband's Sleep" (1921)
- "Sweet Love" (1921)
- "What's A Gonna Be Next?" (1921)
- "Who's Been Around" (1921)
- "Carolina in The Morning" (1923)
- "Steamboat Sal" (1923)
- "You Tell Her-I Stutter" (1923)
- "Away Down East in Maine" (1923)
- "Take 'em To The Door Blues" (1925)
- "Everything is Hotsy-Totsy Now" (April 15, 1925)
- "That Red Head Gal" (1923)
- "Magnolia" (1927)
- "Pastafazoola" (1927)
- "Stay Out of the South" (1929)
