= Hock the Kaiser! =

"Hock The Kaiser!"

Song
- Language: English
- Published: 1917
- Songwriter(s): James H. Hall

"Hock The Kaiser!" is a World War I novelty song written and composed by James H. Hall in 1917. It targets the German emperor Wilhelm II of Germany. The work was self-published by James H. Hall in Chicago, Illinois.

The sheet music can be found at the Pritzker Military Museum & Library and at the Library of Congress. The song begins, "Kaiser Bill, he had a dream that all the world he'd rule; Made a great big submarine with Uncle Sam to fool. Uncle Sam is riled enough to show'em where we stand, He will do some fighting, and will lick that German Band."
