= Somewhere in France Is Daddy =

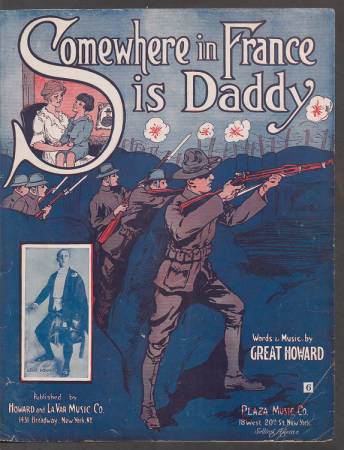

Song
- Released: 1917
- Label: Howard & LaVar Music, Co.
- Songwriter(s): "Great Howard" (Howard Miller)

"Somewhere in France Is Daddy" is a World War I era song released in 1917. Lyrics and music were written by "Great Howard," otherwise known as Howard Miller. It was published by Howard & LaVar Music Co. of New York, New York. There are two versions of the sheet music cover. Both feature a mother holding a child, soldiers firing from a trench, and an inset photo of Great Howard. The latter version is a darker blue and the photo is of Howard in kilts. The song was written for both voice and piano.

The sheet music can be found at Pritzker Military Museum & Library.

The song is about a young boy whose father is fighting in the war. He asks his mother questions about his father's participation in the war, which appears difficult for her to answer. She is overcome with emotion, but her son comforts her. The chorus is as follows:

Somewhere in France is Daddy
Somewhere in France is he
Fighting for home and country
Fighting my lad for liberty
I pray ev'ry night for Allies
And ask God to help them win
For our Dad won't come back
till the Stars and Stripes they'll tack on
Kaiser William's flag staff in Berlin
