= Over in Hero-Land =

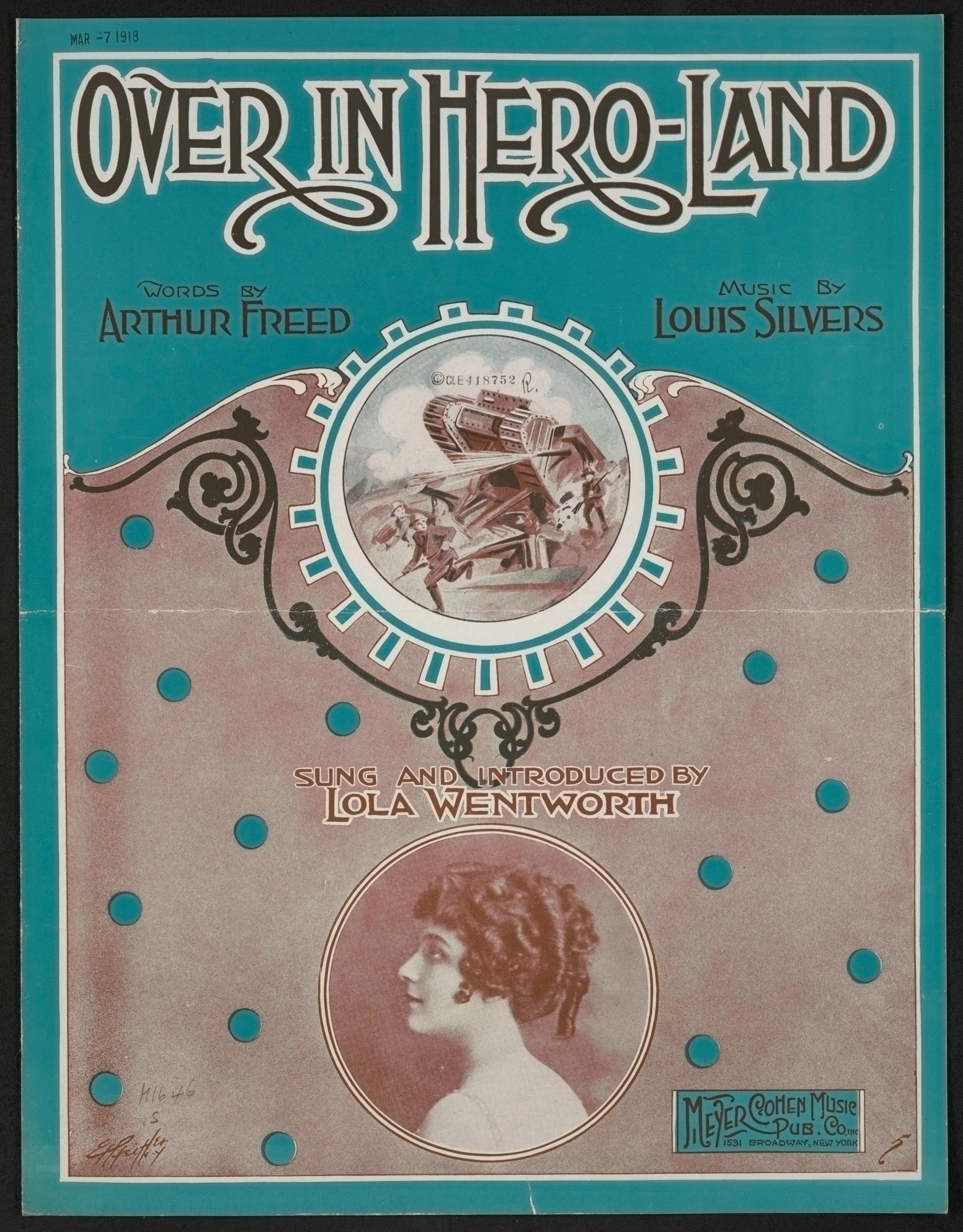

Song
- Released: 1918
- Composer(s): Louis Silvers
- Lyricist(s): Arthur Freed

"Over in Hero-Land" is a World War I era song released in 1918. Arthur Freed wrote the lyrics. Louis Silvers composed the music. Meyer Cohen Music of New York, New York published the song. It was written for voice and piano. The cover was designed by E. Pfeiffer. It features a drawing of a tank firing at soldiers. Below it is a picture of Lola Wentworth, who performed the song.

The song chronicles the departure of a soldier from his significant other. The woman is full of heartache, but is also proud of "her soldier boy." In order to comfort herself she repeats a prayer, which is the chorus:

Over in Hero-Land,
Angels above
Hold out a helping hand
Watch him I love,
Tell him my lonesome heart
Sends this command,
Come back to me, Sweetheart
From Hero-Land

The sheet music can be found at the Library of Congress and Pritzker Military Museum & Library.
