= Lily Lian =

French singer (1917–2020)

- Born: Liliane Lebon; 1 May 1917
- Died: 24 May 2020 (aged 103); Ivry-sur-Seine, France
- Occupation: Singer

Liliane Lebon (1 May 1917 – 24 May 2020), known professionally as Lily Lian, was a French singer, who is considered to have been one of the last street singers of Paris. After her career went into decline, she attempted to get by as a record label singer, where she made the acquaintance of Édith Piaf, Tino Rossi, Maurice Chevalier, and Yves Montand. She helped jumpstart the career of Pascal Sevran, who hosted her on his show numerous times.

== Biography ==
Prior to the existence of jukeboxes, phonographs, or radio, street singing was a very popular profession in France. Born on 1 May 1917, Lian began her career as a street singer in the 1930s. She was one of the most well-known people in the profession and drew many large crowds. However, due to World War II and the rise of radio, Lian attempted a career as a record label singer, but failed to break through. For two years, she was the mistress of actor and music composer Vincent Scotto. In 1965, she helped mentor a young singer named Pascal Régent, who later became a renowned composer and television show host under the name Pascal Sevran. Lian made numerous appearances on his show, titled La Chance aux chansons, and she was presented as the last street singer.

Lily Lian died on 24 May 2020 in Ivry-sur-Seine at the age of 103.

== Works ==
- Lady Paname, Mémoires de la dernière chanteuse des rues (1981)
