= There's a Garden of Crosses in No Man's Land =

Song
- Language: English
- Published: 1918
- Songwriter(s): Composer: Gus Wackrow; Lyricist: Wm. Robinson

There's a Garden of Crosses in No Man's Land is a World War I song written by William Robinson and composed by Gus Wackrow. The song was published in 1918 by the Elite Publishing Company in Boston, MA.

The sheet music cover depicts Lady Liberty holding a laurel wreath over a cemetery with barbed wire.

== Bibliography ==
- Parker, Bernard S. World War I Sheet Music 2. Jefferson: McFarland & Company, Inc., 2007. ISBN 978-0-7864-2798-7. OCLC 71790113
- Vogel, Frederick G. World War I Songs: A History and Dictionary of Popular American Patriotic Tunes, with Over 300 Complete Lyrics. Jefferson: McFarland & Company, Inc., 1995. ISBN 0-89950-952-5. OCLC 32241433
