= George Fairman =

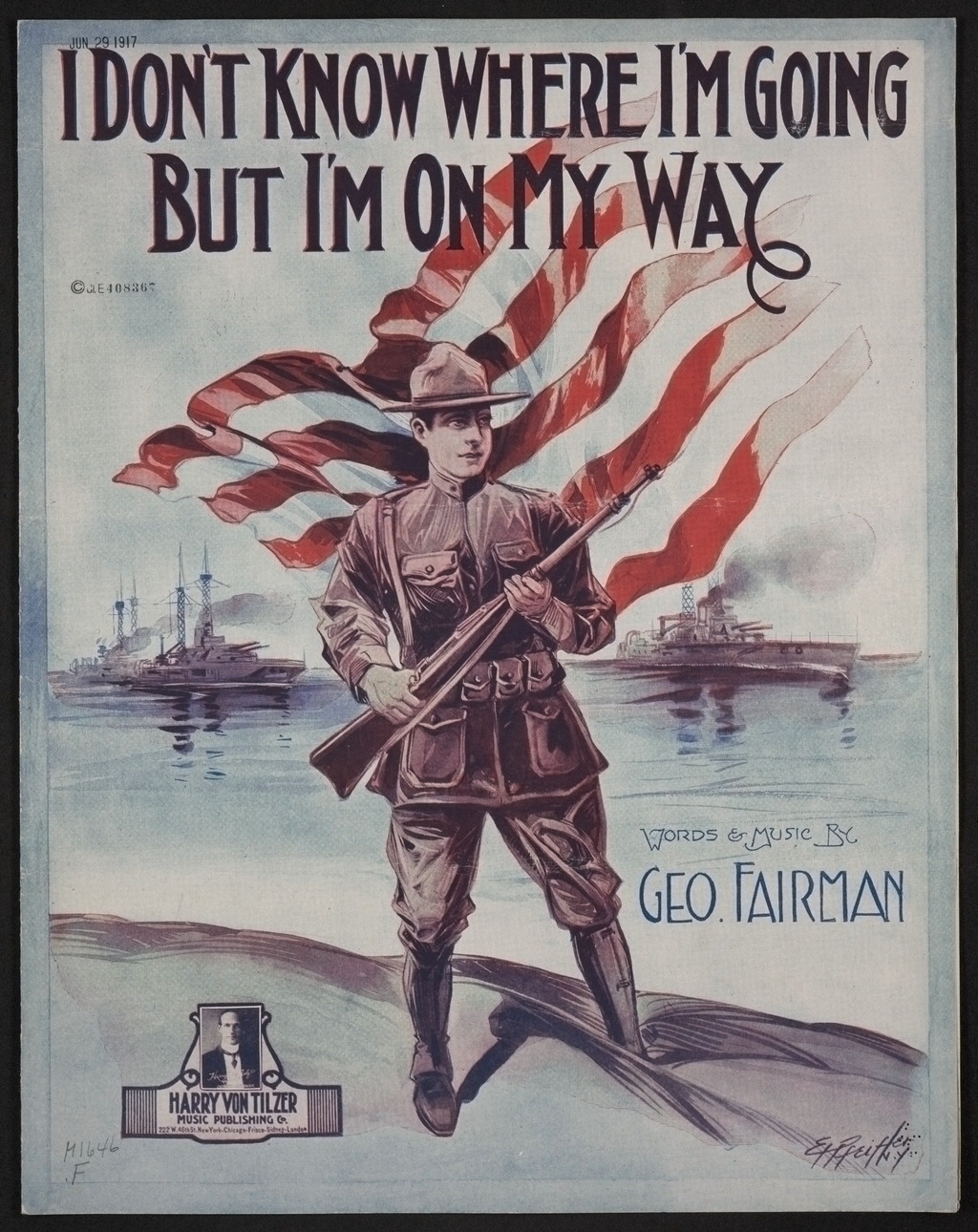
Record cover

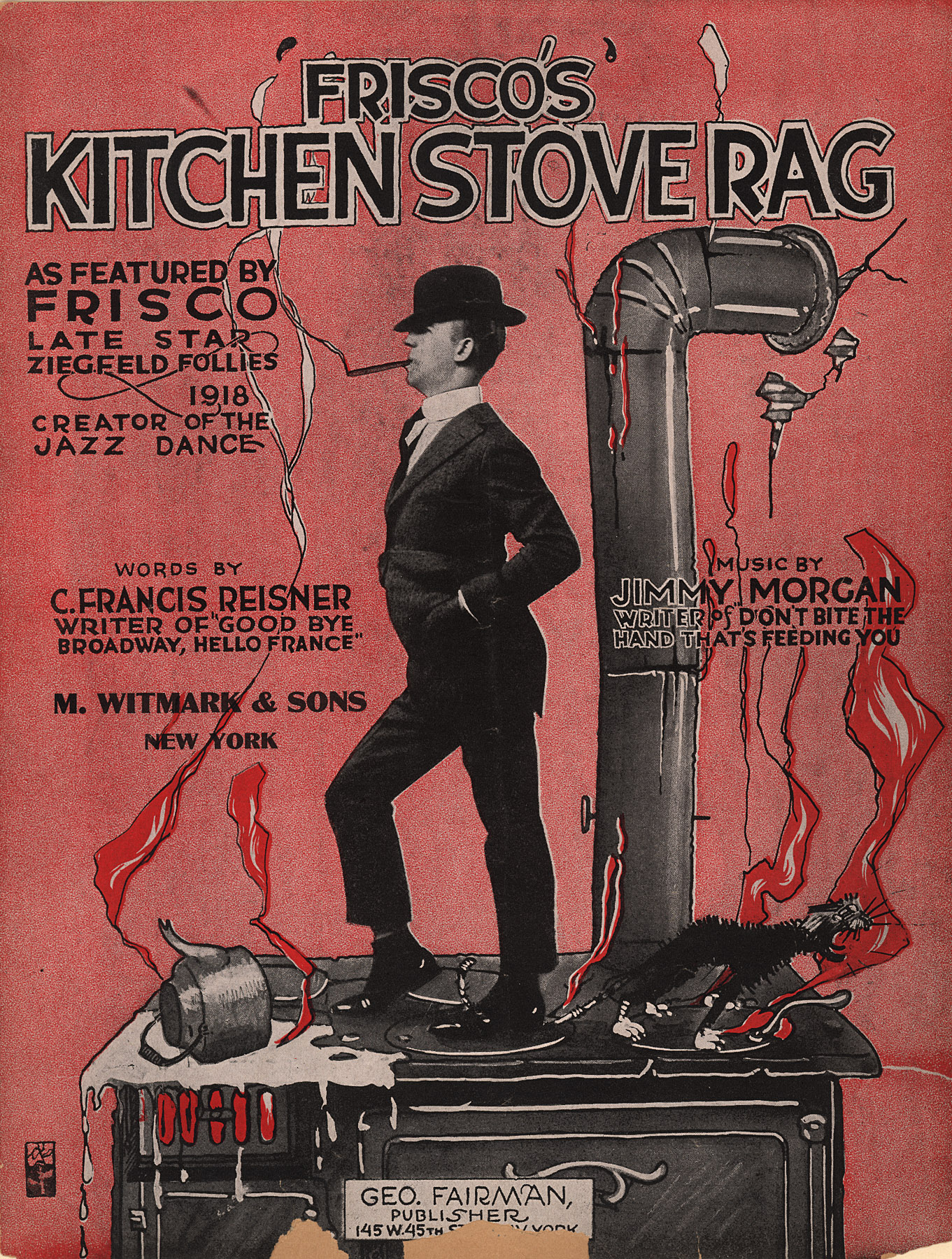
Music published by Fairman

George Wayne Fairman (1881–1962) was a lyricist, composer, and music publisher whose work includes popular songs. Several of his songs charted including two that reached #1. Fairman's work includes coon songs, ragtime, songs related to World War I, and a foxtrot.

The Peerless Quartet recorded his song "I think we've got another Washington and Wilson is his name" in 1916 on Silvertone Records.

== Songs ==
- "Bugavue Rag" (1902)
- "Preacher and the Bear" (1904)
- "Fever's on" (1906)
- "Fare-Thee-Well" (1909), with Tell Taylor
- "Way Down South" (1912)
- "I Think We've Got Another Washington (and Wilson Is His Name)" (1915)
- "I Don't Know Where I'm Going But I'm On My Way (1917)
- "Good-bye My Rosary" (1917)
- "Hello America, hello!" (1917)
- "When You Find There's Someone Missing" (1917), words by Joe McCarthy
- "Here's to Your Boy and My Boy" (1918)
- "It's All Over Now" (1918)
- "He's a Better Man Than You Kaiser Bill" (1918)
- "Bo-La-Bo" (1919), a fox trot
- "Syncopated Butterfly" (1922) published by Jack Mills Inc., New York
- "Syncopated Polish Dance" (1922)
- "Silence 'N Fun" (1923)
- "Syncopated Scarf Dance" (1923)
- "Minuet In Blue" (1928)
