= Liberty Forever! =

Song by The Victor Military Band
- Released: 1918
- Label: Victor
- Songwriter(s): Halsey K. Mohr & Joe Goodwin

Liberty Forever! is a World War I song, performed by The Victor Military Band. It was released in 1918 under the label Victor. In July 1918, it reached the number six spot on the US song charts.
