= They All Sang "Annie Laurie" (the Song That Reaches Ev'ry Heart) =

"They All Sang 'Annie Laurie' (the Song That Reaches Ev'ry Heart)"
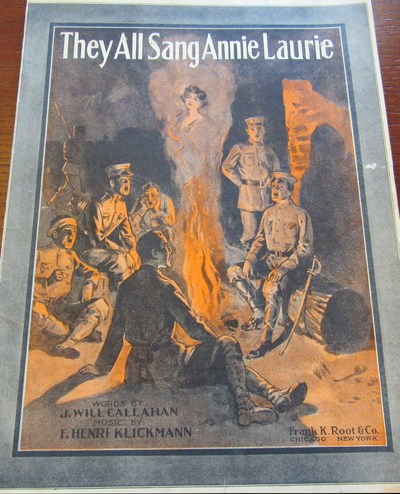

Song
- Released: 1915
- Label: Frank K. Root & Co.
- Songwriters: Composer: F. Henri Klickmann; Lyricist: J. Will Callahan

"They All Sang 'Annie Laurie' (the Song That Reaches Ev'ry Heart)" is a World War I era song released in 1915. J. Will Callahan wrote the lyrics. F. Henri Klickmann composed the music. The song was published by Frank K. Root & Co. of Chicago, Illinois. On the cover of the sheet music is a group of soldiers singing around a camp fire. The image of a woman can be seen forming in the smoke. The song was written for voice and piano.

The song starts with group of soldiers gathered around a camp fire. They each are struggling with feelings of loneliness, and are missing their significant others back at home. One of the soldiers, tearing up, suggests they sing a song. In the end, they sing the Scottish song "Annie Laurie" together. The chorus is as follows:

There was one song of Nora,
darling from Tipperary, so far away
And there was one song of English Mary
With blue eyes so bright and gay
And then from each throat
One song came ringing
That caused the tears from their eyes to start
For they all sang "Annie Laurie"
The song that reaches ev'ry heart

The sheet music can be found at Pritzker Military Museum & Library.
