= I Don't Know Where I'm Going But I'm On My Way =

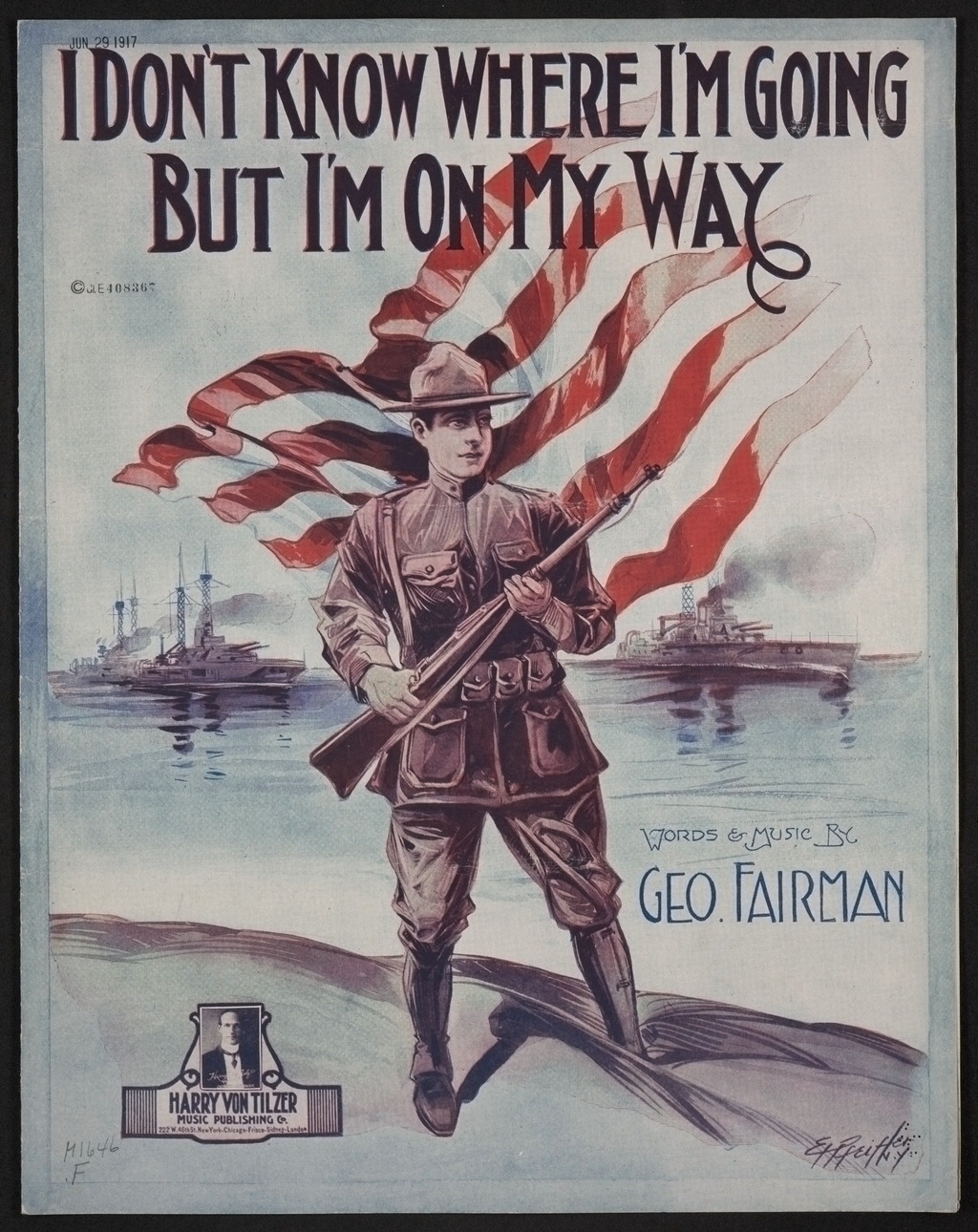

Song
- Written: 1910s
- Songwriter(s): George Fairman

"I Don't Know Where I'm Going But I'm On My Way" is a World War I era song, in which a soldier leaving to fight sings that "Uncle Sammy is calling me, so I must go." It was written and composed by George Fairman, recorded by both the Peerless Quartet and Henry Burr, and produced by Harry Von Tilzer Music Publishing Company in 1917. The song stayed in the top 20 from September 1917 to January 1918 and hit number 9 in December 1917.

== Lyrics ==
Goodbye ev'rybody, I'm off to fight the foe.
Uncle Sammy is calling me, so I must go.
Gee, I'm feeling fine,
Don't you wish that you were me?
For I'm sailing tomorrow
Over the deep blue sea.

CHORUS
And I don't know where I'm going,
but I'm on my way,
For I belong to the regulars
I'm proud to say
And I'll do my duty night or day.
I don't know where I'm going,
But I'm on my way.

Take a look at me,
I'm a Yankee thro' and thro'.
I was born on July the Fourth in ninety-two,
And I'll march away with a feather in my hat,
For I'm joining the army.
What do you think of that?

REPEAT CHORUS
