= Dona Massin =

- Born: 18 February 1917; Winnipeg, Manitoba, Canada
- Died: 26 May 2001 (aged 84); Malibu, California, US
- Occupation: film choreographer

Dona Massin /ˈdɒnə ˈmeɪsɪn/ (born 18 February 1917–26 May 2001) was a film choreographer best known for her work on the 1939 film version of The Wizard of Oz. Dona Massin appeared in over 100 films throughout her career.

== Early years ==
Dona Massin's family moved to Los Angeles, California when she was eight years old. She started her show business career as a child. Also at the age of eight, she sang My Man at the Mayan Theater in Los Angeles and received a standing ovation. She then was discovered by Maurice Kosell and was given free dancing lessons due to her natural talent.

At the age of 14, Dona was signed to MGM Studios and worked on many of the musicals. She also worked at 20th Century Fox, Universal, Warner Bros. and Columbia Pictures.

== The Wizard of Oz ==
In 1939, at the age of 21, Massin was signed to production of The Wizard of Oz, where she worked as a choreographer assisting Bobby Connolly. The film took 6 months to complete.

Dona was the first to sing the song "Over The Rainbow", and it was she who pushed for the song to be in the film. She also originated the skip that was performed down the yellow brick road. The skip is a ballet step called pas de basque however, Massin had it executed at a quicker speed than was usual for the step. In the film itself, Massin can be seen grooming the Lion in the scene at the beauty shop. Mervyn Leroy put her in that part to bring good luck to the film.

== Personal life ==
Dona Massin married Don Carn and had one daughter, Jodie Carn, who is a talk show host on Jodie L.A.and Jodie in Malibu. Jodie, filmed in Los Angeles. She retired from show business at the age of 30 to be a wife and mother. In Dona's later years, she and daughter Jodie would visit the Wizard of Oz Festivals in Chesterton, Indiana, Wisconsin, and Chicago. With Dona were some of the little people from the film.

In 2001, she taped Memories of Oz, portraying herself in the production. Also in 2001, she appeared in the television special Last Days of Judy Garland (also portraying herself) and "The E! True Hollywood Story". Towards the end of her life, she gave interviews for both books and television. Dona died from natural causes. She had been residing in Malibu, California with her daughter Jodie.
