= Say a Prayer for the Boys "Out There" =

Song
- Released: 1917
- Composer: Alex Marr
- Lyricist: Bernie Grossman

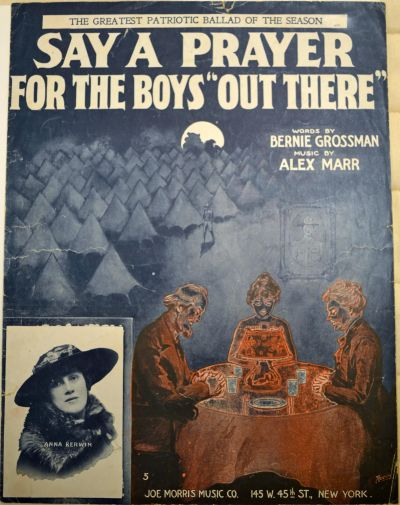
Found at Pritzker Military Museum & Library; inset photo of Anna Kerwin

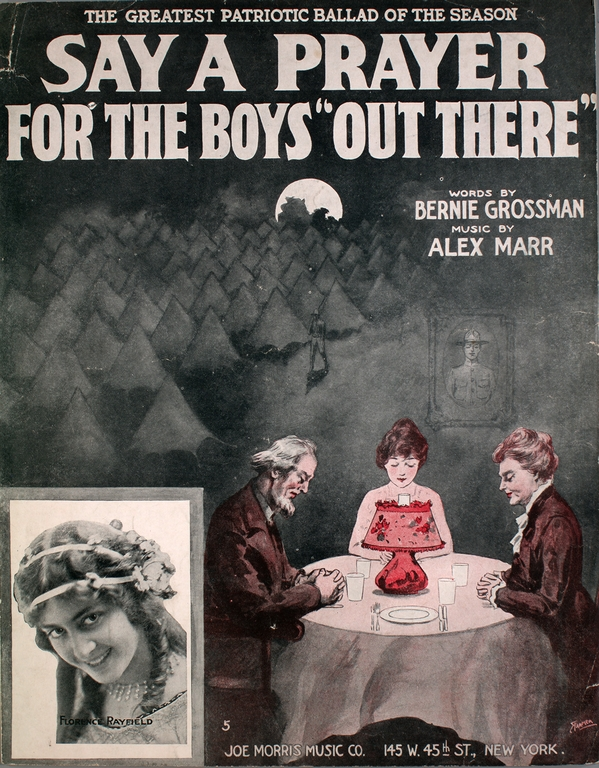
Inset photo of Florence Rayfield

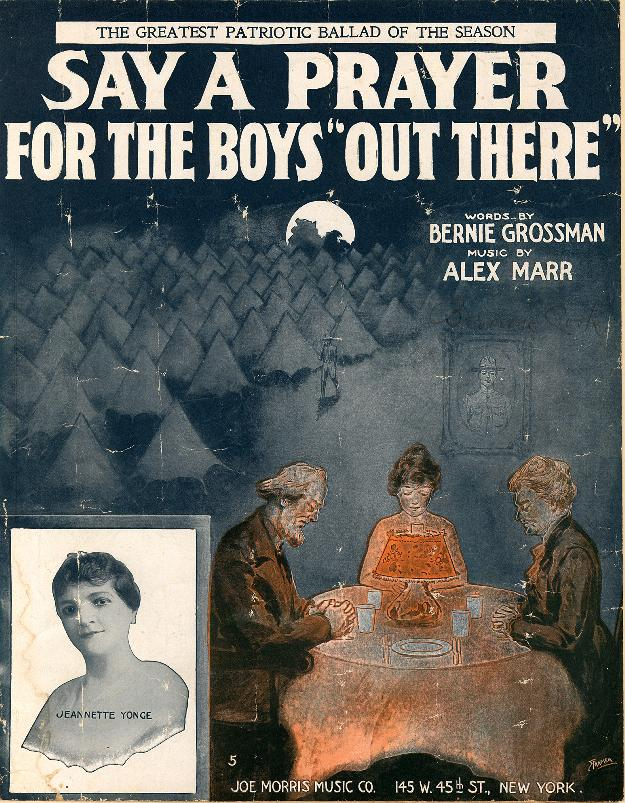
Inset photo of Jeanette Yonge

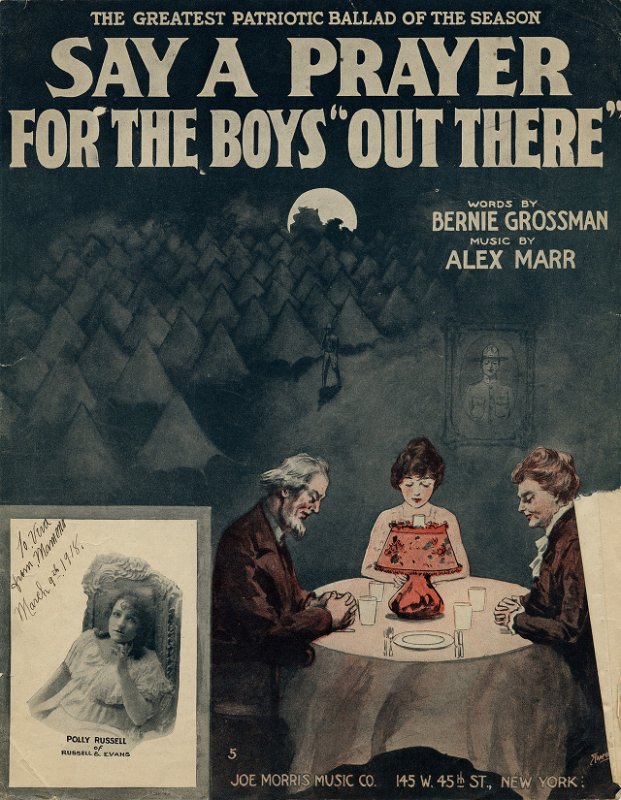
Inset photo of Polly Russell

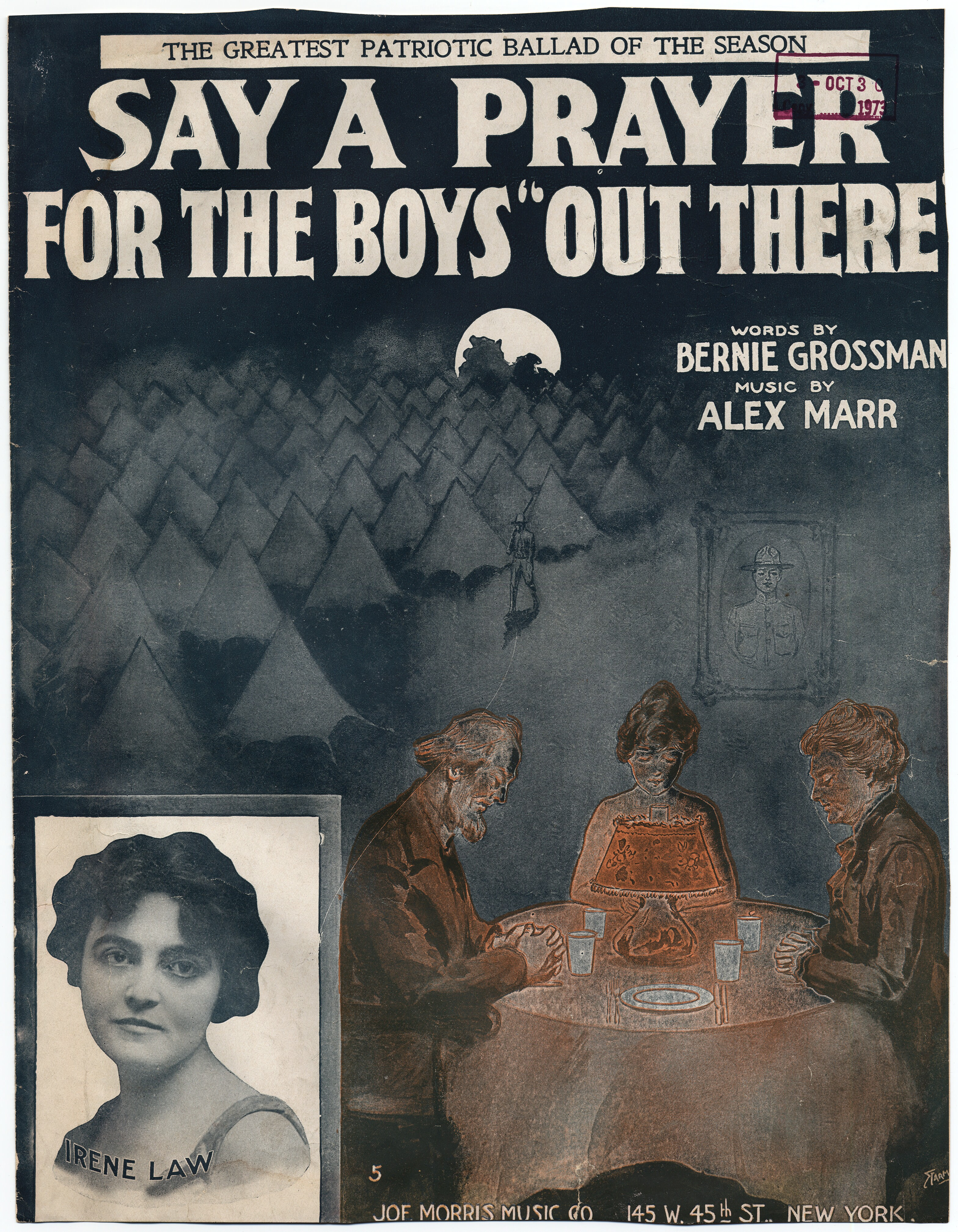
Inset photo of Irene Law

"Say a Prayer for the Boys "Out There"" is a World War I era song released in 1917. Bernie Grossman wrote the lyrics. Alex Marr composed the music. It was published by Joe Morris Music, Co. of New York, New York. The sheet music cover was designed by the Starmer Brothers. It features a family praying at the dinner table. Behind them is a sentry guarding a campground of tents. There is an inset photo on the left side that varies per edition. The song was written for both voice and piano.

It was recorded by artists Bob Hall and the Peerless Quartet.

The sheet music can be found at Pritzker Military Museum & Library.

== Lyrics ==
Verse 1:
A mighty nation hears a ringing call to arms,
A call that draws her sons from city, vale, and farm;
A nation sends the best of us across the sea,
That the rest of us forever may be free;
And while a mighty nation's heart will yearn,
Let's pray that they will soon return:

Chorus:
Won't you say a prayer for the boys out there,
For our heroes o'er the sea,
In that raging fray by night and day
They're fighting for you and me;
When they take their stand in No Man's Land,
We know they'll do their share;
So that we may live,
Their lives they give;
Say a prayer for the boys out there.

2nd Verse:
A nation's mighty voice will reach across the sea,
And cheer the hearts of those who fight for liberty;
A nation's prayers will help the weaker ones along,
And will strengthen them when everything goes wrong;
And while a nation's sons will do or die,
Let's call to the One upon high.
