= When the Clouds of War Roll By =

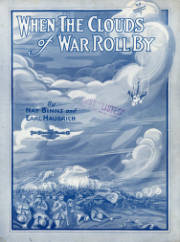
- Sheet music cover

Song
- Published: 1917
- Composer(s): Earl Haubrich
- Lyricist(s): Nat Binns

When the Clouds of War Roll By is a World War I song composed by Earl Haubrich with lyrics by Nat Binns. It was published in 1917 by Ted Browne Music Co. in Chicago, Illinois.

== Chorus ==
When the clouds of war roll by,
I'll come marching home to you.
Until then I'll bid goodbye,
Just say that you will be true blue.
Marching to victory
For true democracy;
Back, back to you I'll come,
When the clouds of war roll by.

This work can be found at the Pritzker Military Museum & Library.
