= When You Come Home (song) =

Song
- Released: 1918
- Label: Columbia

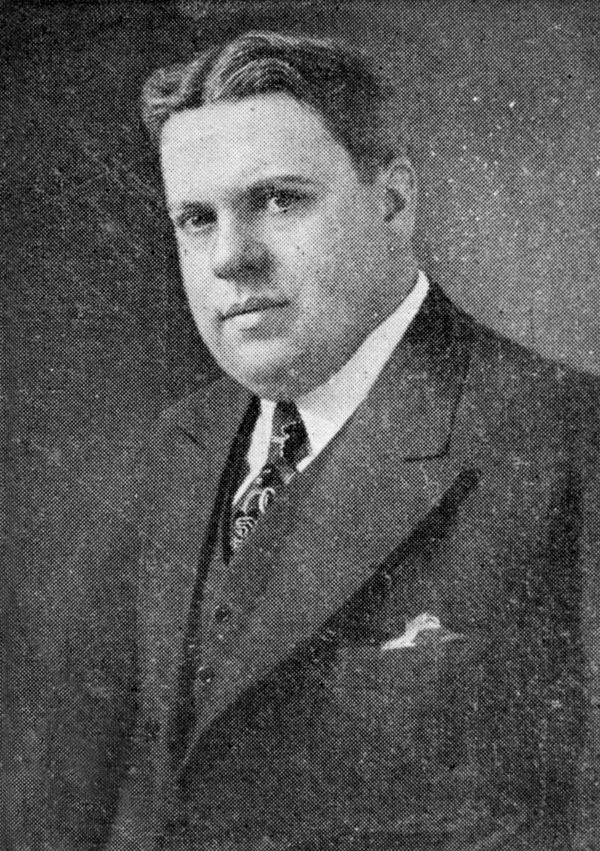
Vocalist Henry Burr 1918

When You Come Home is a World War I song. It was released in 1918 under Columbia Records. Vocalist Henry Burr performed the song. In August 1918, the song reached the number seven spot on the US song charts.
