= Someday They're Coming Home Again =

Song
- Published: 1917
- Songwriter(s): Harry Hilbert

"Someday They're Coming Home Again" is a 1917 song written during World War I. Lyrics and music was written by Harry Hilbert. The song was published by M. Witmark & Sons in New York City. The cover of the sheet music depicts a mounted officer leading a silhouette of marching soldiers. He is carrying a company flag.

The lyrics to "Someday They're Coming Home Again" cheers on the soldiers as they fight the war, and displays the pride of those waiting for them to come home. Part of the refrain goes:

"Somewhere the boys are fighting for you
Somewhere they're showing what they can do
Somewhere the boys are fighting for me
To make the name of Uncle Sam respected over the sea"
