= God Be with Our Boys Tonight =

1918 song written by Fred G. Bowles and composed by Wilfrid Sanderson

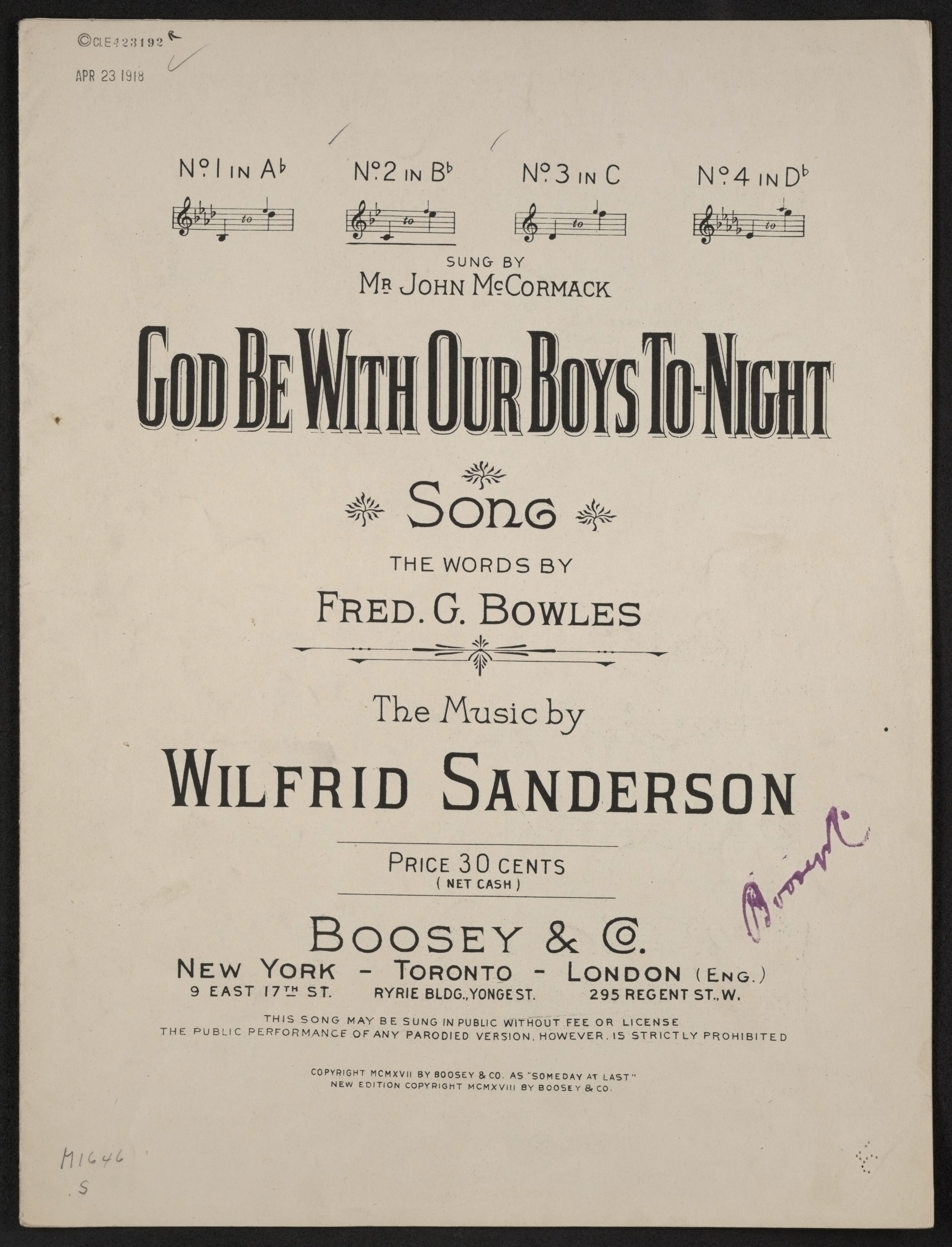
- Early sheet music cover

Song
- Published: 1918
- Composer(s): Wilfrid Sanderson
- Lyricist(s): Fred G. Bowles

"God Be with Our Boys Tonight" is a World War I–era song written by Wilfrid Sanderson and Fred G. Bowles in 1918. It reached number three on the US top 100 songs of June 1918.

The sheet music can be found at the Pritzker Military Museum & Library.

It was sometimes performed by Tiny Tim.
