= The Maid of the Mountains =

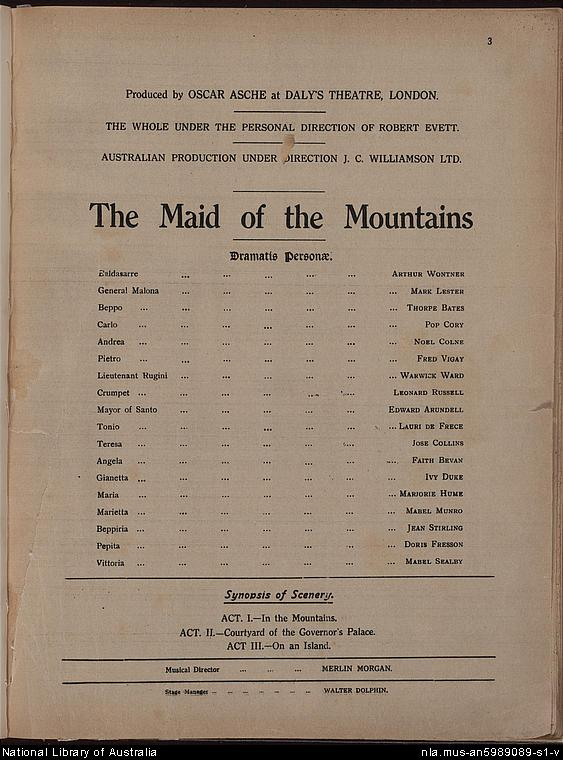
- Cast list from programme, 1917
- Music: Harold Fraser-Simson, with additional music by James W. Tate
- Lyrics: Harry Graham and additional lyrics by Frank Clifford Harris and Valentine
- Book: Frederick Lonsdale
- Premiere: 10 February 1917: Daly's Theatre, London
- Productions: 1917 West End

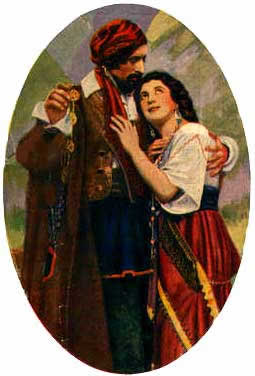
José Collins as Teresa

The Maid of the Mountains, called in its original score a musical play, is an operetta or "Edwardian" musical comedy in three acts. The music was by Harold Fraser-Simson with lyrics by Harry Graham; additional music by James W. Tate with additional lyrics by Frank Clifford Harris and Valentine; and book by Frederick Lonsdale. After an initial try-out at the Prince's Theatre in Manchester on 23 December 1916, the show was rewritten and opened at Daly's Theatre in London on 10 February 1917.

Produced by Robert Evett (after being turned down by Frank Curzon) and directed by Oscar Asche (who had directed the record-setting hit Chu Chin Chow), The Maid of the Mountains ran for 1,352 performances in its initial London run – closing mainly because of the nervous exhaustion of its female lead, José Collins. This highly profitable run saved the George Edwardes estate, then being managed by Evett, from bankruptcy.

The original New York production (1918) did not catch on, only running for 37 performances. However, Asche also directed the first Australian production for J. C. Williamson's in Australia in 1917, followed by another production in 1923. This became as successful as the London production, with soprano Gladys Moncrieff becoming famous as Teresa. The show had major London revivals in 1921, 1930, 1942 (starring Sylvia Cecil at the London Coliseum) and 1972 in an Emile Littler production at the Palace Theatre in the West End, and at the Finborough Theatre, London, in December 2006 with a cast including Anita Louise Combe, as well as numerous other professional productions elsewhere.

The musical was popular with amateur theatre groups, particularly in Britain, from the 1930s to about 1970.

== Background ==
The Maid of the Mountains was one of the three most important musical hits of the London stage during World War I (the other two being a revue entitled The Bing Boys Are Here and the musical Chu Chin Chow); music or scenes from all of these have been included as background in many films set in this period, and they remain intensely evocative of the "Great War" years. Other hit shows of the period were Theodore & Co (1916), The Boy (1917), and Yes, Uncle! (1917). Audiences wanted light and uplifting entertainment during the war, and these shows delivered it.

Some of the most popular songs were: "Love Will find a Way", "A Bachelor Gay", "A Paradise for Two", "My life is Love", and "Live for Today".

The "romantic" ending, with Teresa finally united to Baldassaré, was personally insisted on by José Collins (in the play as originally written, she ended up with the faithful but less colourful character of Beppo). Beppo and Teresa's duets remain, however, and the role of Baldassaré remains a non-singing part.

== Synopsis ==
The Maid of the Mountains is an escapist story set in a bandit camp, high up in the mountains (presumably in Italy). The bandit maid Teresa loves the bandit chief, Baldassaré, who is feared by the whole country. Baldassaré's men are unhappy because of the decision of Baldassaré to disband, and they ask Teresa to dissuade him. Baldassaré gives Teresa and the others their shares of the spoils of many raids. He tells her that she must leave at once, because their hiding place is surrounded. She pleads to be allowed to stay, but goes sadly. The local Governor, General Malona, captures Teresa and brings her to the Palace of Santo. He wishes to capture the rebel band before the impending end of his term of office. He promises Teresa her freedom if Baldassaré is captured. Teresa refuses, as "there is honour among thieves."

Meanwhile, Baldassaré and some of his band have seized the new Governor, Count Orsino. Donning the uniforms of the captives, the brigands proceed to Santo to rescue Teresa. Baldassaré meets and falls in love with Angela, the daughter of the retiring Governor, and becomes heedless of his danger in remaining in the town. He pretends to be the new governor. Beppo, one of the brigands who has always been in love with Teresa, asks her to persuade Baldassaré to leave the capital lest they all be discovered. Teresa, mad with jealousy because of Baldassaré's love for Angela, exposes the new "governor" as Baldassaré, and he and his companions are arrested and sent to Devil's Island.

Later, Teresa, who sadly regrets betraying Baldassaré, pleads with the General to release him. In the loneliness of his imprisonment, Baldassaré realises that his regard for Angela was only a passing infatuation, and that he loves Teresa. He forgives her betrayal of him and, with the assistance of Lieutenant Rugini, the Governor of the prison, they escape by boat. All ends happily for Teresa and her bandit chief.

== Roles and principal cast ==
- Teresa – José Collins
- Baldasarre – Arthur Wontner
- Gen. Malona – Mark Lester
- Tonio – Lauri de Frece
- Beppo – Thorpe Bates
- Carlo
- Andrea
- Pietro
- Lieutenant Rugini
- Crumpet
- Mayor of Santo
- Vittoria
- Angela
- Gianetta
- Maria
- Marietta
- Beppiria
- Pepita

== Musical numbers ==
Poster from an Australian production

All are by Fraser-Simpson and Graham, except as noted below:

- 1. "Friends Have to Part" – Opening Chorus
- 2. "Live for Today" – Beppo and chorus of men
- 3. "My Life Is Love" – Teresa, Beppo and bandits (Tate, Harris and Valentine)
- 4. "Nocturne - Orchestra Farewell" – Teresa
- 5. "Dividing the Spoils" – Chorus
- 6. "Finale Act I" – Company
- 7. "Introduction & Opening Chorus Act II"
- 8. "Love Will Find a Way" – Teresa
- 9. "Laughing Chorus Dirty Work" – Governor and Tonio
- 10. "A Paradise for Two" – Teresa and Beppo (Tate, Harris and Valentine)
- 11. "Husbands and Wives" – Vittoria and Tonio
- 12. "A Bachelor Gay" – Beppo (Tate, Harris and Valentine)
- 13. "Finale Act II"
- 14. "Opening Chorus Act III" – Chorus of Fisherfolk
- 15. "Good People Gather Round" – Governor, Teresa and Chorus
- 16. "When You're in Love" – Teresa and General Malona
- 17. "Over There and Over Here" – Vittorio and Tonio
- 18. "Finale Act III: Friendship and Love" – Teresa and Beppo

== Adaptations and recordings ==
The piece was adapted to a British film in 1932, directed by Lupino Lane. It starred Nancy Brown as Teresa and Harry Welchman as Baldasarre.

Merrick Farran orchestrated and conducted a recording with the Westminster Sinfonia in 1968; the singers include Leslie Fyson and The Rita Williams Singers.

== See also ==
- Maids of the Mountain Hockey Club
