= Goodbye, Ma! Goodbye, Pa! Goodbye, Mule, with Yer Old Hee-Haw! =

"Goodbye, Ma! Goodbye, Pa! Goodbye, Mule, with Yer Old Hee-Haw!: Long Boy"
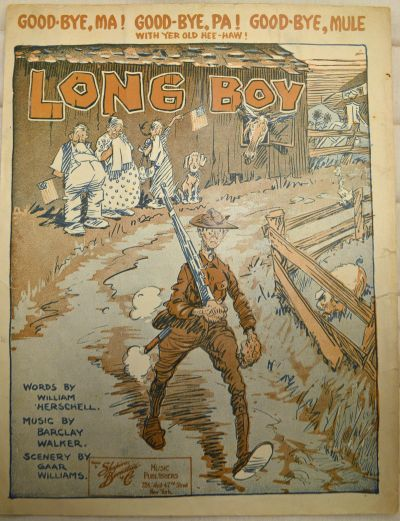
- Sheet music cover at the Pritzker Military Museum & Library

Song
- Released: 1917
- Label: Shapiro, Bernstein & Co.
- Songwriters: Composer: Barclay Walker; Lyricist: William Herschel

"Goodbye, Ma! Goodbye, Pa! Goodbye, Mule, with Yer Old Hee-Haw!", also known as "Long Boy", is a World War I era song released in 1917. William Herschel wrote the lyrics. Barclay Walker composed the music. It was published by Shapiro, Bernstein & Co. of New York, New York. Garr Williams designed the sheet music cover. It features a morose-looking cartoon soldier leaving his farm. Farm animals, the soldier's parents, and his girlfriend look on and wave flags. It was written for both voice and piano.

The lyrics take on a humorous tone. It tells the story of a very thin "country gink," who leaves his farm duties behind to enlist in the army. The chorus is his farewell to his parents and "sweetheart":

Good-by, Ma!
Good-by, Pa!
Goody-by Mule, with yer old hee haw!
I may not know what the war's about
But you bet, by gosh, I'll soon find out
An' o' Sweetheart, don't fear
I'll bring you a King fer a souvenir
I'll git you a Turk an' a Kaiser too
An' that's about all one feller could do!

The sheet music can be found at Pritzker Military Museum & Library.
