= Where Do We Go from Here? (1917 song) =

"Where Do We Go From Here?"

Song
- Language: English
- Published: 1917
- Songwriter(s): Composer: Percy Wenrich; Lyricist: Howard Johnson

Where Do We Go From Here? is a World War I song written by Howard Johnson and composed by Percy Wenrich. The song was first published in 1917 by Leo Feist, Inc., in New York, NY. The sheet music cover features a photo of Collins and Harlin.

The sheet music can be found at the Pritzker Military Museum & Library.
