= Out Where the West Begins =

1917 poem by Arthur Chapman

Out Where the West Begins: And Other Western Verses
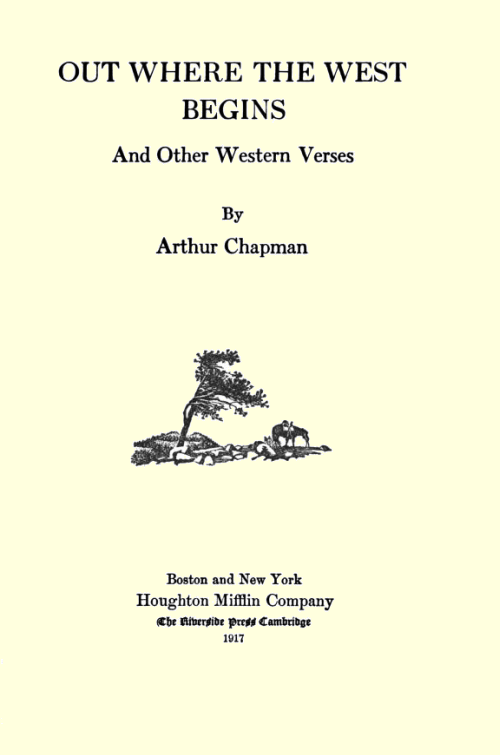
- Title page (1917)
- Author: Arthur Chapman
- Publisher: Houghton Mifflin Company
- Publication date: 1917

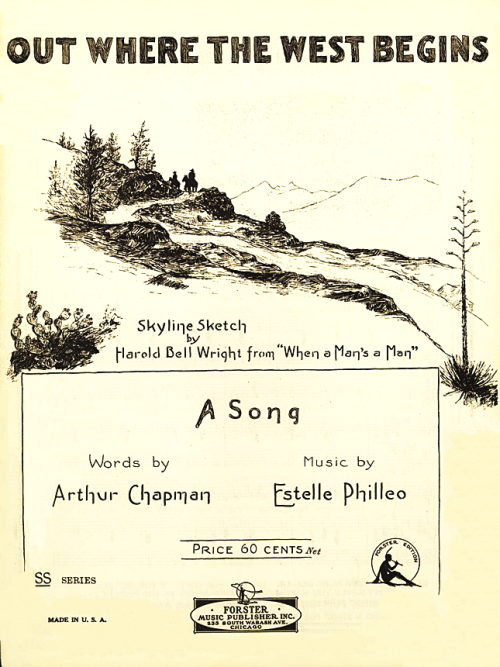
"Out Where The West Begins"—Cover of sheet music, 1920.

"Out Where the West Begins" is a poem written by Arthur Chapman and first published in his 1917 book of verse, Out Where the West Begins: And Other Western Verses. It is his most popular poem, still included in modern readings and compilations of Cowboy and Western poetry. The poem itself is about the wonders of nature, and is designed to create feelings of peace.

== Poem ==
The poem as written by Chapman:

Out where the handclasp's a little stronger,
Out where the smile dwells a little longer,

That's where the West begins;

Out where the sun is a little brighter,
Where the snows that fall are a trifle whiter,
Where the bonds of home are a wee bit tighter,

That's where the West begins.

Out where the skies are a trifle bluer,
Out where the friendship's a little truer,

That's where the West begins;

Out where a fresher breeze is blowing,
Where there's laughter in every streamlet flowing,
Where there's more of reaping and less of sowing,

That's where the West begins.

Out where the world is in the making,
Where fewer hearts in despair are aching,

That's where the West begins.

Where there's more of singing and less of sighing,
Where there's more of giving and less of buying,
Where a man makes a friend without half trying,

That's where the West begins.

== Bibliography ==
- Chapman, Arthur. Out Where the West Begins: And Other Western Verses. New York: Houghton Mifflin Company (1917).
- Chapman, Arthur (w.); Philleo, Estelle (m.). "Out Where The West Begins" (Sheet Music). Chicago: Forster Music Publisher, Inc. (1920).
