= When the Boys Come Home =

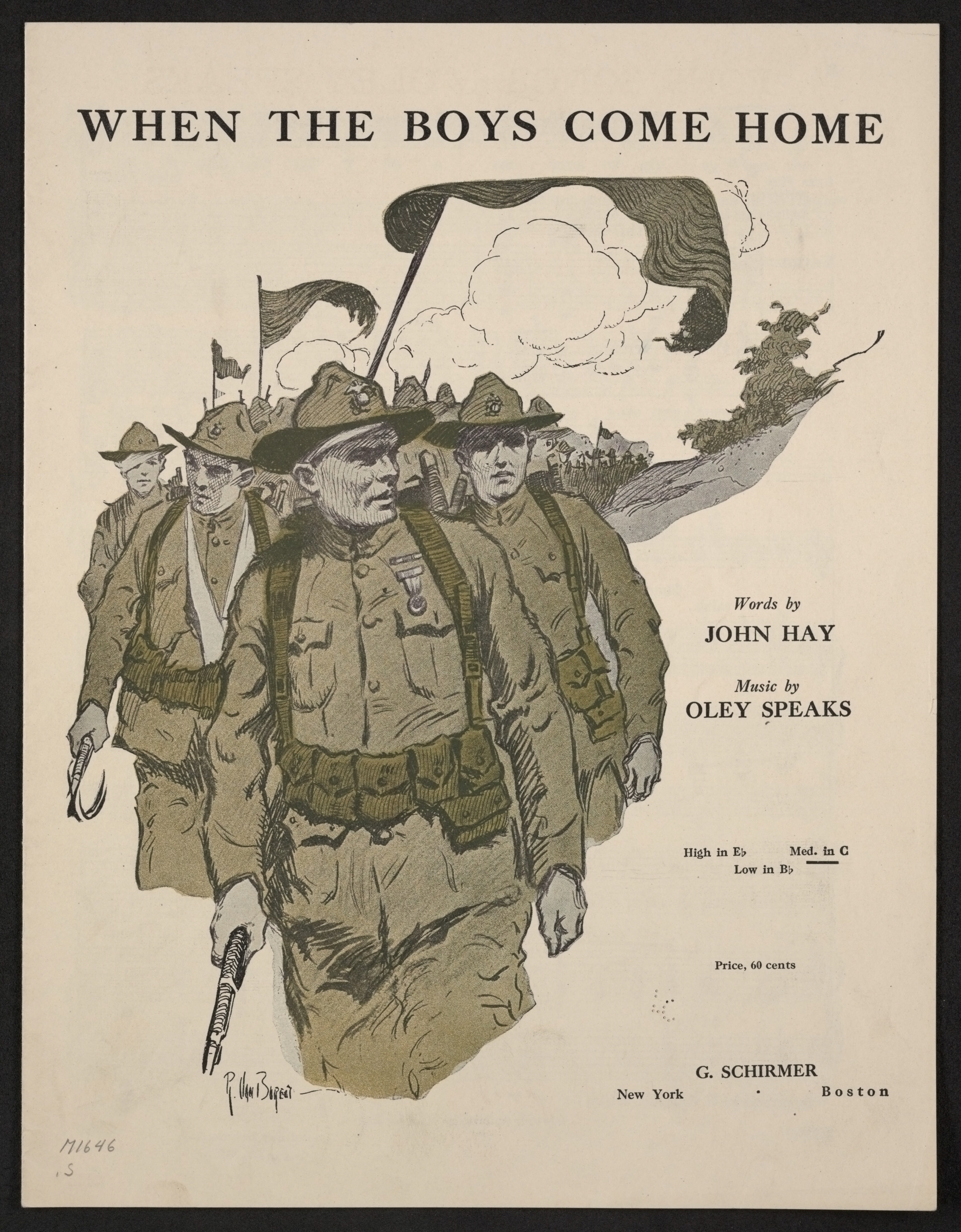
- Sheet music cover

Song
- Written: 1915
- Composer(s): Oley Speaks
- Lyricist(s): John Hay

"When the Boys Come Home" is a World War I song. It was first published as sheet music in 1915 with music by Oley Speaks and lyrics by John Hay.

== 1917 version ==
Oley Speaks composed the song. John Hay wrote the lyrics. The piece was written for both voice and piano. The song, written in first person, takes on a positive tone. The lyrics detail the happiness and celebration that will be felt when the soldiers return home from war.

Another song published in 1918 with the same name had lyrics by John Hay and music by Calvin W. Laufer.

== 1919 recording ==
The 1919 version was performed by Louis Graveure and recorded on February 13, 1919. The song was released by Columbia Records. It reached the number nine spot on the US song charts in June 1919.

== Notable performances ==
It was performed in Richfield, Utah in 1918 by Mrs. R. G. Clark. and in Allo Allo by Lieutenant Gruber.
