= Eventyr: Once Upon a Time =

Tone poem for orchestra composed by Frederick Delius

- After Asbjørnsen's Folklore
- by Frederick Delius
- Delius in 1907
- Composed: 1917
- Dedication: Henry Wood
- Performed: 11 January 1919: Queen's Hall, London
- Scoring: Picc. 2. 2. CA. 3. BsCl. 3. Sarrusophone—4.3.3.1-Timp. BD. Cym. Trgl. Tamt. SD. Tbno. Xylophone. Glockenspiel. Bells—2 Harps, Celesta—Strings—TB.

Eventyr: Once Upon a Time is a tone poem for orchestra composed by Frederick Delius in 1917. It was given its premiere in London on 11 January 1919, under the direction of Henry Wood.

Eventyr is the Norwegian word for adventure. The score's title is followed by the indication, "After Asbjørnsen's Folklore".

== Composition ==
Delius' first sketches for the work date from 1915. His manuscript classifies the work as a "Ballad for Orchestra". The work was titled Once Upon a Time during most of its composition and was even billed that way for a first performance. The premiere was set for 23 November 1918, but the copyist struggled to make sense of Delius' notation. Some of the manuscript was also lost because the composer had used a lead pencil.

== Structure ==
After a twenty-bar introduction, a fantastic theme is played first by the bassoons and then by the other woodwinds. The second subject is presented by the strings and gains in intensity with the addition of another subject in counterpoint. Several climactic moments follow before the creation of a fairy world, dominated by a descending chromatic theme for strings, celesta, and harp. The piece is concluded with the return of earlier material, followed by a quiet closing section.

== Legacy ==
A reduction for pit orchestra was made by Antal Doráti and performed in a ballet by Antony Tudor called Romeo and Juliet. The work was performed by the Ballet Theatre at the Metropolitan Opera in New York City on 6 April 1943.
