= I Don't Want to Get Well =

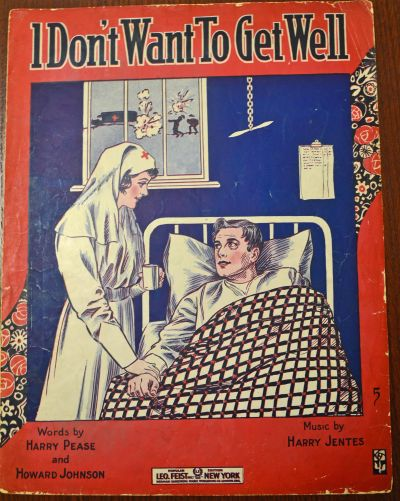
- Sheet music cover

Song
- Released: 1917–1918
- Composer(s): Harold Jentes
- Lyricist(s): Harry Pease, Howard Johnson

"I Don't Want to Get Well" is a World War I era song released sometime between 1917 and 1918. Harry Pease and Howard Johnson wrote the lyrics. Harold Jentes composed the music. Leo Feist, Inc. of New York City published the song. Rosenbaum Studios designed the sheet music cover. It features a Red Cross nurse checking the pulse of a wounded soldier as he lies in his hospital bed. The two look at each other longingly. A battle is seen through the window. It was written for both voice and piano.

Vocalist Arthur Fields and Grace Woods recorded the song in 1918. It was issued by Edison Blue Amberol. Eddie Cantor popularized the song.

The song is about a soldier who does not want to get better because he has fallen in love with his nurse. The soldier sends a letter to his worried friend, assuring him that getting shot was the best thing that happened to him. The friend then decides to head to war and hopes he gets injured too. The two choruses are as follows:

Chorus 1:
I don't want to get well,
I don't want to get well,
I'm in love with a beautiful nurse.
Early ev'ry morning, night, and noon,
The cutest little girlie comes and feeds me with a spoon.
I don't want to get well,
I don't want to get well,
I'm glad they shot me on the fighting line, fine!
The doctor says that I'm in bad condition,
But oh, oh, oh, I've got so much ambition;
I don't want to get well,
I don't want to get well,
For I'm having a wonderful time

Chorus 2:
I don't want to get well,
I don't want to get well,
I'm in love with a beautiful nurse.
Though the doctor's treatments show results,
I always get a bad relapse each time she feels my pulse;
I don't want to get well,
I don't want to get well,
I'm glad they shot me on the fighting line, fine!
She holds my hand and begs me not to leave her,
Then all at once I get so full of fever,
I don't want to get well,
I don't want to get well,
For I'm having a wonderful time.

The sheet music can be found at Pritzker Military Museum & Library.

== See also ==
- Malingering
