= Arthur Chapman (poet) =

American poet (1873–1935)

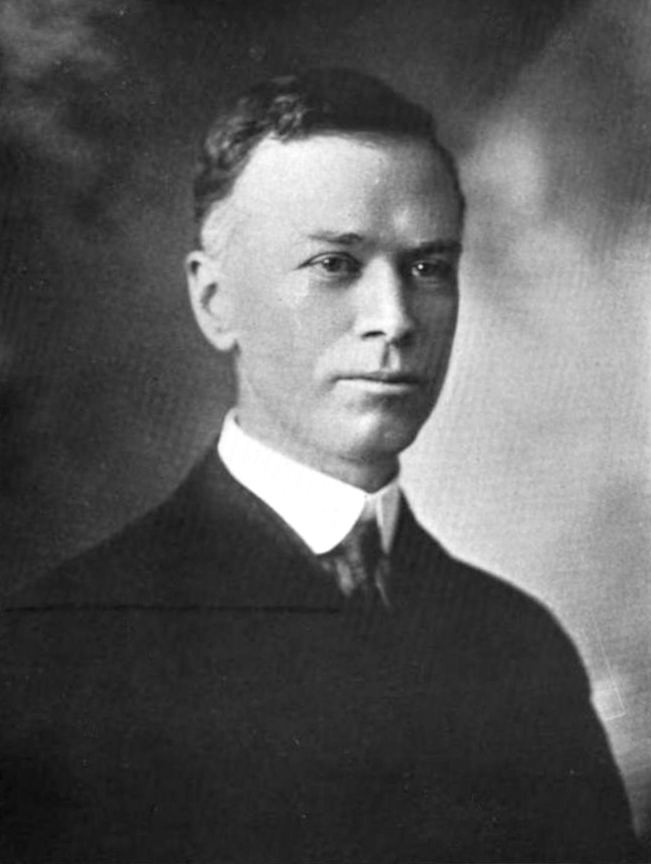
- Chapman in a 1917 publication
- Born: June 25, 1873; Rockford, Illinois
- Died: December 4, 1935 (aged 62); New York, New York
- Occupation: Writer

Arthur Chapman (June 25, 1873 – December 4, 1935) was an early twentieth-century American poet, newspaper columnist and author. He wrote a subgenre of American poetry known as cowboy poetry. His most famous poem was Out Where the West Begins.

== Early life ==
Arthur Chapman was born in Rockford, Illinois on June 25, 1873. He worked at a newspaper there before moving to Chicago.

== Out Where the West Begins ==
In 1910, Chapman wrote his most famous poem, "Out Where the West Begins". Chapman had read an Associated Press report of governors of the Western States debating where the American West actually began geographically. In response, he hastily composed a poem that celebrated the people and the land of the region.

The first of its three seven-line stanzas ran,

Out where the handclasp's a little stronger,
Out where the smile dwells a little longer,
That's where the West begins;
Out where the sun is a little brighter,
Where the snows that fall are a trifle whiter,
Where the bonds of home are a wee bit tighter,
That's where the West begins.

The poem was an immediate sensation, widely quoted, often imitated, and often parodied.

According to the dust jacket of Chapman's 1921 novel, Mystery Ranch, "To-day ["Out Where the West Begins"] is perhaps the best-known bit of verse in America. It hangs framed in the office of the Secretary of the Interior at Washington. It has been quoted in Congress, and printed as campaign material for at least two Governors. . . . [Chapman's poems possess] a rich Western humor such as had not been heard in American poetry since the passing of Bret Harte."

The popularity of "Out Where the West Begins" led Chapman to release it with his other poems in an anthology. In 1916, he published Out Where the West Begins, and Other Small Songs of a Big Country, a fifteen-page volume issued by Carson-Harper in [Denver]. The book was an immediate commercial success; Houghton Mifflin of Boston and New York immediately offered to publish a larger collection. Out Where the West Begins, and Other Western Verses, as it was renamed, appeared in 1917 with fifty-eight poems. The title poem was widely reprinted on postcards and plaques. In 1920, "Out Where the West Begins" was first set to music. The poem later achieved a separate life on the concert stage.

In 1921, Chapman published the equally successful Cactus Center: Poems of an Arizona Town, containing 30 poems. The Literary Review wrote of the verse, "In vigor of style, [it] irresistibly suggests a transplanted Kipling."

== Move East ==
In 1919 Chapman moved to New York City, where he lived on the East Side of Manhattan. He took a job as a staff writer for the New York Tribune, which he held until his retirement in 1925.

Chapman's first novel, Mystery Ranch (1921), combined western adventure with murder mystery. The Literary Review dismissed it as "melodramatic" and provided "little for the seeker of literary values". However, The New York Times credited Chapman, "known heretofore as a poet of the West," with being "a clever technician in a new field". Mystery Ranch achieved a modest commercial success.

After his wife died in 1923, Chapman married Kathleen Caesar, an editor at the Bell Syndicate; they had no children. He wrote fiction and nonfiction throughout his career as a journalist and continued after he retired.

Chapman's second novel, John Crews (1926), another adventure-romance of frontier life, sold better. Described by the New York Herald Tribune as "a lively and continuously readable yarn," John Crews was successful enough to have a reprint edition by another publisher in its first year (March 28, 1926).

In 1924, Chapman published The Story of Colorado, Out Where the West Begins, a nonfiction illustrated history of the State of Colorado. His final book was The Pony Express: The Record of a Romantic Adventure in Business (1932), a history of the Pony Express. Both books were commercial and critical successes.

Arthur Chapman died in New York City on December 4, 1935.

In 2010, both of Chapman's poetry books were republished in new editions.

== Bibliography ==
=== Poetry ===
Collections

- Chapman, Arthur (1916). Out where the West begins, and other small songs of a big country. Denver: Carson-Harper.
- — (1917). Out where the West begins, and other western verses. Boston: Houghton Mifflin.

List of poems

Title	Year	First published	Reprinted/collected
Out where the West begins	1916 or 1917	Chapman, Arthur (1916). Out where the West begins, and other small songs of a big country. Denver: Carson-Harper.	Chapman, Arthur (1917). Out where the West begins, and other western verses. Boston: Houghton Mifflin.

=== Essays and reporting ===
- Chapman, Arthur (June 6, 1925). "Where the blue songs come from". The New Yorker. Vol. 1, no. 16. p. 19.
