= Frank Clifford Harris =

British lyricist

Frank Clifford Harris (1875 – 1949) was a British lyricist. He often worked with composer James W. Tate.

== Works ==
Harris wrote a musical comedy called The Persian Cat which played at the Unique Theatre in Los Angeles in 1908.
