= Spasm band =

A spasm band is a musical group that plays a variety of Dixieland, trad jazz, jug band, or skiffle music.

The term "spasm" applied to any band (often made up of children) who made musical instruments out of objects not usually employed for such. The first spasm bands were formed on the streets of New Orleans in the late eighteen hundreds, with both styles spreading rapidly along the Mississippi and Ohio Rivers to Baton Rouge, Memphis, St. Louis, Minneapolis, Louisville and Cincinnati, with jug bands being essentially spasm bands that incorporated a jug player "to handle the bass parts".

The earliest band to play under the name "spasm band" in New Orleans was formed in 1895, known informally as Stale Bread's Spasm Band and billed as the Razzy Dazzy Spasm Band at semi-professional engagements, such as outside the West End Opera House. They played, amongst other things, a length of gas pipe, a kettle and a fiddle made from a cigar box.

The spasm band style was one ingredient in the development of instrumental New Orleans jazz. Contemporaries report that the style was imitated by adult orchestras such as the Right At 'Em Razz Band, which featured future Original Dixieland Jass Band clarinetist Alcide Nunez.

The term "spasm band" has been revived by jazz groups the Barnstormers Spasm Band, The Original Rabbit Foot Spasm Band, The End Times Spasm Band, and Anthony Joseph and The Spasm Band.

The term was also adopted by early Canadian noise band The Nihilist Spasm Band formed in London, Ontario in 1965.
