= Kelly's Stables =

Kelly's Stables may refer to:

- Kelly's Stables (Chicago), an American jazz venue in Chicago
- Kelly's Stables (New York City), a jazz club on Manhattan's 52nd Street in New York City
