= Jazz (word) =

Etymology of the term "jazz"

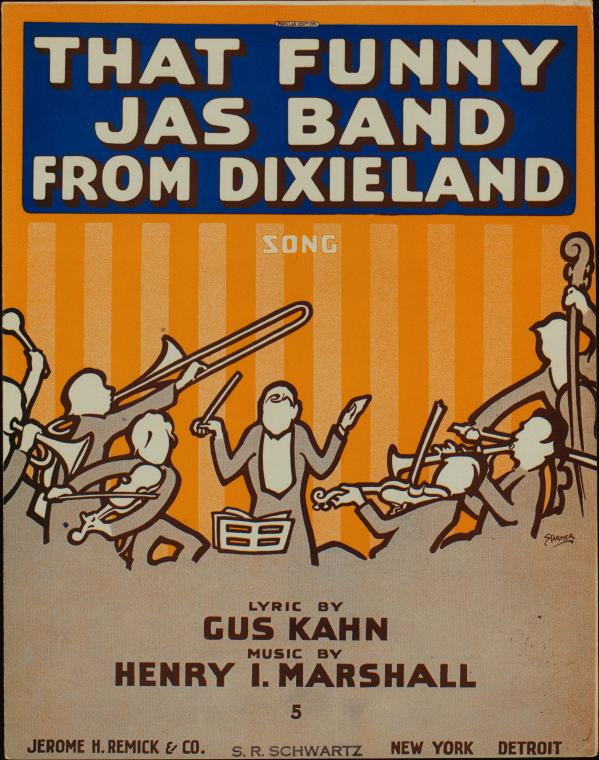
Sheet music cover from 1916; spellings such as "jas", "jass" and "jasz" were seen until 1918.

The origin of the word jazz is one of the most sought-after etymologies in modern American English. Interest in the word – named the Word of the Twentieth Century by the American Dialect Society – has resulted in considerable research and the linguistic history is well documented. "Jazz" originated in slang around 1912 on the West Coast of the United States. The meaning varied, but the word did not initially refer to music. "Jazz" came to mean jazz music in Chicago around 1915.

== Etymology ==
The similarity of "jazz" to "jasm", an obsolete slang term meaning spirit, energy, and vigor, and dated to 1860 in the Random House Historical Dictionary of American Slang (1979), suggests that "jasm" should be considered the leading candidate for the source of "jazz".

According to the Oxford English Dictionary, the word "jasm" first appeared in Josiah Gilbert Holland’s second novel, Miss Gilbert's Career (1860), and meant “lively," and was used to describe the "inexpressible personal force of the Yankee".

A link between the two words is supported by a February 18, 1916 article in the Daily Californian which used the spelling "jaz-m", although the context and other articles in the same newspaper from this period show that "jazz" was intended.

"Jasm" derives from or is a variant of the slang term "jism" or "gism", which the Historical Dictionary of American Slang dates to 1842 and defines as "spirit; energy; spunk." "Jism" also means semen or sperm, the meaning that predominates today, making "jism" a taboo word. Consistent with that etymology, the jazz composer Eubie Blake (1887–1983), when interviewed by a woman for Yale's Oral History of American Music project, refused to use the word "jazz" because he thought it was uncouth. Deepening the nexus among these words is the fact that "spunk" is also a slang term for semen and that "spunk"—like jism/jasm—also means spirit, energy, or courage (for example: "She showed a lot of spunk"). In the 19th and early 20th centuries, however, "jism" was still used in polite contexts. "Jism" or its variant "jizz" (which is not attested in the Historical Dictionary of American Slang until 1941) has also been suggested as a direct source for "jazz". A direct derivation from "jism" is phonologically unlikely. "Jasm" itself would be, according to this assumption, the intermediary form.

Compare the analogous relationship between the slang terms "spasm" 'a sudden burst of energy', as in spasm band, and "spaz(z)". Herbert Asbury names the "Razzy Dazzy Spasm Band", which appeared about 1895, as the first jazz band; he relates that a band of professional musicians who imitated their style and originally appeared, about 1900, under the same name, was, after the original Spasm Band turned up, billed as "Razzy Dazzy Jazzy Band".

One source draws from the 1936 book The French Quarter by Herbert Asbury for the claim that there was a band in New Orleans in 1895 named the "Razzy Dazzy Spasm Band". This source also claims a connection to the French verb jaser, meaning to chatter, and that "to jass" was heard in New Orleans to mean 'to excite' or 'to pep up'.

== Baseball use ==
Baseball references were used by E. T. "Scoop" Gleeson in the San Francisco Bulletin. Dick Holbrook and Peter Tamony found articles written in Boyes Springs, California, where the San Francisco Seals baseball team was in training. In an article from March 3, 1913, "jazz" is synonymous with nonsense. George Clifford McCarl had been called a "busher", as in "bush league", meaning minor league or second rate. But Gleeson writes, on the contrary, "this dope is very much to the 'jazz'." Other uses occurred in "Everybody has come back to the old town full of the old 'jazz' and they promise to knock the fans off their feet with their playing." "What is the 'jazz'? Why, it's a little of that 'old life', the 'gin-i-ker', the 'pep', otherwise known as the enthusiasm". The article says that "members have trained on ragtime and 'jazz' and manager Del Howard says there's no stopping them." The context of the article shows that a musical meaning of "jazz" is not intended; rather, ragtime and "jazz" were both used as markers of ebullient spirit.

On April 5, 1913, the Bulletin published an article by Ernest J. Hopkins entitled "In Praise of 'Jazz,' a Futurist Word Which Has Just Joined the Language." The article, which used the spellings "jaz" and "jazz" interchangeably, discussed the term at length and included a positive definition.

"Jazz" (We change the spelling each time so as not to offend either faction) can be defined, but it cannot be synonymized. If there were another word that exactly expressed the meaning of "jaz," "jazz" would never have been born. A new word, like a new muscle, only comes into being when it has long been needed...This remarkable and satisfactory-sounding word, however, means something like life, vigor, energy, effervescence of spirit, joy, pep, magnetism, verve, virility ebulliency, courage, happiness – oh, what's the use? – Jazz.

In 2003, The Los Angeles Times reported on a librarian at New York University who said he found the word "jazz" used in a sports article from The New York Times of April 2, 1912. Under the headline "Ben's Jazz Curve" the article quotes baseball player Ben Henderson telling a reporter that he called his curve ball "the Jazz ball because it wobbles and you simply can't do anything with it."

"Jazz" in the sense of pep and enthusiasm continued in use in California for several years before being submerged by its musical meaning. Barry Popik found examples from the Daily Californian and the Daily Palo Alto showing that "jazz" was a slang term at the University of California, Berkeley, from 1915 to 1917 and Stanford University from 1916 to 1918.

== Application to music ==
Dick Holbrook published his findings in Storyville magazine. These included William Demarest, an actor, saying he heard the word in 1908 as a young musician in San Francisco when the band was encouraged to play more energetically. Clarinetist Bud Jacobson said the word was used in Chicago to promote the Art Arseth band at the Arsonia Cafe in 1914. Fred R. Shapiro, editor of the Yale Book of Quotations, found it applied to music in the Chicago Daily Tribune of July 11, 1915:

Blues Is Jazz and Jazz Is Blues...The Worm had turned – turned to fox trotting. And the "blues" had done it. The "jazz" had put pep into the legs that had scrambled too long for the 5:15....At the next place a young woman was keeping "Der Wacht Am Rhein" and "Tipperary Mary" apart when the interrogator entered. "What are the blues?" he asked gently. "Jazz!" The young woman's voice rose high to drown the piano....The blues are never written into music, but are interpolated by the piano player or other players. They aren't new. They are just reborn into popularity. They started in the south half a century ago and are the interpolations of darkies originally. The trade name for them is "jazz"....Thereupon "Jazz" Marion sat down and showed the bluest streak of blues ever heard beneath the blue. Or, if you like this better: "Blue" Marion sat down and jazzed the jazziest streak of jazz ever. Saxophone players since the advent of the "jazz blues" have taken to wearing "jazz collars," neat decollate things that give the throat and windpipe full play, so that the notes that issue from the tubes may not suffer for want of blues – those wonderful blues.

Examples in Chicago sources continued with the term reaching other cities by the end of 1916. By 1917 the term was in widespread use. The first known use in New Orleans, discovered by lexicographer Benjamin Zimmer in 2009, appeared in the New Orleans Times-Picayune on November 14, 1916:

Theatrical journals have taken cognizance of the "jas bands" and at first these organizations of syncopation were credited with having originated in Chicago, but any one ever having frequented the "tango belt" of New Orleans knows that the real home of the "jas bands" is right here. However, it remains for the artisans of the stage to give formal recognition to the "jas bands" of New Orleans. The day of the "Stage Workers" annual masquerade ball, which is November 23, the stage employes of the city are going to traverse the city led by a genuine and typical "jas band." Just where and when these bands, until this winter known only to New Orleans, originated, is a disputed question. It is claimed they are the outgrowth of the so-called "fish bands" of the lake front camps, Saturday and Sunday night affairs...However, the fact remains that their popularity has already reached Chicago, and that New York probably will be invaded next. But, be that as it may, the fact remains the only and original are to be found here and here alone. The "boys behind the scenes" have named their parade the "Jas parade." It's going to be an automobile affair with the actors and actresses of the various theaters right behind the band. The ball is to be at the Washington Artillery.

It is not clear who first applied "jazz" to music. A leading contender is Bert Kelly, a musician and bandleader who was familiar with the California slang term from being a banjoist with Art Hickman's orchestra. Kelly formed Bert Kelly's Jazz Band and claimed in a letter published in Variety on October 2, 1957, that he had begun using "the Far West slang word 'jazz,' as a name for an original dance band" in 1914. Kelly's claim is considered plausible but lacks contemporary verification, although Literary Digest wrote on April 26, 1919 "[t]he phrase 'jazz band' was first used by Bert Kelly in Chicago in the fall of 1915, and was unknown in New Orleans."

Trombonist Tom Brown led a New Orleans band in Chicago in 1915 and claimed his group was the first billed as a "jass" band. Slightly later was the Original Dixieland Jass Band or, in some accounts, a predecessor named Stein's Dixie Jass Band, allegedly so named by Chicago cafe manager Harry James. According to a November 1937 article in Song Lyrics, "A dance-crazed couple shouted at the end of a dance, 'Jass it up boy, give us some more jass.' Promoter Harry James immediately grasped this word as the perfect monicker for popularizing the new craze."

If the chronology of the Original Dixieland Jass Band is correct, it did not receive the "jass" name until March 3, 1916, which would be too late for it to be the originator. In a 1917 court case concerning song copyright, members of what became the O.D.J.B. testified under oath that the band played in Chicago under the name Stein's Dixie Jass Band.

In Volume II of its Supplement (1976) and hence in the 1989 Second Edition, the Oxford English Dictionary provided a 1909 citation for the use of "jazz" on a gramophone record of "Uncle Josh in Society." Researcher David Shulman demonstrated in 1989 that this attestation was an error based on a later version of the recording; the 1909 recording does not use the word "jazz". Editors acknowledged the error, and the revised entry of "jazz" in OED Online changed the date of this quotation with a note about the mistake. But many secondary sources continue to show 1909 as the earliest known example of the word based on the OED's original entry.

The Grand Larousse Dictionnaire de la Langue Française and the Über englisches Sprachgut im Französischen cite a 1908 use of jazband, a jazz orchestra, in the Paris newspaper Le Matin. This is a typographical error for 1918.

== Other meanings ==
In an 1831 letter, Lord Palmerston wrote in reference to Charles Maurice de Talleyrand-Périgord, of "old Talley jazzing and telling stories to Lieven and Esterhazy and Wessenberg." Scholars believe that Palmerston was not using "jazz" in any modern sense but was simply anglicizing French jaser in its standard meaning of chattering or chatting. No other examples of Palmerston's usage exists, thus ruling it out as an origin.

== Other etymological proposals ==
In an August 5, 1917 article from the New York Sun, Walter J. Kingsley claimed that "jaz" has an African origin. "In his studies of the Creole patois and idiom in New Orleans Lafcadio Hearn reported that the word ‘jaz’, meaning to speed things up, to make excitement, was common among the blacks of the South, and had been adopted by the Creoles as a term to be applied to music of a rudimentary syncopated type." But recent searches of the works of Lafcadio Hearn failed to find any mention of the word. Lawrence Gushee argues that Kingsley's quote from Hearn is most likely fraudulent.

Geoffrey C. Ward and Ken Burns in Jazz: A History of America's Music (2000) and Hilton Als in the New York Review of Books on March 27, 2003, suggest "jazz" comes from the jasmine perfume that prostitutes wore in the red-light district of New Orleans. This theory derives from the recollections of jazz musician Garvin Bushell as told to Mark Tucker in Jazz from the Beginning (1988). Bushell said that he heard this derivation in the circus where he began working in 1916. It appears to be a false etymology unsupported by evidence. The French brought the perfume industry with them to New Orleans, and the oil of jasmine was a popular ingredient. To add it to a perfume was called "jassing it up." The strong scent was popular in the red-light district where a working girl might approach a prospective customer and say, "Is jazz on your mind tonight, young fellow?"

Ward and Burns also suggested "jazz" derives from "jezebel", a nineteenth-century term for prostitute. S. Frederick Starr states the same use of jezebel, rooted in the Old Testament. In New Orleans, the term was changed to "jazzbelle", with pimps or other males called "jazzbeau".

DuBose Heyward, author of "Porgy", in his book Jasbo Brown and Selected Poems (1924), states jazz may have taken its name from Jazbo Brown.

Kingsley claimed the phrase "jaz her up" was used by plantation slaves and that in common vaudeville usage "jaz her up" or "put in jaz" meant to accelerate or add low comedy, while "jazbo" meant "hokum".

Bandleader Art Hickman said "jazz" was named for the effervescent springs at Boyes Springs. He made the claim in the San Francisco Examiner of October 12, 1919 and San Francisco Chronicle of November 9, 1919.

== Word game value ==
Outside of its etymological history, the word jazz is also notable for reportedly being the hardest word to guess in a game of hangman. This is due to the short length of the word, the fact that it only has one vowel, and the fact that the letters J and Z that make up the remaining three-quarters are two of the least used letters in the Latin alphabet.
