= Tom Brown (trombonist) =

American dixieland jazz trombonist (1888–1958)

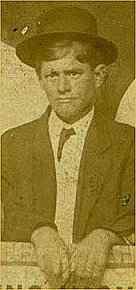

Background information
- Also known as: Red Brown
- Born: June 3, 1888; Uptown, New Orleans, Louisiana, U.S.
- Died: March 25, 1958 (aged 69); New Orleans, Louisiana, U.S.
- Genres: Jazz, Dixieland jazz
- Instruments: Trombone, string bass

Tom P. Brown (June 3, 1888 – March 25, 1958), sometimes known by the nickname Red Brown, was an American dixieland jazz trombonist. He also played string bass professionally.

== Early life ==
Brown was born in the Uptown neighborhood of New Orleans, Louisiana. His younger brother, Steve Brown, also became a prominent professional musician.

== Career ==
Brown played trombone with the bands of Papa Jack Laine and Frank Christian; by 1910 usually worked leading bands under his own name. The band played in a style then locally known as "hot ragtime" or "ratty music". In early 1915, his band was heard by Vaudeville dancer Joe Frisco who then arranged a job for Brown's band in Chicago, Illinois.

On May 15, 1915, 'Tom Brown's Band from Dixieland' opened up at Lamb's Cafe at Clark & Randolph Streets in Chicago, with Ray Lopez, cornet and manager; Tom Brown, trombone and leader; Gussie Mueller clarinet, Arnold Loyacano piano and string bass; and Billy Lambert on drums. In Chicago Gussie Mueller was hired by bandleader Bert Kelly, and his place was taken by young New Orleans clarinetist Larry Shields.

This band seems to be the first to be popularly referred to as playing "Jazz", or, as it was sometimes spelled early on, "Jass."

Tom Brown's Band enjoyed over four months of success in Chicago before moving to New York City, where it played for four months more before returning to New Orleans in February 1916. Upon arriving home Brown immediately started rounding up another band to go back to Chicago with him. The group again included Larry Shields; at the end of October, Brown agreed to switch clarinetists with the Original Dixieland Jass Band bringing Alcide Nunez into his band. Brown, Nunez and New Orleans drummer Ragbaby Stevens then went to work for Bert Kelly, who brought them to New York where they temporarily replaced the Original Dixieland Jass Band at Reisenweber's in 1918. Brown started doing freelance recording work with New York dance and novelty bands, then joined the band of Harry Yerkes. At the start of 1920 he was joined in the Yerkes Band by Alcide Nunez.

Brown also played in vaudeville in the acts of Joe Frisco and Ed Wynn.

In late-1921, he returned to Chicago and joined Ray Miller's Black & White Melody Boys, with whom he made more recordings. During this period, he also co-lead a dance band with his brother Steve.

In the mid-1920s, he returned home to New Orleans where he played with Johnny Bayersdorffer and Norman Brownlee's bands, making a few recordings.

During the Great Depression, Borwn supplemented his income from music by repairing radios. He opened up a music shop and a junk shop on Magazine Street. He played string bass in local swing and dance bands. With the revival of interest in traditional jazz he played in various Dixieland bands in the 1950s, notably that of Johnny Wiggs. A local television station thought it would be a good idea to invite Brown and Nick LaRocca to talk about how jazz first spread north from New Orleans, but the show had scarcely started before the two old men got into an argument that turned into a fist-fight.

== Personal life ==
Brown made his last recording just weeks before his death. He died in New Orleans.
