= The Spasm Band =

Anthony Joseph & The Spasm Band
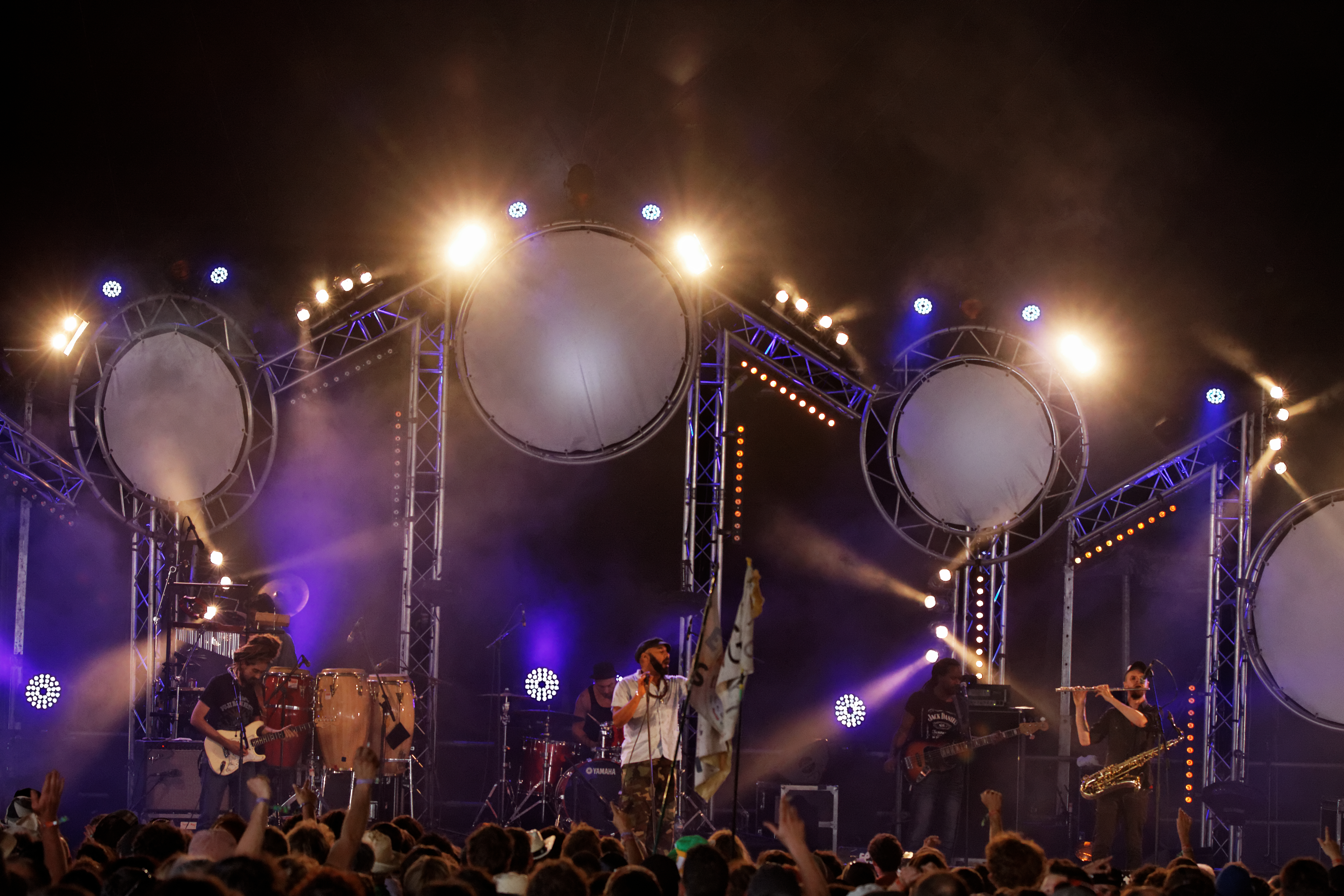
- Anthony Joseph & The Spasm Band in August 2012.

Background information
- Origin: London, UK
- Genres: Jazz; Funk; Rock; Caribbean
- Years active: 2005–2014
- Labels: Heavenly Sweetness; Naïve
- Members: Anthony Joseph - Vocals & Percussion; Andrew John - Bass; Colin Webster - Saxophone & Flute; Marijus Alexsa - Drums; Christian Arcucci - Guitar
- Website: www.myspace.com/adjoseph www.anthonyjoseph.co.uk

Anthony Joseph & The Spasm Band were a band led by Trinidadian poet, novelist and lecturer Anthony Joseph. The band was formed in London in 2005 as an offshoot of his then novel-in-progress The African Origins of UFOs. The band's musical influences include Free Jazz, Afro-Caribbean funk, spoken word, soca, rapso, Calypso, Rock and the hypnotic Spiritual Baptist rhythms that were prominent in Joseph's childhood in Trinidad. In December 2005, as a quartet, they recorded their first album 'The Spasm Band' in London. The album was self produced and received only limited exposure. It was heard via Myspace by Parisian producer and Jazz aficionado Antoine Rajon who signed Joseph to his Heavenly Sweetness label and released the Spasm Band's debut 12" EP Spirit Lash, which featured songs from their initial recordings.

== Leggo de Lion ==
Their debut album Leggo de Lion was released in April 2007 by Kindred Spirits and the Spasm Band toured Europe and the UK during 2007 in support of the album, appearing at the North Sea Jazz Festival, Rotterdam, Les Eurockeennes, Belfort, Roskilde, Denmark and the Blue Note Jazz Festival in Paris. They also performed at the Jazz au Chellah Festival in Rabat, Morocco.

== Bird Head Son ==
In March 2008 they recorded their second album Bird Head Son in just two days in Meudon, France, produced by Antoine Rajon. During the sessions, 20 songs were recorded live in the studio with no overdubs. The album features the now expanded Spasm Band line up as well as guest performers Keziah Jones, Defunkt founder Joseph Bowie, David Neerman and Jamika Ajalon. A 3 track EP La Diablese was released by Heavenly Sweetness in July 2008. It included the tracks "Vero", "Robberman" (both included on the Bird Head Son album) and an exclusive version of Poverty is Hell by the Mighty Shadow.

The Bird Head Son Tour commenced in December 2008 at Rennes, France and continued throughout 2009.

The album was released in January 2009 by Naive/Heavenly Sweetness. As with Joseph's last album, Leggo de Lion this album is also accompanied by a new literary work; Joseph's 3rd collection of poetry, also entitled Bird Head Son which was published by Salt Publishing in February 2009 to coincide with the UK release of the album. It includes lyrics from the album.

== Rubber Orchestras ==
The band's third album Rubber Orchestras was released in October 2011. It featured production from Malcolm Catto and Jerry Dammers and was named Jazz/World album of 2011 by Les Inrocks magazine, album of the year by Vibrations Magazine. A single and video 'She is the sea' was also released from the album in late October 2011.

== Albums ==
- Anthony Joseph & The Spasm Band - Poison Engine Press, 2006
- Leggo de Lion - Kindred Spirits, 2007
- Bird Head Son - Naive/Heavenly Sweetness, 2009
- Rubber Orchestras - Naive/Heavenly Sweetness, 2011

== EPs & Singles ==
- "The Bamboo Saxophone (Kidkanevil Remix)" - Heavenly Sweetness, 2009
- "La Diablesse" - Heavenly Sweetness, 2008
- "Spirit Lash" - Heavenly Sweetness, 2006
- "She is the sea" - Heavenly Sweetness, 2011
