= Chicago Water Tower =

- Chicago Avenue Water Tower and Pumping Station
- U.S. Historic district – Contributing property
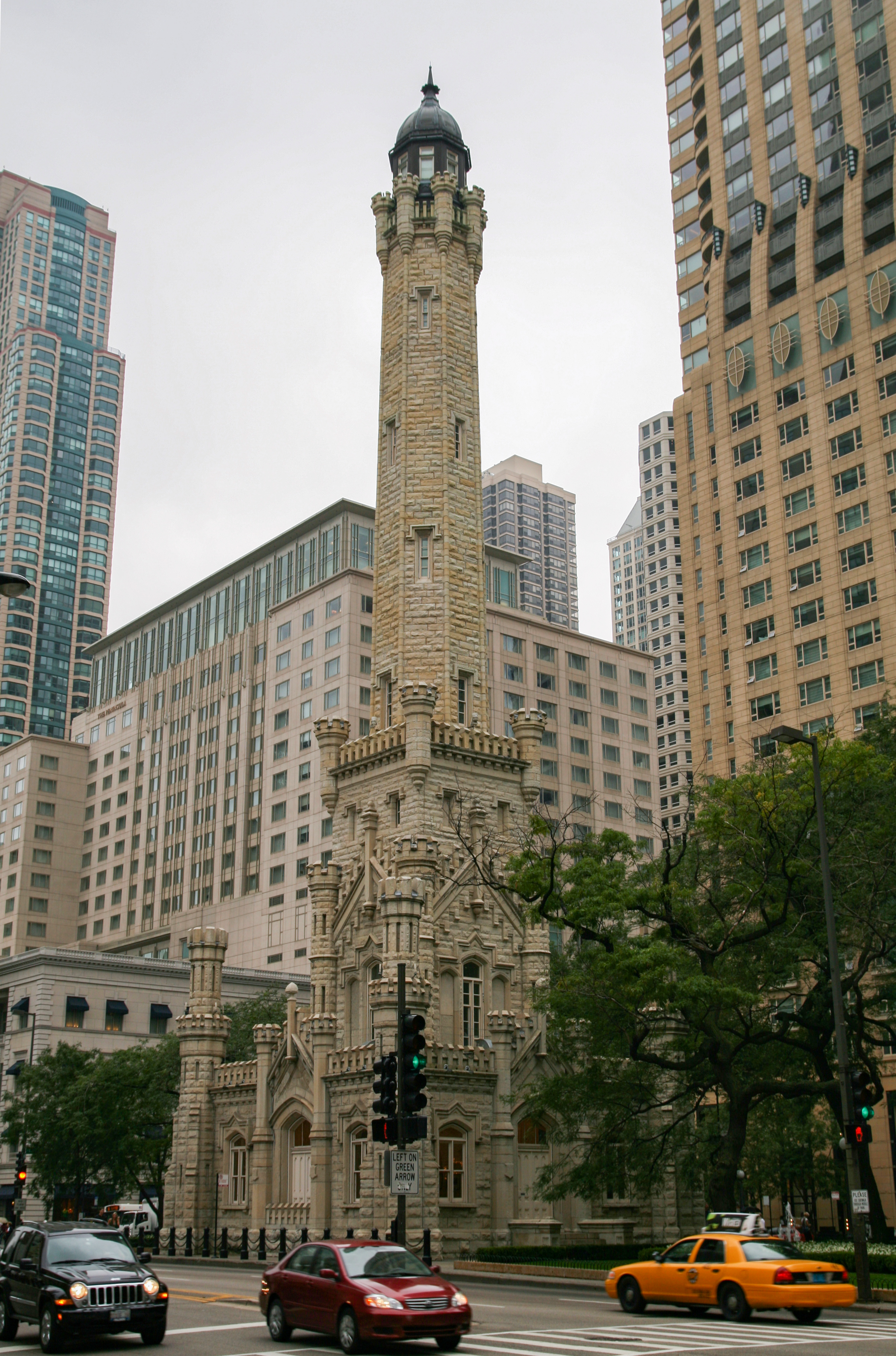
- The Chicago Water Tower

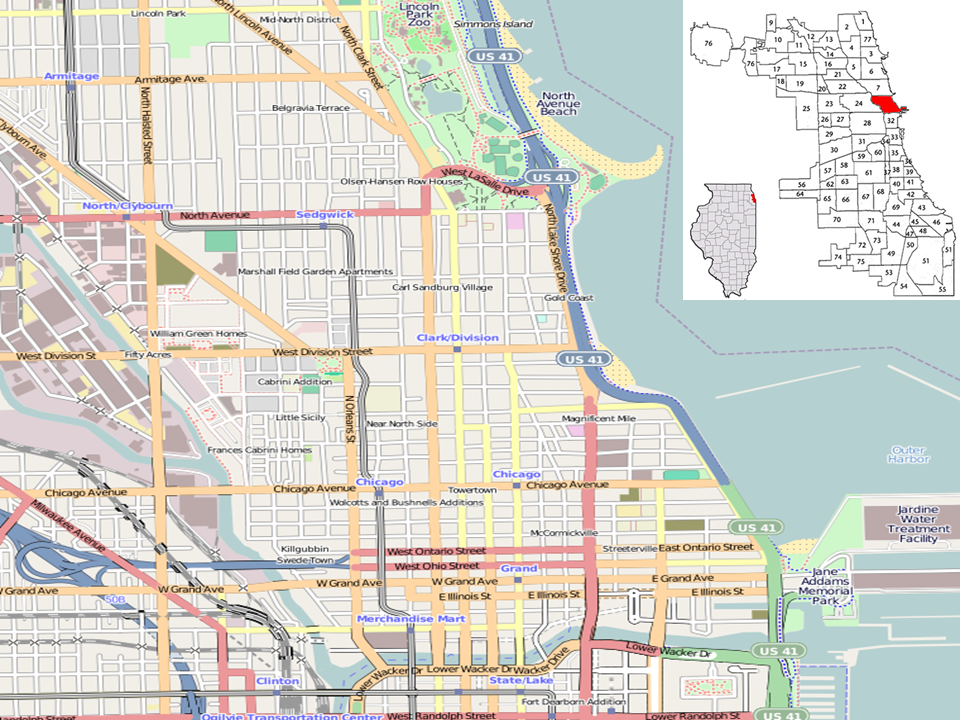
- Location within Near North Side, Chicago
- Location: 806 North Michigan Avenue; Chicago, Illinois; United States
- Coordinates: 41°53′49.82″N 87°37′27.92″W
- Built: 1869; 157 years ago
- Part of: Chicago Avenue Water Tower and Pumping Station (ID75000644)
- Designated CP: April 23, 1975

The Chicago Water Tower is a 182.5-foot (56 m) tall former water tower in Chicago, Illinois. Inside was a 138-foot (42 m) high standpipe, which housed a large water pump. In addition to being used for firefighting, the pressure in the pipe could be regulated to control water surges in the area.

The tower became particularly well known when it survived the Great Chicago Fire of 1871 while adjacent buildings burned to the ground. Located at 806 Michigan Avenue, it is the centerpiece of a small park, the Jane M. Byrne Plaza. It lies along the Magnificent Mile shopping district in the city's Near North Side community area, and serves as an art gallery for the Chicago Office of Tourism.

The tower is a contributing property and landmark in the Old Chicago Water Tower District, and is listed on the National Register of Historic Places. The large urban, mixed-use development Water Tower Place was named after it.

== History ==
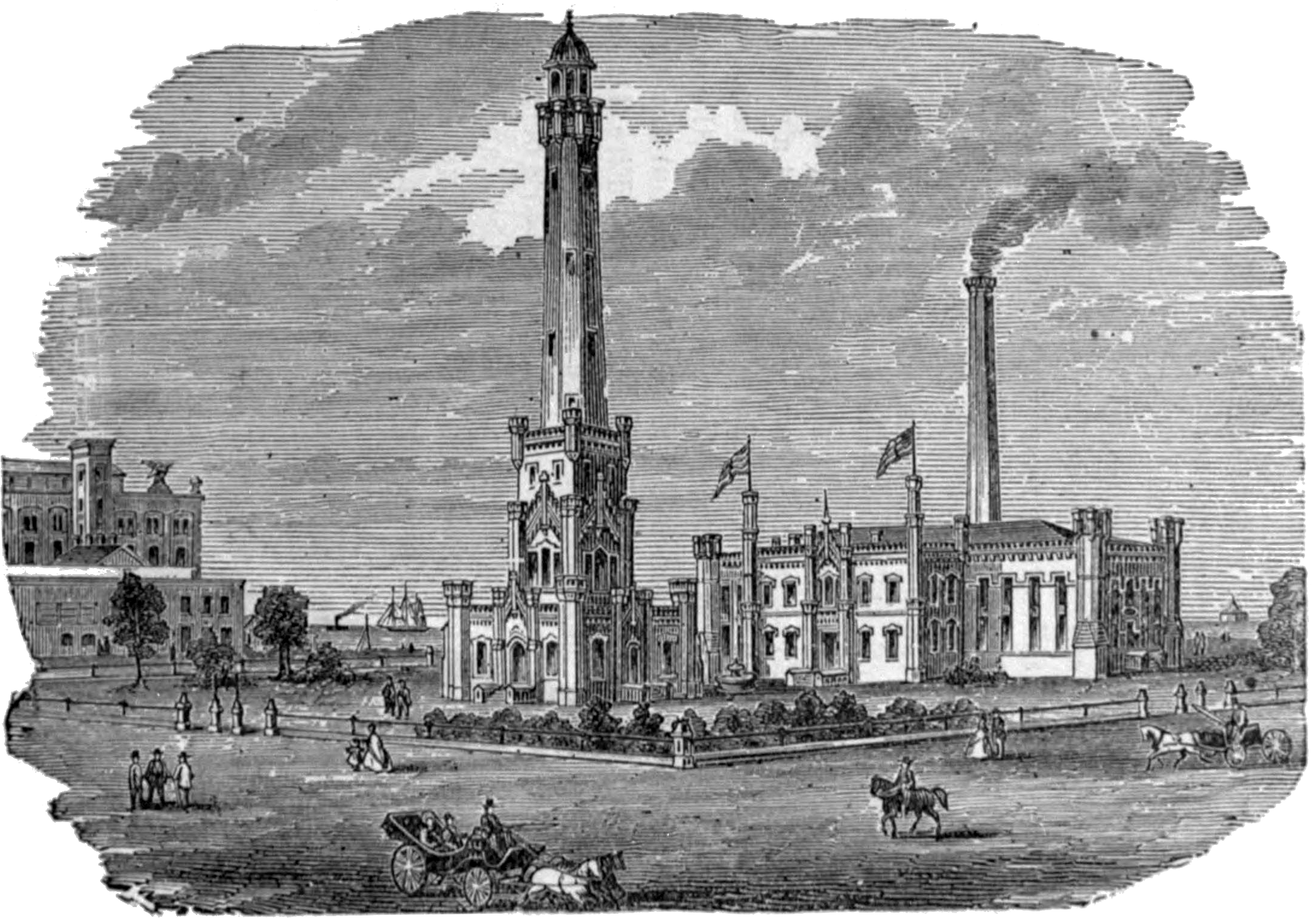
Chicago Water Tower and Chicago Avenue Pumping Station, circa 1886

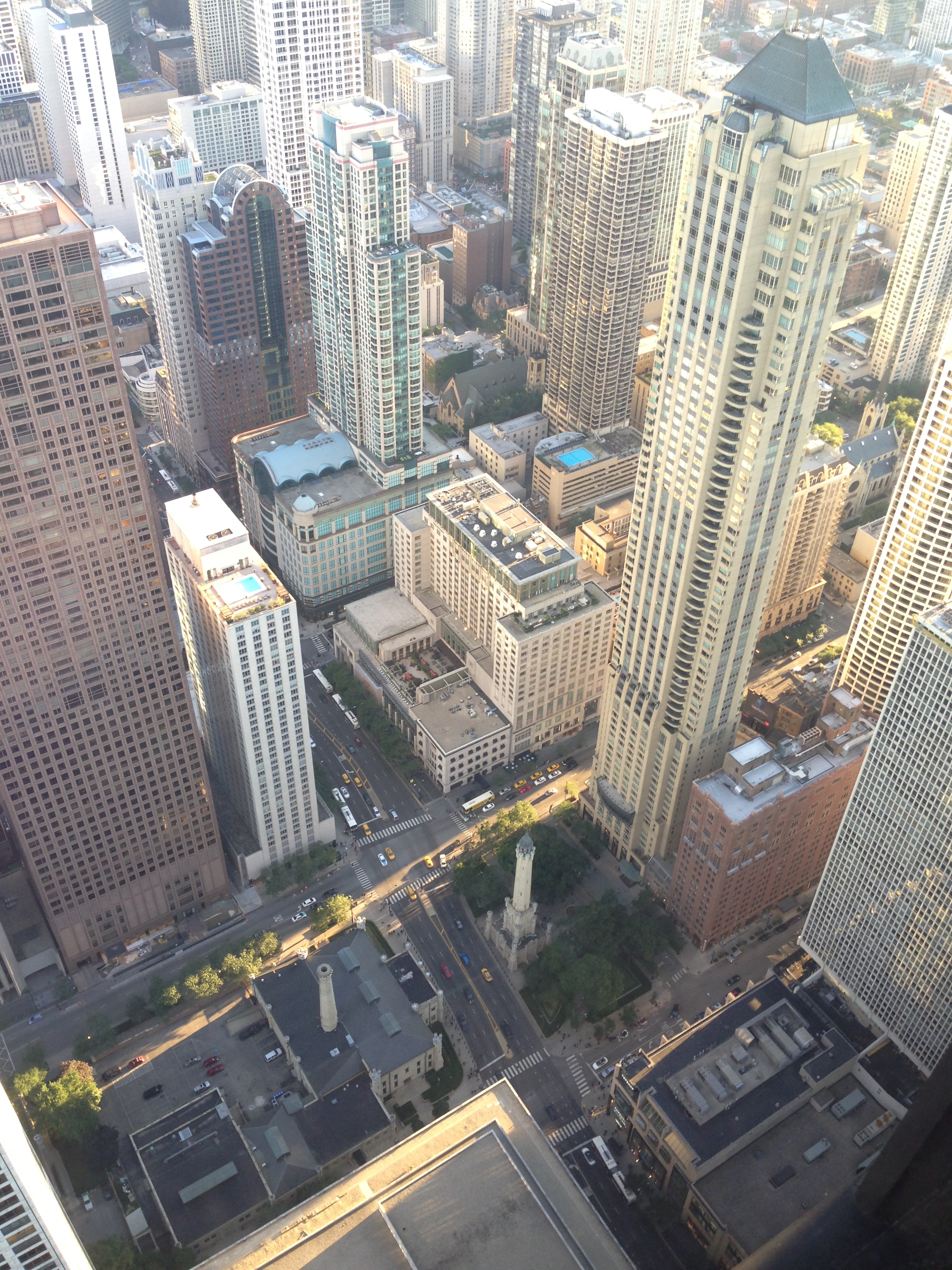
The tower in comparison to other high rises in the area, September 2013

The tower was designed in 1869 by architect William W. Boyington, who also built the Soldiers' Home, Chicago's last surviving building with a direct association to the Civil War. Together with the adjacent Chicago Avenue Pumping Station, it drew water from water cribs in Lake Michigan.

Constructed from yellowing Lemont limestone, it is the second-oldest water tower in the United States, after the Louisville Water Tower in Louisville, Kentucky.

The tower gained prominence after the Great Chicago Fire of 1871 as the only public building in the burned zone to survive, and remains one of the few surviving structures still standing.

Ironically, the pumping station stopped working during the fire. The roof, not made of limestone, caught fire and the pumps stopped working, stopped supplying water to fight the fire.

After the fire, the water tower temporarily stored books donated by Queen Victoria and others to replace the burnt up ones.

In the years since the fire, the tower has become a symbol of old Chicago and of the city's recovery from the fire. In 1918, when Pine Street was widened, the plans were altered in order to give the Water Tower a featured location in the city.

The tower has undergone two renovations. The first took place during a three-year period, 1913–1916. At that time many of the limestone blocks were replaced. The second renovation occurred in 1978. This renovation consisted mostly of interior changes with only minor changes made to the exterior of the building. In 2014, the small park the tower is sited in was named for former Chicago mayor Jane Byrne. The tower hosts a small art gallery known as the City Gallery in the Historic Water Tower, which features the work of local photographers, artists and filmmakers.

The structure has not been universally admired. Oscar Wilde said it looked like "a castellated monstrosity with pepper boxes stuck all over it," although he did admire the arrangement and movement of the pumping machinery inside. The Water Tower's octagonal buttresses, crenelated towers, and parapet wall inspired the design of some White Castle restaurant buildings. The Tower was named an American Water Landmark in 1969. In 2004 and 2017, the tower was featured in the finales of The Amazing Race 6 and The Amazing Race 29 respectively.

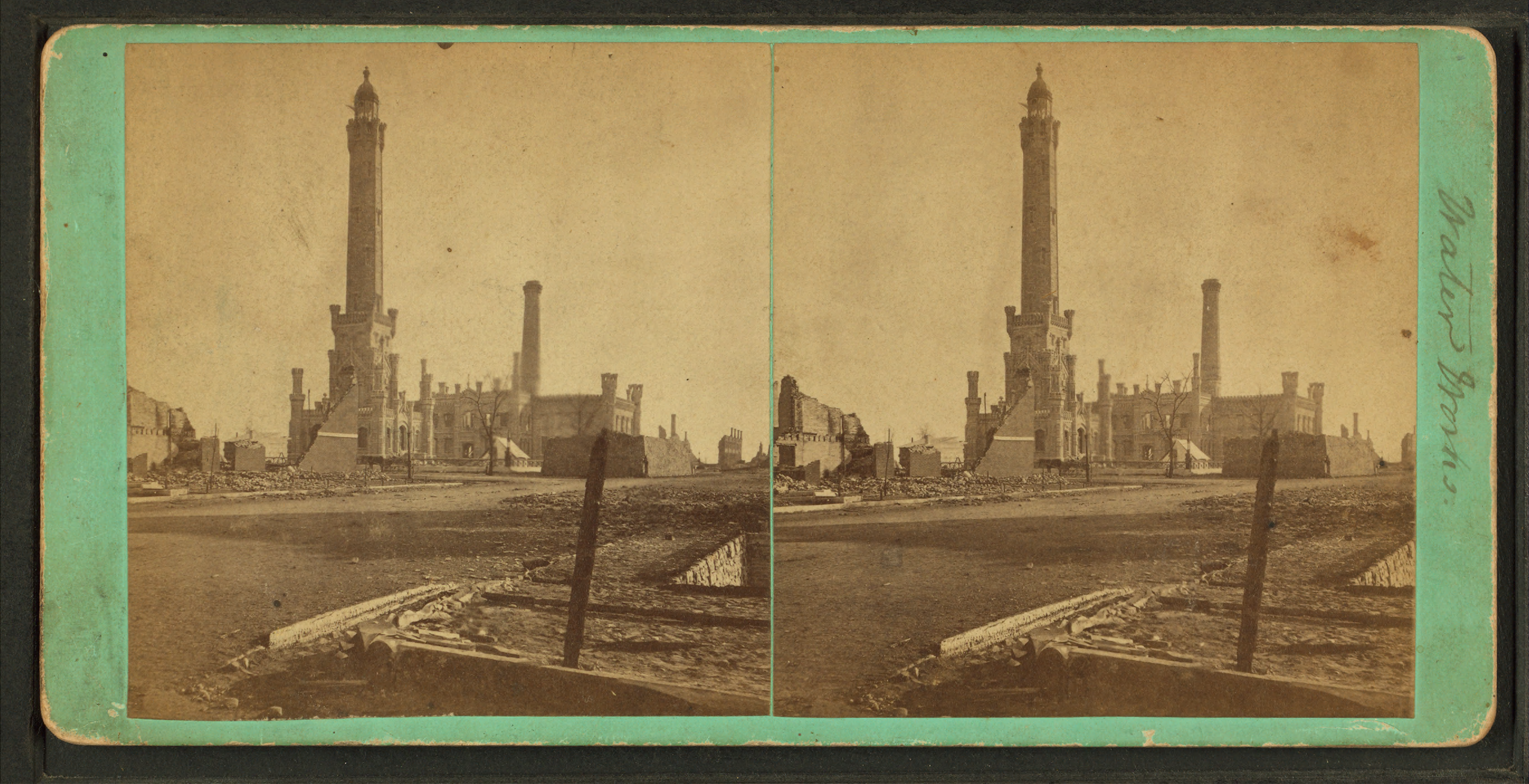
Water Tower after the Chicago Fire

== See also ==
- Architecture of Chicago
- National Register of Historic Places listings in Central Chicago
- Water Tower Place
