= Caribbean Roots =

Studio album by Anthony Joseph
- Released: June 24, 2016
- Recorded: Paris, France, Port of Spain, Trinidad, Ontario, Canada, 2016
- Genre: Jazz, Funk, Spoken Word, Afrobeat, Calypso, World
- Length: 84.00
- Label: Heavenly Sweetness/Strut
- Producer: Anthony Joseph

Anthony Joseph chronology
Time (2014)	Caribbean Roots (2016)

Caribbean Roots is the sixth album overall, and second solo album by Trinidadian poet Anthony Joseph.

== Track listing ==
1. "The Kora"
2. "Jimmy, upon that bridge"
3. "Neckbone"
4. "Mano a Mano"
5. "Brother Davis (Yanvalou)"
6. "Drum Song"
7. "Our History"
8. "Slinger"
9. "Powerful Peace"
10. "Caribbean Roots"

== Personnel ==
- Anthony Joseph - Vocals, Poetry,
- Andrew John - Bass
- Roger Raspail - Percussion
- Jason Yarde - Alto, Soprano and Baritone Saxophones
- Shabaka Hutchings - Saxophones, Clarinet
- Andy Narrell - Steelpans
- Courtney Jones - Steelpans
- Eddie Hick - Drums
- Patrick Marie Magdalene - Guitar
- Pierre Chabrele - Trombone
- Yvon Gulliard - Trumpet
- Florian Pellisier - Keyboards
- Sly Johnson - Vocals*
- David Rudder - Vocals**
- Earl Lovelace - Vocals***
- Mike Clinton - Bass****
