= Emile Christian =

American jazz trombonist (1895–1973)

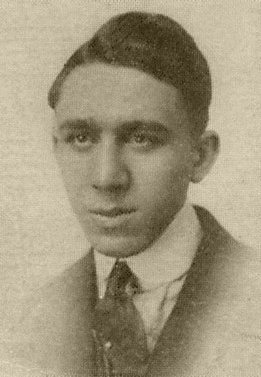
- Christian in 1918

Background information
- Also known as: Emil Christian
- Born: Emile Joseph Christian; April 20, 1895; New Orleans, Louisiana, U.S.
- Died: December 3, 1973 (aged 78) New Orleans, Louisiana, U.S.
- Genre: Jazz
- Occupations: Musician, composer
- Instruments: Trombone, cornet, string bass

Emile Joseph Christian (April 20, 1895 – December 3, 1973), sometimes spelled Emil Christian, was an American early jazz trombonist; he also played cornet and string bass. He also wrote a number of tunes, including "Meet Me at the Green Goose", "Satanic Blues", and "Mardi Gras Parade".

== Biography ==
Christian was born into a musical family in the Bywater neighborhood of New Orleans, most prominently his older brother Frank Christian was a noted cornetist and bandleader. Emile Christian played both cornet and trombone with the Papa Jack Laine bands. He went to Chicago, Illinois in late 1917 to play trombone with the Bert Kelly Jass Band. In 1918 he went to New York City to replace Eddie Edwards in the Original Dixieland Jass Band (ODJB); he toured England with the ODJB, contributed his tune "Satanic Blues" to their repertory, and made his first recordings with this band. After a brief time in the Original Memphis Five, he returned to Europe. There, from 1924 into the 1930s, he played bass and trombone with various jazz bands including those of Eric Borchard and Lud Gluskin, in European cities including Berlin (where he made more recordings), Paris, Stockholm (where he recorded with Leon Abbey's band). In Paris (also in Nice and Aix-les-Bains) he played with Tom Waltham's Ad-Libs. In 1935 he played with Benny Peyton's Jazz Kings in Switzerland.

Christian played in both Black and White bands in Europe and India before returning to the United States after the outbreak of World War II. In the 1950s he moved back to New Orleans, where he played with the bands of Leon Prima, Santo Pecora, and Sharkey Bonano and his own band. In 1957 he toured with the Louis Prima Band. He continued playing in New Orleans into 1969, in his later years mostly playing string bass.

He died in 1973 in New Orleans, aged 78.

== Discography ==
- Emile Christian and His New Orleans Jazz Band, 1958 (Southland)
