= Frank Christian (trumpeter) =

American early jazz trumpeter (1887–1973)

Frank Joseph Christian (September 3, 1887 – November 27, 1973) was an American early jazz trumpeter.

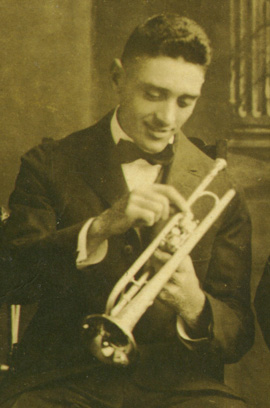
Frank Joseph Christian

== Career ==
Frank Joseph Christian was born in the Bywater neighborhood of downtown New Orleans, Louisiana. In an interview for Tulane's Jazz Archives, he described his family ancestry as "cayudle", a Creole French term for a mutt or mongrel. His brothers Charles (1886–1964) and Emile Christian also worked as professional musicians. Frank showed musical versatility at a young age, and was playing trumpet, clarinet, violin, and tuba professionally by his teens.

He started working with bandleader Papa Jack Laine about 1908 and became a mainstay in Laine's bands. He also worked in the bands of Tom Brown, Johnny Fischer, and led his own band.

In 1916 Frank Christian was the first choice of Alcide Nunez, Eddie Edwards, and Johnny Stein to play in a band they had been hired to bring north to Chicago. Christian initially agreed and rehearsed with the band before it left for the north, but then backed down as he had a full schedular of job offers in New Orleans and thought this less risky than leaving town. Christian was replaced by Nick LaRocca, and thus Frank Christian missed his chance to be in the Original Dixieland Jass Band which made the first jazz recordings in 1917.

After hearing of the commercial success of the O.D.J.B. and other New Orleans musicians who went north, Christian went to play in Chicago with Fischer and Anton Lada. He then went to New York City in response to an offer to start a New Orleans style band to play at a Manhattan dance club called The Alamo. When Christian arrived in New York, Nick LaRocca of the Original Dixieland Jass Band was concerned about competition and offered Christian $200 and a return railway ticket to go back to New Orleans; Christian turned the offer down. He formed the Original New Orleans Jazz Band with whom he recorded on cornet in 1918 and 1919. He was originally the leader of the band, but later it was agreed to turn leadership over to the band's extroverted pianist, Jimmie Durante.

After Durante broke up his band Frank Christian toured Vaudeville with Gilda Gray and played in various theater and dance bands through the 1920s.

== Death ==
He returned home to work his later years in New Orleans, where he died in 1973.
