= Bird Head Son =

Studio album by Anthony Joseph & The Spasm Band
- Released: 20 January 2009
- Recorded: Meudon, France, March 2008
- Genre: Jazz, funk, spoken word, afrobeat
- Length: 79.00
- Label: Naïve/Heavenly Sweetness
- Producer: Antoine Rajon

Anthony Joseph & The Spasm Band chronology
Leggo de Lion (2007)	Bird Head Son (2009)	Rubber Orchestras (2011)

Professional ratings
Review scores
Source	Rating
Fly Global Music	
Shook Magazine	
Mondomix	

Bird Head Son is a 2009 album by poet Anthony Joseph & The Spasm Band. It was recorded in just two days in March 2008 in Meudon, France, and produced by Antoine Rajon. It is the band's sophomore studio album following 2007's Leggo de Lion. During the sessions, 20 songs were recorded live in the studio with no overdubs. The album features an expanded Spasm Band line up, a septet instead of the quartet that recorded the previous album, as well as guest performers Keziah Jones, Defunkt founder Joseph Bowie, David Neerman and Jamika Ajalon. A three-track EP, La Diablese, was released by Heavenly Sweetness in July 2008. It included the tracks "Vero", "Robberman" (both included on the Bird Head Son album) and a version of the Mighty Shadow's "Poverty is Hell". The album was released in January 2009 by Naive/Heavenly Sweetness. Joseph's third collection of poetry, also entitled Bird Head Son, was published by Salt Publishing on 7 February 2009 to coincide with the UK release of the album, and features all the lyrics from the album.

== Track listing ==
All songs written by Anthony Joseph & The Spasm Band

1. "Vero" 6:14
2. "Blues For Cousin Alvin" 4:55
3. "The Bamboo Saxophone" 3:29
4. "Jungle" 12:04
5. "Bird Head Son" 8:40
6. "Cutlass" 6:21
7. "His Hands" 5:19
8. "Two Inch Limbo" 6:21
9. "Conductors of His Mystery" 7:31
10. "River of Masks" 4:51
11. "Robberman" 3:28
12. "Dream on Corbeau Mountain" 3:46

== Personnel ==
- Anthony Joseph - Vocals, Poetry, Percussion, whistle
- Andrew John - Bass
- Paul Zimmerman - Percussion
- Paul Brett - Percussion
- Craig 'Cigar' Tamlin - Percussion
- Colin Webster - Saxophone & Flute

== Guest performers ==
- Jamika Ajalon - Backing vocals, Percussion
- Keziah Jones - Guitar, backing vocals
- Joseph Bowie - Trombone
- David Neerman - Vibraphone
- Adrian Owusu - Guitar
