= Original New Orleans Jazz Band =

US musical group

- Origin: New Orleans, Louisiana, United States
- Genres: Jazz
- Past members: Frank Christian; Alfred Laine; Harry Gluck; Frank Lhotak; Jeff Loyacano; Achille Baquet; Jimmy Durante; Johnny Stein; Deacon Loyacano

The Original New Orleans Jazz Band was one of the first jazz bands to make recordings. Composed of mostly New Orleans musicians, the band was popular in New York City in the late 1910s.

The group included some of the first New Orleans style players to follow the Original Dixieland Jass Band's success playing in Manhattan. Like the "ODJB", most were veterans of Papa Jack Laine's groups in New Orleans. Recordings of the group were issued by Gennett Records and Okeh Records. The group also reportedly recorded one or more sides for Emerson Records, which seem to have never been issued.

Jimmy Durante, the only New Yorker in the group, became well known for his showmanship and took over leadership from Frank Christian in 1920 and the group was renamed "Jimmy Durante's Jazz Band".

== Collective personnel ==
The band was usually a five-piece group, but some musicians came and went. The precise personnel on some of the recordings is uncertain. Members of the band included:

- Frank Christian, cornet
- Alfred Laine, cornet
- Harry Gluck, cornet
- Frank Lhotak, trombone
- Jeff Loyacano, trombone
- Achille Baquet, clarinet
- Jimmy Durante, piano
- Johnny Stein, drums
- Deacon Loyacano, drums
