= Bert Kelly (jazz musician) =

Pioneering band-leader (1882-1968)

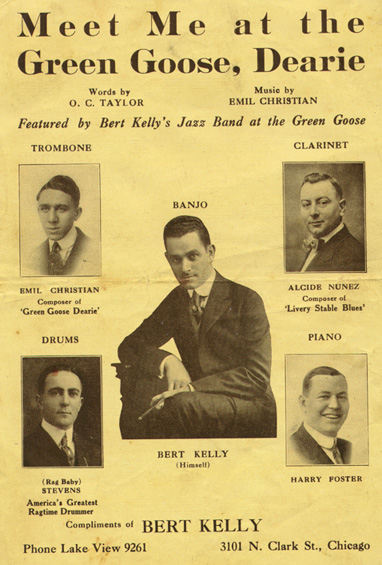
- Bert Kelly and the members of his jazz band in 1918

Background information
- Born: June 2, 1882; Cedar Rapids, Iowa, U.S.
- Died: January 1968 (aged 85–86) Long Beach, New York, U.S.
- Genres: Jazz
- Occupations: Musician, bandleader
- Instrument: Banjo

Bert Kelly (June 2, 1882 in Cedar Rapids, Iowa – January 1968 in Long Beach, New York) was an American musician, who pioneered jazz as a banjoist, bandleader, educator, promoter, night club owner, and night club operator. After professional stints in Seattle and San Francisco, Kelly moved to Chicago in 1914 where he flourished a banjoist, bandleader, and promoter. In 1915 — before the U.S. prohibition — he founded and operated a Chicago speakeasy called "Bert Kelly's Stables," where patrons were introduced to early jazz.

== Kelly as a musician ==
=== Kelly's band ===
Early gigs

Kelly's first professional engagement was in Seattle Washington, around 1896. He moved to San Francisco around 1899.

San Francisco

In 1914, Kelly was in Art Hickman's band playing tea dances in the Rose Room of the St. Francis Hotel in San Francisco. Kelly eventually formed his own band and moved it to Chicago in 1914.

Chicago

Kelly's band in Chicago included notable early New Orleans jazz musicians, including Alcide Nunez, Tom Brown, Gussie Mueller, Emile Christian, and Ragbaby Stephens.

=== Early use of the word "jazz" ===
Kelly claimed that his band, Bert Kelly's Jazz Band, was the first to publish the word "jazz" in 1915.

- In 1914, use of the word "jass" (forerunner to the word "jazz") was forbidden in mixed company in Chicago. Just before winning the Chicago mayoral election in late 1914, Bill Thompson's first police chief ordered Bert Kelly's Stables — the first "joint" on Rush Street — to take down a painted banner advertising "Jass Music." And, public opinion approved.
- In the fall of 1915, Kelly's band had been performing at the College Inn in Chicago. Kelly was directing and playing drums, Wheeler Wadsworth (né Frank Wheeler Wadsworth; 1889–1929) was on saxophone; William Ahearn was on piano, and Sam Baum was on drums. Paraphrasing a 1919 newsprint article by a journalist who chronicled jazz, Walter J. Kingsley (1876–1929), the band played blues, hesitations, and quaint syncopated melodies, and were quite the craze in the night life of Chicago. Thomas Meighan, a movie star, gave a party one night and hired the Kelly band for dance music. The guests included Emmy Wehlen, Julian Eltinge, Jeanne Eagels, and Grace George. Richard Travers filmed it. In a segment showing the musicians, he inserted the caption, "The Originators of Jazz." Thereafter, Kelly's band was known as a "jazz band."
- In a 1973 article, Dick Holbrook, a researcher, refuted Kelly's claim and challenged Kingsley's published account.

== Kelly as a jazz club entrepreneur ==
=== Chicago ===
In the early 1920s — during U.S. prohibition — he founded and operated a Chicago speakeasy called "Bert Kelly's Stables," located at 431 Rush Street, in Chicago's Tower Town. It rapidly gained regional and national popularity as one of the jazz hotspots of the 1920s.

The first house band featured Alcide Nunez, whose featured number "Livery Stable Blues" inspired the name of the venue. Later artists at Kelly's Stables included Freddie Keppard. The brothers Johnny Dodds and Baby Dodds were featured in the house band after their break from King Oliver's band.

=== New York ===
Kelly later opened another jazz club, Kelly's Stables, in New York City, which was prominent on the 52nd Street jazz scene in the 1930s and 1940s.
