= Chicago Avenue Pumping Station =

Facility in Chicago, Illinois

Coordinates: 41°53′50″N 87°37′26″W

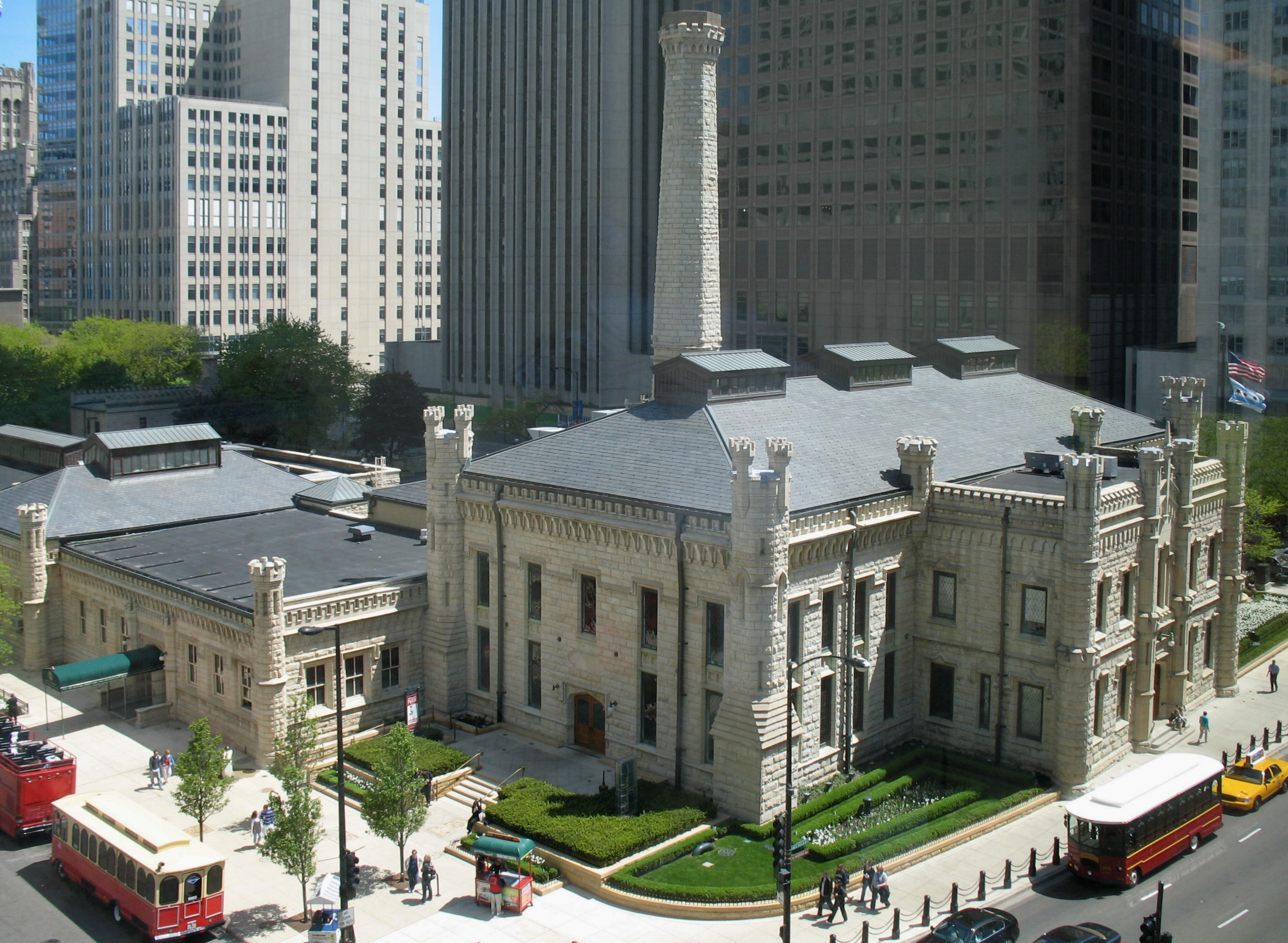
- Chicago Avenue Pumping Station
- Interactive map of Chicago Avenue Pumping Station
- Address: 821 North Michigan Avenue; Chicago, Illinois; United States
- Owner: City of Chicago
- Capacity: 250

Construction
- Reopened: 2003

Tenant
- Lookingglass Theatre Company

Website
- lookingglasstheatre.org
- Chicago Avenue Water Tower and Pumping Station
- U.S. Historic district – Contributing property
- Built: 1869
- Part of: Chicago Avenue Water Tower and Pumping Station (ID75000644)
- Designated CP: April 23, 1975

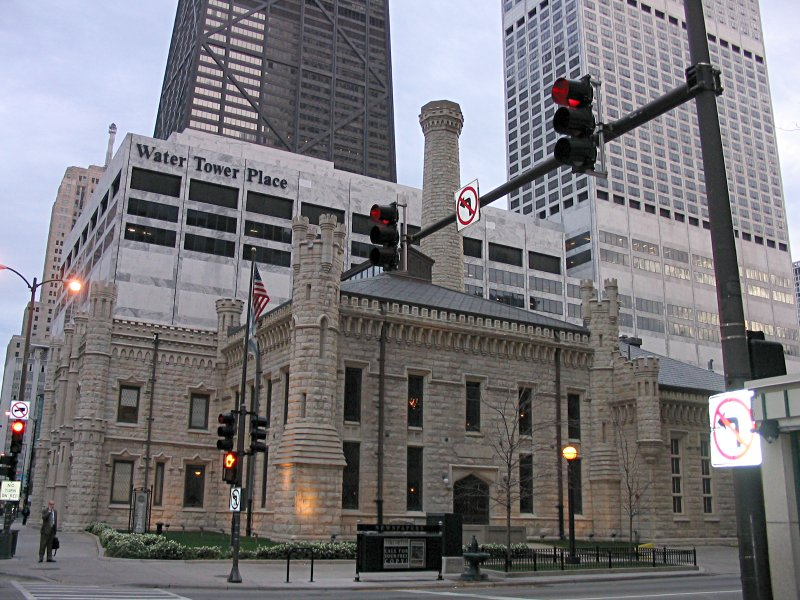
The Station sits across Michigan Avenue opposite the Chicago Water Tower

The Chicago Avenue Pumping Station is a municipal pumping station which provides the city of Chicago, Illinois, with fresh water from Lake Michigan. Built in 1869 by architect William W. Boyington, it stands on the east side of Michigan Avenue opposite the Chicago Water Tower.

In 1918, when Pine Street was widened, the plans were altered in order to give the water tower and pumping station a featured location.

The structure underwent a renovation in 2003 and 2004, repurposing part of it as a theatre. The station is a historic district contributing property in the Old Chicago Water Tower District landmark district, and lies along the Magnificent Mile shopping district in the Near North Side community area.

== Renovation ==
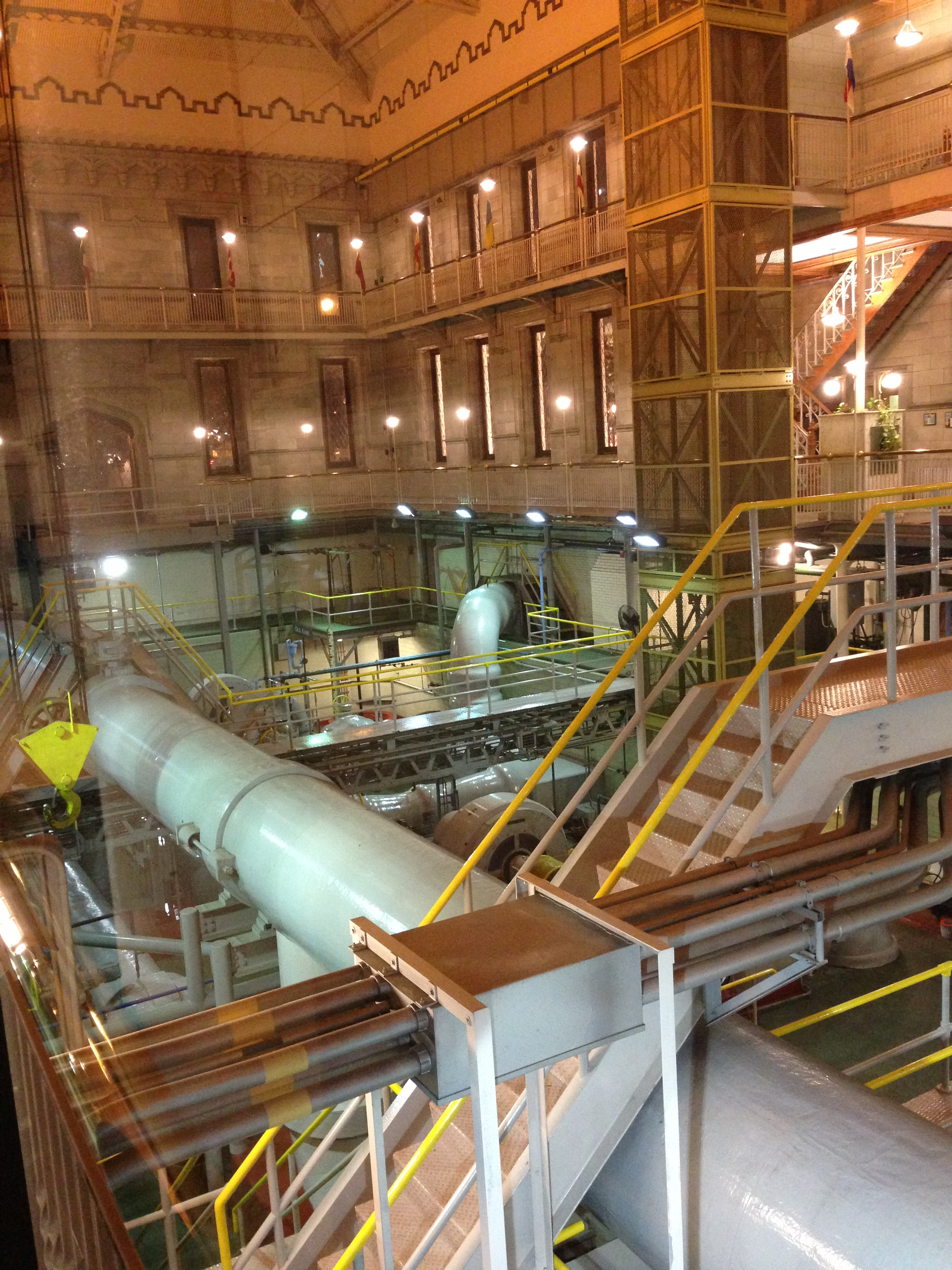
Inside the pumping station

In 2003 and 2004 the building underwent an award-winning adaptive reuse project, in which much of its interior was converted to a theater space which now houses the Lookingglass Theatre Company. The redevelopment projects carried out at this time include roof deck replacement, façade restoration, exterior architectural lighting improvements, landscaping improvements, and lead paint abatement. The remainder of the building still serves as an active pumping station, as of 2018.

=== Awards ===
The following awards were won for redevelopment and renovation:

- Consulting Engineers Council of Illinois, ACEC Engineering Excellence-State Level: Honor Award-Illinois, Structural Systems category, 2004
- City of Chicago Landmarks Preservation, Chicago Landmark Award for Preservation Excellence, 2003
- Consulting Engineers Council of Illinois, ACEC Engineering Excellence-State Level: Honor Award-Illinois, 2003
- National Council of Structural Engineers Association, NCSEA Excellence in Structural Engineering Award - Merit Award, Building project under $5 million, 2003
- Richard H. Driehaus Foundation - DePaul University, Richard H. Driehaus Foundation Public Innovator Award, Honorable Mention, Local, This award was for a combination of the Roof Deck Replacement and other Facility & Site Enhancements, including Exterior Architectural Lighting & Landscaping Improvements and Facade Restoration in which HDR was vitally involved, 2003
- Structural Engineers Association (SEA), SEA Excellence in Structural Engineering Award: Overall Excellence, Best Small Structure Category, Local, Projects under $5 Million, 2003

== See also ==
- Chicago architecture
- Water tower
- Water Tower Place
