= Kelly's Stables (New York City) =

US jazz club

Kelly’s Stables, also referred to as Kelly’s Stable, was a jazz club on Manhattan's 52nd Street in New York City, opened by jazz band leader Bert Kelly.

== History ==
Following the success of his Chicago nightclub, Kelly's Stables, in Tower Town, one of the jazz hotspots of the 1920s, Kelly opened a second venue in New York.

141 West 51st Street

The original Kelly's Stable(s) was located on 51st Street, near 7th Avenue.

137 West 52nd Street

Arthur Jarwood, who was a part owner in the 51st Street location, had also built O'Leary's Barn on West 52nd Street, which he sold to Ralph Watkins (1907–1979) and George Lynch, and in March of 1940, O'Leary's Barn became Kelly's Stable(s) — at 137 W 52nd Street.

Musicians

In 1939, Coleman Hawkins led a band at the original location featuring trumpeter Joe Guy and others with whom he had been performing "Body and Soul", the standard first recorded in a jazz interpretation by Louis Armstrong. Following his gig at the Stables, Hawkins recorded it himself with this group, and his RCA Victor recording of it is now considered "one of the best-known recorded jazz performances in history." It was inducted into the National Academy of Recording Arts and Sciences’ Grammy Hall of Fame in 1973.

Red Allen would have a six-week residency in 1941, and Hawkins would play the venue again later that year, followed by Dizzy Gillespie spending a week there during the year as a member of Benny Carter's septet, which featured John Collins, Charlie Drayton, Sonny White, Kenny Clarke, and Al Gibson. Gillespie returned to Kelly's Stables in 1943, sharing the billing with Allen and Billie Holiday for a month’s residency.

The King Cole Trio had a four month residency at the Stables from January to April 1942.
