= Anthony Joseph =

British-Trinidadian writer and musician (born 1966)

Anthony Joseph FRSL
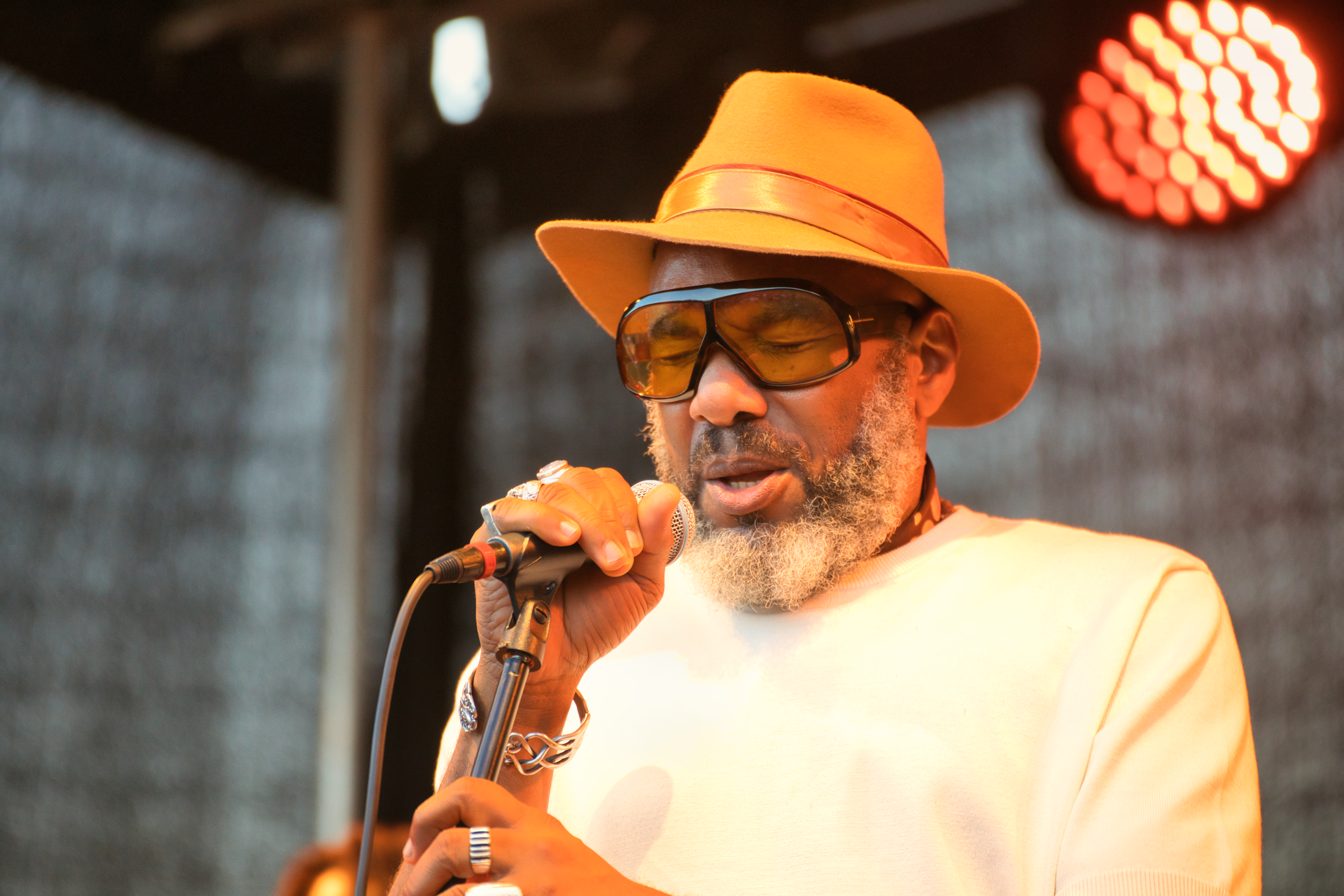
- Anthony Joseph (2025)
- Born: 12 November 1966 (age 59); Port of Spain, Trinidad and Tobago
- Education: Goldsmiths College, University of London
- Occupations: Poet, novelist, musician and academic
- Writing career
- Notable works: Kitch: A Fictional Biography of a Calypso Icon (2018); Sonnets for Albert (2022)
- Notable awards: T. S. Eliot Prize

Anthony Joseph FRSL (born 12 November 1966) is a British/Trinidadian poet, novelist, musician and academic. In 2023, he was awarded the T. S. Eliot Prize for his book Sonnets for Albert.

== Biography ==
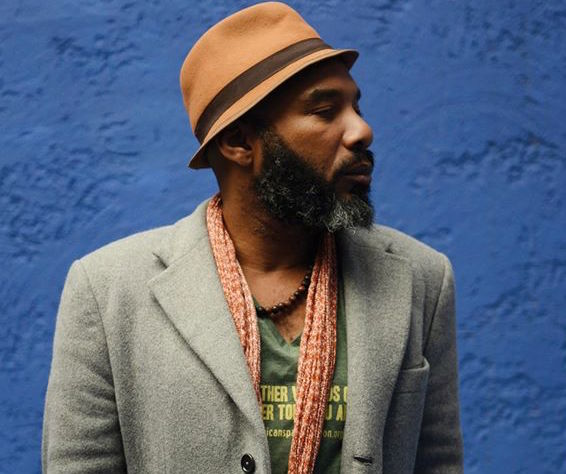
Anthony Joseph (2016)

Joseph was born in Port of Spain, Trinidad, where he was raised by his grandparents. He began writing as a young child and cites his main influences as calypso, surrealism, jazz, the spiritual Baptist church that his grandparents attended, and the rhythms of Caribbean speech. Joseph has lived in the United Kingdom since 1989.

In September 2004 he was chosen by Renaissance One and Arts Council England as one of 50 Black and Asian writers who have made major contributions to contemporary British literature, appearing in the "A Great Day in London" photograph and performing at the event at the British Library. In April 2005, he served as the British Council's first poet-in-residence at California State University, Los Angeles.

Joseph holds a PhD in Creative Writing from Goldsmiths College, University of London. He has taught at London Metropolitan University, University of Liverpool, South Thames College, and Birkbeck College.

Joseph is the author of the poetry collections Desafinado (1994), Teragaton (1997), Bird Head Son (2009) and Rubber Orchestras (2011). His debut novel, The African Origins of UFOs, was published by Salt Publishing in November 2006. Described as an "afro-psychedelic-noir, a poetic work of metafiction, mythology and afro-futurism", the book was endorsed by Kamau Brathwaite, Linton Kwesi Johnson, and Lauri Ramey, who hailed it in her introduction as "a future fiction classic". Reviewing the book, Ali Alizadeh called Joseph "both a faithful heir and an agnostic rebel; a Black poet haunted by Africa's past as well as a bilingual post-modernist amused by the possibilities of the future. Contemporary literature doesn't come a lot more sophisticated and intriguing than this." Joseph received an Arts Council award to conduct a reading tour of the UK in support of the book. In 2007, the tour continued to Europe with a 10-city tour of Germany and readings in the US.

Joseph also performs and records as a spoken-word vocalist. His debut album with The Spasm Band band Leggo de Lion was released in April 2007 by Kindred Spirits. His collection of poetry, Bird Head Son, was published by Salt Publishing in February 2009, coinciding with the release of his album Bird Head Son. The album was recorded over two days in Meudon, France, with guests Keziah Jones, Joseph Bowie, and vibraphonist David Neerman. Joseph's album Rubber Orchestras was released in August 2011. His poetry collection, also entitled Rubber Orchestras, was published by Salt Publishing in November 2011. Time, his first solo album, was released on 3 February 2013. It was produced by American bassist and singer Meshell Ndegeocello. He has also guested on albums by Mop Mop and Adam Pierończyk.

In 2012, Joseph represented Trinidad and Tobago at the Poetry Parnassus Festival on London's South Bank Centre. He has also performed with Jerry Dammers' Spatial AKA Orchestra.

Caribbean Roots was released in June 2016 by Strut Records and Heavenly Sweetness. In 2018 Peepal Tree Press published his novel Kitch: A Fictional Biography of a Calypso Icon. Kitch was shortlisted for the Republic of Consciousness Prize, the Royal Society of Literature's Encore Award, and long listed for the OCM Bocas Prize for Caribbean Literature. In 2019, his third novel, The Frequency of Magic was published, also by Peepal Tree Press.

In 2022, Joseph's collection Sonnets for Albert was shortlisted for the Forward Prize for Best Collection.

In 2023, he was awarded the T. S. Eliot Prize for Sonnets for Albert, judged by Jean Sprackland (chair), Hannah Lowe and Roger Robinson, who described the book as "a luminous collection which celebrates humanity in all its contradictions and breathes new life into this enduring form".

Joseph is a lecturer in Creative Writing at King's College London.

He was elected a Fellow of the Royal Society of Literature in 2023.

== Awards and honours ==
- Jerwood Compton Poetry Fellowship – 2019
- Paul Hamlyn Foundation Composers Award –2020
- Arts Council of England Touring Awards – 2007, 2019 & 2020
- Arts and Humanities Research Council Doctoral Research Award – 2007
- T. S. Eliot Prize, for Sonnets for Albert – 2023
- OCM Bocas Prize for Caribbean Literature – Poetry Category – for Sonnets for Albert – 2023
- Fellow of the Royal Society of Literature 2023

== Discography ==
- Leggo de Lion, 2007
- Bird Head Son, 2009
- Rubber Orchestras, 2011
- Live in Bremen, 2013
- Time, 2014
- Caribbean Roots, 2016
- People of the Sun, 2018
- The Rich Are Only Defeated When Running for Their Lives, 2021
- Rowing Up River To Get Our Names Back, 2025
- The Ark, 2026

== Bibliography ==
- Desafinado, Poison Engine Press, 1994, ISBN 0-9524152-0-8
- Teragaton, Poison Engine Press, 1997, ISBN 0-9524152-1-6
- The African Origins of UFOs, Salt Publishing, 2006, ISBN 1-84471-272-9
- Bird Head Son, Salt Publishing, 2009, ISBN 1-84471-435-7
- Rubber Orchestras, Salt Publishing, 2011, ISBN 1-84471-819-0
- Kitch: A Fictional Biography of a Calypso Icon, Peepal Tree Press, 2018, ISBN 9781845234195
- The Frequency of Magic, Peepal Tree Press, 2019, ISBN 9781845234553
- Sonnets for Albert, Bloomsbury, 2022 ISBN 978-1526649942
- Precious and Impossible, Bloomsbury, 2025 ISBN 978-1526651211
- Haunting the Black Air, Bloomsbury, 2026 ISBN 978-1526683380
