= Norman Brownlee =

American jazz musician (1896–1967)

Norman Edward Brownlee (Feb 7, 1896 - April 9, 1967) was born in Algiers, Orleans Parish, Louisiana. He was a pioneer jazz musician and led (and played piano with) a very popular orchestra in New Orleans in the 1920s, Brownlee's Orchestra of New Orleans. He also performed with many well-known orchestras and musicians of his day. His bass fiddle is in the New Orleans Jazz Museum. At least two of his recordings from 1925 are known, of 'Dirty Rag' and 'Peculiar' on Okeh Records.

He served in both WWI and WWII, as a Quartermaster during WWI and Executive Assistant to the base commander at Eglin Field during WWII. After the second war, he was employed with Bayview Memorial Cemetery, where he became Office Manager.

Norman was a lifetime member and past president of the American Federation of Musicians Local in Pensacola, Florida.
