= Kelly's Stables (Chicago) =

Bert Kelly's Stables was an influential American jazz venue in Chicago that flourished in the late 1910s. It was founded in 1915 by jazz pioneer Bert Kelly.

== History ==
Kelly's Stables was a small first-floor (second story) night spot located at 431 Rush Street, in Tower Town. It operated throughout U.S. prohibition until authorities closed it on April 5, 1930. Legendary jazz musicians performed at the club, including Freddie Keppard. Alcide Nunez and Ragbaby Stephens had the house band in the early 1920s until they were replaced by Johnny Dodds, who led a small house band from 1924 to 1930. Success of the Chicago venue led to the opening of a Kelly's Stables in New York.
