= Old Chicago Water Tower District =

Historic district in Illinois, United States

- Chicago Avenue Water Tower and Pumping Station
- U.S. National Register of Historic Places
- U.S. Historic district
- Chicago Landmark
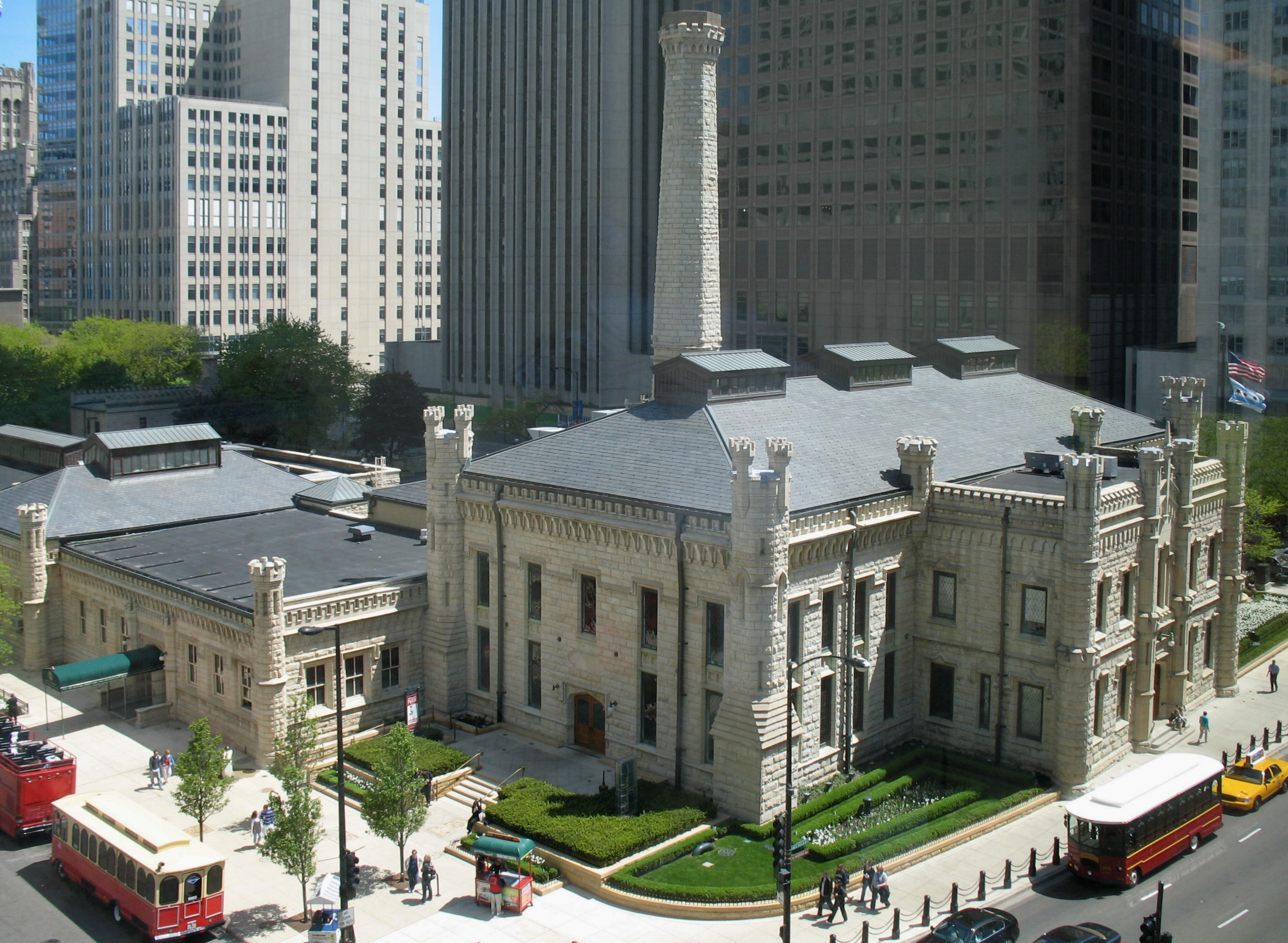
- Chicago Avenue Pumping station

- Location within Chicago metropolitan area Location within Illinois Location within the United States
- Location: N Michigan Avenue, Chicago, Illinois
- Coordinates: 41°53′50″N 87°37′26″W
- Built: 1869
- NRHP reference No.: 75000644

Significant dates
- Added to NRHP: April 23, 1975
- Designated CHICL: October 6, 1971 (amended June 10, 1981)

The Old Chicago Water Tower District is a historic district along the Magnificent Mile shopping district in the Near North Side community area of Chicago, Illinois. The district, located on both sides of North Michigan Avenue between East Chicago and East Pearson Streets, includes the Chicago Water Tower, Chicago Avenue Pumping Station and the fire house for Engine 98 of the Chicago Fire Department.

The Chicago Landmark district was first designated on October 6, 1971, and was amended on June 10, 1981 to include Engine 98. The Water Tower and Pumping Station were jointly added to the National Register of Historic Places on April 23, 1975. In addition the Tower was named an American Water Landmark in 1969. The Water Tower was also one of the few buildings to survive the Great Chicago Fire, and is the namesake of the nearby Water Tower Place.

The district was once called Tower Town or Towertown and was known for its bohemian artists and nightlife in the early 20th century. In the 1910s, artists moved into an area near Pine St (now North Michigan Avenue) that was being deserted by affluent residents. Tower Town was the resultant artistic district, and it was successful in part because of its proximity to affluent patrons who remained on the Gold Coast. A new bridge connecting the area to the Chicago Loop helped transform Tower Town into an expensive commercial district. Bars and nightclubs in the area included Chez Pierre, the Dil Pickle Club, Kelly's Stables, the Little Club, the Paradise Club and the Tent.

== Gallery ==
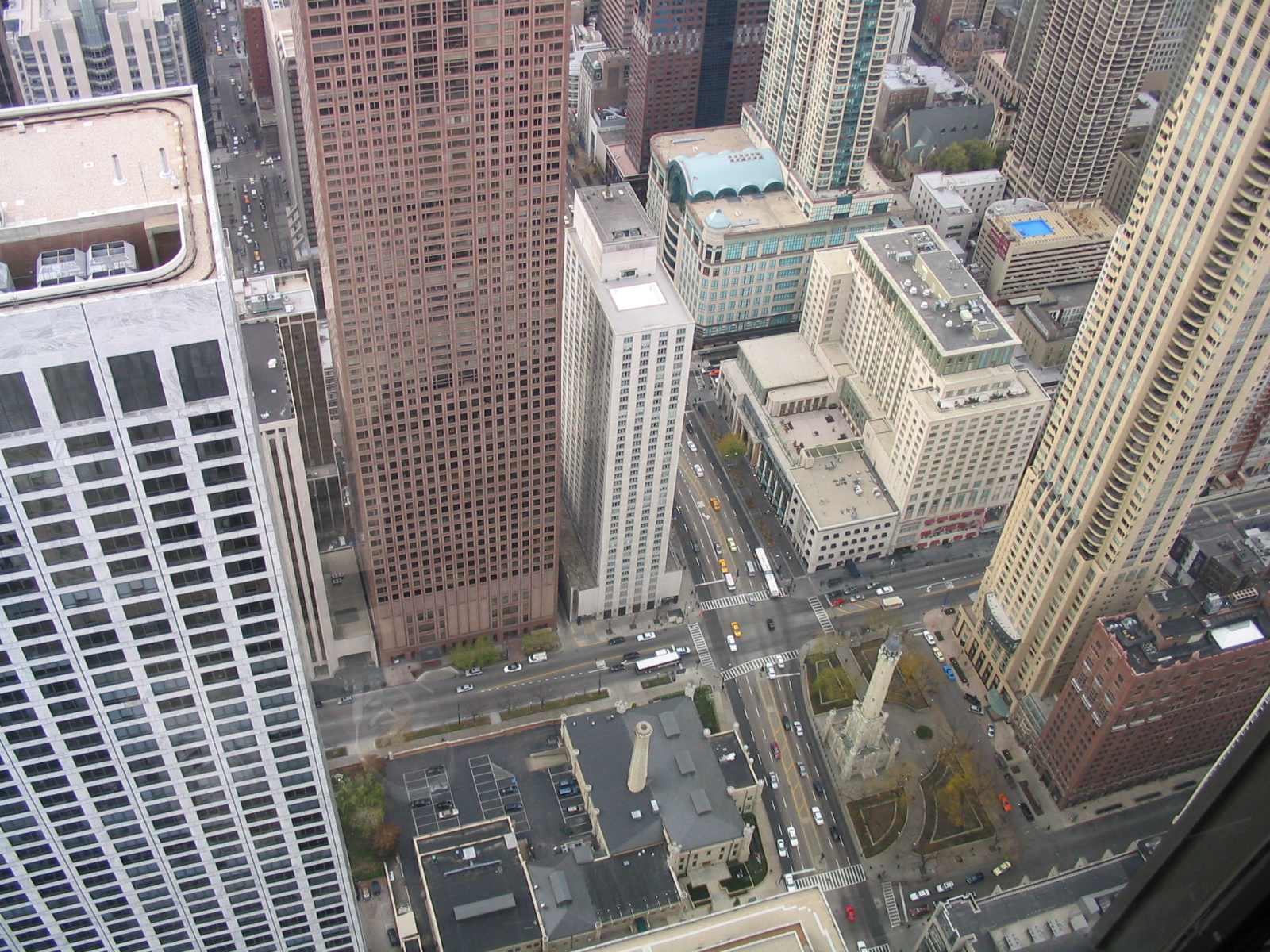
Old Chicago Water Tower District

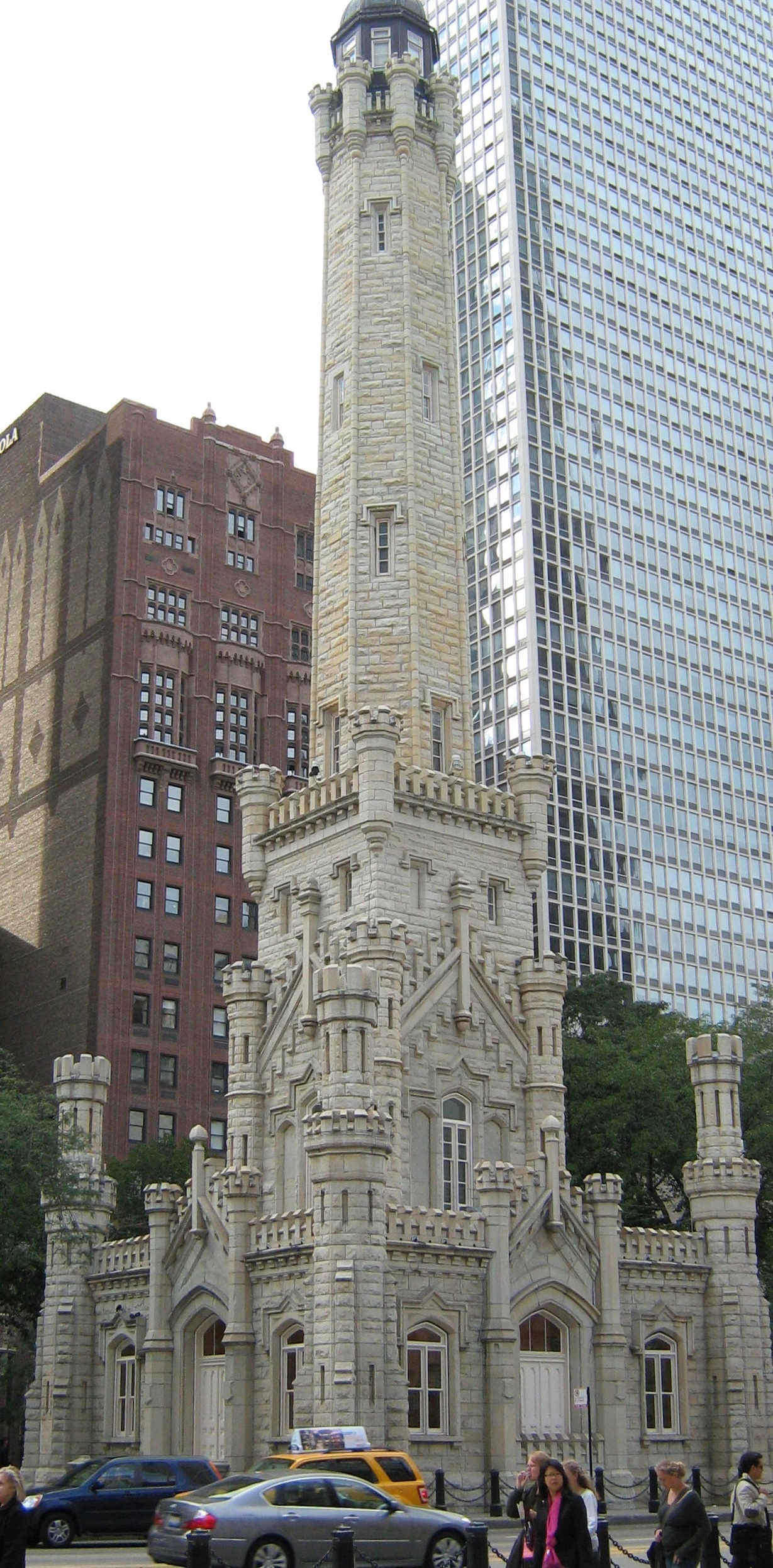
Chicago Water Tower

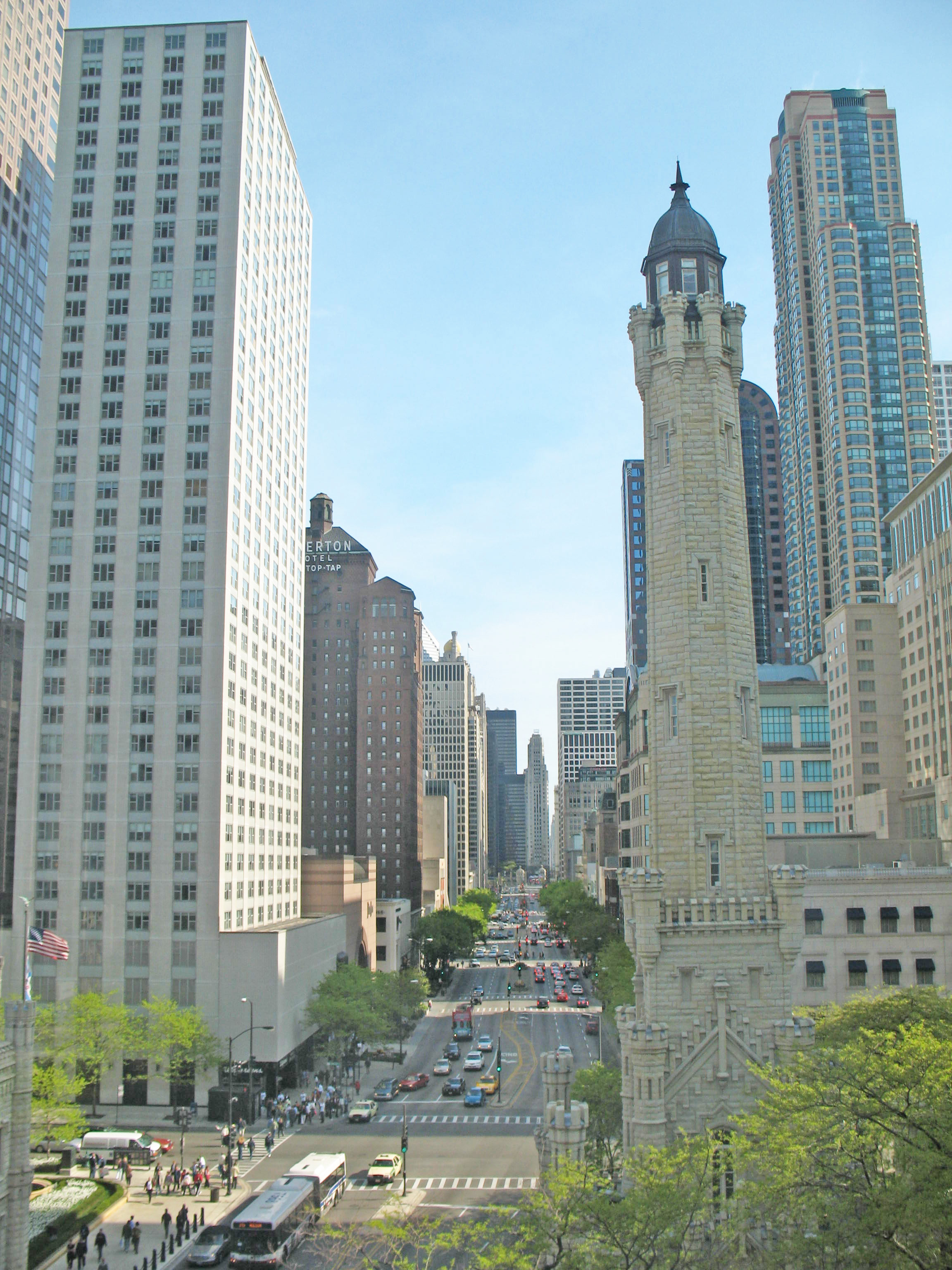
View of Water Tower's place on Magnificent Mile

== See also ==
- Chicago architecture
- Water tower
- Water Tower Place
