= The African Origins of UFOs =

2006 book by Anthony Joseph

The African Origins of UFOs is a book by Anthony Joseph published in October 2006 by Salt Publishing.

The text is an experimental, time shifting narrative in poetic prose and poetry that contains elements of Afrofuturism, metafiction, science fiction, surrealism, and mythology. It is written partially in the speech rhythms of Trinidadian nation language. It is a hybrid text that sits between prose and poetry, and features numerous formal experiments, such as comic-style drawings and poetic endnotes.

An excerpt appeared in the anthology Dark Matter (Warner Books 2000, Ed. Sheree Thomas).

== Publication history ==
- First Edition: Salt Publishing, 2006
- 20th Anniversary Edition: Peepal Tree Press, 2026
