= Water Tower Place =

Development in Chicago, Illinois

Coordinates: 41°53′52.5″N 87°37′20.5″W

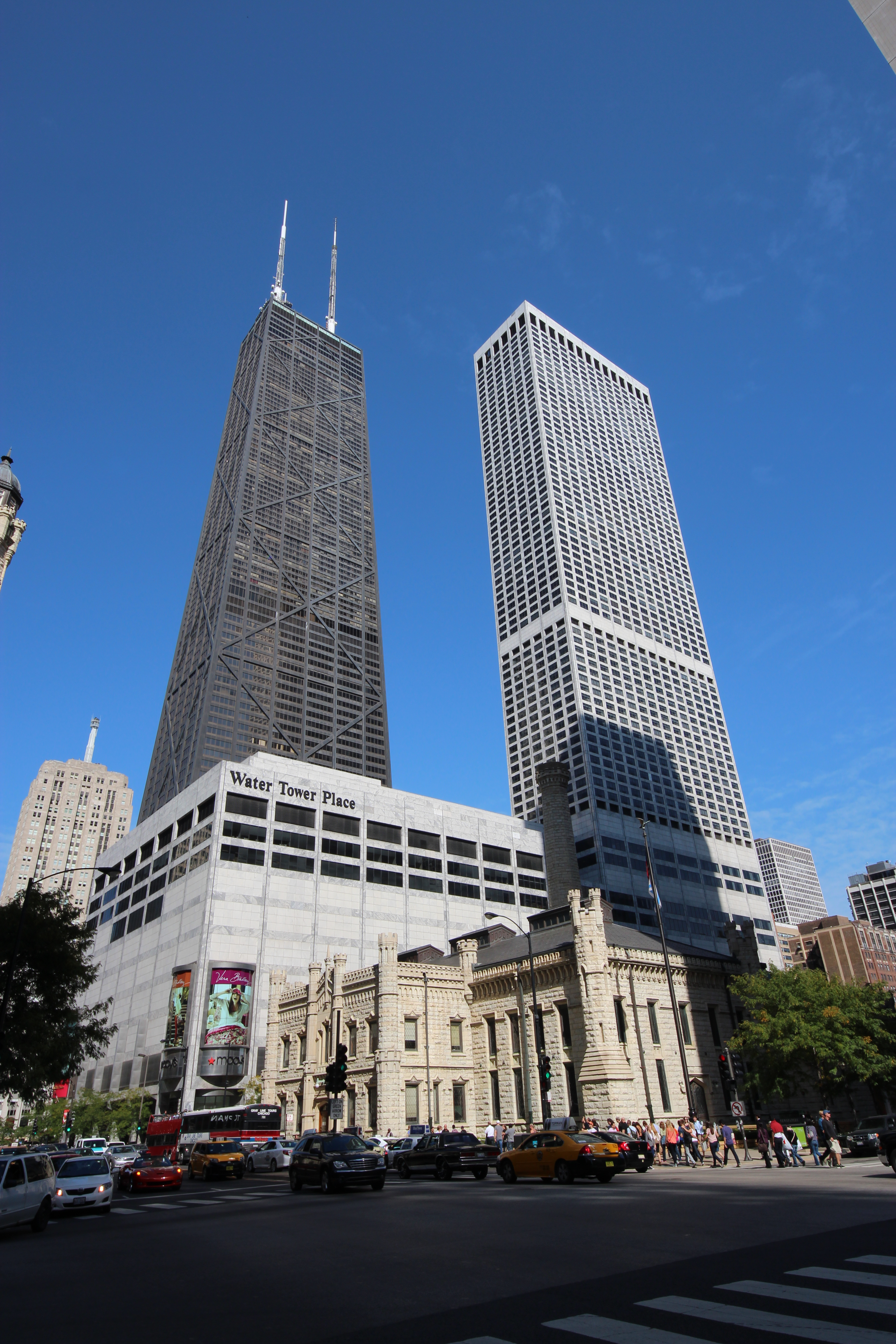
- Water Tower Place (mall on the left and skyscraper on the right) with Chicago Avenue Pumping Station in the foreground and 875 North Michigan Avenue in the background
- Location: 835 Michigan Ave., Chicago, Illinois, U.S.
- Opened: 1976; 50 years ago
- Developer: Philip Morris Klutznick
- Owner: MetLife Investment Management
- Architect: Edward D. Dart
- Num. of stores: 104
- Floor area: 729,000 square feet (67,726.3 m^{2})
- Floors: 74 in skyscraper, 7 in mall 3 in American Girl, 8 in former Macy's
- Public transit: Chicago "L": Red Line at Chicago

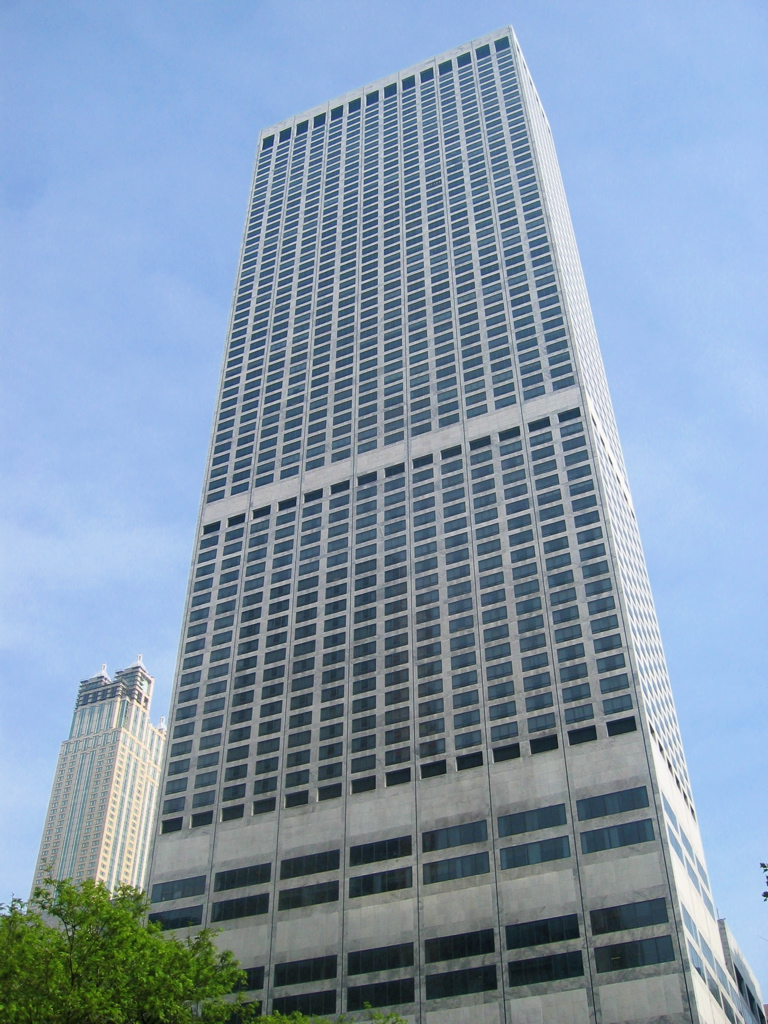
Water Tower Place skyscraper

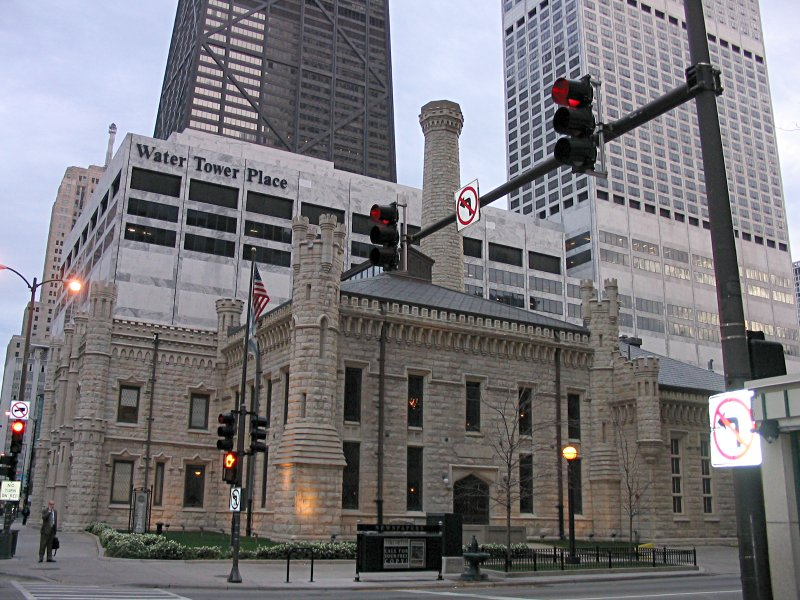
The Water Tower Place shopping mall at the base of the skyscraper, with Chicago Avenue Pumping Station in foreground

Water Tower Place is an urban mixed-use development comprising a 758,000 sq ft (70,400 m^{2}) shopping mall, Ritz Carlton hotel, and luxury condominiums in a 74-story skyscraper in Chicago, Illinois. The mall is located on North Michigan Avenue, along the Magnificent Mile. It is named after the nearby historic Chicago Water Tower, which survived the Great Chicago Fire.

In April 2026, Water Tower Place announced new plans for a $170 million redevelopment project to renovate the exterior and ground levels of the tower along with reconfiguring upper floors for flexible commercial and medical real estate.

== Shopping center ==
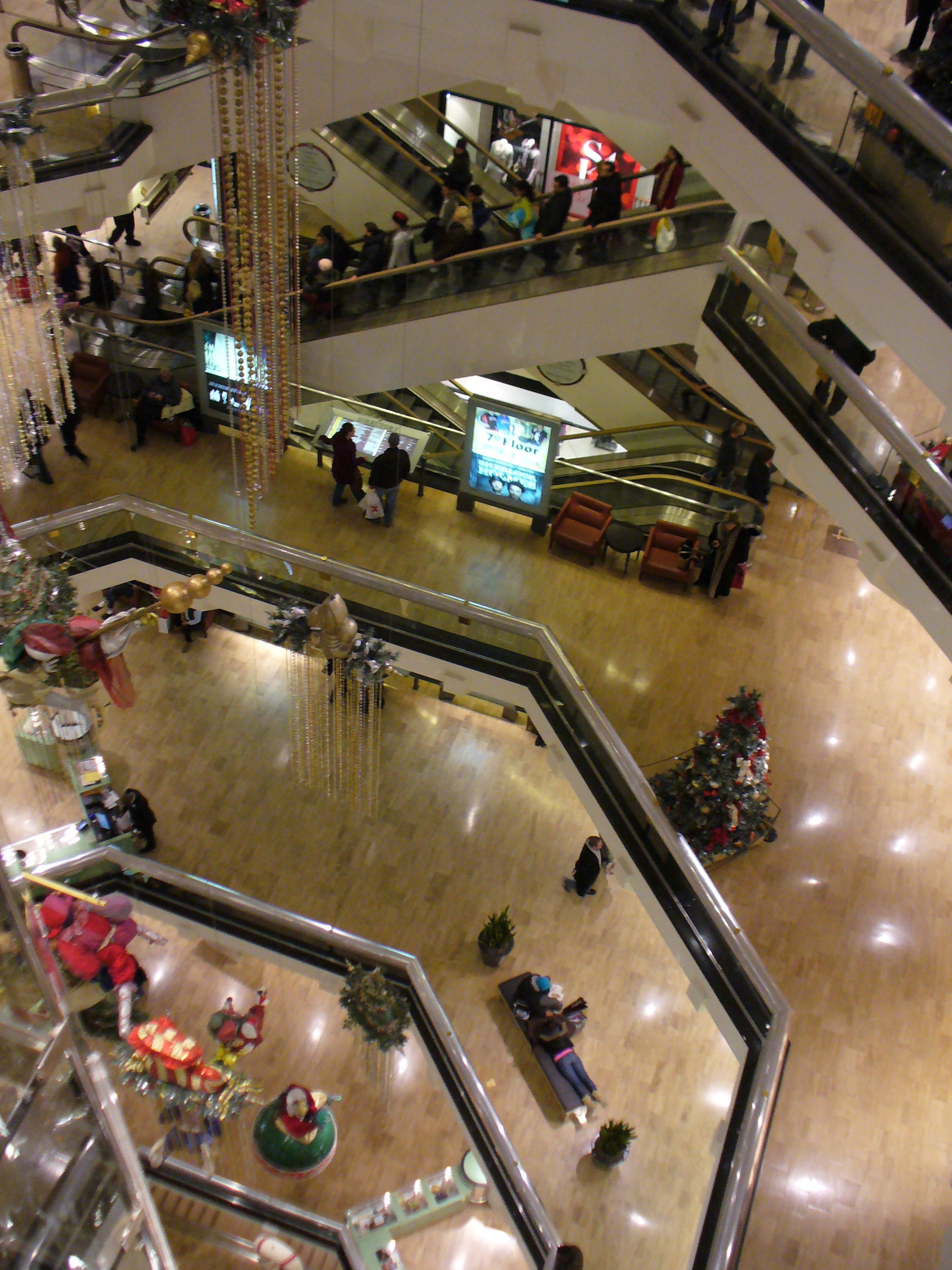
The mall in the Water Tower Place has eight levels of shops.

When the mall opened, its anchor stores were Marshall Field's and Lord & Taylor. Marshall Field's was converted to Macy's in 2006. Lord & Taylor closed in 2007. Macy's closed in 2021.

In October 2023, it was reported that the top five floors of the shopping mall were for sale, for conversion to office space. MetLife plans to downsize the mall to only the first three floors of the podium structure. Remaining stores include Akira, American Girl, Bath and Body Works, Chico's, Eileen Fisher, Express, Finish Line, Inc., Forever 21, Hollister Co., J. Jill, Lacoste, Lego, Sunglass Hut and White House Black Market.

== History ==
Originally planned in the late 1960s by the Mafco Company (the former shopping center development division of Marshall Field & Co.), the skyscraper was eventually built in 1975 by Urban Retail Properties, a company led by Philip Morris Klutznick and his son Thomas J. Klutznick. The project received a J.C. Nichols Prize from the Urban Land Institute in 1986. Modernist architect Edward D. Dart, of Loebl Schlossman Bennett and Dart, was the chief architect.

The tower section is a 78-story, 859-foot (262 m) reinforced concrete slab, faced with gray marble, and is the twelfth tallest building in Chicago and the twenty-sixth tallest in the United States. When built, it was the tallest reinforced concrete building in the world. It contains a Ritz-Carlton hotel, condominiums and office space, and sits atop a block-long base containing an atrium-style retail mall that fronts on the Magnificent Mile.

Water Tower Place's opening changed the economic dynamics of the Magnificent Mile by bringing middle-class shops to what had been a street dominated by luxury retailers, tony hotels, and expensive apartments. It shifted downtown Chicago's retail center of gravity north from State Street to North Michigan Avenue.

Richard A. Meyers Realty, Inc. and Urban Investment and Development took an entire floor in the Blair Building, 645 N. Michigan Avenue, and built several full-scale condominium units, several blocks away from the site. This combined marketing approach produced sales of over 100 units before the building was ready for occupancy, a pace that surpassed units ready for occupancy in competing buildings during the same period.

In 2001, a program of refurbishments was begun, including enclosing the exterior arcade along Michigan and adding a loading dock in the middle of the block for additional retail space. Also included were updates to the escalators and fountains leading into the mall from North Michigan Avenue lobby, as well as enhancements to the sidewalk areas, the mall's exterior facades, and department store entrances. Some of the changes included the addition of exterior glass walls and display areas for the department stores, some small specialty retail space in the renovated lobby area, and large exterior rounded, corner glass bay windows and lighted "fins" on the North Michigan Avenue and side street exterior walls of the mall. These last additions broke up the boxy nature of the original architecture and added some dimension and scale to the monolithic marble walls. The interior fountain between the escalators leading from the North Michigan Avenue lobby were also updated with a tiered "pop jet" fountain with cascading waterfalls and balls of water, controlled by computer-based choreography.

The Rouse Company acquired the center in 2002 during the breakup of the then Dutch-owned Urban Shopping Centers. In 2008, a 3-story American Girl Store replaced Lord & Taylor, which closed in spring of 2007.

Oprah Winfrey acquired four condominium units in the building. The condos were sold in 2015 and 2016 for slightly more than what she paid.

On August 14, 2020, WGN-TV announced Macy's would be leaving, although they declined to give a comment. Then in September 2020, Macy's reopened their store and all operations will continue. On January 5, 2021, it was announced that Macy's would be closing as part of a plan to close 46 stores nationwide. The store officially closed its doors on March 21, 2021. This was a part of the early 2021 downsizing by Macy's, Inc.

In 2022, Brookfield Properties turned the building over to their lender, MetLife Investment Management, due to numerous retail vacancies following the closing of Macy's, the impact of the COVID-19 pandemic, and increasing crime along the Magnificent Mile.

In October 2023, it was reported that the top five floors of the shopping mall were for sale, for conversion to office space. MetLife plans to downsize the mall, which suffers from significant vacancies, to only the first three floors of the podium structure.

In April 2026, Water Tower Place announced a $170 million overhaul of the property. The redevelopment will refresh the building facade along Michigan Avenue, overhaul the ground floor for new retail space, and reconfigure upper levels of the tower for flexible commercial and medical real estate.

== The Ritz-Carlton, Chicago ==
The Ritz-Carlton Chicago is a 435-room hotel at Water Tower Place.

The builders of Water Tower Place acquired the rights to use the Ritz-Carlton name and logo when they opened a hotel in the tower in 1975. This was before the modern Ritz-Carlton chain was established in the mid-1980s, using the same name and logo, which have been around since the early 20th century, in use at various hotels. Also under terms of the agreement, no other hotel was permitted to use the Ritz-Carlton name in the Chicago area while the agreement was still in effect, meaning that the modern Ritz-Carlton chain was never able to operate a hotel in Chicago, only a nearby condominium, which they built in 2012.

So that their hotel would be part of a chain, the owners of Water Tower Place contracted Four Seasons Hotels to manage the hotel in 1977. It was not part of the global Ritz-Carlton chain, despite its name and use of the lion logo. In 1985 the number of guest rooms was reduced to 435.

On August 1, 2015, The Ritz Carlton Chicago ceased being a Four Seasons property and converted management and operation to Sage Hospitality of Denver, operated as a full member of The Ritz-Carlton Hotel Company LLC, and participating in and marketed with the rest of The Ritz-Carlton properties.

In 2018, U.S. News & World Report ranked the hotel as the sixth-best hotel in Illinois. The U.S. News Best Hotels rankings in 2024 did not include the hotel as among the best 100 in the nation.

== See also ==
- 900 North Michigan
- Block 37
- The Shops at North Bridge
