= Razzy Dazzy Spasm Band (jazz) =

The Razzy Dazzy Spasm Band was an early New Orleans band regarded by some as the first jazz band. The band was a group of young musicians led by Emile "Stalebread Charlie" Lacoume. Other members of the group were Harry Gregson, Emile "Whiskey" Benrod, Willie "Cajun" Bussey, Frank "Monk" Bussey and a boy known only as "Warm Gravy." They also had another member who was known as "Chinee" and a singer known as "Family Haircut." This band performed in the streets of Storyville in the 1890s and early 1900s.

According to a 1936 book by the crime writer Herbert Asbury, when another band appropriated their name and musical style for a performance at the Haymarket Dancehall, the original band members pelted the stage with rocks, leading the venue's owner to change the name of the second band on all advertising to the Razzy Dazzy Jazzy Band, which some say is the first time the word jazz was used in connection with music.

The band is referred to in chapter seventeen of Anne Rice's Novel "The Witching Hour".
