= Sings a Little of What You Fancy =

Studio album by Georgia Brown with Ted Heath and His Music
- Released: May 1962
- Genres: Music hall; jazz; Cockney songs
- Length: 34:10
- Label: Decca
- Producer: Hugh Mendl

Georgia Brown chronology
Sings a Little of What You Fancy (1962)	September Song (Songs of Kurt Weill) (1962)

Singles from Sings a Little of What You Fancy
- 1. "A Doll's House" Released: June 1962

Sings a Little of What You Fancy is the debut album by English jazz singer Georgia Brown, released by Decca Records in May 1962. Produced by Hugh Mendl, it was conceived and presented by Brown's childhood friend Lionel Bart. Brown and Bart drew inspiration from Cockney songs they grew up with in the East End of London to record an album of old Cockney music hall classics she knew from local pubs, given a new jazz treatment courtesy of Ted Heath and His Music, who received artist credit with Brown, and some new, additional lyrics from Bart.

Available in both mono and stereo versions, Sings a Little of What You Fancy was also promoted with a single of "A Doll's House", Brown's favourite song on the album, backed with "Don't Dilly-Dally on the Way" on the B-side, which had been popularised by Marie Lloyd, whose influence is felt throughout the album. Contemporary music critics commented on Brown's forceful vocals and the playing of Heath's band throughout the record. In later years, Lawrence of the band Mozart Estate has named it one of his favourite albums.

== Background and recording ==
Georgia Brown grew up in Whitechapel in the East End of London, alongside her childhood friend Lionel Bart. As she lived in the area, she became familiar with the humour and pathos of British music hall entertainment, including via performers like Marie Lloyd. As a performer herself, Brown rose to prominence following her performance as Nancy in Bart's musical Oliver! (1960), which was her most famous role by the recording of Sings a Little of What You Fancy. She had begun developing her own vocal style via her experience singing in clubs in Continental Europe and the United States, with a forceful delivery that established her reputation as one of Britain's leading jazz singers.

Released as Georgia Brown's first album, Sings a Little of What You Fancy was devised and is presented by Bart, and was the joint inspiration of both. According to Bart, he and Brown decided to make the album six months into Oliver!'s run at the New Theatre in London. Drawing on their childhood familiarity with music hall, the pair curated a list of old Cockney songs and recorded them onto tape, improvising the feel of the arrangements. Bart wrote some additional lyrics and later described the sessions as "a huge ball". Hugh Mendl acted as producer, whereas Ted Heath and His Music were enlisted to provide musical accompaniments; the album is credited to Georgia Brown with Ted Heath and His Music.

== Composition ==
Sings a Little of What You Fancy collects twelve old music-hall favourites, described by Brown as "[t]he sort of songs they sang in the East End boozers when I was a girl," with a new dimension achieved by the singer and Heath's band. Specifically, the album consists of old Cockney songs – some as old as the 19th century – given an up-to-date jazz treatment, with Heath's new arrangements and accompaniments and, in some cases, additional lyrics written by Bart. The record has been described as an anthology or retrospective of the British music hall repertory, and its songs range from East End airs which are bold, cheery and vulgar in nature, to plaintive, dramatic ballads. Brown sings in a noisy, penetrating voice, with Heath's stalwart band providing musical backings. Explaining her performance of the songs, Brown said: "I sing them like jazz because really I suppose they are as much folk music as jazz is".

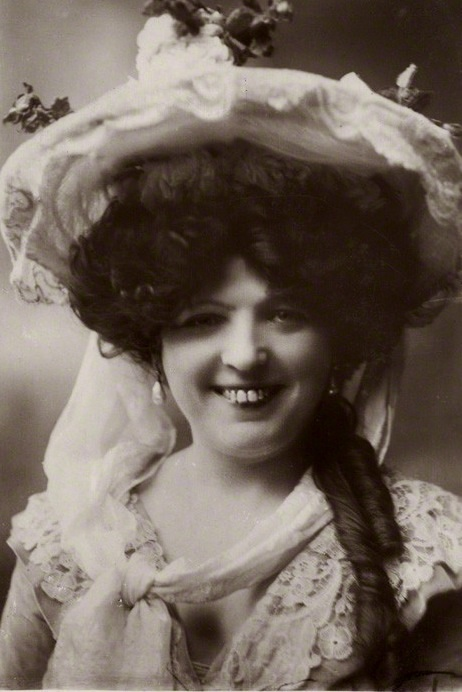
Marie Lloyd (1900), whose influence is felt on the album via songs like "Don't Dilly-Dally on the Way"

The album reflects a variety of moods, including happiness, tenderness and feeling pathetic, in songs such as "Wot Cher! (Knocked 'em in the Old Kent Road)", "Bill Bailey, Won't You Please Come Home", "A Broken Doll", "If You Were the Only Girl in the World" and "The Honeysuckle and the Bee"; the latter was, unusually, modelled on Anita O'Day's version of the song. The opening song is "A Little of What You Fancy", which gave the album its name. "A Broken Doll" is a tongue-in-cheek jazz version of the famous Cockney song with swinging accompaniment from Heath's ensemble. The song was taught to Brown as a child by her father, and was her favourite track on the album, believing it to have an "original style". She was reminded of a broken doll she owned as a child which was now was stored in a cupboard at her mother's Whitechapel home. This child relic retained vivid enough memories for the singer that she felt unable to take it out the cupboard.

Another jazz interpretation of a Cockney classic, "Don't Dilly-Dally on the Way" had been popularised by Marie Lloyd, known as the "Queen of the Music Hall". According to Country Fair, this is one example of "memories of the immortal Marie" throughout the album. Bart's two favourite songs, "If You Were the Only Girl in the World" and "Ta-ra-ra-Boom-de-ay", were placed at the end of the album. The former was originally performed by George Robie and Violet Loraine in The Bing Boys Are Here (1916), while the latter was described by Bart as "probably the most moving recording I have ever had the privilege to hear". In his sleevenotes, he wrote of the latter song:

"For this, Georgia has married all the influences in her life, and using a Brechtian approach she has portrayed an ageing woman of the streets who is now forced to live to cavort before her ex-customers inside a smoky beer hall, presenting a mad bravura which covers up a soul full of pain and hopelessness. This track brings on the full chills down the spine."

== Release and promotion ==
Sings A Little of What You Fancy was released by Decca Records in May 1962, in both mono (LK4411) and stereo (SKL4143) versions. It was one of three albums issued that month to feature Ted Heath and His Music, alongside West Side Story & Other Great Broadway Hits and Ted Heath at the London Palladium, issued through Decca and Ace of Clubs, respectively. Brown's album was also of several albums of old favourites released by Decca in the period, alongside budget albums on its subsidiary Ace of Hearts collecting music from Jimmy Durante, Eddie Cantor and Bing Crosby.

To promote A Little of What You Fancy, Decca released "A Broken Doll" as a 45rpm single in late June 1962, with the catalogue number F. 11482. It was Brown's third single for the label, and its B-side was another song from the album, "Don't Dilly-Dally on the Way". A writer for the Evening Chronicle said the single evidences the "style and delivery" that Brown is known for, whereas the Widnes Weekly News described both songs as "jazz versions of Cockney classics" and commented on Brown's singing on "A Broken Doll", saying her voice "may not be the most melodious on record but she is unquestionably one of our greatest jazz singers and on this disc her forceful style and delivery are evident." In the Nottingham Evening News, one journalist commented that the song's vocals and sentiment appealed to their old palette. Other reviewers found it "good", or said it gave Brown a chance to "show her rare talent."

== Critical reception ==
In a contemporary review for Sings a Little of What You Fancy, Roderick Random of the Manchester Evening News commented that the album exemplifies Brown's "full-bloodied, throaty sound", familiar already from her appearance in Oliver!, and highlighted the "new dimension" she and Heath bring to the music hall favourites. The Liverpool Echo noted how the former "blues chanter" Brown "lets her voice explode noisily about East-Enders' airs like 'Don't Dilly-Dally on the Way' and 'Knocked 'Em in the Old Kent Road'", noting how she "nips nimbly" between rude, bold songs like those and moving, plaintive ballads elsewhere on the record. W. A. Chislett of the Evening Advertiser called it an "excellent" album, spotlighting the "fine playing" of Heath's band but praising Brown in particular, adding: "I feel that if the original singers could hear this record they would approve wholeheartedly." In the Evening Argus, Anne Nightingale recommended the album to those wanting to hear more of Brown's work, enjoying her voice and Heath's "majestic backing". Gramophone called it an album of "cockney songs with very individual, characteristic – not just modernised – treatments."

John Mitchell Heywood Advertiser considered the record to be "off the beaten L.P. track", describing it as a partial "backward look to the days of Marie Lloyd and Florrie Forde." Mitchell complained that some oldies – such as "Don't Dilly-Dally on the Way" and "Wot Cher!" – "sound perilously close to gimmicks" in Brown's hands, but believed the slower ballads were good value, citing examples like "All Dressed Up and No Place to Go" and "The Honeysuckle and the Bee". A writer for Audio and Record Review found Brown's performance inspired and deemed the arrangements delightful, noting how they "[call] at one moment for all the virtuosity of the full Heath band and at the next for quite remarkable simplicity." Daily Sketch critic Tom Merrin noted how Brown swings music hall favourites with "the Ted Heath sound behind her", and considered the album far superior to Marie Lloyd, whereas The Streatham News's Reg Exton highly recommended the "great record", believing it would appeal to a wide array of people, and praised Brown's "different" voice. Country Fair later described the recording as "an album of ripe Music Hall songs, including the famous 'Don't Dilly-Dally on the Way'."

== Aftermath and legacy ==
Following the release of Sings a Little of What You Fancy! and "A Broken Doll", Brown had busy plans for the remainder of 1962. Newspaper articles promoting "A Broken Doll" announced the singer's plans to record two more singles in the United Kingdom before travelling to the United States ahead of Oliver!'s Hollywood premiere that August, the first in a national 'warm-up' tour for the musical before its Broadway debut in December. She also planned another album for Decca, titled As Long as He Needs Me and recorded in Hollywood with Marty Palch, and the folk opera Maggie May, written by Bart for Brown specifically. She also released an album of Kurt Weill covers in 1962, entitled Georgia Brown Sings Kurt Weill.

The musician Lawrence, known for his work with Denim, Felt and Mozart Estate, named Sings a Little of What You Fancy as one of his favourite albums ever in a list for The Quietus in 2013, recently after acquiring a rare mint copy. Lawrence hailed Brown's "brilliant" voice as "tip top, top of the tree, like Scott Walker, with perfect pitch, a perfect communicator", and enjoyed the backing of Heath's "really rocking band", calling it old-fashioned music that "sounds so modern". The musician also praised Brown's breakout performance of "Ta-ra-ra-Boom-de-ay", saying: "If you heard someone sing it in a pub you would think it was rubbish, but not her version, she brings it back to life." The album is listed in the ninth volume of The Jazz Discography (1994).

== Track listing ==
Side one

1. "A Little of What You Fancy" (Fred W. Leigh, George Arthurs) – 3:08
2. "I Live in Trafalgar Square" (C. W. Murphy) – 3:50
3. "Bill Bailey, Won't You Please Come Home" (Hughie Cannon) – 3:20
4. "For Months and Months and Months" (Joseph Tabrar) – 0:48
5. "Wot Cher! (Knocked 'em in the Old Kent Road)" (Charles Ingle, Albert Chevalier) – 1:51
6. "Don't Dilly-Dally on the Way" (Charles Collins, Fred W. Leigh) – 2:08

Side two

1. "I Was a Good Little Girl 'Till I Met You" (James W. Tate, Clifford Harris) – 3:25
2. "A Broken Doll" (Tate, Harris) – 2:23
3. "When You're All Dressed Up and No Place to Go" (Benjamin Hapgood Bert, Silvio Hein) – 3:37
4. "The Honeysuckle and the Bee" (William Penn, Albert Fitz) – 2:58
5. "If You Were the Only Girl in the World" (Nat D. Ayer, Clifford Grey) – 3:36
6. ""Ta-ra-ra-Boom-de-ay" (Henry J. Sayers) – 3:02

== Personnel ==
Adapted from the liner notes of Sings a Little of What You Fancy

- Lionel Bart – devisor, presenter, sleeve notes
- Hugh Mendl – producer
- Alex Low – photography
