= Little Old New York =

Little Old New York may refer to:

- Little Old New York, 1920 American romantic comedy play about Robert Fulton by Rida Johnson Young
- Little Old New York (1923 film), American silent historical drama based on 1920 play
- Little Old New York (1940 film), American black-and-white historical drama based on 1920 play
- Little Old New York (1850–1900), historical attraction at 1960–1964 theme park Freedomland U.S.A.
