= If You Were the Only Girl (In the World) =

1916 song by Nat D. Ayer and Clifford Grey

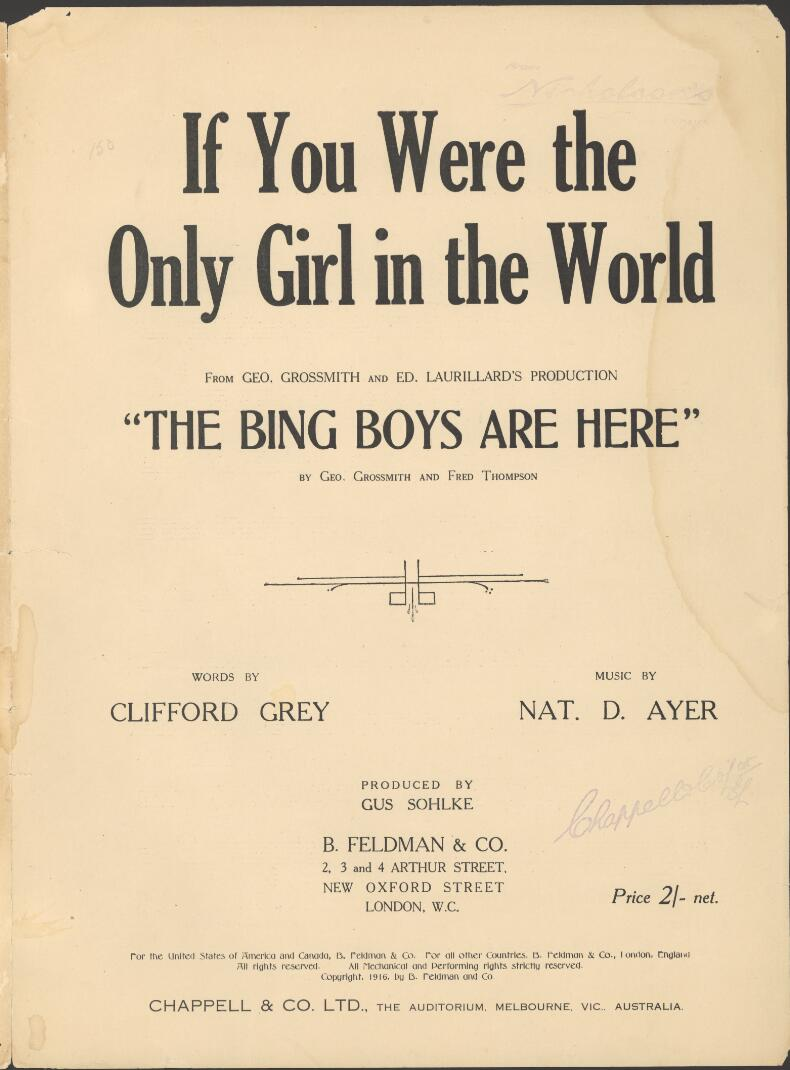
Original 1916 sheet music cover

"If You Were the Only Girl (In the World)" is a popular song, composed by Nat D. Ayer with lyrics by Clifford Grey. It was written for the musical revue The Bing Boys Are Here, which premièred on 19 April 1916 at the Alhambra Theatre in Leicester Square, London. The song was originally performed as a duet between Lucius Bing, played by George Robey, and his love interest Emma, originated by Violet Loraine.

The song was published in 1916 by B. Feldman & Co. and republished in 1946. It has become a standard, recorded by many artists. In Aldous Huxley's The Genius and the Goddess, there is a comment about this "'disgusting' song and how it comes again after a (war) slaughter..."

== Notable recordings ==
The first recording, 'the original cast recording', by the first performers to sing this song, George Robey and Violet Loraine, was released on a 78 rpm disc and became a hit. It was a popular recording during World War I, played in war zones as well as 'at home'.

- H.M. Welsh Guards - Recorded in 1929 on a 78 rpm record.
- Perry Como - recorded on March 21, 1946, and released by RCA Victor Records as catalog number 20-1857-B, the B-side of "They Say It's Wonderful". This version reached No. 14 on the Billboard Records Most-Played on the Air chart. The recording was also released in the United Kingdom by EMI on the His Master's Voice label as catalog number BD-1165, the flip side of "I Dream of You (More than You Dream I Do)".
- Peggy Lee as "If You Were the Only Boy in the World", a transcription for Capitol Records, recorded on July 29, 1946.
- Donald Peers with two pianos recorded it at the Royal Albert Hall, London, on June 13, 1949, as the first song of a medley along with "Blue Skies" and "There's a Rainbow 'Round My Shoulder". The medley was released by EMI on the His Master's Voice label as catalogue number B 9792.
- Gordon MacRae and June Hutton - for the Capitol Records album By the Light of the Silvery Moon (1953).
- William Frawley recorded his version of this song for his 1958 album of classic songs, Bill Frawley Sings The Old Ones.
- Georgia Brown - as "If You Were the Only Boy in the World", for the album Sings a Little of What You Fancy (1962).
- Kathy Kirby - as "If You Were the Only Boy in the World", for her album Kathy Kirby Sings 16 Hits from Stars and Garters (1963).
- Barbra Streisand recorded this song under the title "If You Were the Only Boy in the World", with a Peter Matz arrangement for her album My Name Is Barbra in 1965.
- Frankie Vaughan - for the album Love Hits & High Kicks (1985).

== Film and television appearances ==
Rudy Vallee sang it in his feature film debut, the 1929 musical comedy The Vagabond Lover. The song was sung by Gordon MacRae and Doris Day in the 1953 film By the Light of the Silvery Moon.

In the 1971 film The Omega Man, Charlton Heston quotes the song.

It was sung by fraternity brothers to the women of Sugarbaker & Associates at the end of Season 1 Episode 3 of Designing Women in 1986.

It was sung for wounded British soldiers by the characters Lady Mary Crawley and Matthew Crawley (played by Michelle Dockery and Dan Stevens) in Series 2, Episode 4 of Downton Abbey, set in 1918 and broadcast in 2011.

== Lyrics ==
Sometimes when I feel bad
and things look blue
I wish a pal I had... say, one like you.
Someone within my heart to build her throne
Someone who'd never part, to call my own

If you were the only girl in the world
and I were the only boy
Nothing else would matter in the world today
We could go on loving in the same old way

A garden of Eden just made for two
With nothing to mar our joy
I would say such wonderful things to you
There would be such wonderful things to do
If you were the only girl in the world
and I were the only boy.

No-one I'll ever care for dear... but you.
No-one I'll fancy, therefore love me do.
Your eyes have set me dreaming all night long…
Your eyes have set me scheming, right or wrong

If you were the only girl in the world
and I were the only boy
Nothing else would matter in the world today
We could go on loving in the same old way

A garden of Eden just made for two
With nothing to mar our joy
I would say such wonderful things to you
There would be such wonderful things to do
If you were the only girl in the world
and I were the only boy.
