= Nursie! Nursie! =

- Directed by: Alexander Butler
- Written by: Reuben Gillmer
- Produced by: G.B. Samuelson
- Starring: James W. Tate; Clarice Mayne; Bernard Vaughan
- Production company: G.B. Samuelson Productions
- Distributed by: Moss Films
- Release date: September 1916
- Country: United Kingdom
- Languages: Silent; English intertitles

Nursie! Nursie! is a 1916 British silent comedy film directed by Alexander Butler and starring James W. Tate, Clarice Mayne and Bernard Vaughan. It was made at Isleworth Studios.

== Cast ==
- James W. Tate as Patient
- Clarice Mayne as Nurse
- Bernard Vaughan as Doctor
- Percy C. Johnson as Pageboy

== Bibliography ==
- Harris, Ed. Britain's Forgotten Film Factory: The Story of Isleworth Studios. Amberley Publishing, 2013.
