= Paul Stanley (composer) =

German-born American composer and comedian

- Born: Paul Sonnenberg; February 8, 1848; Hamburg, Germany
- Died: March 14, 1909 (aged 61); Denver, Colorado, US
- Occupation: Vaudeville entertainer
- Spouse: Franziska M. Sonnenberg

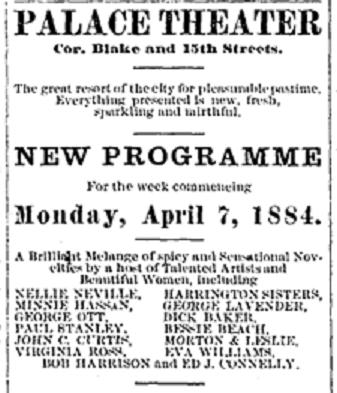
Rocky Mountain News, (Denver, CO.), April 9, 1884

Paul Stanley (né Sonnenberg) (February 8, 1848 – March 14, 1909) was a German-born American composer and vaudeville comedian who some credit (but most do not) with writing the music for the ditty Ta-ra-ra Boom-de-ay for Henry F. Sayers' 1891 musical entertainment, Tuxedo.

== Life and career ==
Paul Sonnenberg was born in Hamburg, Germany, and came to America at the age of 16, where he eventually began entertaining as a vaudeville and club comedian under a stage name, Paul Stanley. He became an American citizen in 1869 and resided in New York City for most of his life before relocating to San Francisco after the turn of the 20th century. He was married to Franziska, a native of St. Louis, Missouri, who was some six years his junior.

Stanley's vaudeville career included a stint with Wright's Comedians in a two-man act with Jay Brennan; an act billed as "Paul Stanley and his Mother-in-Law" at the Milwaukee Theatre; solo performances called "character changes" with the London Theatre Specialty Company at Boston's Lyceum Theatre; and performances billed as "Paul Stanley, the international comedian" at the Atlantic Garden in Brooklyn, New York. Stanley's claims to be the writer of the music for Henry F. Sayer's production of Tuxedo are discussed and rejected in several sources that conclude that he was not the writer.

Stanley's health began to fail after the 1906 San Francisco earthquake left him near destitute. He and his wife later moved to Denver, where he died in 1909 at the age of sixty-one. News of his death was carried in newspapers nationwide, including The New York Times, Chicago Daily Tribune and Los Angeles Times. In a column printed some two months after his death, a musician friend recalled Stanley's disappointment at failing to succeed as a composer of grand opera.

"When he lived here (San Francisco) he often talked with a quaint kind of melancholy about the high ambitions of his youth, and how they had become humbler as he got older. A man's ambitions dwindle" he once said. "like a girl's matrimonial aims. At 10 a girl wants a fairy prince and nothing less. At 20 she is resigned to a millionaire Duke. At 25 a member of Congress is good enough. At 30 a country minister will do nicely and at 35 she'll take anything from a song writer down."

Stanley and his wife Franziska, who died in 1919, are interred at Denver's Fairmount Cemetery.
