= Maggie Teyte =

English operatic soprano (1888–1976)

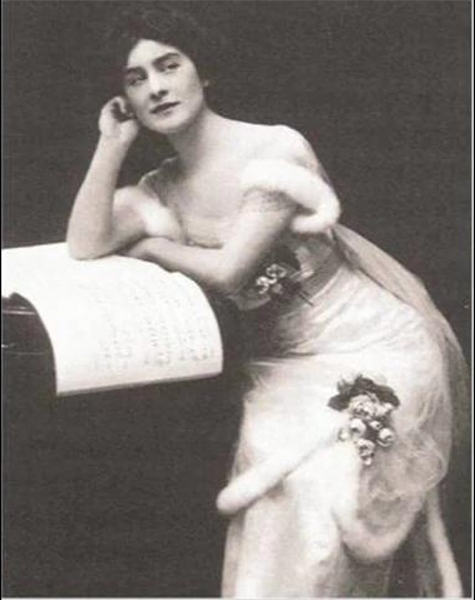
- Maggie Teyte in c. 1910
- Born: Margaret Tate; 17 April 1888; Wolverhampton, England
- Died: 26 May 1976 (aged 88); London, England
- Education: Royal School of Music
- Occupation: Operatic soprano
- Relatives: James W. Tate (brother)

Dame Maggie Teyte DBE (born Margaret Tate; 17 April 1888 – 26 May 1976) was an English operatic soprano and interpreter of French art song.

== Early years ==
Margaret Tate was born in Wolverhampton, England, one of ten children of Jacob James Tate, a successful wine and spirit merchant and proprietor of public houses and later lodgings. Teyte attended St. Joseph's Convent School, in Snow Hill, Wolverhampton. Her parents were keen amateur musicians and opera enthusiasts. She was the sister of composer James W. Tate. Her family moved to London in 1898, where Teyte studied at the Royal School of Music.

== Career ==
Her father died in 1903 and she went to Paris the following year to become a pupil of the celebrated tenor Jean de Reszke. She made her first public appearance in Paris in 1906 when she sang Cherubino in The Marriage of Figaro and Zerlina in Don Giovanni, both conducted by Reynaldo Hahn. Her professional debut took place at the Opera House in Monte Carlo on 1 February 1907, where she performed Tyrcis in Myriame et Daphné (André Bloch's arrangement of Jacques Offenbach's Daphnis et Chloé), with Paderewski. The following week, again at the Opera House in Monte Carlo, she sang Zerlina.

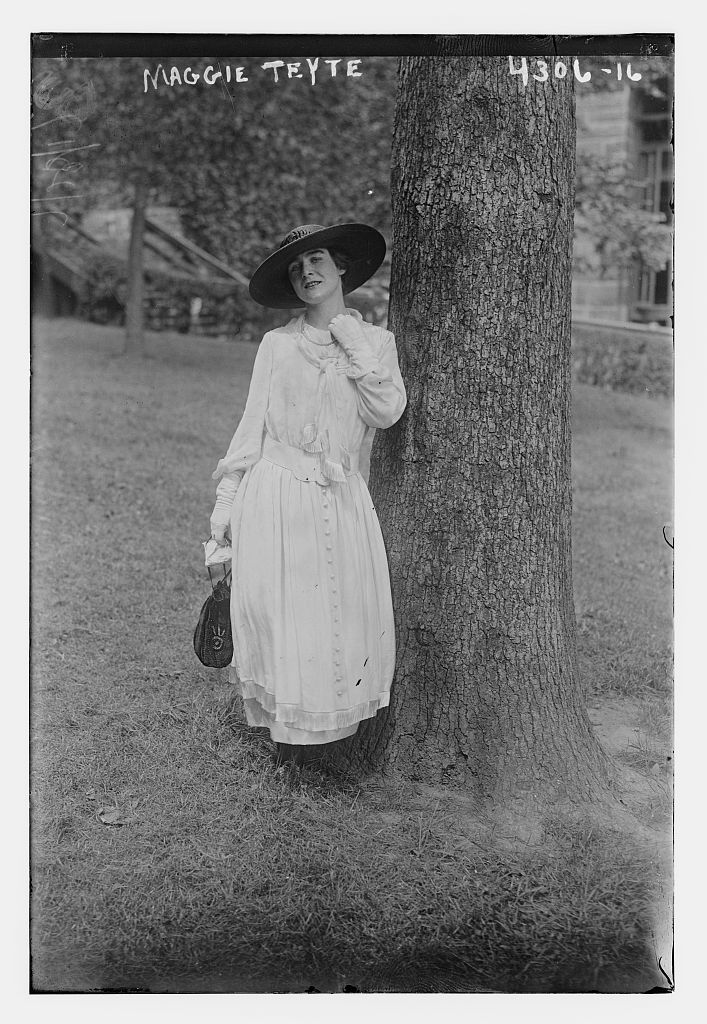
Maggie Teyte in 1917

Finding that her surname was generally mispronounced in France, she changed it from Tate to Teyte before joining the Opéra-Comique in Paris. After a few small parts, she was cast as Mélisande in Pelléas et Mélisande by Debussy, replacing the originator of the role, Mary Garden.

Claude Debussy's: The Cave

To prepare for Pelléas et Mélisande, she studied with Debussy himself, and she is the only singer ever to be accompanied by Debussy on the piano with an orchestra in public (see Beau Soir). In 1910, Sir Thomas Beecham cast Teyte as Cherubino and Mélisande and also as Blonde in Die Entführung aus dem Serail for his London season. Despite her early singing successes, Teyte did not easily establish herself in the main opera houses. Instead, she moved to America and performed with the Chicago Grand Opera Company from 1911 to 1914 and the Boston Opera Company from 1914 to 1917, singing in Philadelphia and elsewhere, but not in New York, though she created the title role in Henry Kimball Hadley's opera, Bianca, at Manhattan's Park Theater in 1918. Returning to Britain in 1919, she created the rôle of Lady Mary Carlisle in André Messager's operetta, Monsieur Beaucaire, at the Prince's Theatre.

Teyte married for a second time in 1921, to Canadian millionaire Walter Sherwin Cottingham, and went into semi-retirement until 1930, when she performed as Mélisande and played the title role in Puccini's Madama Butterfly.

=== Later years ===
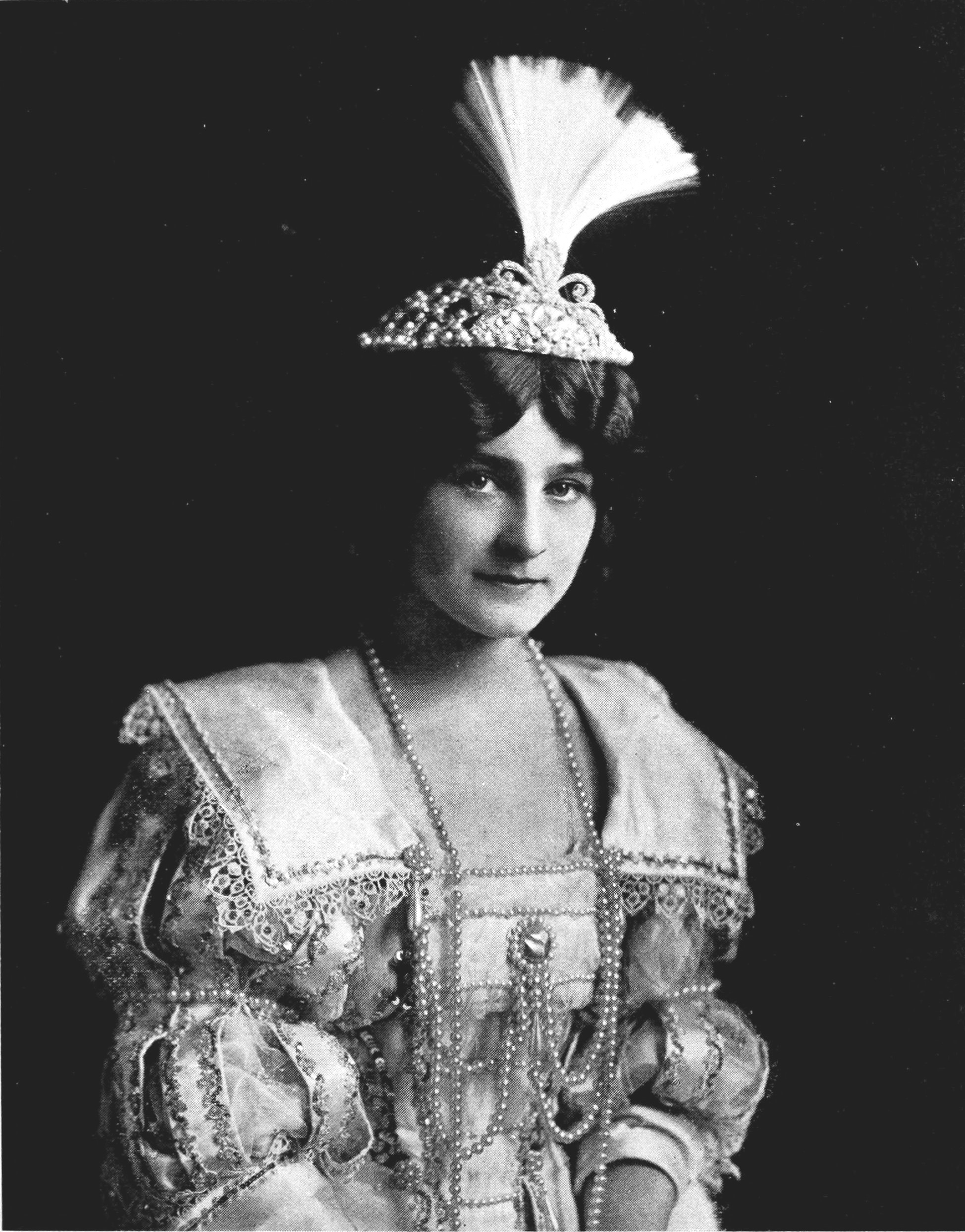
Teyte as Cinderella in Cendrillon

After difficulty in reviving her career, she ended up performing music hall and variety (24 performances a week) at the Victoria Palace in London. Finally, in 1936, her recordings of Debussy songs accompanied by Alfred Cortot attracted attention, and recordings remained an important factor in her renewed fame, as she gained a reputation in England and the United States as the leading French art song interpreter of her time. She sang at the Royal Opera House in 1936–37 in Hansel and Gretel, as Eurydice in Gluck's Orfeo ed Euridice and as Butterfly in Madama Butterfly. In 1938–39, she broadcast performances of Massenet's Manon in English, with Heddle Nash as des Grieux, in addition to an ill-advised Eva in Wagner's Die Meistersinger. She also appeared in operetta and musical comedy between the wars.

She made her first New York appearances in 1948, including a Town Hall recital followed by performances of Pelléas at the New York City Center Opera. She continued to record and perform in opera until 1951, making her final appearance in the part of Belinda (to Kirsten Flagstad's Dido) in Purcell's Dido and Aeneas at the first Mermaid Theatre in London. Her final concert appearance was at the Royal Festival Hall on 22 April 1956, aged 68. She spent her last years teaching. She died in London in 1976, aged 88.

== Personal life ==
Teyte was the sister-in-law of the music-hall star Lottie Collins, who in 1902 married Teyte's brother James. In 1909, she married her first husband, Eugene de Plumon, a French advocate. The marriage ended in divorce in 1915. Her second marriage, to Walter Sherwin Cottingham of the Berger Paint Company, was in 1921. During this marriage, Teyte took a semi-retirement and appeared less frequently in operas. This marriage also ended in divorce, ten years later in 1931.

During World War II, Teyte sang in a series of concerts sponsored by the French Committee of National Liberation for which she received the Gold Cross of Lorraine for services to France. In 1958, she was made a Dame Commander of the Order of the British Empire and her autobiography Star on the Door was published.

== Legacy ==
The Musicians' Benevolent Fund sponsors a prize in her honour. The Maggie Teyte Prize of £2,000, which is coupled with the Miriam Licette Scholarship of £3,000, is open to women singers under the age of 30. The winner is offered a recital in association with the Friends of Covent Garden for the Royal Opera House.

Her grand-nephew, Gary O'Connor, published a biography about Teyte in 1979, entitled The Pursuit of Perfection.
