= Ta-ra-ra Boom-de-ay =

Vaudeville song popularised by Lottie Collins

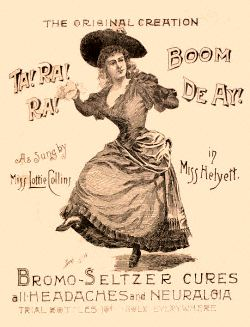
Contemporary Bromo-Seltzer advertisement in which Lottie Collins dances and sings "Ta-Ra-Ra Boom-de-ay!"

"Ta-ra-ra Boom-de-ay" is a vaudeville and music hall song first performed by the 1880s. It was included in Henry J. Sayers' 1891 revue Tuxedo in Boston, Massachusetts. The song became widely known in the 1892 version sung by Lottie Collins in London music halls, and also became popular in France.

The song was later recorded and broadcast, and its melody was used in various contexts, such as the theme song to the mid-20th century United States television show Howdy Doody.

== Background ==
The song's authorship was disputed for some years. It was popularized by Toronto-born Canadian songwriter and publicist Henry J. Sayers, the manager of Rich and Harris, a producer of the George Thatcher Minstrels who was the first to publish the song. Sayers used the song in the troupe's 1891 production Tuxedo, a minstrel farce variety show, in which "Ta-ra-ra Boom-de-ay" was sung by Mamie Gilroy. Sayers later said that he had not written the song, but heard it performed about 1890 by a black singer, Mama Lou, in a well-known St. Louis nightclub/brothel run by "Babe" Connors. Another American singer, Flora Moore, said that she had sung the song in the early 1880s.

== Performances and versions ==
Stephen Cooney, Lottie Collins' husband, heard the song in Tuxedo and purchased rights from Sayers for Collins to perform the song in England. Collins created a dance routine around it. With new words by Richard Morton and a new arrangement by Angelo A. Asher, she first sang it at the Tivoli Music Hall on The Strand in London in December 1891 to an enthusiastic reception. It became her signature tune. Within weeks, she included it in a pantomime production of Dick Whittington and performed it to great acclaim in the 1892 adaptation of Edmond Audran's opérette, Miss Helyett. According to reviews at the time, Collins delivered the suggestive verses with deceptive demureness, before launching into the lusty refrain and her celebrated "kick dance", a kind of cancan. One reviewer noted that "she turns, twists, contorts, revolutionizes, and disports her lithe and muscular figure into a hundred different poses, all bizarre".

The song was performed in France under the title "Tha-ma-ra-boum-di-hé", first by Mlle. Duclerc at Aux Ambassadeurs in 1891. The following year it was a major hit for Polaire at the Folies Bergère. In 1892 The New York Times reported that a French version of the song had appeared under the title "Boom-allez". By 1893, John Philip Sousa's band featured the song as a concert arrangement for the Columbia Exposition in Chicago. The song spread through Europe "from Dublin to Dubrovnik" and according to a 1993 article in Lloyd's News Weekly was a hit as far away as the British colony in the Pitcairn Islands. By 1900, it was featured in the music halls of England by singers such as Marie Lloyd.

Various editions of the music credited its authorship to various persons, including Alfred Moor-King, Paul Stanley, and Angelo A. Asher. Some claimed that the song was originally used at American religious revival meetings. Richard Morton, who wrote the version of the lyric used in Lottie Collins' performances, said its origin was "Eastern".

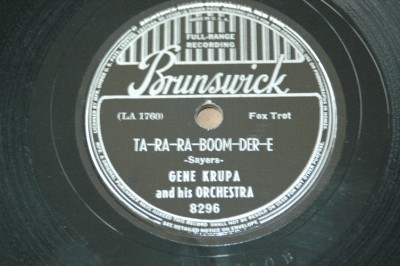
Gene Krupa's version, "Ta-ra-ra-Boom-der-e", released as a shellac record

Around 1914, activist Joe Hill wrote a version that tells how poor working conditions could result in workers "accidentally" causing their machinery to have mishaps. World War I British soldiers have sung the song to relieve the tedium of long marches, and labor protestors used it on marches as a challenge to factory management. In 1919 Sayers published a version that sold over a million copies. A 1930s lawsuit determined that the tune and the refrain were in the public domain. Gene Krupa created and performed a version in 1939. In 1954 Joe Glazer released a rendition of the song about a worker who is initially dismissive of labor organizers. After losing his savings and standard of living in the Wall Street crash of 1929, he joins the labor movement. The song was featured in the 2013 film The Immigrant.

== Lyrics ==
=== As sung by Lottie Collins ===
A sweet Tuxedo girl you see
A queen of swell society
Fond of fun as fond can be
When it's on the strict Q.T.
I'm not too young, I'm not too old
Not too timid, not too bold
Just the kind you'd like to hold
Just the kind for sport I'm told

Chorus

Ta-ra-ra Boom-de-re! (sung eight times)

I'm a blushing bud of innocence
Papa says at big expense
Old maids say I have no sense
Boys declare, I'm just immense
Before my song I do conclude
I want it strictly understood
Though fond of fun, I'm never rude
Though not too bad I'm not too good

Chorus

A sweet tuxedo girl you see
A queen of swell society
Fond of fun as fond can be
When it's on the strict Q.T.
I'm not too young, I'm not too old
Not too timid, not too bold
Just the kind you'd like to hold
Just the kind for sport I'm told

Chorus

=== As laundered and published by Henry J. Sayers as sheet music ===
A smart and stylish girl you see,
Belle of good society
Not too strict but rather free
Yet as right as right can be!
Never forward, never bold
Not too hot, and not too cold
But the very thing, I'm told,
That in your arms you'd like to hold.

Chorus

Ta-ra-ra Boom-de-ay! (sung eight times)

I'm not extravagantly shy
And when a nice young man is nigh
For his heart I have a try
And faint away with tearful cry!
When the good young man in haste
Will support me round the waist
I don't come to while thus embraced
Till of my lips he steals a taste!

Chorus

I'm a timid flow'r of innocence
Pa says that that I have no sense,
I'm one eternal big expense
But men say that I'm just "immense!"
Ere my verses I conclude
I'd like it known and understood
Though free as air, I'm never rude
I'm not too bad and not too good!

Chorus

You should see me out with Pa,
Prim, and most particular;
The young men say, "Ah, there you are!"
And Pa says, "That's peculiar!"
"It's like their cheek!" I say, and so
Off again with Pa I go –
He's quite satisfied – although,
When his back's turned – well, you know –

Chorus

== Other lyrics ==
Since the early 20th century, the widely recognizable melody has been re-used for numerous other songs, children's camp songs, parodies, and military ballads. It was used for the theme song to the United States television show Howdy Doody (as "It's Howdy Doody Time").

== Recordings ==
External audio
- You may hear "Ta-ra-ra Boom-de-ay" sung by Mary Martin in 1942; Here on archive.org

"Ta-ra-ra Boom-de-ay" has been recorded and arranged by performers in a wide variety of musical arrangements. In 1942, Mary Martin performed a big band arrangement of the song on American radio.

In 1954, John Serry Sr. recorded an easy listening arrangement with two accordions, vibes, string bass, guitar, drums and piano for RCA Thesaurus. Knuckles O'Toole released a Honkey tonk arrangement in 1956 on Grand Award Records. The Dukes of Dixieland offered a Dixieland jazz arrangement in 1958 on the Audio Fidelity label. In 1959, the song was interpreted in a spoof arrangement for orchestra by Spike Jones.

In 1960, the song was reinterpreted by Mitch Miller and his Sing-Along Chorus in a jazz vocal version on the Golden Record label. The same year, Cokney London released a folksy recording of the song for Verve Records and Arthur Fiedler recorded a version with the Boston Pops in 1960. 1n 1969, Georgia Brown released the song in the music hall style on the Decca Eclipse label, for the album Sings a Little of What You Fancy.

Elmo and friends performed the song on a 2018 disc.

== Legacy ==
The 1893 Gilbert & Sullivan comic opera Utopia, Limited has a character called Tarara, the "public exploder". A 1945 British film of the same name describes the history of music hall theatre. From 1974 to 1988 the Disneyland park in Anaheim, California, included a portion of the song in their musical revue attraction America Sings, in the finale of Act 3 – The Gay 90s.

Books using the title in their titles include Ta-Ra-Ra-Boom-De-Ay: The Dodgy Business of Popular Music, by Simon Napier-Bell, and the songbook Ta-ra-ra Boom-de-ay: Songs for Everyone edited by David Gadsby and Beatrice Harrop.
