= Clarice Mayne =

English singer (1886–1966)

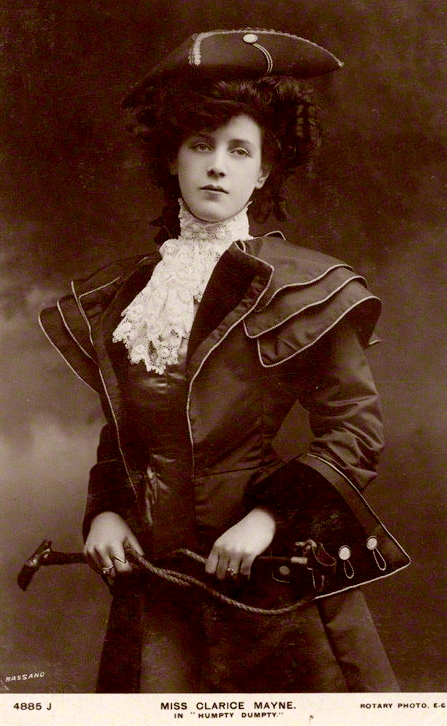
- Mayne in Humpty Dumpty in the 1910s

Background information
- Born: Clarice Mabel Dulley; 6 February 1886; London, England
- Died: 16 January 1966 (aged 79) London, England
- Genres: Music hall; variety theatre
- Occupations: Singer, performer

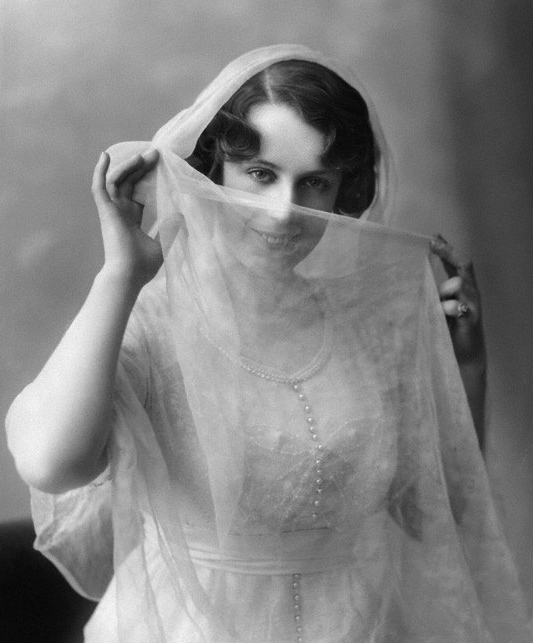
Clarice Mayne in 1911

Clarice Mayne (born Clarice Mabel Dulley; 6 February 1886 – 16 January 1966) was an English music hall and variety theatre singer and performer.

== Life and career ==
Clarice Mabel Dulley was born in London in 1886. She took the stage name Clarice Mayne, and is best known for the song "A Broken Doll" written by her husband, the composer James W. Tate, and lyricist Frank Clifford Harris.

Early in her career, Mayne often played the "principal girl" in pantomimes for Francis Laidler, among others. She also became a noted music hall performer. Later, she played the "principal boy" roles.

Mayne sang in the variety theatre act called "Clarice Mayne and That". Mayne was "This", and Tate, accompanying on the piano, was "That" ("This sings, That Plays!"). They first appeared together at “The Oxford” in 1906 and introduced a number of popular numbers including “I was a Good little girl, ‘till I met You” (1912), and “Put on Your Ta-Ta little Girlie”, both written by Tate. She popularised the 1910 hit 'Joshu-ah' by George Arthurs and Bert Lee. She and Tate married in 1912 after the death of Tate's first wife, Lottie Collins. Tate died in 1922, and Mayne married Teddy Knox of Nervo and Knox in 1934.

Mayne also played the principal boy in a number of Tate's pantomimes throughout Britain beginning in World War I, including a pantomime version of Cinderella in 1916, Dick Whittington in 1918, Puss In Boots in 1920, Cinderella again, at the London Hippodrome in 1922 (and many times thereafter, playing with Stanley Lupino and her later husband, Teddy Knox), and Dick Whittington again in 1923, at the London Palladium, among others.

In 1936, she played Emily Hackitt in the film Educated Evans. She and Tate had appeared together in the 1916 film Nursie! Nursie!

She died in London in 1966 at the age of 79 and was cremated at Golders Green Crematorium.

== Selected filmography ==
- Nursie! Nursie! (1916)
