= Bernard Vaughan (actor) =

British actor

Bernard Vaughan was a British actor of the silent era.

== Selected filmography ==
- The Valley of Fear (1916)
- The Second Mrs. Tanqueray (1916)
- Nursie! Nursie! (1916)
- Rock of Ages (1918)
- Linked by Fate (1919)
- Lady Tetley's Decree (1920)
- The Alley of Golden Hearts (1924)
- God's Clay (1928)
