= Lady Tetley's Decree =

1920 British silent drama film

- Directed by: Fred Paul
- Release date: 1920
- Country: United Kingdom
- Language: Silent

Lady Tetley's Decree is a 1920 British silent drama film directed by Fred Paul and starring Marjorie Hume, Hamilton Stewart and Philip Hewland. Its plot follows a man whose political career is threatened due to a dispute with his wife provoked by a plot led by a Foreign Office rival of the husband. It was based on a play by Sybil Downing.

The film had five reels.

== Cast ==
- Marjorie Hume as Lady Rachel Tetly
- Hamilton Stewart as Sir Oliver Tetley
- Philip Hewland as Robert Trentham
- Basil Langford as Ronald Tetley
- Sydney Lewis Ransome as Lionel Crier
- Bernard Vaughan as Lord Herondale

== Production ans release ==
The film production was announced in April 1919. The film was theatrically shown in the United States in July 1921.
