= Miss Manhattan =

Miss Manhattan is a musical in three acts with a libretto by George V. Hobart and music co-composed by F. Puehringer and Herman Perlet. It opened on Broadway at Wallack's Theatre on March 23, 1897. It ran there for a total of 40 performances. Theatre historian Gerald Bordman stated that the plot was "suspiciously like" the story used for the 1896 musical Miss Philadelphia which had played in the City of Brotherly Love. The show was directed by Max Freeman. The cast included Harry Watson Jr. and Mamie Gilroy.

The New York Herald critic deemed the show a "midway between success and failure". The New York Times review stated "the novelty was a brass band made up of women, who played a spirited march for the evolutions of the regulation "Amazons", which this time took the shape of a foot parade of Squadron A, and introduced some novel figures. The march was a decided hit."
