= Harry Watson Jr. =

American actor and comedian (1876–1930)

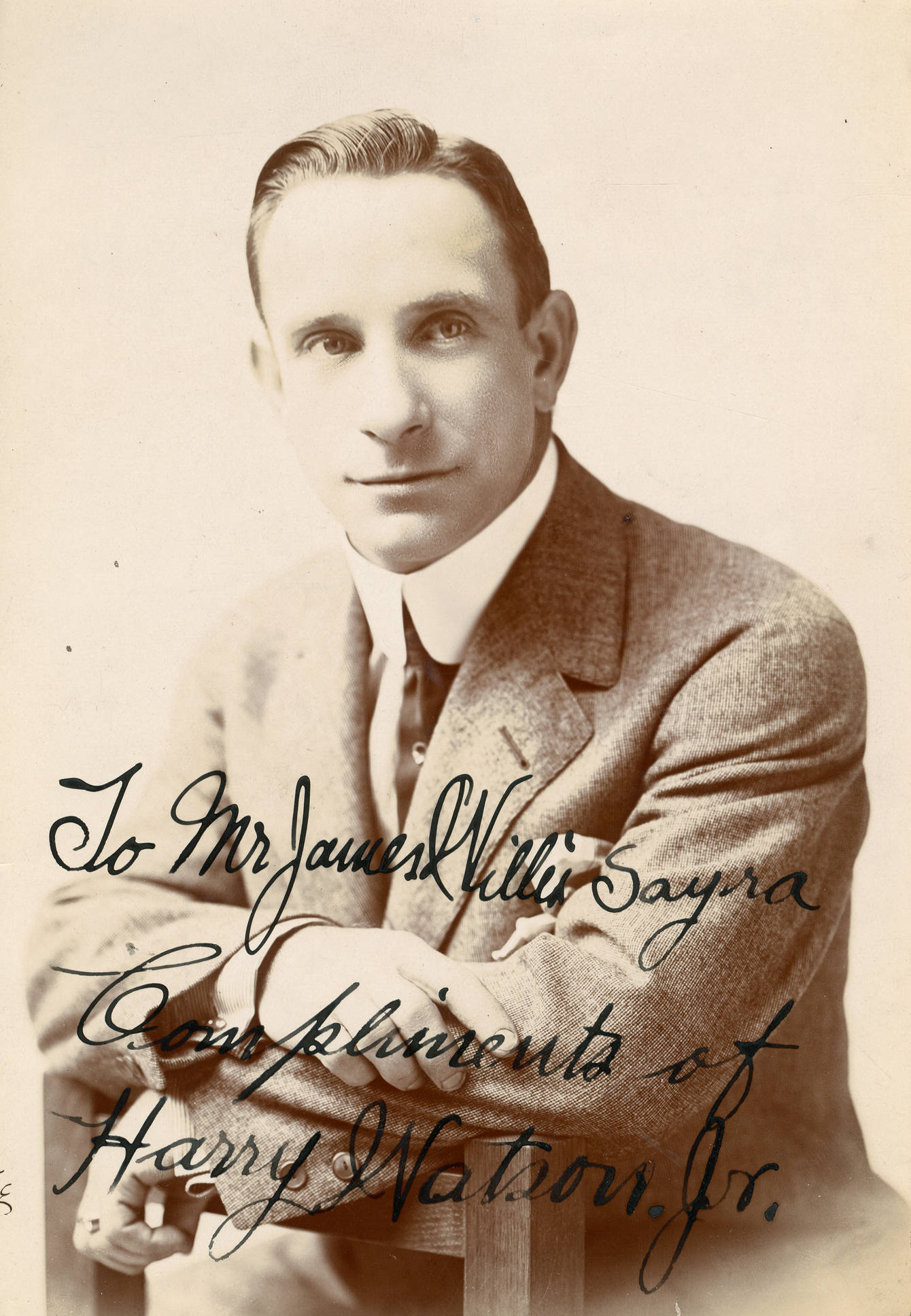
- Watson Jr. in 1912
- Born: Harry B. Watson Jr. June 12, 1876; Saginaw, Michigan, U.S.
- Died: September 23, 1930 (aged 54); Monrovia, California, U.S.
- Occupations: Actor; Broadway performer; vaudevillian; comedian
- Years active: 1910–1930

Harry Watson Jr. (June 12, 1876 – September 23, 1930), also known as Harry B. Watson, was an American actor and comedian. Before his vaudeville, Broadway and film careers, he was a clown for Ringling Bros. and Barnum & Bailey Circus. Among his Broadway shows were the musical Tip-Toes and five editions of the Ziegfeld Follies.

== Career ==
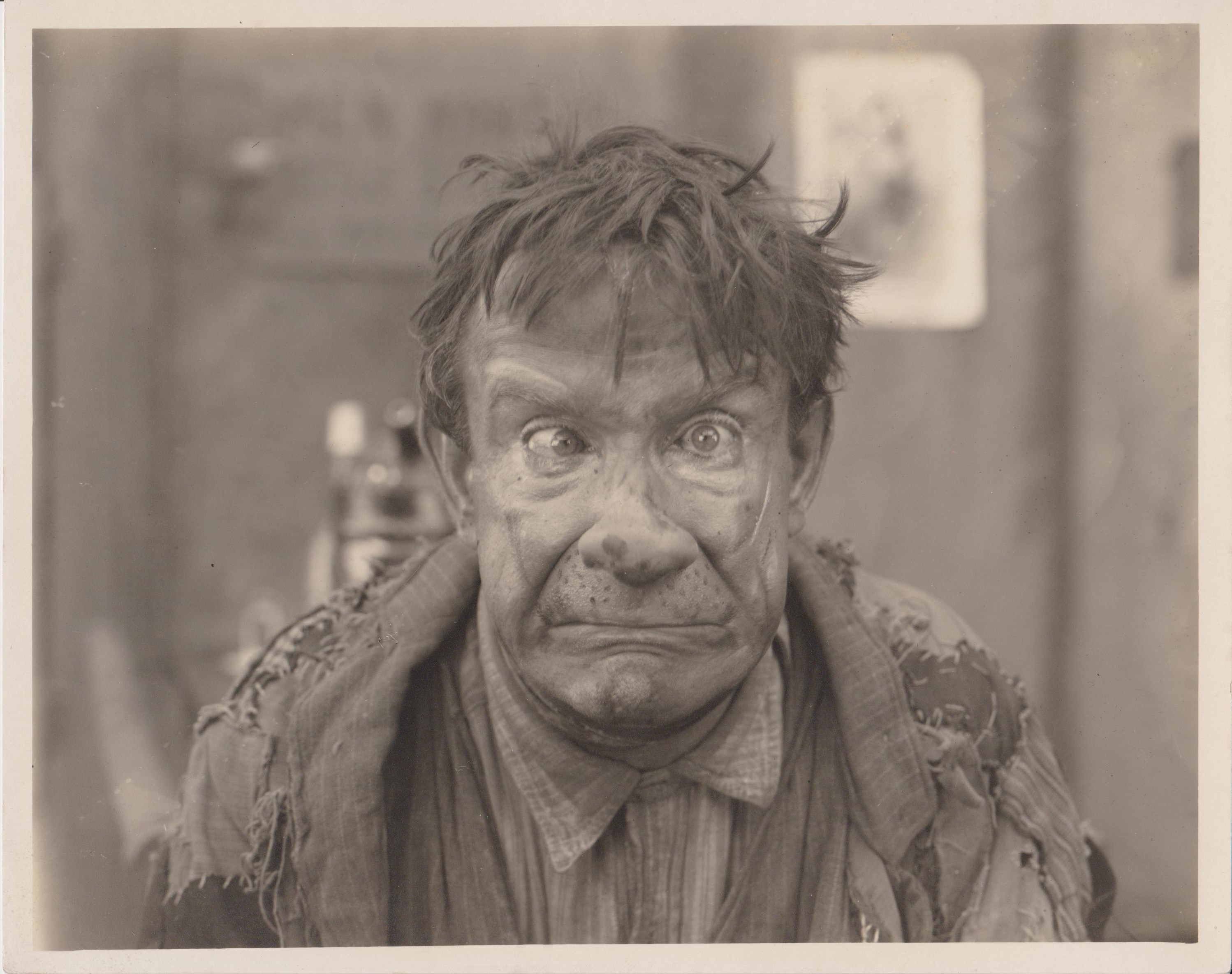
Harry Watson Jr. as "Musty Suffer"

The highest-profile of Watson's few feature films were with Marion Davies and silent film star Harrison Ford: Little Old New York and Zander the Great, two of his three Hearst Cosmopolitan Productions. Watson is perhaps best recalled today as the star of a series of bizarre silent comedy shorts, The Mishaps of Musty Suffer.

== Legacy ==
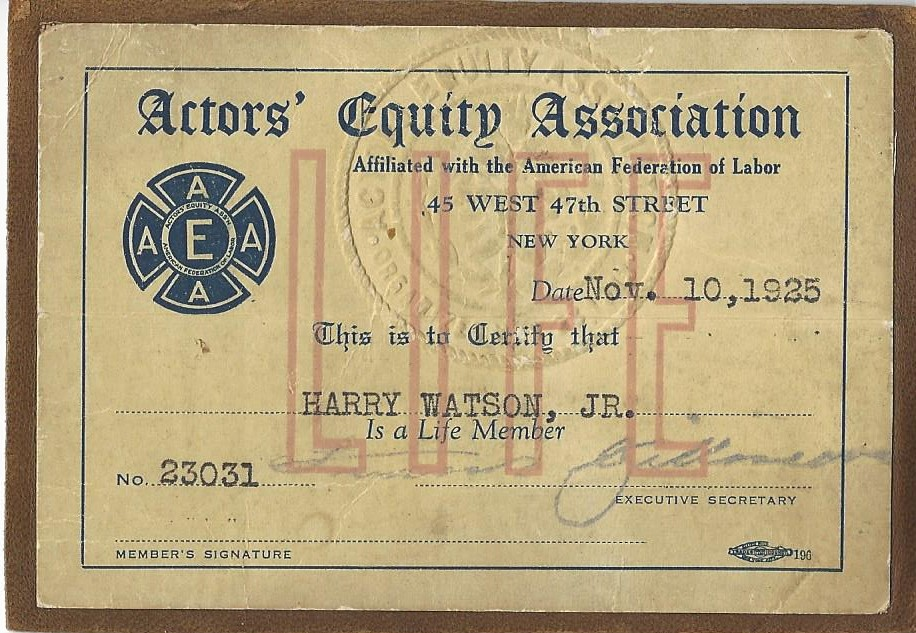
Harry Watson Jr. Actors' Equity Association card

That Mr. Harry Watson Jr., is one of the finest comic artists of the American stage is demonstrated anew with each successive year. An alumnus of the same burlesque troupe that graduated that other excellent comedian, Mr. George Bickel, Watson's authentic talents, like those of his colleague, have long been overlooked — or if not entirely overlooked, greatly disparaged — by annalists of the stage who vouchsafe to low comedy merely a casual and then grudged attention. Yet the fact doubtless remains that this Watson is an actor of uncommon quality, not a mere slapstick pantaloon, an assaulter of trousers' seats, a professor of the bladder, but a mimic of exceptional capacity, a pantomimist of the very first grade and a comedian of real histrionic parts..

— George Jean Nathan, Comedians All

Two volumes of surviving Musty Suffer titles—many featuring Watson's comedy partner, George Bickel—were restored by the American Library of Congress and released with music by Ben Model on DVD by Undercrank Productions in 2014 and 2015.

== Filmography ==
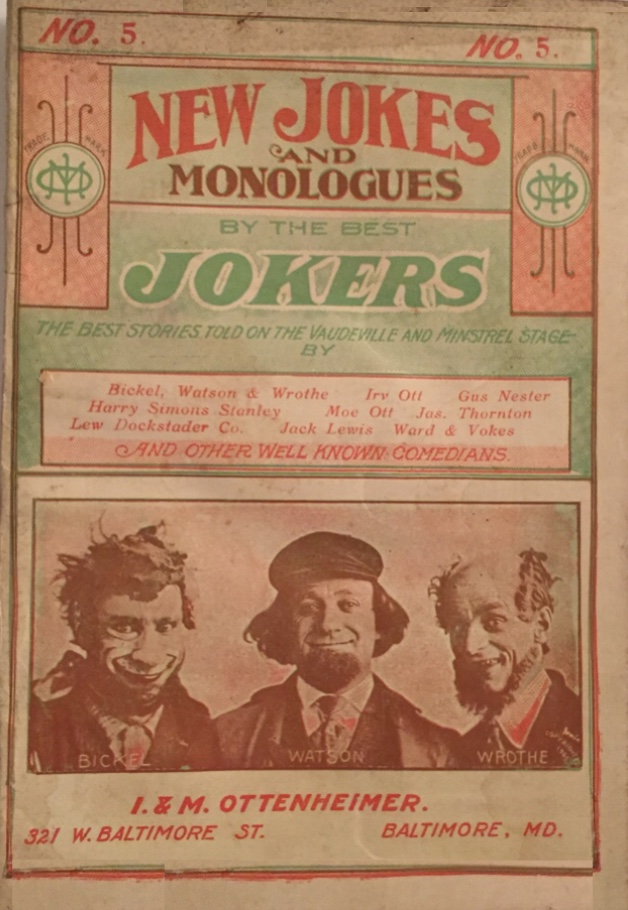
Watson, Bickel (names reversed), and Wrothe

- Rubeville Night Club (short 1930)
- Irish Fantasy (short 1929)
- Rubeville (short 1929)
- Fifty Miles from Broadway (short 1929)
- Zander the Great (1925)
- The Great White Way (1924)
- Little Old New York (1923)
- Musty's Vacation (short 1917)
- Musty B. Young (short 1917)
- Starlight Sleep (short 1917)
- Spliced and Iced (short 1917)
- Pure and Simple (short 1917)
- The Ladder of Fame (short 1917)
- Truly Rural (short 1917)
- Wet and Dry (short 1917)
- The Soda Jerker (short 1917)
- The Fried Egg Hero (short 1917)
- Fore and Aft (short 1916)
- The Fable of How Wisenstein Did Not Lose Out to Buttinsky (short 1916)
- Partly Cloudy (short 1916)
- Active Service (short 1916)
- Outs and Ins (short 1916)
- Strictly Private (short 1916)
- A Pirate Bold (short 1916)
- Local Showers (short 1916)
- While You Wait (short 1916)
- Showing Some Speed (short 1916)
- Blow Your Horn (short 1916)
- Coming Down (short 1916)
- Out of Order (short 1916)
- Just Imagination (short 1916)
- Bells and Belles (short 1916)
- The Lightning Bell-Hop (short 1916)
- Look Out Below (short 1916)
- Going Up (short 1916)
- Hold Fast! (short 1916)
- Cruel and Unusual (short 1916)
- The Politicians (1915)
- Keep Moving (1915)
- The Fixer (1915)
- Actors' Fund Field Day (short 1910)

== Broadway ==
- Tip-Toes (Dec 28, 1925 - Jun 12, 1926)
- The Passing Show of 1921 (Dec 29, 1920 - May 28, 1921)
- Odds and Ends of 1917 (Nov 19, 1917 - Feb 23, 1918)
- Ziegfeld Follies of 1912 (Oct 21, 1912 - Jan 04, 1913)
- Ziegfeld Follies of 1911 (Jun 26, 1911 - Sep 02, 1911)
- Ziegfeld Follies of 1910 (Jun 20, 1910 - Sep 03, 1910)
- The Silver Star (Nov 01, 1909 - Feb 1910)
- Ziegfeld Follies of 1908 (Jun 15, 1908 - Sep 26, 1908)
- Ziegfeld Follies of 1907 (Jul 08, 1907 - Nov 10, 1907)
- The Mimic and the Maid (Jan 11, 1907 - Jan 12, 1907)
- Tom, Dick and Harry (Sep 25, 1905 - Jan 20, 1906)
- Me, Him and I (Dec 26, 1904 - Jan 28, 1905)
- Miss Manhattan (Mar 23, 1897 - closing date unknown)
