= Tom, Dick and Harry (musical) =

Musical two acts with music by Egbert Van Alstyne

Tom, Dick and Harry is a musical two acts with music by Egbert Van Alstyne. The show's book and lyrics were co-authored by Aaron Hoffman and Harry Williams. Written not long after the Wright brothers made their first historic flights, the musical is about three spies from the fictional Port O'Domingo who attempt to steel a flying machine from the United States Military Academy in West Point, New York.

Tom, Dick and Harry opened on Broadway at the American Theatre on September 25, 1905. It ran for just 8 performances at this theatre in a planned limited engagement, and then toured both in and out of New York. It was ultimately performed a total of 41 times on Broadway collectively across short runs at a variety of Broadway playhouses. It starred comedians George L. Bickel (as Tom), Harry Watson Jr. (as Dick), and Ed Lee Wrothe (as Harry). It was a sequel of sorts to the earlier musical Me, Him and I which played on Broadway with the same trio of comedians in the 1904–1905 season.
