= Little Old New York (1940 film) =

- Theatrical release poster
- Directed by: Henry King
- Screenplay by: Harry Tugend
- Story by: John L. Balderston
- Based on: Little Old New York; 1920 play by Rida Johnson Young
- Produced by: Darryl F. Zanuck
- Starring: Alice Faye; Fred MacMurray; Richard Greene
- Cinematography: Leon Shamroy
- Edited by: Barbara McLean
- Music by: Alfred Newman
- Distributed by: 20th Century Fox
- Release date: February 3, 1940
- Running time: 100 minutes
- Country: United States
- Language: English
- Budget: more than $2 million

Little Old New York is a 1940 American black-and-white historical drama from 20th Century Fox, produced by Darryl F. Zanuck, directed by Henry King, that stars Alice Faye, Fred MacMurray, and Richard Greene. The film is based on a play by Rida Johnson Young, which opened on Broadway on September 8, 1920, and starred Genevieve Tobin, Douglas Wood, and Donald Meek. It was previously adapted into a 1923 film starring Marion Davies.

Little Old New York tells the story of the hardships of the engineer Robert Fulton in financing and building the first successful steam-powered ship in America, which would revolutionize river transportation and then ocean commerce around the world.

== Plot ==
Engineer and inventor Robert Fulton (Richard Greene) comes to New York City in 1807, where he meets tavern and inn keeper Pat O'Day (Alice Faye). O'Day comes to strongly believe in Fulton and his dream after he lodges at her establishment. He pursues the investment capital he needs to build his visionary steam-powered ship.

O'Day's longtime suitor, Charles Browne (Fred MacMurray), opens his own shipyard to assist the dapper engineer in building his steamboat after Fulton receives initial financial investment from Chancellor Robert L. Livingstone (Henry Stephenson). Additional funds are raised by O'Day' from her business acquaintances. Fulton eventually acquires the remaining funds needed to complete his revolutionary paddle steamer.

After a shipwright named Regan (Ward Bond) has a run-in with Fulton, Regan attempts to turn every local deck hand and sail-powered passenger boat operator against the engineer, exploiting their fear of losing their livelihoods to a steam-powered vessel. In the end, despite adversity, bad luck, and additional interference from Regan, Fulton is able to complete the steamboat, now named Clermont, at Charles Brown's shipyard. She is successfully launched on her first voyage, silencing the local critics and doubters who had previously labeled the venture "Fulton's Folly".

== Cast ==
- Alice Faye as Pat O'Day
- Fred MacMurray as Charles Browne
- Richard Greene as Robert Fulton
- Brenda Joyce as Harriet Livingstone
- Andy Devine as the Commodore
- Henry Stephenson as Chancellor Robert L. Livingstone
- Fritz Feld as Pearl Street tavern keeper
- Ward Bond as Ragen
- Virginia Brissac as Mrs. Rudolph Brevoort

== Production ==
This is one of Faye's few nonmusical features, and her fans complained about her not singing in the film while it was still in production. A song was later added during an outdoor political rally set in a festive beer garden; Faye's participation in the added song proved minimal.

Both a 12-foot (3.7 m) Clermont shooting miniature and a full-size mock-up were built in Hollywood for the Fox production. Both were based on the original full-sized Clermont replica built for the 1909 Hudson-Fulton Celebration, which was eventually broken up for scrap by its New York owners, a result of financial hardships brought on in the 1930s by the Great Depression.

North River Steamboat is the actual name of the historic steamboat upon which this film is based; the vessel was never known as Clermont in its era.

Little Old New York is a sound remake of a silent film of the same title made in 1923, directed by Sidney Olcott and starring Marion Davies, Stephen Carr, and J. M. Kerrigan.

== Soundtrack ==
- "Who Is the Beau of the Belle of New York", music and lyrics by Mack Gordon; performed by Tyler Brooke, joined by Alice Faye and other dancing patrons of Krausmeyer's Pavilion
- "Ach Du Lieber Augustine", traditional German folksong played as dance music at Krausmeyer's Pavilion
- "Du, du liegst mir im Herzen", traditional German folksong played as dance music at Krausmeyer's Pavilion
