= Ace of Hearts Records =

British record label

- Parent company: Decca Records
- Founded: 1961
- Status: Defunct
- Genre: Jazz, pop
- Country of origin: UK

Ace of Hearts was a British record label founded by Decca Records in 1961, with the aim of reissuing early jazz and popular music on low-priced LPs.

The catalogue included recordings by Bing Crosby, Billie Holiday, Judy Garland, and Ella Fitzgerald. Vocal groups are represented by the Ink Spots and the Mills Brothers, folk and traditional country music by Burl Ives, Uncle Dave Macon and the Carter Family, rock and roll by Bill Haley, Buddy Holly, Brenda Lee and Johnny Burnette, blues by Josh White, Lightnin' Hopkins, Sonny Terry, and Brownie McGhee (and two compilation albums issued under the title Out Came the Blues, and jazz by Louis Armstrong, Eddie Condon, King Oliver, and Art Tatum.

Ace of Clubs Records, a partner label, issued music recorded in Europe.

== See also ==
- Lists of record labels
