= Tuxedo (vaudeville) =

Vaudeville show by Edward Marble

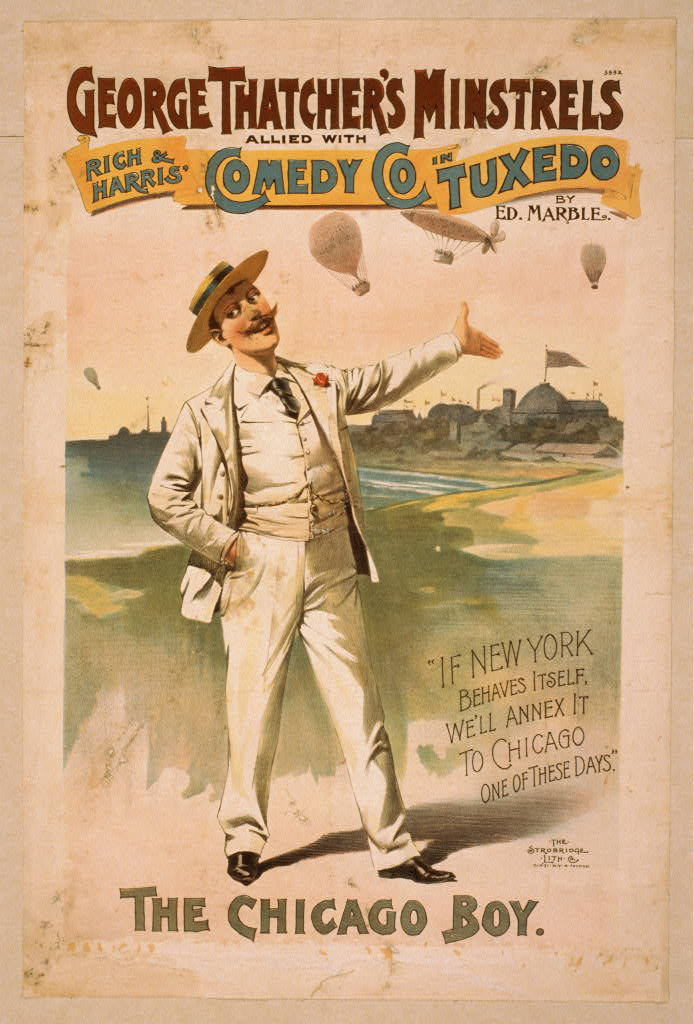
Advertisement

Tuxedo was a vaudeville show with minstrelsy in which the song "Ta-ra-ra Boom-de-ay" was interpolated.

Actor and songwriter Edward Marble wrote and produced Tuxedo for George Thatcher and his minstrel troupe known as Thatcher's Minstrels. The show debuted in Lincoln, Nebraska, on July 23, 1891. It then toured, including to Boston, Massachusetts, beginning on August 24, 1891, and the National Theater in Washington, D.C. Tuxedo arrived in New York at the Park Theatre (at Broadway and 35th Street) on October 5, 1891.

The song "Ta-ra-ra Boom-de-ay" was introduced in this show as an interpolated number.

== Background ==
In describing Tuxedo, The New York Times wrote:

The work, it is said, makes no pretension to anything like a connected plot, but affords opportunity for the introduction of a large number of 'specialties' which are relied on to keep alive the interest of the audience. The action takes place in Tuxedo, and during its progress an English Lord, a typical 'tough,' and a number of pretty girls are introduced. The Thatcher company include Hughey Dougherty, George Lewis, Andrew Powers, James H. Powers, E. M. E. O'Rourke, and W. H. Frillman, and among the females of the cast are Ida Fitzhugh, Agnes Halleck, Irene Murphy, and Mamie Gilroy. A burlesque of Faust and Marguerite is a feature of the last act."

Just a week later, a Times critic wrote:

The combination of minstrelsy and farce at the Park Theatre called Tuxedo has made the hit of the season at that house, which is rapidly becoming established as the chosen home of this light style of entertainment in New-York. George Thatcher and Hughey Dougherty are the two leading people in the entertainment, and to see Hughey in a white face is of itself enough to crowd the house."

The Tuxedo company toured for years, during which many performers joined and left the company. It returned to New York on March 7, 1892, and again on March 21, 1893, this time at the Columbus Theatre.
