= Mamie Gilroy =

American actress and singer (c. 1871–1904)

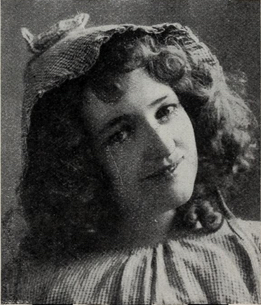
- Mamie Gilroy, from a 1901 publication.
- Born: c. 1871 (some sources give 1878); New York
- Died: August 8, 1904; New York
- Occupations: actress and singer

Mamie Gilroy (c. 1871 – August 8, 1904) was an American actress and singer in musical theatre.

== Early life ==
Gilroy was born in New York, the niece of Thomas F. Gilroy, who was mayor of New York in 1893 and 1894. In some sources she is confused with her cousin, the mayor's daughter Mary Agnes Gilroy Mulqueen (1865–1938).

== Career ==
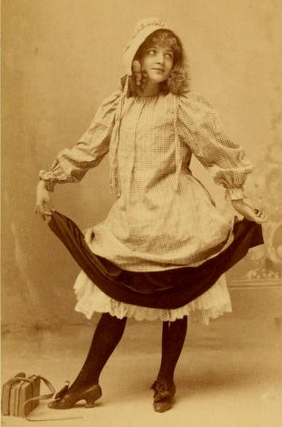
Mamie Gilroy, from a 1908 publication

Gilroy began her career as a small child in stock companies, including those associated with Charles H. Hoyt and Charles Frohman. She had roles in Only a Farmer's Daughter (1885), The Fakir (1890), Romany Rye (1891), Tuxedo (1891–1892), Babes in the Woods (1893), A Milk White Flag (1894), Davy Jones (1894), The China Dog (1895), Little Miss Busybody (1895), The Strange Adventures of Miss Brown (1896), The Merry-Go-Round (1896), Miss Manhattan (1897), Trilby (1898), Mam'selle 'Awkins (1900), Star and Garter (1900), El Capitan (1901), The Giddy Throng (1901), The Girl from Paris (1898, 1902), Lady Bountiful (1902), and George W. Lederer's Mid-Summer Night Fancies (1903). She sang "Everybody Wants to Kiss the Baby" in the musical farce After Office Hours (1901).

The Boston Globe called Gilroy "one of the brightest, most vivacious, and altogether most charming soubrettes on the American stage." Gilroy proposed founding a church especially for theatre professionals in 1898. In 1901, her face, name, and words were used in print advertisements for Dr. Greene's Nervura, a "blood and nerve remedy" marketed to women. In 1902 Gilroy became an honorary member of the Theatrical Mechanics' Association.

== Personal life ==
In 1888 Gilroy was hit by a horse-drawn ambulance on the street in New York; she was described as being 17 years old at the time. In 1894, she was "thrown from an electric" trolley in Boston. In 1898, she announced her engagement to Francis W. McNamara, a public health doctor in Chicago. McNamara, who was already married, said the announcement was a joke. Gilroy died from heart disease in 1904, aged about 33 years (though obituaries gave her age as 26 years), at her home at 130 East 115th Street in New York City.

== The "Mamie Gilroy" cocktail ==
The "Mamie Gilroy" cocktail was named for the actress; it consists of whiskey, ginger ale and lime.
