= Hugh Mendl =

Hugh Rees Christopher Mendl (6 August 1919, London – 7 July 2008) was a British record producer, A&R representative, and manager who worked for Decca Records for over 40 years.

Mendl attended Radley College and then University College, Oxford, where he studied history. After falling in love with jazz music in the late 1930s, he abandoned his career in foreign affairs for sound recording and reproduction. Mendl's grandfather, who was chairman of the Decca Gramophone Company, landed him his first position in the business. During World War II he worked as an announcer for jazz radio in Jerusalem and on news broadcasts in the Mediterranean. He applied for a job at the BBC after the war but soon returned to Decca. He worked as a song plugger in the late 1940s, and began producing in 1950, working early in his career with Reggie Goff (his first recording), Winifred Atwell (producing her classic recording of "Black And White Rag") and Josh White.

Mendl produced Lonnie Donegan's first recordings, which were pivotal in defining the new skiffle sound of the 1950s. His production credits covered a wide variety of styles — he also produced the original cast recordings of musicals such as Hello, Dolly!, Fings Ain't Wot They Used T'Be, Oh! What a Lovely War and Cinderella, a set of speeches by Winston Churchill, comedy/satire albums by Ivor Cutler and Frankie Howerd, and even an LP of the Le Mans 24-hour race, inspired by his lifelong passion for motor racing.

Mendl encouraged Decca to sign rising Liverpool band The Beatles in 1962, but they were famously turned down by executive Dick Rowe. As a result of that historic mistake, Decca executives began paying more attention to Mendl's advice, and he is credited with recommending several other of the company's most important signings, including The Rolling Stones (for which Rowe ultimately took credit), David Bowie, Genesis, John Mayall's Bluesbreakers and Caravan.

In the mid-1960s, Mendl was instrumental in the establishment of Decca's new 'progressive' subsidiary label Deram and he championed Deram's biggest act, The Moody Blues and acted as executive producer for the Moody Blues album Days of Future Passed (1967). Through his efforts, David Bowie, John Mayall, Caravan, and Genesis signed with Decca, although the records of some of these artists appeared on the Deram imprint. He gave the Moody Blues the support that enabled them to evolve from a struggling 'beat-pop' act into a full-fledged progressive rock group, and he offered them a deal to record a lavish orchestral concept album that would promote the company's DSS stereo sound system. In exchange for which Decca wiped the band's debts, which by then amounted to several thousand pounds. Mendl also backed the group's groundbreaking demand for complete artistic control over the resulting album, Days of Future Passed, recorded with the London Festival Orchestra, and for which he acted as executive producer, as well as writing the liner notes.

Mendl was well known for his "massive contempt" for Decca's rival EMI, which he described as having "all of the arrogance of the BBC without any of the education", but his obituary noted that he largely stood apart from the often bitter and divisive office politics at Decca, where staff were habitually played off against each other by Edward Lewis.

Mendl suffered a heart attack at an industry Christmas party in December 1979, which he blamed on the stress of "working for a dying company". During his convalescence Sir Edward Lewis died, and a few weeks later Decca was taken over by Polygram. When Mendl returned to work, he discovered that his office had been cleaned out on the orders of the new proprietors, and all his diaries — which would have provided a unique insight into the company's operations — had been thrown away.

He left the company soon after and quit the music business, retiring to Devon, where he ran an antiques shop.
