= Ace of Clubs Records =

British record label

Ace of Clubs was a record label founded by British Decca in 1959 for reissuing low-priced, classical, early jazz and popular music in Europe. Its partner label, Ace of Hearts Records, issued music from the U.S.

== See also ==
- List of record labels
