= James W. Tate =

English composer and producer (1875–1922)

- Born: 30 July 1875; Wolverhampton, Staffordshire
- Died: 5 February 1922 (aged 46); Stoke-on-Trent, Staffordshire
- Occupations: composer and producer
- Spouse(s): Lottie Collins (m. 1902) Clarice Mayne
- Relatives: Maggie Teyte (sister)

James William Tate (30 July 1875 – 5 February 1922) was an English songwriter, accompanist, composer and producer of revues and pantomimes in the early years of the 20th century.

After working in the United States for five years, he returned to London in 1897, where he became musical director at the Carl Rosa Opera Company and then at Wyndham's Theatre. In 1898 he toured as the conductor for Lottie Collins, whom he married in 1902. After Collins's death in 1910, Tate married Clarice Mayne in 1912; he had been her accompanist since 1906. He composed numerous music hall songs during these years, and had songs interpolated in shows.

Julian Wylie formed a partnership with Tate, creating and producing pantomimes and revues just before the First World War, as well as musicals such as High Jinks (1916). He continued to write the music for popular songs, including several in The Maid of the Mountains and sometimes full scores for shows such as The Beauty Spot (1917). Wylie and Tate continued to produce revues and pantomimes, while Tate continued to write songs. The Wylie-Tate company continued through the 1920s and into the 1930s despite Tate's death, and Wylie continued to use Tate's music in further shows.

== Life and career ==
Tate was born in Wolverhampton, England, the son of a publican. He was the eldest brother of one of the foremost operatic sopranos of the early twentieth century, Maggie Teyte. Originally intending to pursue a career in the church, he received early music training from his father, composing his first piece at the age of ten.

=== Early career ===
In 1892, Tate went to the United States, returning in 1897 to accept a position as musical director at the Carl Rosa Opera Company. Later, Tate served as musical director at Wyndham's Theatre. In 1898 Tate went on tour as conductor with the dancer-singer Lottie Collins, who was famous for introducing the song "Ta-ra-ra Boom-de-ay" to Britain. He married Collins in 1902, becoming her second husband. She was the mother of musical comedy star José Collins. In 1902, he managed a production with a title similar to that of the Parisian hit play Coralie et Cie at the Islington Grand called The Court Dressmaker, or Coralie and Co. This led to legal action in the High Court by the producers of 'The Little French Milliner', an adaptation of the same French play at The Avenue theatre; the dispute was settled by an agreement to alter the title of Tate's play. In 1903 he toured as conductor with the musical All at Sea.

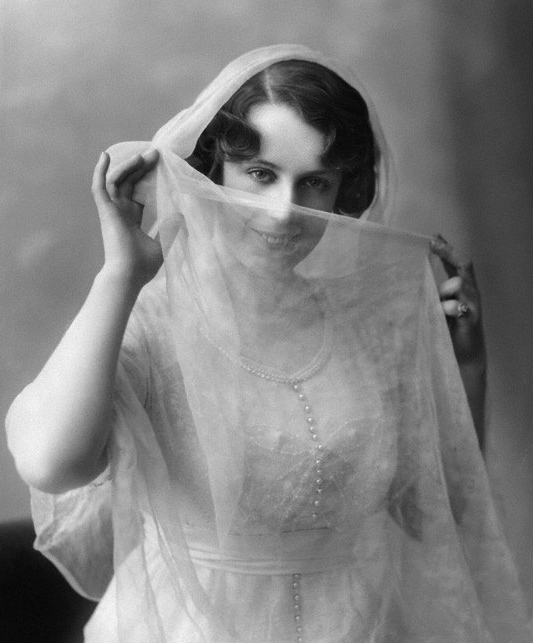
Clarice Mayne, 1911

After Lottie Collins's death in 1910, Tate married singer Clarice Mayne in 1912, with whom he had been performing since 1906. Tate was her accompanist, and was the "That" in the variety theatre act known as "Clarice Mayne and That" ("This sings, That Plays!"). Tate was a composer of numerous catchy music hall songs during these years, many for his wife. He also had songs interpolated in shows, including Sergeant Brue (1904, "Instinct", "And so did Eve") and The Belle of the Orient (1904).

=== World War I years ===
The producer Julian Wylie saw Tate and Mayne's act and formed a partnership with Tate. They began to specialize in creating and producing pantomimes and revues just before the First World War, including I Should Worry at the Palace Theatre (1913), the Victoria Palace's A Year in an Hour (1914), Very Mixed Bathing (1915), Kiss Me, Sergeant (1915), The Passing Show (1915), and High Jinks (1916). Tate co-wrote the successful Samples (1916) with Herman Darewski and Irving Berlin, including the hit song, "A Broken Doll." The Vaudeville Theatre revue Some included his successful song, "Ev'ry little while" (1916). Tate also wrote song hits such as "The rain came pitter patter pown," "A tiny seed," "Come over the Garden Wall," and "I was a good little girl till I met you" (all in 1914), and "Give me a little cosy corner" (1918).

In 1916 Tate composed four songs, including three that became hits ("My life is love", "A bachelor gay am I", and "A paradise for two"), for inclusion in what became a record-breaking show, The Maid of the Mountains. This commission arose at the suggestion of the show's star, Tate's step daughter José Collins, after initial previews indicated that the original score needed strengthening. Lyrics to these songs where supplied by his regular lyricists Frank Clifford Harris and "Valentine" (Archibald Thomas Pechey), who were to write the lyrics of many of Tate's songs throughout his career. "A bachelor gay" became one of the most popular baritone songs in the British concert repertoire. Tate subsequently wrote the score for more revues and pantomimes, including the revusical The Lads of the Village (1917), and another revue-musical, The Beauty Spot (1917), created for Regine Flory and produced by Parisian revue specialist P-L Flers at the Gaiety Theatre, London.

=== Later years ===
1916 publicity piece

Wylie and Tate concentrated on pantomime after World War I, introducing shows such as Any Lady (1918), The Follies of 1919 (which was repeated in each subsequent year) and Mr Manhattan (1919), The Whirl Of Today (1920), Aladdin (1920), and many shows at the London Hippodrome, including The Peep Show (1921), 1921 Swindells Stores, Round In Fifty (1922, with Herman Finck, based on Around the World in 80 Days), Brighter London (1923) and Better Days (1925).

In his last years, Tate continued to produce popular songs, such "Somewhere in France with you," "Give Me a Cosy Little Corner," but he never wrote for another "book" musical. His death cut short a very productive career. The Wylie-Tate company continued through the 1920s and into the 1930s despite Tate's death, and Wylie continued to use Tate's music in pantomimes during this period, including several productions of Cinderella, Leap Year (1924), Mr Tickle M.P (1924), Who's My Father (1924), Turned Up (1926), Flyaway Peter (1926, with Sophie Tucker), The Apache (1927 at The London Palladium), Dancing Mad (1927), The Yellow Mask (1928), Mr. Cinders (1929) at the Adelphi Theatre and The Good Companions at His Majesty’s Theatre (1931).

Tate died in Stoke-on-Trent suddenly at the age of 46, as a result of pneumonia caught while travelling the country with his touring revues. He is buried in Hampstead Cemetery.
