= Georgia Brown (English singer) =

English actress, singer (1933–1992)

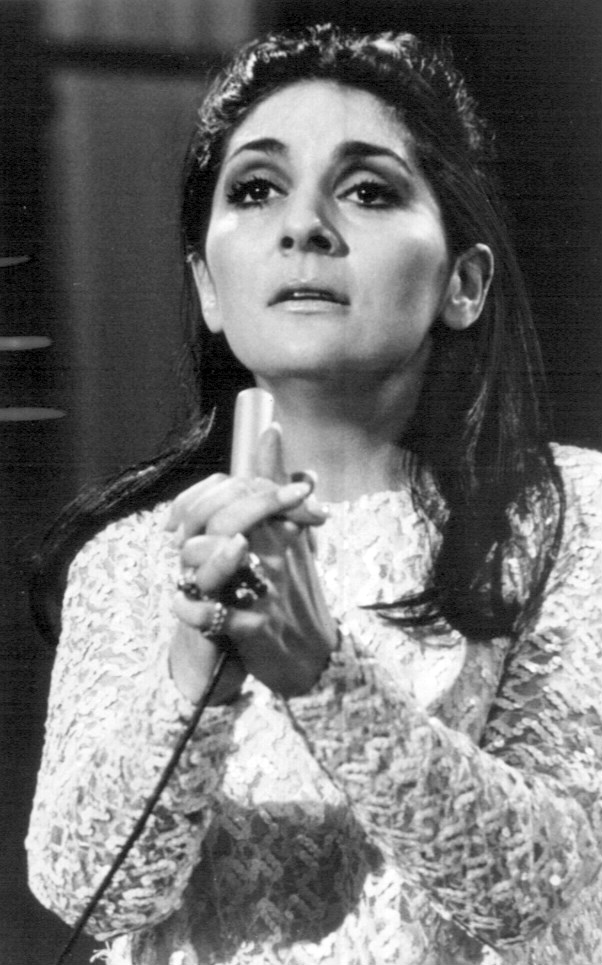
- Performing on CBS Television's Showtime, 1968
- Born: Lilian Claire Klot; 21 October 1933; Whitechapel, London, England
- Died: 5 July 1992 (aged 58); London, England
- Other name: Georgia Brown
- Occupations: Singer, actress
- Years active: 1951–1992
- Spouse: Gareth Wigan (m. 1974; div. 1981)
- Children: 1

Georgia Brown (born Lilian Claire Klot; 21 October 1933 – 5 July 1992) was an English singer and actress.

== Early life ==
Georgia Brown, born Lilian Claire Klot, was born and raised in the East End of London. The daughter of Mark and Annie (née Kirshenbaum) Klot, Brown grew up in a large, extended Jewish family of Russian descent. Her father worked in a textile factory and as a bookmaker. Brown attended the Central Foundation Grammar School. During the London Blitz, she was evacuated to the mining village of Six Bells, Abertillery, Monmouthshire, Wales.

== Career ==
During an initial performing career as a nightclub singer, she adopted the professional name Georgia Brown with reference to two of her favourite repertoire items: "Sweet Georgia Brown" and "Georgia on My Mind". At the age of 17, she appeared at the Embassy Club in London in April 1951 to mixed reviews and she then went into a number of stage presentations at the Empire, Leicester Square for three months. Brown made her first records, “A Friend of Johnny’s” and “Sweet Georgia Brown”, for Decca and they were released in May 1951. She returned to cabaret work at the Washington Club in London in January 1952 before recording thirteen shows for the American Forces Network in West Germany.

Brown was a flatmate of singer Annie Ross with whom she formed part of the vocal quartet known as Lambert, Hendricks, Ross & Brown. Brown then left the quartet, which became the trio Lambert, Hendricks & Ross.

Brown maintained a low profile until she returned to the UK show business scene when she appeared on the BBC-TV show Variety Parade on 5 February 1955. Successful appearances in variety followed and she made another record for Decca, “My Crazy Li'l Mixed Up Heart”. Brown moved on into musical theatre; her breakout role was playing Lucy in the 1956 West End revival of The Threepenny Opera at the Royal Court Theatre, a role she repeated the following year when she joined the cast of the off-Broadway production.

Her breakthrough role was Nancy in Oliver!, a role she created in the original 1960 London production. When she first came in to audition for the musical's author and composer, Lionel Bart, he recognized her as a childhood neighbour, and greeted her as "Lily Klot". Her subsequent audition caused him to award her the role of Nancy. Bart had conceived that role in the hope of having singer Alma Cogan playing it. However, it was reported that after he had cast Brown as Nancy, he then composed the Oliver! numbers "As Long as He Needs Me" and "It's a Fine Life" specifically with her in mind. She created the role of Nancy in the 1963 Broadway production of Oliver!, earning a Tony Award nomination for her performance; her voice is heard on both the original West End and Broadway cast recordings.

On 9 February 1964, she appeared on The Ed Sullivan Show with 18-year-old Davy Jones (pre-Monkees) recreating two scenes from the musical then showing on Broadway. This happened to be the same evening that the Beatles made their first live US appearance on the show. The role of Nancy in the film version went to Brown's friend Shani Wallis.

After a stint in Bart's Maggie May in 1965, Brown concentrated on screen work for more than a decade. She appeared as a singer in A Study in Terror (1965), followed by a number of films, including The Fixer (1968), Lock Up Your Daughters (1969), The Raging Moon (1971, for which she was nominated for a BAFTA Award), Running Scared (1972), Nothing but the Night (1973), Tales That Witness Madness (1973), Galileo (1975), The Seven-Per-Cent Solution (1976) and The Bawdy Adventures of Tom Jones (1976). She also appeared in several television dramas, including the BBC's highly acclaimed The Roads to Freedom, a 1970 adaptation of Jean-Paul Sartre's trilogy for which she sang the theme song "La route est dure".

Brown made a memorable one-off appearance as a Bloomsbury radical in a 1971 episode of Upstairs, Downstairs, portrayed music hall singer Marie Lloyd in the 1972 serial The Edwardians, and took the role of Mrs Peachum in The Rebel, a 1975 biographical drama, one of four about Benjamin Franklin.

Despite her success in such roles, Brown was unhappy with the relative paucity of significant parts for women in television drama. She expressed her dissatisfaction to the BBC and was told to identify a series she would like to be in. Discussions followed between Brown and script editor Midge Mackenzie, and the pair devised the idea for a drama chronicling the struggle for women's suffrage in late 19th- and early 20th-century Britain. Brown enlisted the help of producer Verity Lambert, and the three women got approval from the BBC. In the course of realising the project, Brown and her colleagues found they had to remove a number of misconceptions and inaccuracies from the scripts written by male writers. Brown referred to these as "the male point of view".

Shoulder to Shoulder was first broadcast in six parts in 1974. Brown (and others) sang the theme song for the series, "The March of the Women", and she took the role of working class activist Annie Kenney, alongside Siân Phillips and Angela Down, as Emmeline and Sylvia Pankhurst, respectively.

The episode dealing most closely with Annie Kenney was written by Alan Plater, who had written the 1972 drama about Marie Lloyd (played by Brown) and her involvement in the 1907 music hall artistes' strike, in The Edwardians. Shoulder to Shoulder remains highly regarded as an attempt to convey an important episode both of feminist history and of Britain's history of dissent and civil disobedience.

In 1974, she appeared on BBC TV's The Good Old Days, recreating more music hall performances; in 1961, she had recorded an album of music hall songs, A Little of What You Fancy, with the Ted Heath Band.

Brown returned to Broadway to join the cast of the long-running revue Side by Side by Sondheim in October 1977, replacing Bonnie Schon. In 1979, she created the title role in Alan Jay Lerner and Burton Lane's unsuccessful musical Carmelina, which ran on Broadway for 17 performances.

She toured Britain in Georgia Brown and Friends, then brought the revue to Broadway at the Nederlander Theatre for a limited run from 15 October 1982 to 21 October 1982.

In 1984, she took the lead role of Dorothy Brock in the musical 42nd Street at Theatre Royal, Drury Lane, London. In 1987, the Gilbert Becaud musical Roza, under the direction of Hal Prince, closed after only 12 performances. Her performance of Mrs. Peachum in the 1989 Broadway revival of The Threepenny Opera earned her another Tony Award nomination. Brown can be heard on the charity tribute CD Mack & Mabel in Concert (1988) in which she sings "Time Heals Everything".

In her later years, she limited herself to concerts, cabaret appearances, and guest spots on television series such as Great Performances, Murder, She Wrote and Cheers; she earned an Emmy Award nomination for her role as Carla Tortelli's spiritual adviser Madame Lazora in 1990, and reprised the role in 1991. She made two appearances in Star Trek: The Next Generation ("New Ground" and "Family") portraying Helena Rozhenko, Worf's adoptive mother.

== Record releases ==
=== Singles ===
Brown recorded the single, "Don't Take Your Love from Me" bw "Roll Him Over" that was released in the US on London 45-9513. With "Roll Him Over" touted as the A side, it was noted as a Special Merit Single and was given four stars for both sides in the 20 January 1962 issue of Billboard. It was also reported the same week by Cash Box that the initial reaction to "Roll Him Over" had made Mike Collier excited, jumping for joy and he had embarked on an extensive road trip to promote Brown's single as well as "Midnight in Moscow" by Jan Burgens.

=== Albums ===
In addition to a number of original cast albums, Brown recorded several solo albums, including Georgia Brown Sings Kurt Weill (Decca LK4509, accompaniment directed by Ian Fraser) and Georgia Brown Sings Gershwin. Sings a Little of What You Fancy (1962) is a collection of music hall songs.

== Personal life ==
In 1974, Brown married producer Gareth Wigan, with whom she had been involved for at least seven years; the couple married in order to expedite their immigration with their son Jonathan (then aged six) to the United States. Brown and Wigan separated in 1979, with their divorce becoming final in 1981 after protracted legal wrangling.

== Death ==
Brown died at the age of 58 in London on 5 July 1992. A permanent U.S. resident who lived in California, she had flown to London to appear on the bill for a tribute to Sammy Davis Jr. held that week at the Theatre Royal, Drury Lane.

Before the date of the tribute she became ill and underwent emergency surgery to remove an intestinal obstruction at Charing Cross Hospital, where she died from complications. She was interred at Mount Sinai Memorial Park Cemetery in California.
