= Lottie Collins =

English singer and dancer (1865–1910)

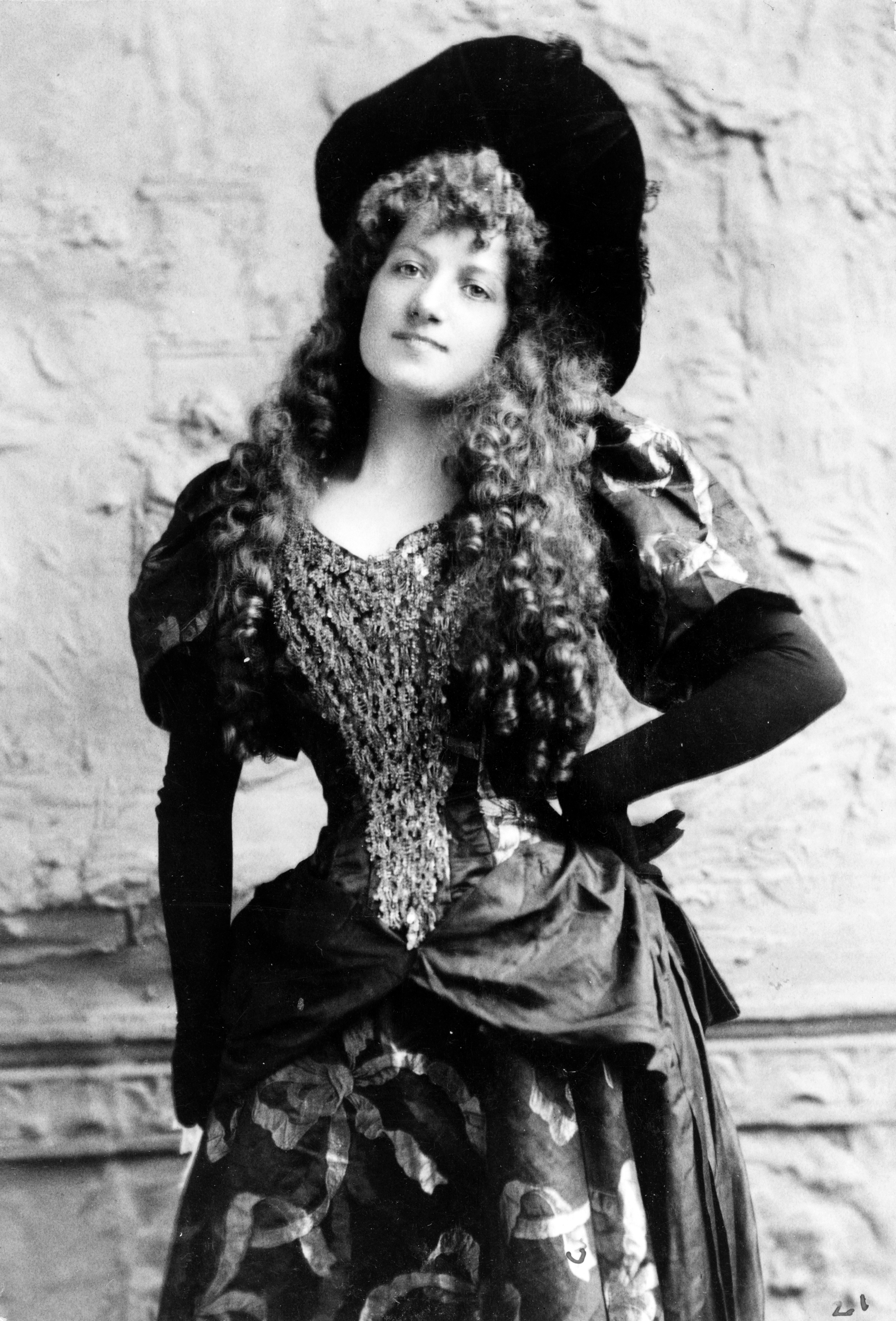
- Born: Charlotte Louisa Collins; 16 August 1865; East End, London
- Died: 1 May 1910 (aged 44); St Pancras, London
- Resting place: Saint Pancras and Islington Cemetery, East Finchley, London
- Occupations: Singer and dancer
- Spouse(s): Stephen Patrick Cooney James W. Tate (m. 1902)
- Children: José Collins (daughter)

Lottie Collins (16 August 1865 – 1 May 1910) was an English singer and dancer, most famous for introducing the song "Ta-ra-ra Boom-de-ay!" in England.

== Early life ==
She was born Charlotte Louisa Collins in the East End of London in 1865. Collins had Jewish ancestry, and her original family name was Kalisch. Her father, William Alfred Collins, was a woodworker and music hall entertainer. José Collins, her daughter (1887–1958), also became famous in musical comedy, and was well known for 1917 play, The Maid of the Mountains. Lottie and her daughter José were relatives of architect Hyman Henry Collins, a well-known London architect. Lottie began her career in music hall at the age of 11 or 12 in 1877 in a skipping rope dance act with her younger sisters, Eliza (Lizzie) and Mary Ann (Marie) as The Three Sisters Collins.

== Career ==
In 1886, Collins became a solo act in music hall. She also played in theatre, appearing the same year as Mariette in the Gaiety Theatre's burlesque, Monte Cristo Jr. She first toured America in 1889 with the Howard Atheneum Company, during which she accepted the proposal of Samuel P. Cooney whom she married in St. Louis. According to her obituary in The New York Times she and Cooney had three children.

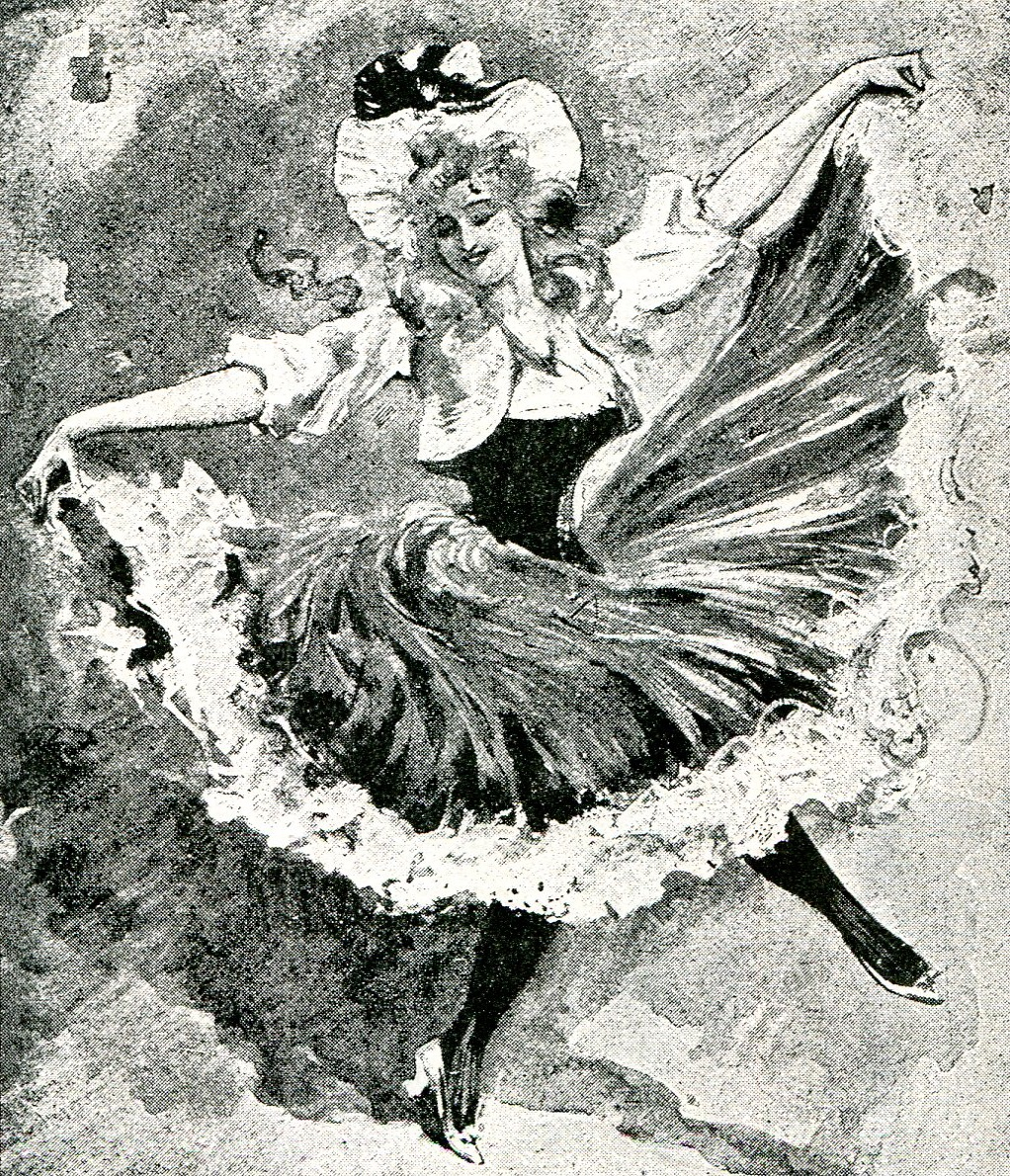
Collins doing her most famous number around 1892

While touring in vaudeville in the United States she heard the song "Ta-ra-ra Boom-de-ay!" After she sang it at the Tivoli Music Hall in London in November 1891, it became her signature piece. She would sing the first verse demurely and then launch into the chorus and an uninhibited and exhausting skirt dance with high kicks (especially on the word "BOOM") that exposed her stockings held up by sparkling garters, and bare thighs. She sang the song at performances of the Gaiety Theatre's burlesque Cinder Ellen up too Late beginning on 14 March 1892 and according to her obituary, at the height of the craze was performing it five times nightly at different venues in London.

She returned to America in September 1892 to perform "Ta-ra-ra-Boom-de-ay" as an entr'acte at the Standard Theatre, New York, but received a bad review from the critic of The New York Times, who described her as 'a mature woman', referred to her as 'Charlotte Collins' and mentioned she had been detained in quarantine when arriving 'on an infected ship'. Another of Collins's dance sketches in the 1890s was The Little Widow, and she also had a hit with the song Daddy Wouldn't Buy Me A Bow-wow. On 29 November 1897 she opened in New York again at the Garden Theatre, part of a triple bill with two short plays. She became an icon of the "Naughty Nineties" and her risqué style led to some criticism, against which she defended herself. A century later, her garters were sold by auction at Sotheby's.

== Family ==
Lottie had three daughters, Lottie Lucia, José and Cleopatra.

- As noted above, José Collins went on to be a musical comedy star. In 1902 she married her second husband, the composer-producer James W. Tate.
- Lottie Lucia (or Lucia Lottie) Collins, a mezzo soprano, appeared in vaudeville on the Australian Tivoli circuit, March–August 1911. She was at the time married to one J. A. R. Cargill; they divorced in 1912. She returned to Australia in 1921 to play "principal boy" pantomime roles. She had undergone a form of marriage with one John Sydney Phillips in London in October 1917, but discovered when she arrived in Sydney that he already had a wife and was penniless.

== Death ==
In 1898, she apparently attempted suicide by cutting her wrists and neck with a penknife, but her wounds were minor and she was discharged from hospital the same day.

She died on 1 May 1910 at St Pancras of heart disease and is buried at St Pancras and Islington Cemetery, East Finchley, London.
