= Little Old New York (1923 film) =

1923 film by Sidney Olcott

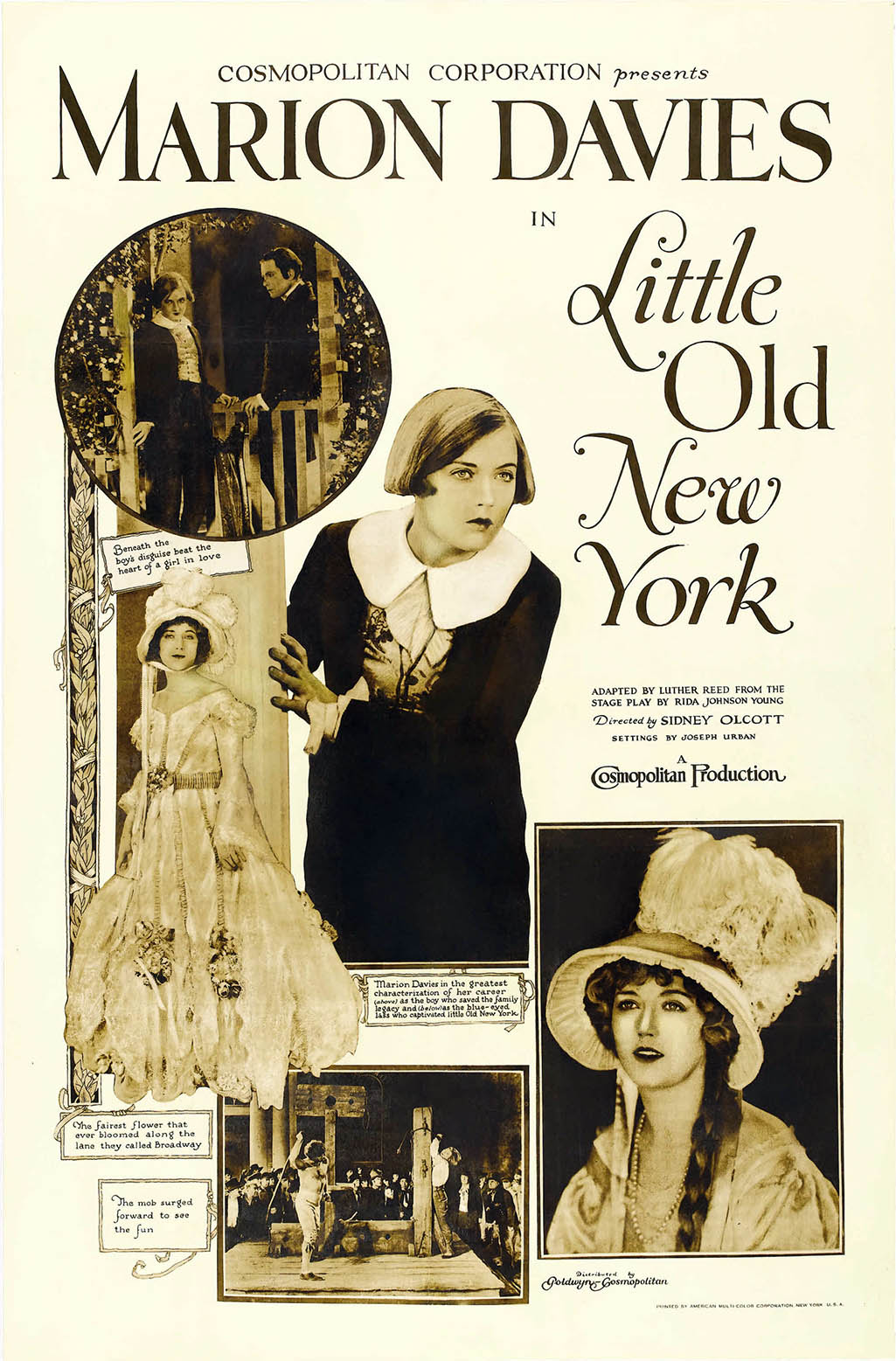
- Film poster
- Directed by: Sidney Olcott
- Written by: Luther Reed
- Based on: Little Old New York; 1920 play by Rida Johnson Young
- Produced by: William Randolph Hearst
- Starring: Marion Davies; Harrison Ford
- Cinematography: Ira H. Morgan; Gilbert Warrenton
- Music by: William Frederick Peters
- Production company: Cosmopolitan Productions
- Distributed by: Goldwyn Pictures
- Release date: August 1, 1923
- Running time: 105 minutes (11 reels)
- Country: United States
- Language: Silent (English intertitles)
- Box office: $1.1 million (rentals)

Little Old New York is a 1923 American silent historical drama film starring Marion Davies and directed by Sidney Olcott that was based on a play of the same name by Rida Johnson Young. The film was produced by William Randolph Hearst's Cosmopolitan production unit.

== Plot ==
Little Old New York (1923)

In 1806 New York City, Richard O'Day leaves $1 million to his nephew Patrick O'Day in his homeland of Ireland. The will gives Patrick one year to claim the fortune or it will pass to Richard's stepson Larry Delavan. Meanwhile, Larry inherits a house and a small allowance. After many months of searching, a solicitor informs the impoverished O'Day family that the sickly Patrick now has only two months to travel to America and claim the fortune. His father John and sister Pat plan for the voyage. Patrick dies during the sea voyage.

When Pat and John arrive at Larry's house, Pat has cut her hair short and poses as her teenage brother. Pat and Larry initially butt heads while she gets accustomed to America and living as a boy. She develops romantic feelings for Larry and becomes jealous when he shows affection for the socialite Ariana du Puyster. The transatlantic crossing weakened the elderly John and he eventually dies. A distraught Pat is comforted by Larry, bringing them closer together.

Larry wants to invest $10,000 in a new steamboat called the Clermont, built by Robert Fulton. However, due to Pat claiming the O’Day inheritance, Larry struggles to raise the money. Pat asks her financial manager, John Jacob Astor, to allow her to invest in the Clermont but he believes it would be foolish. She then lies to Astor, claiming she wants to buy real estate. When Astor gives her access to the money, Pat instead gives Fulton a money order with Astor’s name on it to guarantee the payment of Larry's share in the project. Larry is thankful, but now feels pressured to raise the money within five days.

He decides to place a large bet on a boxing match held in a firehouse, backing Bully Boy Brewster against the Hoboken Terror. Larry puts his house up as collateral, to Pat’s horror. When it appears Brewster will lose, she rings the fire bell and the match abruptly ends as everyone rushes outside. The crowd figures out it was a false alarm and angrily drags Pat to a pillory, where she is tied up and whipped. Desperate to stop the pain, Pat reveals she's a girl. Larry takes her home and the O’Day fortune is now legally his.

Pat is brought to court on charges of fraud. She arrives dressed as a woman and explains Patrick died during the difficult voyage to America. John ordered her to pose as her brother so they could still claim the inheritance, and she did not dare go against her father's wishes. Moved by her story, the court lets her go free.

On the advice of Astor, Pat prepares to leave for London and stay there until the scandal dies down. Larry, having fallen in love with her, proposes marriage. She accepts, and they leave New York together.

== Cast ==
- Marion Davies as Patricia O'Day
- Stephen Carr as Patrick O'Day
- J.M. Kerrigan as John O'Day
- Harrison Ford as Larry Delavan
- Courtenay Foote as Robert Fulton
- Mahlon Hamilton as Washington Irving
- Norval Keedwell as Fitz-Greene Halleck
- George Barraud as Henry Brevoort
- Sam Hardy as Cornelius Vanderbilt
- Andrew Dillon as John Jacob Astor
- Riley Hatch as Philip Schuyler
- Charles Kennedy as Reilly
- Spencer Charters as Bunny
- Harry Watson as Bully Boy Brewster
- Louis Wolheim as The Hoboken Terror
- Marie Burke as Mrs Schuyler
- Gypsy O'Brien as Ariana du Puyster

== Production ==
In her 17th film, Marion Davies stars as Patricia O'Day, who poses as Patrick O'Day. This was Davies' first teaming with silent actor Harrison Ford. This lavish historical drama was filmed in New York City and directed by Sidney Olcott. Hearst had an exact replica of Fulton's Clermont built and staged the famous river race on the Hudson in January. On February 18, 1923, a fire swept through the Cosmopolitan Studio, basically destroying the studio and all its contents. The film's negatives were saved (it was about two-thirds completed), and production began anew at several other local studios. All of the sets and costumes had to be re-created.

The film premiered at the Cosmopolitan, a movie theatre owned by William Randolph Hearst, located at Columbus Circle in New York City.

In her memoirs, Marion Davies recounts this opening: "I didn't look at the picture, because I was looking at that chandelier all the time. It was an enormous thing, and all the audience down below would’ve been killed if it had fallen."

The film was a triumph for Marion Davies, and she was named "Queen of the Screen" and the #1 female box-office star of 1923 at the annual theater owners ball (Rudolph Valentino was named #1 male star).

== Reception ==
The film was the seventh most popular movie that year in the United States and Canada, although Screenland named it the #3 box-office hit of the year.

== Preservation ==
A copy of the film is in the Library of Congress. A copy held by the Irish Film Institute was screened in 2016.

In 2019 Edward Lorusso produced a restored version of the film with a music score by Ben Model.
