= List of This Old House episodes (seasons 11–20) =

This Old House is an American home improvement media brand with television shows, a magazine and a website, ThisOldHouse.com. The brand is headquartered in Stamford, CT. The television series airs on the American television station Public Broadcasting Service (PBS) and follows remodeling projects of houses over a number of weeks.

Season	Episodes	Originally released	
Season	Episodes	First released	Last released
1	13	January 1, 1979	June 30, 1979
2	27	January 1, 1981	September 28, 1981
3	13	January 1, 1982	May 1, 1982
4	26	May 15, 1982	December 7, 1982
5	26	October 1, 1983	March 24, 1984
6	26	October 5, 1984	March 29, 1985
7	26	October 10, 1985	April 3, 1986
8	26	October 16, 1986	April 9, 1987
9	26	September 1, 1987	May 1, 1988
10	26	October 13, 1988	April 6, 1989
11	26	October 12, 1989	April 5, 1990
12	26	September 1, 1990	March 22, 1991
13	26	September 5, 1991	March 19, 1992
14	26	September 1, 1992	May 1, 1993
15	26	September 2, 1993	March 24, 1994
16	26	January 1, 1994	March 22, 1995
17	26	September 3, 1995	March 23, 1996
18	26	September 28, 1996	March 22, 1997
19	26	September 27, 1997	March 21, 1998
20	26	September 26, 1998	March 20, 1999
21	26	September 25, 1999	March 18, 2000
22	26	September 23, 2000	March 17, 2001
23	26	September 22, 2001	March 16, 2002
24	26	October 10, 2002	April 3, 2003
25	26	October 11, 2003	April 1, 2004
26	26	October 9, 2004	April 2, 2005
27	26	October 6, 2005	March 30, 2006
28	26	October 5, 2006	March 29, 2007
29	26	October 4, 2007	March 27, 2008
30	26	October 2, 2008	March 26, 2009
31	26	October 10, 2009	April 3, 2010
32	26	October 7, 2010	March 31, 2011
33	26	October 6, 2011	March 29, 2012
34	26	October 4, 2012	March 28, 2013
35	26	October 5, 2013	May 3, 2014
36	26	October 4, 2014	May 30, 2015
37	26	October 3, 2015	May 28, 2016
38	26	October 1, 2016	June 3, 2017
39	26	October 7, 2017	June 2, 2018
40	26	October 6, 2018	June 27, 2019
41	26	October 5, 2019	May 31, 2020
42	26	October 4, 2020	June 6, 2021

Note: Episodes are listed in the original broadcast order

== Season 11 (1989-1990) ==
- Starting with this season, This Old House introduced their new host Steve Thomas. He was the author of several books, and the host of the PBS series Adventure.

No. in season	Title	Original release date
The Concord Barn
11–01	"The Concord Barn - 1"	October 12, 1989
This Old House kicks off its 11th season with master carpenter Norm Abram, who introduced the new host Steve Thomas. Steve's first project for This Old House was an 1835 barn in Concord, Massachusetts, as he talks to the homeowners, named Lynn and Barbara, who want to dismantle and rebuild the barn and live in it.
11–02	"The Concord Barn - 2"	October 19, 1989
The guys send homeowners Lynn and Barbara to Nantucket, while they visit a bar that has been remodeled into a home, and take a look at a timber-frame house designed by Jock Gifford. In Concord, the farm's old gas tank is removed.
11–03	"The Concord Barn - 3"	October 26, 1989
Timber-frame expert Tedd Benson and the crew dismantle the barn. Homeowners Barbara and Lynn meet with designer Jock Gifford to plan their new home, and visit a nearby carriage house that had been converted to a residence.
11–04	"The Concord Barn - 4"	November 2, 1989
Down the hill from the building site in Concord, well-driller Dave Haynes prepares to fill a well. The guys work on the foundation, and a septic tank is installed.
11–05	"The Concord Barn - 5"	November 9, 1989
We travel to Brattleboro, Vermont to take a look at a factory where stress-skin panels are made. After openings for doors and windows are cut, these panels will be applied to the barn's post-and-beam frame. In his Alstead, New Hampshire, workshop, timber-framer Tedd Benson shows us how traditional post-and-beam buildings are designed using computer-aided-design technology.
11–06	"The Concord Barn - 6"	November 16, 1989
At the Concord site, Tedd Benson and other members of the Timber Framers Guild of North America lead a workshop where students learn how to measure, cut and join timbers for the barn's post-and-beam frame. We then go to Wiscassett, Maine, to visit a sawmill and watch as a tree is transformed into timbers ready for use in the barn's frame.
11–07	"The Concord Barn - 7"	November 23, 1989
The barn's massive frame is put up by hand at an old-fashioned barn-raising, and topped off with a tree for good fortune.
11–08	"The Concord Barn - 8"	November 30, 1989
Stress-skin panels are installed over the barn's finished frame, and work on the well is completed.
11–09	"The Concord Barn - 9"	December 7, 1989
Custom-made windows are installed in the Concord barn, and deluxe sklights are that feature one-step installation bring light into the great space and bedrooms. The crew hangs clapboards that the homeowners have stained on both sides, and landscape architect Tom Wirth discusses landscaping possibilities.
11–10	"The Concord Barn - 10"	December 14, 1989
A concrete slab is poured in the basement. The crew reviews the progress on the barn renovation.
11–11	"The Concord Barn - 11"	December 21, 1989
The well is connected to the house, and Steve Thomas discusses the barn's new plumbing system with Richard Trethewey. Mason Roger Hopkins builds a stone wall on the barn's front exposure.
11–12	"The Concord Barn - 12"	December 28, 1989
Tom Wirth reviews the progress of the landscaping work. Barbara visits a kitchen design center.
11–13	"The Concord Barn - 13"	January 4, 1990
Richard Trethewey explains the barn's new heating system. Dry-walling begins, and an air-exchanger is installed, and landscaping work continues.
11–14	"The Concord Barn - 14"	January 11, 1990
Richard Trethewey takes viewers on a tour of a boiler factory in Battenberg, West Germany, where parts of the barn's high-tech heating system were manufactured.
11–15	"The Concord Barn - 15"	January 18, 1990
A custom stairway is installed in the Concord barn, and we visit Neenah, Wisconsin, to see how the structure was manufactured.
11–16	"The Concord Barn - 16"	January 25, 1990
Steve Thomas takes a side trip to a futuristic show house in Pittsfield, Massachusetts, where plastic is used in novel ways. After Richard Trethewey shows how plastic piping has been laid for the barn's radiant heating system, lightweight concrete is poured on the first floor.
11–17	"The Concord Barn - 17"	February 1, 1990
Terra-cotta tiling begins. The crew cases and frames the doors and windows. We then visit a plant in Western Massachusetts where shingles and other asphalt products are recycled to make paving material that will be used on the driveway of the Concord barn.
11–18	"The Concord Barn - 18"	February 8, 1990
Tiling continues in the guest bathroom, while lighting fixtures are installed along the beams in the great space. At the workshop, the guys build library doors.
11–19	"The Concord Barn - 19"	February 15, 1990
The barn nears completion as wide pine flooring is laid and the kitchen appliances are installed. Richard Trethewey shows us a West German Plumbing fixture factory.
11–20	"The Concord Barn - 20"	February 22, 1990
The project draws to a close as Jean Lemmon, editor-in-chief of Country Home magazine, tours the finished barn.
The Santa Fe House
11–21	"The Santa Fe House - 1"	March 1, 1990
The show travels to Santa Fe, New Mexico, for its newest project: the renovation of a traditional Southwestern adobe home. The homeowners - both artists - shows us around their four-room home. Our host confers with local architect John Midyette and tours a new house in Santa Fe.
11–22	"The Santa Fe House - 2"	March 8, 1990
Sharon Woods, co-author of Santa Fe Style, takes viewers on a tour of some notable local houses. At the site, adobe walls are laid and vigas (roof rafters) are set.
11–23	"The Santa Fe House - 3"	March 15, 1990
Traditional kiva (beehive) fireplaces are constructed. Windows and doors are installed.
11–24	"The Santa Fe House - 4"	March 22, 1990
Richard Trethewey supervises installation of an in-floor radiant heating system, small wall-mounted air conditioners and plumbing fixtures. Master carpenter Norm Abram begins work on his custom-built kitchen cabinets.
11–25	"The Santa Fe House - 5"	March 29, 1990
We visit the Ashfork, Arizona, yard that is supplying the flagstone flooring for the kitchen and library. Back in Santa Fe, the flagstone is laid; saltillo tiling commences; and the kitchen cabinets are installed.
11–26	"The Santa Fe House - 6"	April 5, 1990
Marble countertops are installed in the kitchen, and we visit the marble finishing yard in Juarez, Mexico, where they were made. We get a tour of the finished adobe home, as This Old House wraps up its 11th season.

== Season 12 (1990–91) ==
- Steve Thomas's second season as host.

No. in season	Title	Original release date
The Jamaica Plain House
12–01	"The Jamaica Plain House - 1"	September 1, 1990
The 12th season of This Old House kicks off with the restoration of Hazel Briceno's triple-decker, three-family home in Jamaica Plain, Massachusetts. Together with the Residential Development Program of the Public Facilities Department of Boston, we'll renovate all three floors. First, we soak in the sights and sounds of Jamaica Plain. Then our host heads off to meet with Lisa Chapnick, head of Boston's Public Facilities Department. Finally, the guys introduce homeowner Hazel Briceno and meet contractor Abel Lopes.
12–02	"The Jamaica Plain House - 2"	September 8, 1990
The guys explore lead paint-health hazards, inspection, and removal.
12–03	"The Jamaica Plain House - 3"	September 15, 1990
The issue of vinyl siding is discussed. Cellulose insulation is blown-in from the interior. A variety of replacement windows is reviewed. Kitchen and bathroom redesign begins with Glenn Berger.
12–04	"The Jamaica Plain House - 4"	September 22, 1990
Abel Lopes explains construction of rear porches. Master carpenter Norm Abram shows us how to install the new replacement windows. Vinyl siding goes on, kitchen and bath design plans are unveiled, and our plumbing and heating specialist discusses the homeowner's options.
12–05	"The Jamaica Plain House - 5"	September 29, 1990
Master carpenter Norm Abram works on front porch. We get a lesson from the plastering crew on blueboarding. We then tour a Canadian gypsum mine and New Hampshire factory where gypsum rock is turned into wallboard.
12–06	"The Jamaica Plain House - 6"	October 6, 1990
The guys discuss the basement windows. Landscape architect Tom Wirth makes a preliminary landscaping survey. The guys go over the pre-inspection plumbing. We then tour a factory in Charlotte, North Carolina, where PVC plastic pipe is made. Hazel visits Glenn Berger's showroom to choose kitchen cabinets, counters and flooring.
12–07	"The Jamaica Plain House - 7"	October 13, 1990
Home magazine editor Joe Ruggiero tours the house and discusses with Hazel ideas for interior decorating on a budget. Master carpenter Norm Abram reconstructs the front porch post. Host Steve Thomas gets a lesson on plastering.
12–08	"The Jamaica Plain House - 8"	October 20, 1990
A visit to the Charlotte, North Carolina, chapter of Habitat for Humanity, a national organization that provides affordable housing through no-interest loans, sweat equity and volunteer help. Richard Trethewey explains the water and gas supply and the water heaters back at the triple-decker.
12–09	"The Jamaica Plain House - 9"	October 27, 1990
The guys install the new front porch columns and build a railing system. Abel Lopes and Amy Wrigley tour the house to see progress on the back shed, deleaded window trim and the new tile in bathroom. The guys then discuss baseboard heating and the boilers.
12–10	"The Jamaica Plain House - 10"	November 3, 1990
The crew installs the brackets they've built the workshop. The front door is stained and sealed. Hazel and Tom Wirth visit a nursery for the end-of-month season bargains, and Howard Husock, a housing researcher, takes viewers on a field trip to Worcester, Massachusetts, home of many fine triple-deckers.
12–11	"The Jamaica Plain House - 11"	November 10, 1990
Host Steve Thomas tries some sanblasting to get rid of the graffiti on front of the house. Master carpenter Norm Abram installs some of the trim he made in the workshop. Host Steve Thomas takes viewers to Japan, where he tours a typical apartment and visits a model home park, where shoppers can choose among a variety of prefabricated houses.
12–12	"The Jamaica Plain House - 12"	November 17, 1990
Tom Wirth and Hazel lay out the plants for the front garden and a picket fence is installed. Master carpenter Norm Abram and Abel discuss the upcoming lead reinspection for the stripped trim on the first floor and take a look at the store-bought old-style trim on the second floor.
12–13	"The Jamaica Plain House - 13"	November 24, 1990
We tour the vacant city-owned lot across the street with Stephanie Bothwell, senior landscape architect with the City of Boston. There, trees and bushes are being planted as part of a neighborhood-approved lot improvement scheme. Stephanie and Tom Wirth visit horticulturist Gary Kohler at the Arnold Arboretum to view suitable trees for city landscaping.
12–14	"The Jamaica Plain House - 14"	December 1, 1990
Host Steve Thomas and Amy Wrigley tour two Public Facilities Department houses that will soon be on the market. At the workshop, the guys pre-hang the front door and install its lock system.
12–15	"The Jamaica Plain House - 15"	December 8, 1990
At the house, the guys install the new front door. Hazel's security system is reviewed. Jeff Hosking checks out the state of the house's floors, sanding what he can. Host Steve Thomas then takes viewers to the historic Gardner-Pingree House in Salem, Massachusetts, to see how floorclothes are made.
12–16	"The Jamaica Plain House - 16"	December 15, 1990
Master carpenter Norm Abram tiles Hazel's bathroom with vinyl tile, Richard Trethewey gives us a lesson on installing a kitchen sink and disposal, and we visit a carpet factory in Lyerly, Georgia.
12–17	"The Jamaica Plain House - 17"	December 22, 1990
The guys visit the International Carpetry Apprenticeship Contest in Seattle, Washington. Back in Jamaica Plain, Richard Trethewey and our master carpenter look over some of the newly arrived appliances, and Host Steve Thomas goes across town to check out a modular triple-decker going up on an abandoned lot.
12–18	"The Jamaica Plain House - 18"	December 29, 1990
The final day. Boston's Mayor Ray Flynn drops by to welcome Hazel to the city and gives her a wreath. Designer Joe Ruggiero shows us the three different treatments he gave each floor of the triple-decker, and we see how the stenciling and checkerboarding in the foyer were done. Out at the workshop, the guys build a folding screen for the first-floor dining room.
The New Orleans House
12–19	"The New Orleans House - 1"	February 1, 1991
This Old House heads south to New Orleans. The guys tour the neighborhood of Algiers Point, where Elvis and Jean Golden recently purchased their 98-year-old shotgun double, which they plan to convert to a single-family dwelling. After looking over the house and discussing the Golden's plans, Steve Thomas visits a comparable house and our master carpenter goes over the building's systems with Richard Trethewey. We then take a tour of the Crescent City.
12–20	"The New Orleans House - 2"	February 8, 1991
At the house, demolition of interior walls is completed, and Elvis and the guys begin to frame up new walls and install new supporting beams. We then tour New Orleans with architectural historian Eugene Cizak.
12–21	"The New Orleans House - 3"	February 15, 1991
Steve Thomas visits the Victorian-era Gallier House in the French Quarter, while back in the house drywall begins to go up.
12–22	"The New Orleans House - 4"	February 22, 1991
We visit one of the sites where Mardi Gras floats are built and then head to the house, where a pest control team is taking preventative measures against termite damage. Richard Trethewey tours the city's pumping and water treatment facilities to show how rainwater is gotten rid of and drinking water obtained. Back at the house, the crew sets up staging and removes the troublesome front gutter.
12–23	"The New Orleans House - 5"	March 1, 1991
Steve Thomas and Elvis install one of the back French doors, while Jean gets a lesson in drywall tapping and mudding from a friend. We then tour Oak Valley, a stunning antebellum plantation on the banks of the Mississippi.
12–24	"The New Orleans House - 6"	March 8, 1991
As Jean scrapes the facade, Steve Thomas goes to an architectural salvage yard to search for corncies and gingerbread. Back at the house, Richard Trethewey reviews the state of the plumbing and HVAC systems with the local subcontractors. Jean pays a visit to Gerry Johnson's showroom to begin planning the Goldens' new kitchen.
12–25	"The New Orleans House - 7"	March 15, 1991
We see progress at the house - Elvis scraping facade, Russ Casadonti laying the brick sidewalk, our master carpenter starting to shorten the kitchen window. Color Specialist Louis Albert shows us the facade paints he's chosen and takes us through his house. The project's landscape architect and contractor discuss their plans for the front of the house.
12–26	"The New Orleans House - 8"	March 22, 1991
Designer Teresa Stephen leads a tour of the decorated house. We see how the kitchen cabinets were installed, and how floor specialists brought back the long-leaf yellow pine floors, as This Old House wraps up its 12th season.

== Season 13 (1991–92) ==
- Steve Thomas's third season as the host.

No. in season	Title	Original release date
The Wayland House
13–01	"The Wayland House - 1"	September 5, 1991
The 13th season of This Old House kicks off with a visit to Hazel Biceno's triple-decker in Jamaica Plain, site of the 12th season's main project. We then go to Wayland, Massachusetts, site of this year's house, and meet homeowner Chris Hagger, who gives him a tour. The crew casts a cold, contractor's eye on the 1815 National Historic Register home and tells the Haggers (Chris, wife Joan, and children Andrew and Jason) that they will need to spend a sizable chunk of their $200K budget on basic repairs and upgrades.
13–02	"The Wayland House - 2"	September 12, 1991
Work begins on Kirkside, with Tom Silva and crew beginning to remove the old asphalt shingles. Our host discusses roof ventilation and drip edge with our master carpenter and Tom, then catches up with Greg Clancy, an architectural conservator. With the help of an architectural model, Greg and Chris Hagger discuss the house's history and the issue of ""how far back"" to restore it. Meanwhile, a percolation test has been run to determine where to site the new septic field.
13–03	"The Wayland House - 3"	September 19, 1991
The guys and homeowner Chris Hagger discuss Chris' decision to go with architectural-grade shingles on his new roof. On the roof, the crew installs shingles and a roll-out roof vent. Our host then visits a recycling facility that processes construction debris as well as community recyclables. Back at the house, a preservation mason gives the fireplaces and chimneys the once-over, recommending a careful cleaning for the former and rebuilding for the latter.
13–04	"The Wayland House - 4"	September 26, 1991
The guys begin to dismantle the front portico in preparation for its restoration to its 1888 look. Our host meets George Lewis, chairman of the Wayland Historic District Commission, to discuss the commission's concerns, while up on the roof our general contractor installs a rubber roofing system. Inside, Chris Hagger and designer Jock Gifford discuss ways of improving some preliminary kitchen plans and look at the problems confronting the master suite space.
13–05	"The Wayland House - 5"	October 3, 1991
Mason Lenny Belleveau teaches us the ins and outs of chimney-top flue dampers from and then checks out the work on the chimney sweeps. Down at sill-level, the guys discuss the replacement of one part of the sill and the consolidation of another using an absorbable epoxy. SPNEA head restoration carpenter Tom Decatur demonstrates another version of the epoxy used for filling voids in rotted wood. The crew demolishes the kitchen, and kitchen designer Glenn Berger recaps the evolution of the kitchen Chris and Joan Hagger.
13–06	"The Wayland House - 6"	October 10, 1991
The guys tours the site, looking at the grading and draining work of Herb Brockert. The crew jacks the western facade and replaces rotted sections of the sill. SPNEA's Greg Clancey does some preliminary detective work in his task of determining the building's 1888 color scheme. Richard Trethewey removes the old steam boiler and discusses heating options for the upper floors.
13–07	"The Wayland House - 7"	October 17, 1991
The crew pours footings for the new portico, and the guys tour the demolished bathroom and kitchen, reviewing framing plans. Outside, we meet leader Dave Rugato, whose crew is scraping lead paint off the building. Electrician Paul Kennedy shows us some of his preliminary concerns with the wiring of the new spaces, and landscape architect Tom Wirth walks the property with homeowner Joan Hagger.
13–08	"The Wayland House - 8"	October 24, 1991
Our master carpenter completes the radius frame for the front portico deck, while our general contractor reviews the new engineered wood framing for the kitchen and master bath. Excavator Herb Brockert begins digging the leaching field for the new septic system. Asbestos is removed from pipes in the basement.
13–09	"The Wayland House - 9"	October 31, 1991
Our host checks in again with Herb Brockert, who has installed the leaching pits. Middlesex Lead continues prep work on the exterior, powerwashing for a good painting surface. We visit the SPNEA lab to find out how the 1888 color scheme was discovered. Finally the guys install a new kitchen window, which gives the historic look of true divided light while providing the advantages of modern insulated glass.
13–10	"The Wayland House - 10"	November 7, 1991
Our host shows dry well for perimeter drainage, then catches up with our general contractor, who proposes setting the new entry door into the porch to provide shelter and pre-empt the use of a gutter along that side of the porch. They set in kitchen skylights. A paint technology expert talks about paint prep and choice of paints. At the workshop, our master carpenter turns new mahogany balusters. Back at the house, our host urges Chris and Joan to think about their kitchen lighting before the rough wiring begins.
13–11	"The Wayland House - 11"	November 14, 1991
The guys install a new bulkhead, while Herb Brockert puts in the septic tank, pump chamber and pump. Our host attends the Wayland Historic Commission meeting to watch the debate over Kirkside's proposed repainting. We then visit a paint store to have the historic paint colors computer matched.
13–12	"The Wayland House - 12"	November 21, 1991
Our host reviews rough wiring and plumbing porgies in the kitchen, then checks in with electrician Paul Kennedy for a discussion of work box installation. Our plumbing and heating specialist explains the new zoned heating system, boiler, and hot water heater. New patio doors go in, and we visit a pair of computer modelers who have created a photo-real rendition of the proposed Kirkside kitchen.
13–13	"The Wayland House - 13"	November 28, 1991
Richard Trethewey shows us a gas company truck that runs on natural gas, then takes us inside to see progress on radiant floor heating. Chris Hagger accepts delivery of concrete for a new porch slab from a truck that mixes up small amounts on-site. The crew lays out the slab over the radiant tubing. The guys work with old planes to see how moldings were made long ago, while Tom Silva runs new molding for the eaves with a knife he custom made. Finally, we visit a lighting showroom to see some of the kitchen lighting the homeowners have chosen.
13–14	"The Wayland House - 14"	December 5, 1991
Wallboard arrives by boom truck and our host helps unload it. Electrician Paul Kennedy gives a lesson on how to cut a light switch into an old plaster wall, and we check on progress in the master bath. Outside, landscape architect Tom Wirth shows his master plan to Chris Hagger, while plants go in around the property. Back in the workshop, our master carpenter and host build redwood railings for the new portico.
13–15	"The Wayland House - 15"	December 12, 1991
Tom Silva explains the insulation he has been putting up in the kitchen, and in the master bath. We see a new screw gun the blueboarders are using, and then get a tour of the new air conditioning system. In the basement, Paul Kennedy installs a new generation of breaker boxes. Back at the workshop, our master carpenter builds column support boxes for the portico. Finally, the crew installs the grass entry door in the new back porch.
13–16	"The Wayland House - 16"	December 19, 1991
A licensed crew removes the two basement oil tanks. Mason Roger Hopkins splits granite for the portico foundation, while in the kitchen, designer Glenn Berger begins to install the cabinets. Our master carpenter trims out a new French door in the ballroom, and a wallpaper conservator gives us a rundown on the history and condition of the rare Zuber paper hung in the ballroom.
13–17	"The Wayland House - 17"	December 26, 1991
We meet Sam DeFrost, who points out the features of the new fence. Our master carpenter begins to fit the new portico together, and Roger Hopkins lays in a stone walkway using scrap granite slabs. We take a tour of US Treasury Building rooms that are undergoing historic restoration. Back at Kirkside, Paul Vogan installs the vinyl flooring in the master bathroom.
13–18	"The Wayland House - 18"	January 2, 1992
Richard Trethewey explains ways of preventing pipe freeze-ups. In the kitchen, lighting designer Melissa Guenet and electrician Paul Kennedy shows us the low-voltage and undercabinet lights, then we visit to a fabrication shop where Kirkside's countertops are being made. Back at the house, the guys put a cedar skirt on the new portico, Chris Hagger gives a tour of the house's new security system, and a wallpaper hanger instructs Chris on the papering of the master bedroom.
13–19	"The Wayland House - 19"	January 9, 1992
The final day in Kirkside begins in the steeple of the church, where minister Ken Sawyer gives us a look at the Paul Revere and Son bell. Down at the portico, our master carpenter installs the finishing touch: a curved and kerfed step. Out back, George Lewis and Paul Gardescu of the town's historic district commission give their opinion on the final product. Inside, Glenn Berger gives a tour of the kitchen, and we take a trip to Ohio to see how the dishwasher was built. Richard Trethewey shows off the master bath, and designer Judy George takes us through the decorated four-season porch, master bedroom and ballroom.
The London House
13–20	"The London House - 01"	February 6, 1992
This Old House travels to London, England for its first overseas project. Our host meets with homeowners Jeremy and Carla Vogler -he is American, she is Australian - while our master carpenter visits their British contractor, David Booth, at one of his job sites. With their realtor, we see two other flats the Volgers considered before buying the raw-space top floor of a circa 1850 townhouse, which they propose to open up and modernize. Our host visits an architect to discuss the planning permission necessary before the mansard roof can be altered or a roof deck put on. Note: Fats Waller's "Louisiana Fairy Tale" does not play, so the London march plays instead.
13–21	"The London House - 02"	February 13, 1992
Contractor David Booth introduces us to a ""rag and bone"" man who collects scrap from building sites with his cart and horse. David explains the elaborate scaffolding job and then takes us up to the flat, where the roof is off and bricklayers are extending the mansard sides. Our master carpenter arrives to give the British crew a lesson on pneumatic nailing, and he and David go off to The Building Centre, a showroom of building supplies and design ideas. At the flat, architect Trevor Clapp and homeowner Carla discuss the evolution of the flat's floor-plan. Finally, our host and homeowner Jeremy tour a kitchen design shop.
13–22	"The London House - 03"	February 20, 1992
The guys start the day with the English crew at breakfast. At the site, they inspect the new beam work with contractor, David Booth. Richard Trethewey goes through the flat and discusses the plans, and then takes viewers to Bath, site of Roman plumbing works around 2,000 years old. Our host catches up with homeowners Carla and Jeremy, who have just received news that they are over budget.
13–23	"The London House - 04"	February 27, 1992
Our host visits the Tower of London and meets a Beefeater and one of the famous ravens. At the flat, site supervisor, Finn Hurley, updates us on framing and roofing progress. We then visit master thatcher Christopher White and get a lesson in this ancient roofing art. Our master carpenter visits a woodworking shop where the Volgers' new stairs will be made. Back at the flat, David Booth arrives with news that the local planning authority has said work must stop on the mansard extension so that they can review the proposed plan. A planning consultant adds his comments, and the homeowners are given the news.
13–24	"The London House - 05"	March 5, 1992
Made-in-the-U.S.A. windows arrive by air freight on the site, where the council planner has given the Volgers three design options for making their front facade acceptable. David and the guys look at plastering in the master bedroom and dry rot treatment in the stairwell. Then they take a trip to the country, where our master carpenter looks for some old columns at an antiques warehouse and our host tours an ancient mansion. Back at the flat, the guys look at new plasterboard nail guns and a convertible table saw, and Carla explain Jeremy's decision to move the steel structure back.
13–25	"The London House - 06"	March 12, 1992
The show starts at an ancient stone circle on the Salisbury Plain, then we check progress on the site. Richard Trethewey explains the shower, pump and heating systems and introduces plumber Stan Newton. On the roof, David shows the single membrane weatherproofing system. Our master carpenter points out the features of the American custom windows, and then takes viewers to the workshop where the flat's kitchen furniture is being made.
13–26	"The London House - 07"	March 19, 1992
Our master carpenter shows us the details of the new staircase leading up to the flat. Carla goes through the lighting plan for the entire flat. David Booth reviews the front wall and discusses the kitchen installation. Tiler Terry Hallow works in the master bathroom, while the guys inspect the hardwood flooring and trim and stainless steel hardware. We then visit the Thames Barrier. New steel beams are fitted in the front wall, and only a few feet away, Jeremy looks at the recently installed kitchen. Design consultant Peter Leonard walks through the flat with Carla, as This Old House wraps up its 13th season.

== Season 14 (1992-93) ==
- Steve Thomas's fourth season as the host. NOTE: Exact airdates uncertain, but this season ran from Fall 1992 through Spring 1993, with one major topic of later episodes being the aftermath of Hurricane Andrew.

No. in season	Title	Original release date
The Lexington Ranch
14–01	"The Lexington Ranch - 1"	1992
This Old House kicks off its 14th season by revisiting the Haggers at Kirkside in Wayland. The lawn has come in, and the place looks great. Then it's off to Newton, where a developer has found it economically sound to buy up tired little ranches and upgrade them radically - the idea the show will explore this season. In Lexington, Steve meets Brian and Jan Igoe, and their children Brennan and Sarah, in the ranch house they've lived in for the past nine years. They want to expand it, and Norm, Rich Trethewey, and Tom Silva agree that the basic structure is sound and can be added onto without the need for repair first. Steve and Norm tell the Igoes they'll help them on their project.
14–02	"The Lexington Ranch - 2"	1992
Host Steve Thomas meets famous architect Graham Gund in his offices at Bulfinch Square, a historic complex he restored. After a tour of the offices, Graham takes Steve to look at a house he designed in the Massachusetts countryside. He agrees to take on the redesigning of the Igoes' ranch. Meanwhile, Norm investigates a new style of insulated concrete foundation forms. At the ranch architect Rick Bechtel, Graham's assistant, discusses the Igoes' wish list with them.
14–03	"The Lexington Ranch - 3"	1992
Architect Graham Gund reveals his plans for the Igoes' ranch, using a model and drawings. Tommy and Norm begin to file for a building permit and to figure material and labor costs using a computer program. Meanwhile, Steve takes viewers back to London to see Jeremy and Carla Vogler in their now-complete flat.
14–04	"The Lexington Ranch - 4"	1992
Steve catches up with homeowners Jan and Brian Igoe, urging them to vacate the premises before the demolition begins. The guys discuss the strategy of laying down fiberboard to protect the house's oak floors during construction. Tom Silva tracks down Richard Trethewey to find out how he plans to heat the new addition. We meet foundation contractor Ken Lewis hard at work digging the front bump-out's footing and learn about the Dig Safe program. (Ken hits an unmarked water pipe.) Then we take a look at the foundation hole for the new addition. A concrete cutter puts a doorway through the old foundation wall to connect with the new cellar. Graham Gund and Rick Bechtel discuss continuing design changes to the new addition.
14–05	"The Lexington Ranch - 5"	1992
Arborist Matt Foti and crew remove a large swamp maple from the site. Tom Silva takes us to see another, simpler ranch expansion he did in a nearby town. Back at the site, Norm and Steve discuss the new polystyrene insulating foundation forms Ken Lewis is installing; then the concrete is pumped over the house and into the completed forms. Later, Steve checks in to see the slab poured and termiticide applied to the new foundation's perimeter.
14–06	"The Lexington Ranch - 6"	1992
Lumber arrives on the site, and mason Lenny Belleveau applies a hard cement coating to the above-grade portion of the Styrofoam foundation forms. Architect Graham Gund leads a tour of Church Court, an adaptive reuse project where a burnt-out church was transformed into a condominium.
14–07	"The Lexington Ranch - 7"	1992
With the roof demolished, the crew begins to deck over the second floor. The addition is decked over, and Norm and architect Rick Bechtel discuss plans for the new front entrance. Steve talks with homeowner Brian Igoe about his new chimney, and then tours a ranch renovation in a nearby town.
14–08	"The Lexington Ranch - 8"	1992
With framing well underway, homeowner Jan Igoe gives our host a tour of the developing spaces inside the house. He then talks to framing specialist Gil Straujups, who has been hired to speed the job along. Richard Trethewey supervises the removal of the house's underground oil tank. In the new mudroom, Norm shows how he is attaching closet sills to the concrete floor. Then architect Rick Bechtel takes on a tour of a nearby housing development where the homes are historically inspired.
14–09	"The Lexington Ranch - 9"	1992
Homeowners Brian and Jan tour the house and see how the kitchen ceiling has been removed. Landscape architect Tom Wirth visits the site and accepts the challenge of reworking the approach to the house's front entrance. Tom Silva shows us some new ventilation chutes he's using, as well as an engineered wood trim. Then we visit timber-framer Tedd Benson at a job site on Squam Lake, New Hampshire, and see Tedd and his crew fabricate scissor trusses for the Igoes' great space.
14–10	"The Lexington Ranch - 10"	1992
The timber trusses are craned into new place in the new addition, with stress-skin panels following to form the new roof. Tom Wirth arrives to show us two alternatives for the new entrance's landscaping, and inside Richard Trethewey demonstrates how the waste pipes were modified to handle the two new bathrooms. The guys examine the architectural shingles that are going on the new roof.
14–11	"The Lexington Ranch - 11"	1992
The crew prepares an opening to accept a new window. Housewrap is discussed, and inside Tom demonstrates how he is trimming out the windows with engineered wood trim. Upstairs, Steve discusses various parts of the library's design with Brian and Jan, and we see how mason Lenny Belleveau built the library's fireplace. We then meets Todd Dumas, who is putting the copper valleys onto the building. Steve shows the ridge vents that are part of the roof venting system, then catches up with electrician Paul Kennedy, who shows the mix of new and old wiring he's facing.
14–12	"The Lexington Ranch - 12"	1992
Steve arrives on site to discover stone mason Roger Hopkins at work on the new landscaping. Landscaping architect Tom Wirth explains the evolution of the winning plan. Inside, homeowner Brian Igoe is painstakingly back-priming all the vertical cedar siding, while the guys struggle to make the mitred corners on the redwood clapboards match up. Steve takes viewers on a tour of the factory where the windows were built. Back at the site, roofer Todd Dumas and his assistant Rusty put a standing-seam copper roof on one of the great room's bays. Inside, the guys discuss a piece of built-in furniture the architect has specified for the great room.
14–13	"The Lexington Ranch - 13"	1992
Work continues on the front landscaping, and Tom Wirth gives us an update on the layout. Inside, Richard Trethewey shows us the plastic tubing that has made rough plumbing proceed quickly. Stone mason Roger Hopkins is proceeding, with granite steps going in and a concrete slab poured at the front entrance. At the workshop, Norm fabricates the columns architect Graham Gund has designed for the front entrance. Then we tour a Gund project outside St. Louis.
14–14	"The Lexington Ranch - 14"	1992
Steve catches up with Graham Gund as the architect discusses design issues with Jan Igoe. Meanwhile, Norm tours the US Forest Service's Forest Products Lab, where wood is tested and evaluated. Back on site, Richard Trethewey guides through the process of installing a whirlpool tub, while Jan continues to insulate the building. Kitchen and bath designer Glenn Berger shows off the layout of the new kitchen.
14–15	"The Lexington Ranch - 15"	1992
The job has suddenly taken a turn for the better, thanks in part to the homeowners' cleanup efforts. The crew installs the double front door, and electrician Paul Kennedy shows us the centralized audio/video/telephone wiring system he's installing. Norm continues his visit to the Forest Products Lab, where he sees recycled wood and paper technology. Back at the site, blueboard is going up in the great room, and landscaper Roger Cook goes to dig up a "pre-owned" tree for the use in the Igoes' front yard.
14–16	"The Lexington Ranch - 16"	1992
After a major snowstorm, we arrive on site to find the granite steps installed and Herb Brockert's grading work in the backyard complete. Norm puts in the columns at the front entrance. Then we check in with Richard Trethewey, who explains the placement of the new oil tank in the garage. Upstairs, the plasters are hard at work, patching a section of the old living room ceiling with drywall compound and applying veneer plaster along a curved section under the new staircase. Tom Silva installs extension jambs in the great room's windows, while in the basement, the man who cut a hole in the foundation returns to try to smooth out the slab. Finally, Glenn Berger gives a tour of the kitchen as the cabinets begin to go in.
14–17	"The Lexington Ranch - 17"	1992
Roger Hopkins puts in the last pieces of the front stairs: flagging made from "scrap" granite. Inside, lighting designer Melissa Guenet gives a tour of the lights going into the new great room and kitchen. Upstairs, a fiberglass repair is done on the damaged whirlpool tub, while radiant heating tube goes in on the floor of the great room. At the workshop, Norm works on the carcass an inlaid panels of the Igoes' new entertainment center. Back at the house, Glenn Berger shows some of the other storage cabinets he's installing around the house; the plasters continue their work in the library; and tiler Joe Ferrante begins tiling the master bath
14–18	"The Lexington Ranch - 18"	1992
We visit an iron fabrication shop to see how the front railings are being put together. Back at the house, a marble counter top is fitted into the kitchen, while manmade counters and a shower stall are fabricated on site. Roger Cook drops by with the pre-owned tree and plants it. Norm trims out a dormer window, and we check out the progress on the tiling. In the great room, Glenn Berger shows us a hutch made from cabinet pieces. In the mudroom, Joe Ferrante installs a heavy-traffic tile made from recycled glass.
14–19	"The Lexington Ranch - 19"	1992
Steve meets up with Jan Igoe to discuss the inadvisability of doing patches in the old floors. In the great room, Jeff Hosking and crew install a floating strip floor system, while our master carpenter continues work on the entertainment center at the workshop. Back at the house, Tom Silva is installing maple stair treads and woodmaker Pike Noykes presents the handcarved "dollop" newel he made in his shop. Upstairs, Glenn Berger talks about his custom cherry bookshelves, and Roger Hopkins fits in the granite hearthstone. In the master bedroom, we see Paul Kennedy install a stereo speaker and check up on Corian progress in the bathroom.
14–20	"The Lexington Ranch - 20"	1992
The home stretch. The guys arrive with the entertainment center, and meet up with architect Rick Bechtel, who is started his own firm. Tom Silva installs prefabricated cherry-veneer panelling in the library, while a mirror and glass shower doors go into the master bath. Sarai Stenquist works on Sarah Igoe's wallpaper, and Don Martini shows Steve the security system.
The Miami House
14–21	"The Miami House - 1"	1993
Steve and Norm go to storm-stricken Miami, Florida, in search of a house to fix up. After seeing one that is too big a job for six short shows, they find a 1917 Mediterranean Revival-style home that was directly in the path of Andrew, surviving structurally intact but with significant water damage. Norm meets contractors Rich Groden and Brian Stamp at two of their job sites. Steve talks to homeowner's son Tony O'Donnell about the family's plans to restore and renovate the building.
14–22	"The Miami House - 2"	1993
With the wet plaster and carpeting removed from the house, some heretofore hidden features of the house are revealed, including a former window and the original fireplace detail. Norm sees the roofing replaced with modified bitumen membrane system, Steve meets with the architect and homeowner's daughter Mary Ellen Frank. He also tours an example of Mediterranean Revival-style architecture with Margot Ammidown of the metro-Dade Historic Preservation Office, while Richard Trethewey checks out the state of the house's plumbing with plumber Eddie Faccaviento.
14–23	"The Miami House - 3"	1993
Steve helps tree cutter Tony Sisto take down a dead tree, with some difficulty, while Norm checks the installation of the house's new air-conditioning system. Contractor Rich Groden explains his plan to make water run off the sun porch roof better, and Norm gets an update on the electricians' progress. Steve meets with a window sales rep, who is ordering up as many standard-size replacement windows as he can get away with in order to avoid far more costly custom units. A concrete beam is repaired in the sun porch, and Steve visits Dr. Bob Sheets at the National Hurricane Center in Coral Gables.
14–24	"The Miami House - 4"	1993
Steve opens the show at "Mt. Trashmore," a collecting point—one of about a dozen in South Dade—for all the debris Hurricane Andrew generated. Back at the house, Norm sees how the plaster walls are being patched and finished, while Steve tours the grounds with landscape architect Kevin Holler, who has devised a long-term master plan for the property. The windows arrive, and contractor Rich Groden explains their features and method of installation. Steve tours the kitchen and hears designer Cecilia Luaces' plans for it. Finally, Steve visits a small Miami factory where cement tiles are being custom-fabricated to replace the broken clay ones currently in the house.
14–25	"The Miami House - 5"	1993
Steve sees progress on the house with general contractor Rick Groden: window patch-in, interior plastering and trim. He then meets the man who is patching the exterior stucco. Norm talks with Brian Stamp about a concrete pour meant to strengthen faulty arches in the porch section, and then visits a home destroyed by Hurricane Andrew - a structural engineer explains why the house failed. Finally, Steve meets kitchen designer Cecilia Luaces, who is supervising the installation of the newly arrived cabinets.
14–26	"The Miami House - 6"	1993
The final three days. The painters are hard at work; Norm replaces a window that was broken during construction and shows us the hi-tech coated plastic membrane inside the panes that makes these windows energy efficient. Upstairs, our host sees that the pine floors have been sanded and refinished. We then watch a screened pool enclosure go up in a matter of hours, and checks out the new garage doors and the landscaping. Inside, tile goes down in the kitchen and around the fireplace. Norm visits a housing development where because most of the homes are below the flood plain, houses must be raised up to meet code. Back at the house, Steve talks to Margaret O'Donnell Blue, the 76-year-old owner of the house, and takes a final tour of the completed kitchen with designer Cecilia Luaces. At the wrap party, Brian Stamp tells about the budget, as This Old House wraps up its 14th season.

== Season 15 (1993–94) ==
- Steve Thomas's fifth season as the host.

No. in season	Title	Original release date
The Belmont House
15–01	"The Belmont House - 1"	September 2, 1993
The 15th season of This Old House kicks off in front of a magnificent example of Victorian architecture, then we visit the Society for the Preservation of New England Antiquities to lean more about the style. Then we arrive at our subject house, Dean and Lauren Gallant's 1907 Shingle-style Victorian. After a spin around the outside, we go in and meet the homeowners, who show us the rest of the house and discuss their plans for it. Richard Trethewey checks out the systems and our master carpenter decides to have the siding checked at a lab to see if it contains asbestos.
15–02	"The Belmont House - 2"	September 9, 1993
The asbestos removal crew begins to strip the house of shingles, under the watchful eye of a state official. As a prelude, our master carpenter visits a lab to confirm that the shingles contain asbestos, while our host meets a doctor who confirms the health dangers of the fiber. Back at the house, the crew sets up pump-jack staging, and the Gallants talk about the estimate ($91,000) versus what they can afford ($80,000).
15–03	"The Belmont House - 3"	September 16, 1993
Our host visits a landfill engineered to accept hazardous waste, such as the asbestos off the side of the Gallants' house. Back at the house, Richard Trethewey helps Dean fix a leaky sink in the upstairs library, in preparation for setting up a temporary kitchen in the space while the old kitchen is demolished and rebuilt. Our master carpenter gives Dean and Lauren some help in removing the cabinets from the old kitchen, and they continue the job by pulling down plaster, lathe and blown-in insulation.
15–04	"The Belmont House - 4"	September 23, 1993
The guys meet Dean as he's removing damaged wood shingles, which have been revealed now that the asbestos siding is off. Earlier, our master carpenter and general contractor surveyed the building, assessing which shingles would need replacement, and gave Dean a lesson with a shingle ripper tool. The crew begins to patch in with new shingles, and Lauren describes her plans for the new kitchen so far. Finally, Dean begins to remove the old chimney, using an aerial lift to access it.
15–05	"The Belmont House - 5"	September 30, 1993
While the guys use a new airgun and lightweight nylon hose to shingle the base of one of the turrets, Dean reviews some options for rehabbing and improving the energy performance of the building's windows. We then visit a house where a company is installing insulated glass in old sashes, preserving the historic look of the house while modernizing its windows.
15–06	"The Belmont House - 6"	October 7, 1993
Dean tries out various ways of removing paint from the window castings - heat gun, heat plane, and chemical strippers. Upstairs, our master carpenter replaces the old window band moldings with new stock. Lauren and kitchen designer Phil Mossgraber use a model to take a walk through the proposed new kitchen. Then our host revisits last season's main project, the Graham Gund-designed redo of Jan and Brian Igoe's ranch.
15–07	"The Belmont House - 7"	October 14, 1993
Our host arrives to find the crew getting ready to frame up the gutted kitchen. First, though, the plumbing stack had to be moved; Richard Trethewey shows what's involved in such a project. Tom Silva explains how past work has compromised the framing system, and how he plans to insert a carrying beam and jack up the floor. Outside, homeowners Dean and Lauren strip the last bit of paint an oval window frame using a caustic paste. Dean shows our host newly discovered rot on the porch walls, and the two discuss the idea of putting wood shingles on the front slope of the roof. Dean visits a jobsite to see the details of shingling over an eyebrow window. The window crew begins refitting the old windows with insulating glass, and our host helps the crew put in the engineered lumber beam in the kitchen.
15–08	"The Belmont House - 8"	October 21, 1993
Our master carpenter rides a horse into the Washakie Wilderness in northwestern Wyoming, where US Forest Service carpenters are repairing, with hand tools only, a National Historic Register log cabin.
15–09	"The Belmont House - 9"	October 28, 1993
Our host visits an eight-color historically accurate paint job west of Boston, under the supervision of SPNEA's Andrea Gilmore. Andrea comes to the Belmont house to advise homeowner Lauren Gallant about the paint colors she's considering. The guys critique the trim details on the porch, which has been poorly repaired and patched over the years. Using inference and a turn-of-the-century architectural pattern book, they make an educated guess at to what the original look must have been. Richard Trethewey helps plumber Maura Russell work on the PVC piping in the new laundry room, then he and our host meet up with plumber Christine Ernst in the basement.
15–10	"The Belmont House - 10"	November 4, 1993
Our master carpenter gives us a tip on hiding nails when shingling, while our general contractor builds a cedar and fir deck for the new back entry. Out on the front porch, our master carpenter begins replacing the old, "wrong" square columns with new round ones, choosing between polymer/fiberglass/marble columns and traditional wood ones. Going with the wooden ones, he primes them with alkyd, coats the interior with a tripolymer sealant and uses vented, polyurethane caps and bases. Then we take a trip to the Jimmy Carter Habitat for Humanity Work Project in Winnipeg, Canada.
15–11	"The Belmont House - 11"	November 11, 1993
In a big day at the jobsite, arborist Matt Foti and his crew cut down four conifers that had been hiding the house and keeping it damp. In the kitchen, the crew installs new true-divided-light windows, while on the roof, Jim Normandin is beginning to lay on the new wood shingles. Finally, in preparation for the paint job, painter Lou DiSanto and crew powerwash the building.
15–12	"The Belmont House - 12"	November 18, 1993
Our host Russell, who is completing the rough wiring in the kitchen. Lighting designer Melissa Guenet reveals her plan for lighting the kitchen and new bedroom, while outside, Larry Torti and his crew lay down an old-style macadam driveway. Up on the roof, our master carpenter and roofer Jim Normandin carefully shingle over the eyebrow window.
15–13	"The Belmont House - 13"	November 25, 1993
We arrive to see the new paint colors going up, while Tom Silva continues to re-detail the porch trim with proper fascia and wood gutters. Meanwhile, our master carpenter visits the island of Martha's Vineyard to see the oldest carousel and a full-blown historic restoration of an 1891 Queen Anne. Back at the house, kitchen designer Phil Mossgraber and homeowner Lauren Gallant shows us their choices for kitchen countertops, cabinets and flooring. Finally, arborist Matt Foti gives the oak a fall feeding.
15–14	"The Belmont House - 14"	December 2, 1993
Our host meets landscape contractor Roger Cook as he and his crew install a plastic drywell in the cramped space next to the garage. Homeowner Dean Gallant insulates beneath the kitchen floor, using breathable poly-wrapped insulation, which is easier to handle than the unwrapped product. In the kitchen, the crew has insulated both the exterior walls and some interior partitions (for sound transmission reduction) and put up a tough, cross-laminated vapor barrier that won't rip during the rough and tumble of drywall installation. At the rear of the kitchen, our master carpenter puts in the new back door. We meet historic interiors expert Susan Hollis, who is advising Lauren Gallant as to the proper Arts and Crafts-style wallpapers and lighting fixtures to use. Finally, our host visits the stained-glass workshop of Peter Mattison and Charles Billings, who are repairing the damaged windows from the Gallants' house.
15–15	"The Belmont House - 15"	December 9, 1993
Our host arrives to find the crew putting down rubber membrane roof on the garage, while homeowner Dean Gallant helps Roger Cook lay a concrete block terrace outside the back door. Meanwhile, artisans Peter Mattison and Charles Billings installed the leaded glass windows they've repaired. We then travel to the Mark Twain House in Hartford, Connecticut, a perfectly restored Victorian. Back at the site, homeowner Lauren Gallant is hard at work cleaning up the dust left from tearing down her sand-finish ceilings, which have been redone to a glass-like smoothness by the wallboard/plaster crew. Our host meets them in the kitchen, where they've used a fiberglass backer board around the perimeter for the tile backsplashes. He sees the device they use to lift drywall panels up to the ceiling, and watches as the brown base and veneer top plaster coats go down.
15–16	"The Belmont House - 16"	December 16, 1993
Our master carpenter checks out the new retractable awnings, while our host meets storm window installers who are protecting the leaded glass with custom units. Inside the house, Sarai Stenquist and her assistant Bruce Vivia put up a complex ceiling of wallpaper, and we take a tour of the California studio where the paper is made.
15–17	"The Belmont House - 17"	December 23, 1993
Our host arrives to find the crew fishing off the last of the porch's historic details, which it was able to duplicate thanks to a home movie provided by a previous owner. Charlie installs a new downspout with an improved fastening device. Inside, Tom Silva and master carpenter have hung the new kitchen cabinets, Jeff Hoskings has restored kitchen and living space floors, and tilers. Joe and Chuck Ferrante are beginning the countertops, using a new tile backer board homemade Arts-and-Crafts style tiles. Finally, we watch as an authentic linoleum floor goes down in the mudroom.
15–18	"The Belmont House - 18"	December 30, 1993
The final days. Our host arrives to find Don Franklin of DeAngelis Iron Work installing a new railing on the front stairs, while inside lighting designer Melissa Guenet shows him her completed work in the new powder room and kitchen. Our master carpenter checks out the new garage door with dual safety reversal features. Plumber Maura Marshall and Richard Trethewey go over the new bath china, kitchen sinks and recycled radiators. The next day, Lauren shows off the new Arts-and-Crafts style lighting fixture hanging in the arcade, and we take a tour of the Shingle-style house where the craftsman who made it works and lives. Back in the arcade, historic interiors expert Susan Hollis and carpet merchant John Burroughs unroll a period carpet that provides the final touch to the room. In the kitchen, designer Phil Mossgraber gives us a final tour, pointing out appliances and finishes. Next stop: Hawaii
The Honolulu House
15–19	"The Honolulu House - 1"	February 3, 1994
This Old House travels to Honolulu, Hawaii for an eight-part series on the renovation and expansion of homeowner Christiane Bintliff's Oceanside bungalow, built in the 1930s. The house sits on part of a larger parcel given to her great-great-great-grandfather by Hawaii's King Kamehameha III in return for his services as admiral of the royal navy. Despite the apparent termite damage and out-of-date systems, Chtistiane is determine to save this old-style island home. So our master carpenter goes off to the lonely island of Molokai to see the restoration of Father Damien's church, recently completed by the firm of Ching Construction, and our host visits a stunning renovation of an Oceanside home by architect Norm Lacayo. With the team assembled, the job site is blessed by Hawaiian minister the Reverend Abraham Akaka.
15–20	"The Honolulu House - 2"	February 10, 1994
The guys start the workday by climbing Diamond Head for a view over the city of Honolulu. At the jobsite, our host meets contract supervisor Roland Lagareta to discuss the permitting process and demolition. Our master carpenter meets site supervisor Rob Varnet to see progress on replacing termite-ravaged beams and joists, catches up with the electrician, sees the pouring of pier foundations, and meets roofer Jim Wilkinson, whose crew is starting the removal of the house's four layers of old roofing. Homeowner Christiane Bintliff gives us an update on her plans for the house. We visit Waimea on the island of Kauai, where a man named Mike Faye has a collection of old plantation houses restored to original condition and used as vacation rentals. We go to architect Norm Lacayo's downtown Honolulu office to see a model of the house, with improved floor plan and addition.
15–21	"The Honolulu House - 3"	February 17, 1994
The show opens at the Punchbowl, an extinct volcano crater that is the site of the National Memorial Cemetery of the Pacific, burial place of Americans who have fallen in World War II, Korea and Vietnam. On site, the new addition begins to take shape, with stud walls up and prefabricated trusses arriving on site. All lumber is pressure-treated to battle the resident termites. Homeowner Christiane Bintliff decides to go with a wood shingle roof, as the original house had, and our host talks to roofer Jim Wilkinson about the reasons behind the high - $21,000 - labor cost involved. We visit the USS Arizona Memorial at Pearl Harbor and learn of the events that brought the US into World War II. Back on the job, engineer John Allison and project super Rob Varner discuss options to tie the roof down to the sidewalls to protect against the lifting effect on high winds. Inside, our master carpenter shows us the unique way the original building is put together, and then builds a new single-wall interior partition to match the others.
15–22	"The Honolulu House - 4"	February 24, 1994
The show opens at Hanauma Bay, a sea-filled crater whose marine life attracts thousands of visitors a day, creating a conservation dilemma. At the site, project superintendent Rob Varner gives us a tour of the framed-up addition and rebuilt kitchen area. Up on the roof, our master carpenter sees the hurricane tie-down system connecting the roof to the sidewalls, and roofer Jim Wilkinson and crew install copper valleys, treated red cedar shingles with a 30-year warrantee, and a three-dimensional nylon mesh underlayment that allows the shingles to "breathe" and dry more evenly. Inside, electrician Pierre Jaffuel shows us how he's using underfloor junction boxes to cope with the original building's single-wall construction, which leaves no room for buying wires. Project architect Dan Morgan and window manufacturer Sue Marvin discuss the specifications of the new windows, made to match the originals, but with weather and termite-beating features. Then, to begin an inquiry into the high cost of construction - and living - in the islands, our host boards an incoming container ship. More than 80% of consumer goods are shipped to Hawaii. The inquiry continues at a local home center, where the guys compare prices to those on the mainland.
15–23	"The Honolulu House - 5"	March 3, 1994
The show begins at the Royal Hawaiian Hotel, a 1927 beauty known as the Pink Palace, one of the first two luxury hotels on the beach ar Waikiki. At the site, our master carpenter explains how the addition's siding will be made to look like the original's board and batten, then catches up with job super Rob Varner to see how the lanai is being reinforced with a welded steel frame. Inside, the kitchen wall is opened to give Christiane the ocean view she's wanted. We visit Lolani Place, home to Hawaii's last king and queen, and the United States' only royal palace. Built in 1882, its painstaking restoration is one of the country's finest. Back at the site, "invisible" audio speakers are built into the ceiling, and project architect Dan Moran shows us recessed halogen lights for the "art wall," prairie-style exterior light fixtures, and brass entry hardware with a moleculary bonded finish that the manufacturer warranties as tarnish-free for life. The show ends with a Hawaiian beach picnic, complete with Spam (Hawaiians consume more per-capita than any other US state).
15–24	"The Honolulu House - 6"	March 10, 1994
The show opens at Aloha Tower, built in 1921 and now part of a redevelopment effort by the same group that built Baltimore's Harborplace and Fanueil Hall in Boston. At the site, our host sees ground treatment for termites, our master carpenter trims out the vestibule with poplar, using a coping saw. Downtown, we visit a woodworkers' co-op where Christiane's built-in entertainment center is being built out of native koa wood, with a rack-and-pinion TV lifter. The security system for the house is reviewed, and our host visits architect Norm Lacayo's latest commercial project, Harbor Court, a mixed-use skyscraper on Honolulu's waterfront.
15–25	"The Honolulu House - 7"	March 17, 1994
Our host opens the show at Halekii heiau, an ancient Hawaiian temple on the island of Maui. Surrounded by an industrial park and tract housing, it is an example of the tension between the development and historic preservation. At the site, we check out what's left on project supervisor Rob Varner's punch list, and tour the house. Our host visits a termite fumigation job where the entire house is tented and poisonous gas injected. Richard Trethewey reviews the new solar hot-water system and shows us the split-system air-conditioning units. We then visit a house in Maui designed in 1936 by the dean of Hawaiian architecture, Charles W. Dickey.
15–26	"The Honolulu House - 8"	March 24, 1994
The final days in Hawaii. Our host starts the show in Kalapana on the Big Island, where a 1992 lava flow from Kilauea volcano obliterated much of the town and its famous black sand beach. At the house, landscaper John Mitchell and crew install plants, to be watered by an in-ground irrigation system. Inside, Rob Varner shows off the new sisal-like wool carpet in the addition, as well as track lighting and fans in the studio. Decorative painter Angela Adams works on tropical motif in the powder room, and the guys see the imu (pit) where the luau's pig will be cooked on the final day. The next day, Christiane gives our host a tour of her new kitchen, and he continues into the master suite. In the living room, our master carpenter oversees the installation of the room divider/TV box. Finally, the luau, with thanks to all who made the project a success, as This Old House wraps up its 15th season.

== Season 16 (1994–95) ==
- Steve Thomas's sixth season as the host.

No. in season	Title	Original release date
The Acton House
16–01	"The Acton House - 1"	January 1, 1994
The 16th season of This Old House kicks off with a tour of the country's oldest wood-frame house: the Fairbanks House in Dedham, Massachusetts, built in 1636. We then go to the season's project house (and the oldest house the show has worked on): a 1710 colonial in Acton, Massachusetts, owned by Terry and Sima Maitland. Though suffering from bad sills and much settling, its real problem for this family of five is lack of space. The Maitlands' $150,000 budget will barely cover an addition, and our master carpenter and Tom Silva advise them to ""let sleeping dogs lie,"" and not attempt to correct many of the original house's problems, which would soak up that amount and more.
16–02	"The Acton House - 2"	January 15, 1994
The day begins with the crew moving the old milk shed to another spot on the property. Inside, Richard Trethewey has done an energy audit and determined that, with the addition of a stand-by hot water tank, the current heating plant is sufficient to handle the needs of the new addition. Architect Chris Dallmus reviews with the Maitlands the many design ideas they mulled before deciding on the addition's final layout. The need for the addition results from the lack of usable space in the original house. To illustrate the space-eating effect of the large central chimney, our host visits Minuteman National Historical Park and tours a ""naked"" chimney stack with historical architect Larry Sorli.
16–03	"The Acton House - 3"	January 28, 1994
Homeowner Terry Maitland cuts down a tree to make way for the new foundation, while the crew lays out the excavation lines using a small laser level. Excavation contractor Herb Brockert arrives to dig, while out back the old septic field is expanded with a new tank and new leach lines. Inside, the guys review the demolition plans, pointing out the importance of not going beyond the planned areas of reconstruction. Architect Chris Dallmus guides us through a model of the new addition and discusses a possible window choice. Halfway through the excavation, Herb hits large boulders or ledge at about four feet, dashing the Maitlands hopes for a full basement.
16–04	"The Acton House - 4"	TBA
We tour the newly demolished back areas of the house, and see how woefully underframed they are. In preparation for the new foundation, the crew suspends the gable end of the old house with "pins" of engineered lumber supported both inside and outside the building. Herb Brockert removes part of the old rubblestone foundation, and a small-batch concrete delivery truck pours footings for the addition's lally columns. Steve revisits the Gallants' Victorian to see how they're liking it. A few days later, a performed concrete foundation system arrives on site and is swung into place with a crane. Soon, a transit truck arrives and the crawlspace gets a slab as part of the foundation system.
16–05	"The Acton House - 5"	TBA
At the site, lumber - conventional and engineered - has arrived, and the crew begins to attach the sill to the foundation. Terry Maitland lays down fiberboard to protect his old floors during construction, and discusses with our host his concern about the lead content of the old building: one of his children, who has been monitored for the past year, had a slightly elevated blood lead level. Our host promises the show's help. He then takes Terry into the basement, points out how little is holding up the living room, and suggests Terry replace the lally column that somehow got knocked down. We visit a c. 1760 tavern that has been moved across the state and rebuilt as a private home, with painstaking attention to historical accuracy. Back at the site, the first of the wood I-beam joists go in.
16–06	"The Acton House - 6"	TBA
The framing crew continues working on the addition; a large steel beam to carry out the upper floor is lowered into place. A framer demonstrates a pneumatic tool for attaching metal hangers to wood. The guys lay down the second floor deck, using construction adhesive and tongue and groove plywood. Inside, we find Terry Maitland putting in a footing for the missing basement lally column. We then meet a lead paint inspector, who uses an x-ray machine to gauge the presence and concentration of lead paint in the old building. Tom Silva works on replacing the rotten and underframed back of the old building. We meet a lightning protection inspector from Underwriters Labs, who assesses the building's system.
16–07	"The Acton House - 7"	TBA
With the additional weatherweight, its massing is apparent and seems to make a successful match with the old building. Inside, Tom Silva shows us the lightweight steel partition walls he's building, and Sima Maitland checks out the new windows and first floor plan. We then tour a plant in Tennessee where power tools - including the circular saw he follows from start to finish - are made. Back at the site, Tom Silva shows us how to the exterior trim on one of the new windows.
16–08	"The Acton House - 8"	TBA
Redwood clapboards - finger-jointed and preprimed - start to go on the addition; our general contractor shows us a trick with a "story pole," which helps him space the clapboards evenly across a given field. Our master carpenter explains the challenges of waterproofing and venting the shallow pitch of the addition's shed roof, while in the master suite, we see Dickie Silva screwing down the floor deck with an automatic-feed screw gun. After a tour of the master bath and new second-floor common areas, homeowner Terry Maitland and the lead abatement contractor discuss how the old house's woodwork will be treated during the upcoming deleading process. Our master carpenter warns Terry that the trick will be removing the old windows carefully so as to minimize damage to the interior plaster and exterior siding. Richard Trethewey investigates an old water well discovered on the property - with a proper pump it could supply irrigation water for the yard. Finally, kitchen and bath designer Glenn Berger discusses cabinet choices with Sima Maitland.
16–09	"The Acton House - 9"	TBA
As he contemplates installing replacement windows in the original building, our master carpenter explains that it might make sense to replace the old, heavily weathered clapboards on the fornt facade instead of having to cut each window's trim into them. On the less-weathered west side of the house, the guys shows us just what's involved in installing a replacement window and retaining the original clapboards. We watch the deleading crew in action as they remove lead paint from the original building. Richard Trethewey follows the installation of the well pump and tank, and visits a lab to have the water tested.
16–10	"The Acton House - 10"	TBA
Tom Silva shows us his reroofing progress - stripping of old shingles, plywooding sheathing, new shingles, ridge vent. Down at ground level, the old clapboards have been stripped off the front facade, revealing the reason for the bellying out of the lower left side. Associated interior demolition reveals wide feathered paneling behind the living room's plaster. The structural deficiency is solved by rebuilding part of the wall. In search of ideas for exterior paint colors, we visit historic Deerfield, Massachusetts, a town of remarkably preserved 18th and 19th century homes. Back at the site, landscape contractor Roger Cook installs a gravel path using steel edging and rice stone.
16–11	"The Acton House - 11"	TBA
Homeowners Terry and Sima Maitland puzzle over exterior paint colors, settling on a pumpkin for the field and cream for the trim. They discuss a few details of the farmer's porch that may be reconsidered: a post up against the body of the main house, trim treatment along fascia, and a gutter. Inside, our host checks out a new central vacuum system, while the guys review the heating and cooling systems for the new addition: radiant baseboard downstairs and in the master bedroom, in-wall radiant tubing for mudroom, stairwell, and master bath. Preservation mason Steve Roy diagnoses the fireplaces on the first floor and decides that the chimney should be rebuilt from the roofline up. Finally, landscape contractor Roger Cook supervises hydroseeding of the lawn.
16–12	"The Acton House - 12"	TBA
Tom Silva tests out the old-fashioned v-shaped gutter he made for the front porch, then takes us on a tour of the house, explaining his preparations for the spray-in insulation. Most of these are like for any other insulation job, like his use of vent chutes to keep the roof cool, though he did have to cover the windows to protect them from overspray and put up one side of the interior walls for those rooms he wants insulated for sound. Paul Kennedy explains the challenges he faced in working with the house's steel studs. Our master carpenter follows the spray-in urethane insulation process - from mixing the two-part formula on a truck to spraying it into stud bays, where the liquid expands to 100 times its volume, to cutting away the excess to allow for the drywall. The system not only insulates, but acts as a vapor barrier and air sealant as well. Outside, painter George Hourihan reveals some tricks of the trade.
16–13	"The Acton House - 13"	TBA
We see Terry busily caulking the battered clapboards of the west gable in preparation for the top coat of paint. Painter George Hourihan applies the gloss latex top coat to body and trim. We join mason Lenny Belleveau to take down and rebuild the chimney from the roofline up. Our master carpenter meets up with architect Chris Dallmus for a research trip around Action to find the proper design for a new front entrance, since the old one is now too rustic for the house. Sima Maitland reviews her choices for flooring: recycled longleaf and shortleaf southern yellow pine and old white pine. She decides on the white pine, and we visit the lumberyard where it and a wide variety of other 18th and 19th century architectural components are on display.
16–14	"The Acton House - 14"	TBA
At in-ground propane tank is installed for cooking and drying. Inside, the wallboard is up, plaster is going on the ceiling, and Tom Silva demonstrates a new vacuum sander for finishing off the taped seams on the drywall. Richard Trethewey installs a flexible stainless oil-burner flue liner in the chimney, which will prevent flue gases from considering and damaging the mortar and bricks. our master carpenter uses a new jig to drill out holes for the rear exterior door's lock set. Sima visits a tile store to pick out a slate tile, and the Ferrante brothers use a diamond wet saw to cut it before installing it in the mudroom, laundry room and half bath.
16–15	"The Acton House - 15"	TBA
We arrive to find Jeff Hosking installing the salvaged floorboards he found in a New Hampshire yard. Jeff discusses the challenges of working with such material, and shows a stationary double-drum sander he uses to take off a little of the boards' rough surface at a time. Upstairs, Joe Ferrante applies a colored grout to the slate tile in the master bath. In the dining room, homeowner Terry Maitland - after checking out a similar house nearby - decides to take down the plaster ceiling, in the hopes that an original beam and joist floor system lurks beneath. Unfortunately, what they find is not very pretty... On a more positive front, the guys build a historically accurate entryway for the house back at the workshop. Finally, a new lightning arrest system goes on the building.
16–16	"The Acton House - 16"	TBA
The crew installs the new front entryway. Kitchen designer Glenn Berger leads a tour of the new kitchen, and our host takes viewers to the Bath, Maine, showroom and workshop where it was made, Glenn examines the restaurant-style range and hood. Upstairs, painter George Hourihan paints the master bedroom with combination sprayer and roller, while in the master bath, Richard Trethewey shows us how to install a new toilet.
16–17	"The Acton House - 17"	TBA
Our host arrives to find installer Michael Griffiths laying out a carpet for the master suite. It's made of recycled soda bottles. Inside, he meets up with Tom Silva, who shows him the new ceiling in the dining room (reboarded, plastered, and given a faux box beam) and explains the work involved in finishing off the replacement windows. Homeowner Terry Maitland discusses with them his expenses for the project (around $190,000) and the amount of donated materials (around $120,000) - the target of $150,000 was exceeded because of all the unforeseen work in the old part of the house. Steve meets interior designer Bill Reardon, who explains his approach to the project. Part of it includes a decorative wall finish of joint compound and successive latex paint washes, as applied by artisan Julia Clay. Up in the master suite, the carpet has gone down quickly, and our master carpenter prepares to install brass door hardware. We take a tour of the Reading, Pennsylvania, factory where it was made. Glenn Berger shows us the laundry and the countertops in the kitchen - plastic laminate for the island and work areas, granite for the bake center and on either side on the range. The guys install the stainless steel kitchen sink, review the water and energy-saving features of the new dishwasher, and connect up the ice and water service for the built-in refrigerator.
16–18	"The Acton House - 18"	TBA
The final days. We arrive to find the telephone company burying a new multipair line into the house, leaving the west gable free of overhead wires. Landscape architect Tom Wirth uses a mockup to help Terry Maitland decide where to site the old milk house. Jeff Hosking shows us how he finished the old pine floors to achieve an amber luster. Lighting designer Melissa Guenet gives us a look at the combination of old-fashioned and recessed fixtures, both incandescent and halogen, that she specified for the new spaces. Upstairs, Paul Kennedy installs a paddle fan in the master bedroom's cathedral ceiling, while the crew discusses the remaining problem areas that the Maitlands will someday have to face: sills, drainage, and an unsafe outbuilding. Richard Trethewey takes us on a plumber's final tour through the basement and bathrooms, and interior designer Judy George shows us the decorated rooms.
The Napa Valley House
16–19	"The Napa Valley House - 1"	TBA
This Old House travels to Napa Valley, California, in search of Dennis Duffy's circa 1906 farmhouse. Essentially untouched in the last few decades, the house needs a new, larger and brighter kitchen, as well as a new roof and a reinforced foundation. To help out on the project, our host enlists noted Valley architect Jon Lail, whose residences include a shingle-style home being built on the outskirts of St. Helena. Then we check out the work of general contractor Jim Nolan, whose company renovated and rebuilt the offices, winery, and tasting rooms of Merryvale Vineyards in downtown St. Helena.
16–20	"The Napa Valley House - 2"	TBA
Work begins on the Duffy residence, with Jim Nolan's crew tearing off the back porch with a backhoe. We visit architect Jon Lail's office to see the proposed kitchen addition and are treated to a "virtual reality" walk-through of the space as constructed by computer designer David Munson of HOK Architects, a large firm that employs the technique to present and analyze its large commercial projects. Our host visits Sterling Vineyards, a remarkable architectural statement perched on a mountain at the northern end of the valley. Back at the house, the septic tank has collapsed under the weight of the backhoe, and job foreman Jeff Castille shows us the termite damage and crumbling foundation that further demolition has revealed.
16–21	"The Napa Valley House - 3"	TBA
After a period of heavy rains and flooding, Napa Valley - and the jobsite - are a soggy mess. The show opens in sandbagged downtown Napa, then head to the job, where foreman Jeff Castille and crew have spent the week levelling the kitchen area with steel beams and hydraulic jacks. Jeff shows us the water level he used. Outside, the concrete truck arrives to pump in the mix for the steam walls. On site, our master carpenter visits a rammed-earth house being constructed on a nearby hillside. Our host checks out the condition of Dennis's roof with roofing contractor Mike McDermott, and Richard Trethewey takes Dennis to a San Francisco bath showroom to consider choices for his bathroom and kitchen.
16–22	"The Napa Valley House - 4"	TBA
The show start with a visit to Napa Valley's oldest wooden, gravity-fed winery, home of Trefethen Vineyards. At the site, our master carpenter meets plumber George Biter, who shows his rough work, including ABS and cast iron piping. General contractor Jim Nolan describes how a large laminated-veneer-lumber beam was hoisted into place, spanning the new kitchen and precluding the need for a mid-room support post. New French doors go into the west wall of the old dining room, and our host visits the Palo Alto factory where the energy-efficient plastic film inside the glazing is made. Back on site, we check out the foundation plantings that are threatening Dennis's house, and take a look at Dennis's little vineyard. Then it's off to the other extreme of the winemaking art: Opus One, a joint venture between the valley's Robert Mondavi and France's de Rothschild family.
16–23	"The Napa Valley House - 5"	TBA
We check out the mustard plants in a vineyard near the farmhouse before heading over to a very busy jobsite. There, contractor Jim Nolan shows us the extra work that has had to be done to save us the old front porch; the chimney has also been torn down. The roofing crew strips and sheathes the old roof, which has been straightened and reinforced with purlins and braces. Job foreman Jeff Castille shows us around the newly framed kitchen and we meet electrician Al Curtice, who is installing incandescent can fixtures and a fluorescent valence light around the kitchen ceiling soffit. We tour the champagne caves of Schramsberg Vineyards, while our master carpenter visits a crew who is busy digging a cave for a new winery. On site, Dennis meets with kitchen designer Paul Price to lay out the proposed cabinet footprint and choose cabinet door patterns and finishes, as well as solid surface countertops.
16–24	"The Napa Valley House - 6"	TBA
With remarkable progress at the site, we tour the exterior with Jim Nolan, seeing fir decking, trim details, traditional redwood siding and a synthetic stone facing for the foundation. Meanwhile, our master carpenter visits a nearby factory where wine barrels are made from American oak. Back at the site, our host sees the new semi-custom kitchen cabinets being installed - their features include solid-oak white-stained faces, morticed European hinges, full-extension, dovetailed, solid-wood drawers, and a two-part epoxy finish. The oak floor has been installed - quartersawn 5/16" x 2" strips with a walnut inlay - and we catch up with floor man Ron Spiteri to see how it went down. The next phase of finish work is mouldings and trim, and we see how finish carpenter Jim DePriest handles the casework around a door.
16–25	"The Napa Valley House - 7"	TBA
The show opens at Clos Pegase, a winery designed by noted architect Michael Graves. At the site, the rains continue, and so does progress. Our master carpenter follows the installation of the solid-surface countertop, while Richard Trethewey points out the important features of the new hot-water system: earthquake strapping, a circulating pump on a timer and the magnesium rod which prevents corrosion of the tank. A water softener goes in, and electrician Al Curtice installs a three-way dimmer that dims from two locations. Finally, we tour a remarkable winery property that's for sale in St. Helena.
16–26	"The Napa Valley House - 8"	March 22, 1995
The final day opens at a scenic overlook on the first clear day in a week. On site, the painters are applying the exterior topcoat, carpenters are cutting the last pieces of trim and architect Jon Lail is on-site to check out the final product. Meanwhile, Richard Trethewey shows us the utility room - a small toilet and shower room, a lavatory and a laundry with plenty of storage space. The kitchen has an island sink with water purification unit; a trash compactor; three-bowl sink with disposal; two undercounter thermal-convection ovens; a quiet dishwasher with a pause function (for turning on after people have left the room); a gas cooktop with retractable hood; and a built-in refrigerator that operates for around $85 a year. The push towards more efficient appliances and buildings began in California, and Richard meets with the chairman of the state's energy commission to learn about its programs. We see custom wood doors and brass hardware go in, then visit a stunning private wine cellar. Dennis gets a small undercounter wine storage unit. Our host sees the less-glamorous side of wine country when he meets a local winemaker on his small property. Finally, Dennis and his niece hoist a flag up his new wooden flagpole. The wrap party begins, with thanks to the hard work of contractor Jim Nolan, foreman Jeff Castille and their crew, who conquered once-in-a-century rains to bring the job in on time, as This Old House wraps up its 16th season.

== Season 17 (1995–96) ==
- Steve Thomas's seventh season as the host.

No. in season	Title	Original release date
The Salem House
17–01	"The Salem House - 1"	October 7, 1995
The 17th season of This Old House kicks off with a tour of Salem, Massachusetts - the Witch Trials Memorial, the town's formerly bustling waterfront, the residential grandeur of Chestnut Street, the House of the Seven Gables, the Peabody-Essex Museum and the old town hall. Convinced that this is the town the show should work in, our host tours two houses that are for sale with realtor Betsy Merry. While one is in too fine shape, the other needs a lot of work. It's an estate property on the market for $239,000. We meet a couple who is considering making an offer on it - they have two children and one on the way and only six small rooms in their current house. Meanwhile, our master carpenter and general contractor check out the property. Their conclusion: Many repairs are needed, mostly the result of neglect, but the building is essentially sound.
17–02	"The Salem House - 2"	October 14, 1995
Their bid of $205,000 accepted, the Guinees take possession of the house. Our host meets their banker, who explains some of the financing of the deal. Deborah walks through her wish list for the house: a kitchen, master suite and some way of getting off-street parking. Meanwhile, our master carpenter has begun work on the old window sash in the dining room. He removes the stops, loosens the paint and caulk-encrusted lower sash, removes it and begins the process of taking out the glass. Scraped of loose paint, the broken wood is epoxied back into a strong unit and primed. Museum curator Dean Lahikainen gives us a tour of the Pierce-Nichols house, Salem architect Samuel McIntire's first commission. Built in 1782 and remodeled in the Federal style in 1801, it is one of America's finest late-colonial buildings.
17–03	"The Salem House - 3"	October 21, 1995
We visit the island of Nantucket, where architect Ann Beha's firm is expanding and renovated the historic Atheneum, the town library. She agrees to help out in Salem. In Salem, the crew erects aluminum pump jack staging - a safe and efficient system, especially when many trades will be working on the exterior. We tour a couple of paint jobs with painting contractor Mike McManus and asks him to squeeze our house into his schedule. The guys finish reglazing the old window sash, using old-fashioned mouth-blown restoration glass. In the basement, Richard Trethewey points out an inefficient electric water heater that currently handles both sides of the house, and an oil heater that could use some tuning up. Our master carpenter points out "cooked," degraded old clapboards on the upper third of the building and recommends replacing them.
17–04	"The Salem House - 4"	October 28, 1995
On a hot July day, the crew got the existing children's bath and future master bath. They discover a flooring system that probably can't support the heavy load of two bathrooms' worth of china and tile, and decide to beef it up before starting the rough plumbing. Up on the roof, mason Lenny Belleveau reflashes and repoints the chimneys, replacing a poorly built cricket and sealing it with a rubber membrane. Painting contractor Mike McManus powerwashes the building, and architecture students measure the building to prepare "as-built" drawings for the architects to use. Architect Pamela Hawkes visits the site and considers a suggestion of cutting through the house's rear ell with a porte cochere to gain access to the back yard and solve the parking problem.
17–05	"The Salem House - 5"	November 4, 1995
Tom Silva shows us the reframed bathrooms, with floors stiffened by flipping the original joists and sistering on reinforcing members. The bathtub arrives, and the crew horses it upstairs, where plumber Charles Cashin is rough-plumbing the new children's bath and master bath. Restoration painter John Dee uses dental tools to reveal the finest of the portico's details. Before he could get to that stage, however, he had to painstakingly remove about 20 layers of built-up paint, aided by a paint stripping gel. We see wood restorer John Stahl use an epoxy repair system to work on the historic windows on the first floor. The Dutch system replaces rotted wood with workable epoxy and uses a flexible silicone for glazing compound. Architect Ann Beha presents some possible color schemes to homeowner Deborah Guinee, and later, after painting some samples on the building, she chooses colors (blue body, white trim, black shutters) that she will present for approval to the Salem Historical Commission.
17–06	"The Salem House - 6"	November 11, 1995
The crew insulates the exterior wall of the kids' bath with blown cellulose. Tom Silva shows us a paint-on bathtub protector that peels off after construction is complete. We meet roofer James Shea, who has three options, with prices, for the repair of the slate roof. Since the roof can be seen on the street, the Historical Commission will need to approve one of the options: slate repair, replacement of rear hip with fiberglass shingles or replacement with artificial slate. Then we're off to Frankfurt, Germany to visit ISH, the world's largest plumbing and heating exposition. Back in the bath, the crew puts up drywall, using a quick-setting joint compound.
17–07	"The Salem House - 7"	November 18, 1995
We arrive to find Mike McManus and his painting crew continuing their prep work, dry scraping and hand sanding, per Board of Health regulations. The new staging now has safety nets, protecting passersby from falling tools or debris. Inside, our master carpenter shows us how to lay out and install tile in the kids' bath, using both a stationary and a hand-held wet saw. We revisit the Maitlands' colonial farmhouse in Action, to see how they're liking it. Back at the house, homeowner Deborah Guinee shows us the drawings of the covered carriageway the architects have put together; she'll have to take them in front of the Historical Commission to see if they will approve the scheme.
17–08	"The Salem House - 8"	November 25, 1995
The crew assesses the condition of the clapboards on the back of the building, patching presents a large investment of labor, while total replacement will be a big materials hit. Our host promises to take the issue up with the homeowners. Meanwhile, painter Mike McManus and crew apply the first coat of tinted primer - and they like the way the new paint goes on. We then attend the Salem Historical District Commission meeting, where architect Pamela Hawkes presents the carriageway drawings, commissioners ask questions, neighbors voice opinions and the commission votes to approve the concept, asking for more details of the floor. The guys grout the new bathtub wall. The tile floor is in, but before it went down they had to install a premade underfloor tubing system for heat and a cementitous underlayment. Outside, restoration painter John Dee is putting the final coat of paint on the portico. In preparation, he used a wood filler known as Swedish putty to smooth out the surfaces to a nearly mirror-like finish.
17–09	"The Salem House - 9"	December 2, 1995
We arrive to hear some troubling news: Some of the neighbors - not pleased with the Historical Commission's approval of the carriageway plan and worried about traffic flow, fumes, and the change to the facade - are thinking of appealing the decision. Upstairs, however, work on the kids' bath proceeds, with the installation of a new vanity, solid-surface counter with bowl, and lighting sconces. Our plumbing and heating specialist puts in a new sink faucet and shows us an electronic valve that shuts down when the clothes washer is off, reducing the chances of leaks. Downstairs, architect Ann Beha walks Deborah Guinee through the proposed new kitchen. After the bathroom mirror is installed, a crew arrives to fabricate and install a wire shelf system for the bathroom closets. Finally, the crew begins demolition for the new kitchen.
17–10	"The Salem House - 10"	December 9, 1995
Our host recounts the latest Historical Commission meeting, in which the original approval of the carriageway was sent aside and the whole issue reconsidered. Because of discrepancies between the drawings and the actual house, the commissioners vote to visit the jobsite, see a mock-up of the carriageway, and vote on its appropriateness at a later meeting. Kevin Guinee expresses his frustration at not knowing whether or not that part of the project can move forward. Around back, the crew is replacing the crumbling wood side with a cement-based clapboard that's 60% the cost of cedar. Up on the roof, our host watches as roofer James Shea pulls out and replaces a broken slate; 100 more to go. He also is replacing the old zinc hip flashing with copper fastened with brass screws. The guys review progress in the rebuilt kitchen shed addition, in which Tom Silva used a keyed system of engineered beams to carry the weight of the exterior wall above over a wide span. They install two skylights in the kitchen. Finally, the Ferrante brothers install a Victorian-style tile in the master bathroom and shower stall. It will match the clawfoot bathtub that is to be reconditioned off-site.
17–11	"The Salem House - 11"	December 16, 1995
The City of Salem's tree-planting program puts in a Callery pear (pyrus calleryana 'red spire') in fornt of the Guinees' house. In the kitchen, the guys examine the new windows - custom-made with sills and casings to match the existing ones on the house. They feature glass recycled from the original kitchen windows, which were too big to accommodate the countertops. The guys recall the scene earlier when Historical Commission members and interested neighbors visited the site to see a mock-up of the proposed carriageway. Roger Hopkins arrives to realign the granite steps, and Tom Silva puts a time capsule underneath, containing a TOH shirt, a Silva Bros. shirt, and a copy of TOH magazine. Upstairs, the crew cuts through a wall to reconnect the guest room to the Federal for the first time in 120 years. Our host takes the old clawfoot tub to a company in Ludlow, Massachusetts, to get it refinished.
17–12	"The Salem House - 12"	December 23, 1995
Lighting designer Josh Feinstein shows Deborah lighting treatments for the kitchen and living room, while electrician Jeff Perry works to fish wires for the spots that will highlight the mantelpiece. Kevin Guinee reviews the progress so far and how much money remains in the Guinees' war chest (answer: only about $30,000 out of an original $110,000). We check the state of the new plumbing with plumber Charlie Cashin, then see the new high-velocity forced hot air heating system for the upper two floors. Finally, the guys remove wide pine boards from the attic for the use in the new master bath.
17–13	"The Salem House - 13"	December 30, 1995
Our host arrives with news from the latest Historical Commission meeting: a decision on the issue of the carriageway will be made in three weeks. The Guinees asked for a continuance because the corrected drawings arrived only a day before the meeting and they wanted everyone, themselves included, to be fully up to speed on the details. Despite the continuance, public comment was heard, and a lot of it was against the carriageway. Out back, our master carpenter begins to build a trash shed that will allow the Guinees to store their cans and recycling bins. The crew uses engineered lumber to stiffen the floor of the boys' bedroom. Our host visits the Andrew-Safford house, an 1819 late-Federal that is part of the Peabody Essex Museum, that been renovated by a local charity as a designer showcase. Back at the house, a slow-expanding insulation foam is injected into the walls, the shed is finished off, and the guys compare the merits of two types of storm windows: one-piece interior and triple-track exterior.
17–14	"The Salem House - 14"	January 6, 1996
Our host arrives to see a wallboard delivery truck in action, while inside the wallboard/plaster crew works in the dining room. Upstairs, the guys address the out-of-square conditions in the guest bedroom by rejiggering the door casings for visual appeal. Our host uses a personal computer program to help Deborah Guinee work on the design of her kitchen-to-be, and he pays a visit to wallpaper expert Richard Nylander at the Harrison Gray Otis house in Boston, home of the Society for the Preservation of New England Antiquities, to get a tour of the Federal home and pick up samples of wallpaper for Deborah to consider in her historic rooms.
17–15	"The Salem House - 15"	January 13, 1996
Homeowner Kevin Guinee tells us that, for now, they have withdrawn their petition to build a carriageway, citing lack of time to build, lack of remaining funds, Deborah's pregnancy and the highly charged atmosphere in town surrounding the issue. The Guinees will finish off the room where the carriageway may someday go as a simple family room. Richard Trethewey arrives with a stainless steel flue liner to prevent condensation from the highly efficient gas furnace from forming in the old chimneys, leaching through and damaging both the mortar and surrounding ceilings and walls. We meet a representative of the regional electric company, who shows us a new, more-efficient water heater being installed on the rental side of the building and explains the company's position on heating water with electricity. The guys fabricate a run of seamless aluminum gutter, and a crew installs a protector that keeps leaves from collecting in the gutter while still allowing water to be collected. We then visit the local shop where Roger Hedstrom and crew are building our kitchen cabinets and carving woodwork to fill out the missing areas in the old McIntire rooms. Back on site, homeowner Deborah Guinee uses small paint samplers from the hardware store to experiment with colors for the interior spaces.
17–16	"The Salem House - 16"	January 20, 1996
We meet artist Don McKillop, who is painting a portrait of the Guinees' house, while across the street a brick sidewalk is installed in front of the house. Inside, floor man Jeff Hosking finishes the rough wide pine flooring in the master bedroom, while painter Mike McManus uses a high-volume, low-pressure sprayer to paint the fine woodwork in the guest bedroom. We take a tour of a replica village that recreates Salem's earliest days as a fishing settlement in 1630. In the backyard, a children's playset goes up to the approval of the Guinee boys. Our host reviews with James Shea the completed roof job - fiberglass shingles on the back slope, repaired slate on the front, new copper flashing throughout - with roofer James Shea, and Charlie Silva puts up a hybrid storm window system: single-pane interior units for the historically sensitive front facade windows; high-quality triple-tracks for the rest of the building. Finally, the guys begin to install the newly painted kitchen cabinets.
17–17	"The Salem House - 17"	January 27, 1996
A historically inspired Federal-style fence is installed to replace the rotting pickets in front of the house. Tom Silva installs a new mortice lock in the front door using an automatic morticing tool. In the kitchen, we meet with Julia Clay, who is painting a diamond pattern on the floor, while in the powder room decorative painter John Parsons is creating a mock library on the walls. We then visit Salem's Peabody Essex Institute for a sampling of its collection, which includes artifacts from the city's maritime past and original records from the witch trials of 1692. Back on the site, our master carpenter installs a new, full-light patio door in the family room to allow more light in, using a new kind of adjustable screw to set the jambs. The crew hauls the newly restored bathtub upstairs to the master bathroom, where it matches beautifully with the new toilet and pedestal sink. Our plumbing and heating specialist has found antique-look chrome bath fixtures that comply with modern code. To make hot water, he has installed a basement gas-fired boiler that fulfills three functions: domestic hot water, hot water to supply heat to the upstair hot-air system and warm water for the underfloor heating tubes in the upstairs bathrooms. Finally, Norman St. Marie and Lynn Parker shows us how to hang the historic reproduction wallpaper in the McIntire living room.
17–18	"The Salem House - 18"	February 3, 1996
The final days. We arrive after a snowstorm to find the front hall floor finished with a faux marble treatment by decorative painter Julie Clay. In the kitchen, Tom Worthen installs a "man-made slate" countertop. It's a dense composite of Portland cement and a mica-like mineral, often used in laboratories, but suitable for domestic applications. Upstairs, Michael Griffiths installs a dense carpet made from recycled soda bottles. In the McIntire room, historical goods merchant John Burrows supervises the installation of a historically accurate carpet, and we visit the factory in England where it was made on a narrow loom whose design has remained much the same since 1790. Then we check out the new alarm system, complete with low-temperature sensor. Josh Feinstein gives our host the tour of the new lighting. The guys examine a pop-up ventilator for the new modular cooktop and we see period-reproduction furnishings in the living room and guest bedroom, where we meets the latest addition to the Guinee family - two-day-old Madeline. At the final party, artist Don McKillop gives Kevin Guinee the completed painting of their old house.
The Savannah House
17–19	"The Savannah House - 1"	February 10, 1996
This Old House travels to Savannah, Georgia, where Mills and Marianne Fleming have purchased an 1884 Italianate Victorian townhouse on Monterey Square, one of the city's most beautiful. We tour the house, whose rotting back porches will be replaced by a permanent structure holding an expanded kitchen and dining room on one floor, and a master bedroom and bathroom on the second. Other needed improvements include restoring the heart pine flooring, adding guest bathrooms, installing HVAC system to cope with the region's high heat and humidity and improving the facade with an appropriate iron balustrade and wooden shutters. Mills leads a "greatest hits" tour of downtown Savannah. Then contractor J.T. Turner, whose firm has restored many homes and buildings in the historic district, shows us a job in progress and a finished restoration. Finally, Turner's job foreman, Mark Fitzpatrick, goes over the subject house and gives us his take on the main challenges facing the project team.
17–20	"The Savannah House - 2"	February 17, 1996
The show begins with the TOH guys antiquing and then heading over to the jobsite on Monterey Square. With demolition of the rear porches complete, the Turner Construction team, led by Mark Fitzpatrick, has moved on to framing, using engineered lumber where possible. Mark tours the project from garden-level apartment to roof. We visit the next door twin of the Flemings' house for clues about its original floors, lighting, mantlepieces and archway between front and rear parlors. Homeowner Mills Fleming and designer Jeff Verheyen review some of the changes - mainly in bathroom placement, number and design - that have occurred since the original blueprints were drawn up. Meanwhile, plumbing contractor Ernest Hutson shows us how to vent an understairs powder-room toilet with an air-admittance valve that precludes the use of a through-the-roof vent. Viewers then tour the architectural and plumbing splendors of the Owens-Thomas House, an outstanding example of the English Regency style built in 1819 by architect William Jay.
17–21	"The Savannah House - 3"	February 24, 1996
The show opens at Wormsloe Plantation, ruins of a 1736 dwelling on the banks of the Inland Passage and the earliest remnant of those colonial times in Savannah. Back at the project house, a new water main is going in on Gordon Street. Inside the new historically accurate (true-divided-light, single-thickness glass) windows have arrived, and project manager Mark Fitzpatrick applies brick-mold trim to one and installs it. The high-velocity air-conditioning ducting and air-handlers are now on site. Viewers then tour the Green-Meldrim house to see its many methods of keeping cool in the days before electricity. Atop the Flemings' house, a new terne metal roof and a fluid-applied acrylic and polyester mesh roof, new and old. A pull-down attic stair is installed, while out back masons reuse local "Savannah Grey" bricks from the original structure to build up a veneer on the new addition.
17–22	"The Savannah House - 4"	March 2, 1996
The show opens at an architectural salvage shop in downtown Savannah; the proprietress drops by the jobsite to buy some of the salvaged plumbing fixtures and woodwork. The strip oak flooring is ripped up to reveal the original heart pine beneath - it's in great shape and can be refinished. A new spray-on cellulose insulation is perfect for the irregular and thin spaces against the exterior masonry walls of the building. The exterior of the new addition is paneled over with medium-density overlay board, ideal for exterior painted surfaces. Finally, Midnight in the Garden of Good and Evil author John Berendt takes us a tour of the Savannah portrayed in his best-selling book.
17–23	"The Savannah House - 5"	March 9, 1996
The show opens at Fort Pulaski, a Federal fort taken over by Confederate forces early in the Civil War, only to fall to superior weaponry, rendering its masonry construction obsolete. At the site, new mouldings, custom milled to match the existing ones in the house, have arrived and are stacked neatly and out of harm's way in the carriage house. Upstairs, job supervisor Mark Fitzpatrick uses a fax service to up-to-date specs for the new appliances so that he can rough in electronics and gas accurately. Upstairs, drywall contractor Kevin Landry is using a vacuumed sander to smooth out his joints. Viewers then check out a new batt insulation made of cotton scraps and meet flooring contractor Mike McMurray, who will lay a new heart pine floor in the addition and make it match the old, which he will also be refinishing. We see paint and wallpaper prep, and a new plaster ceiling medallion made by master plasterer Jean-Francois Furieri. We visit the Lucas Theater restoration project, where Furieri has repaired or recast the entire theater's plasterwork. Finally, we learn about a central ventilation system that services several wet rooms at once, with a vent fan located up in the attic.
17–24	"The Savannah House - 6"	March 16, 1996
The show opens at Congregation Mickve Israel, where Rabbi Belzer takes us on a tour around the 1876 building and shows us the congreation's Torah, the oldest in America, brought over with the original temple members in 1733. At the house, city preservation officer Beth Reiter confers with Mills Fleming about the exterior paint colors and the way they will be applied to the stucco building. Inside, paper hanger Peter Bridgman works on one of the four ceilings he is treating with wallpaper. Before he could proceed, paper hanger Don Taylor had to stabilize the cracking plaster with a system of paper-barrier paint and fiberglass fabric. Finish carpenter Steve Scherz shows us some of the elaborate new moldings going up, including a cornice made up of seven separate elements, design to imitate the building's original plaster cornices. We visit blacksmith Johnny Smith's forge, where he is fabricating a new wrought iron railing for the Flemings' house, while back at the house, tile contractor Dennis Spikes prepares the guest bath wall for tile using a full mud job (concrete backing).
17–25	"The Savannah House - 7"	March 23, 1996
The show opens with a visit to the Port of Savannah, one of the busiest container ports on the East Coast and a major employer for the region. He delivers the new cedar shutters to the jobsite, while the heat pumps are hoisted onto the roof. Installer Jimmy Woods shows us the new maple cabinets going into the kitchen. The building's front facade gets a lift as project manager Mark Fitzpatrick removes the old sheet metal "pigeon guards" that were obscuring the lintels. We visit nearby Gulfstream Aerospace, where state-of-the-art business jets are built and fitted out with cabinetry of the finest veneers. Back at the house, we see a floor mosaic go down in the entrance vestibule; its intricate Greek key and acanthus leaf design is formed of porcelain tile cut by computer-controlled water jet. We check out the new and old heart pine floors, matched perfectly by specialist Mike McMurray and crew. Finally, paper hanger Peter Bridgman continues his work in the rear parlor.
17–26	"The Savannah House - 8"	March 30, 1996
The final days in Savannah. We visit a preservation expert in charge of saving Pulaski Monument in Monterey Square, which is falling victim to the ravages of acid rain, sulfur, and bacteria. At the house, we meet up with homeowner Mills Fleming, who is busy programming his new security system via a touch-tone phone. Blacksimth Johnny Smith is installing the new wrought-iron railing for the house's front stairs. Inside, lighting designer Cyndee Sessoms shows the sand-cast and crystal chandelier lighting fixtures she chose for the house, while in the kitchen, Mills sees the completed cabinetry and stainless-steel appliances. The granite countertops are in, and we visit the local shop where they were fabricated. On the main staircase, we check out brass dust corners, period hardware that keeps dust from collecting in stair's corners. Outside, paint contractor Parker Chapman works to make sure the house will be ready for the final day. The final morning starts with Savannah mayor Floyd Adams presenting the key to the city to the This Old House team. Project manager Mark Fitzpatrick uses an epoxy product to repair the broken masonry of the front steps, while inside the building's heating and cooling system is fired up and we tour the master bath, laundry and guest bath with Marianne Fleming. This Old House wraps up its 17th season with an old-fashioned oyster roast in Monterey Square.

== Season 18 (1996–97) ==
- Steve Thomas's eighth season as the host.
- Starting with this season, This Old House began syndicating commercially to local stations as This Old House Classics, featuring vintage, classic, and memorable This Old House projects, it was first syndicated by TimeWarner's Telepictures Distribution, and then by Warner Bros. Domestic Television Distribution.

No. in season	Title	Original release date
The Nantucket House
18–01	"The Nantucket House - 1"	September 28, 1996
This Old House kicks off its 18th season by traveling to Nantucket, aboard a Steamship Authority vessel. On island, they tour one of our master carpenter's first jobs, a clothing store. Linking up with designer Jock Gifford, we take a walk up Main Street, one of the finest preserved streets in America. At the subject house, a tour reveals small rooms and poor systems, but a project with a lot of potential. Accordingly, we meet island contractor Bruce Killen and then the homeowners, Craig and Kathy McGraw Bentley.
18–02	"The Nantucket House - 2"	October 5, 1996
The crew starts the work day surf casting with local expert David Goodman (and full-time tile contractor) - and even catch a striped bass and a bluefish. At the house, Jock Gifford and the Bentleys use a model to go over the new design for the new house. Whatever they decide they want to do, all exterior changes will have to be approved by the island's Historic District Commission (HDC). We meet commission head Mark Avery to hear about to hear the group, its mandate, likes, dislikes, and proceedings; meanwhile Jock takes us on a photography expedition around the island as he prepares a presentation to the HDC about exterior changes - dormers, decorative shingling - proposed for the Bentley house. In the basement, Richard Trethewey finds very little plumbing or heating equipment worth saving; he then follows the energy story on Nantucket, from wind power to electricity generation to fuel oil to LP gas to wood. In a word, it's all expensive, so the choices the Bentleys make for their home will have large and long-lasting consequences.
18–03	"The Nantucket House - 3"	October 12, 1996
The show starts with a visit to Nantucket's Unitarian Universalist church, a beautiful showcase of restrained New England architecture and trompe l'oeil painting built in 1809. At 3 Milk Street, we catch up with general contractor Bruce Killen, who has his building permit and is well into a gut job on the building. Reasons for this dramatic course include the fact that the building will need insulation, upgraded wiring and plumbing, new windows and trim, and a notable change of floor plan; it will also get rid of the bulk lead paint. Outside, mason Don Kissell is accepting a load of concrete for the new addition's footings. Our master carpenter takes a trip to an island plant to see where the concrete is mixed. We hear designer Jock Gifford's report on the Historic District Commission's judgement: the additions were approved, but any exterior details will have to be proven to have been on the building originally. To that end, Syd Conway, who grew up in the house, drops by to share some old family photos, one of which reveals a very Victorian entrance, with double doors and bracketed roof; the current Colonial door went on in the 1930s. Sure enough, homeowner Craig Bentley, while cleaning out the crawlspace, finds the double doors, complete with etched glass.
18–04	"The Nantucket House - 4"	October 19, 1996
Our master carpenter goes lobstering with contractor/lobsterman Pierre Garneau, who has a family license to put out 10 traps. At the house, mason Dan Kissell takes down the unneeded (and unsafe) chimneys, careful to salvage the old bricks, which can fetch up to $2.50 a piece. Homeowner Kathy McGraw Bentley is assigned the task of cleaning the bricks of their old mortar. Engineered lumber arrives on site, in time for reframing to begin both inside the building and on the platform left by the recent demolition of the kitchen ell. We learn how to mix the perfect mortar with the masons, who are beginning to build the concrete block foundation for the new addition. Inside, job foreman Patrick Hehir and the crew work to insert a new engineered lumber beam into the second floor system, and begin to sister on 2 x 8s to the existing 2 x 6 joists.
18–05	"The Nantucket House - 5"	October 26, 1996
The show starts with a visit to Sankaty Head Light, a Coast Guard property of the exposed Eastern edge of the island. Built in 1850, it like the rest of the houses along the bluff that leads up to it, is in danger of being washed away by the encroaching Atlantic. Coast Guard Capt. Bill Batson gives us a tour and discusses the options for the future. Back at the house, general contractor Burce Killen checks out the nearly entirely reframed house and discuss the efficiency and code considerations that led to such a radical reworking. Outside, designer Jock Gifford shows homeowner Kathy McGraw Bently a sample of the new windows he's specified for the house, featuring true divided lights, interior energy panels, factory installed trim, and a factory applied three-part exterior paint finish guaranteed for ten years. The Bentleys need to go before the Historic District Commission to obtain approval for the colors they want to use on the building; upon approval they can order the windows. Meanwhile, longtime resident Foley Vaughn leads us to a tour of the village of Sconset on the Eastern side of the island. Starting as a humble fishing outpost, it's become a prime spot of charming cottages and historic homes, though erosion threatens to take parts of it into the sea.
18–06	"The Nantucket House - 6"	November 2, 1996
The show opens with a little clamming, looking for quahogs at a secret location. At the site, we meet designer Jock Gifford, who uses the model of the house to explain the work going on: cutting a hole in the roof to accept the addition's gable. Inside, we meet framing contractor Paul O'Rourke, whose crew makes the cut, assembles the gable wall on the second floor, and pushes it up into place. On the roof, Bruce Killen reviews the progress the new wood shingle roof and the ingredients that go into a roof designed to last 50 years, even in the harsh island environment: heavy roof sheathing, tarpaper, bitumen membrane along edges and in valleys, copper valleys and drip edge, a three-dimensional mesh that allows a layer of air beneath the shingles, and the shingles themselves - #1, vertical-grained, thick-butted (5/8") Western red cedar. Homeowner Craig Bentley considers the possibility of using a ground-source heat pump to both heat and cool the building, a good choice on an island with high fuel costs, since it relies on the ambient heat of the earth. We visit a system in operation in another house of the island. The next day, our master carpenter inspects the completed gable framing, while we see what the old double front doors might look like up against the house. Our master carpenter takes them out to Bruce Killen's woodworking shop in hopes of refurbishing them.
18–07	"The Nantucket House - 7"	November 9, 1996
The show begins at Nantucket's Old North Wharf, much of which dates from the early 18th century and site of several small cottages available for rent. At the site, homeowner Kathy McGrew Bentley shows us the window sash color approved by the Historic District Commission, as well as the outside placement of the chimney, which had previously been slated for inside the building. Contractor Bruce Killen describes the cost of the extra framing work so far: $30,000. Outside, mason Dan Kissell shows us how to parge the new concrete block foundation so that it matches the old foundation, while cedar roofer John Rex reveals the secret of the roof's decorative diamond detail. Out at Bruce Killen's workshop, Bruce helps refurbish the building's old front doors, using custom knives to replicate the moldings and a large belt sander to remove the paint from the frames. Finally, lighting designer Melissa Guenet and electrician Sally Kay Bates shows us the plans for the second floor.
18–08	"The Nantucket House - 8"	November 16, 1996
The show opens at Nantucket's Whaling Museum with curator Mike Jehle. At the site, we see the first of two wells being drilled for the Bentley's ground-source heat pump; they meet an expert in the technology, Carl Orio, who explains how the heat pump works off the ambient temperature in the groundwater. Then we take a tour of some of the island's best open spaces, preserved through the efforts of the Nantucket Land Bank, a public body that competes against developers on the open market using funds it receives from a 2% fee accessed on every real estate transaction on the island. Back at the site, homeowner Kathy McGrew Bentley is hard at work at decisions about her kitchen and floors - our master carpenter reviews wood floor options with her and general contractor Bruce Killen. Our host discusses decisions about the electrical and lighting plans with lighting designer Melissa Guenet and electrician Sally Kay Bates.
18–09	"The Nantucket House - 9"	November 23, 1996
Before heading over to the job site, we visit the 1827 African Meeting House, a former school, church, and meeting house used by Nantucket's black population until the 1920s and now the object of a restoration effort. Contractor Bruce Killen builds a new door frame for the restored Victorian double doors, which he and the crew hang. Then we go to Switzerland to see one man's solution to the high cost of building and real estate there: high-quality factory-built houses.
18–10	"The Nantucket House - 10"	November 30, 1996
A visit to Nantucket's Life-Saving Museum teaches viewers about a key part of the island's maritime past. Meanwhile, the site is a flurry of subcontractor activity. Mason Dan Kissell shows us the rounded firebox - a traditional Nantucket design - he's building into the Bentley's new chimney. Upstairs, electrician Sally Bates is roughing in workboxes, using airtight plastic surrounds for those in the outside walls to aid in keeping the building well insulated. Installer Eric Branzetti runs the tubing for the central vacuum system and shows us the motor unit in the basement. Plumber Butch Ramos gives a tour of the rough plumbing, while out at Bruce Killen's workshop, work begins on the elegant Victorian brackets that will support the roof over the restored front entrance. Finally, the crew starts to wrap the house with a spun-bounded fabric to keep the winter drafts from blowing through the old sheathing.
18–11	"The Nantucket House - 11"	December 7, 1996
The show begins with a visit to the Wharf Rat Club, a collection of old-timers who gather to chat each morning in a former quahog-sorting shack on Old North Wharf. Then we check out the progress at the house: a Victorian-detailed chimney is complete, as is the custom bulkhead door. Inside, general contractor Bruce Killen goes over the features of the newly arrived windows - wood construction, factory-applied two-color paint scheme and exterior trim, interior energy panels, vinyl sash guides, tilt-in cleaning, excellent weatherstripping - and we see one go in. Then we meet energy conservation specialist David Weitz, whose company is using a three-part system - foam, high-density fiberglass batts and extra-tough vapor barrier - to bring This Old House up to the highest of insulation standards set for new housing. At the workshop, our master carpenter finishes off the exterior brackets by making intricate decorative in-fill on the bandsaw.
18–12	"The Nantucket House - 12"	December 14, 1996
Dr. Tim Lepore, the island's leading specialist in tick-borne diseases like Lyme disease and babeosis, tells us more about their prevalence here and what can be done to avoid them. At the house, preparations are underway for the installation of the restore Victorian double doors. Inside, Richard Trethewey shows us the new metal ductwork for delivery heating and cooling service for the house; he visits the shop where the metalworking is done. Outside, we get a lesson in sidewall shingling with Eastern white cedar, the preferred siding on Nantucket. Then we visit the Nantucket dump, rapidly reaching its capacity, and see the recycling facility that supervisor Jeff Willet hopes will reduce the flow of material and extend the life of the landfill. Back at the house, Bruce Killen and crew put up the front door roof, install the double doors and see what brackets will look like at the restored entrance.
18–13	"The Nantucket House - 13"	December 21, 1996
Realtor Hammie Heard shows us around the Dreamland Theatre, a downtown Nantucket landmark. First a Quaker meeting house, then a straw hat factory, then a roller rink, then part of a hotel on Brant Point before finally becoming the island's biggest movie theatre in 1904. Now for sale for $4.2 million, it stands as 15,000 square feet of pure potential with a great view. At the house, Bruce Killen takes a look at the interior insulation, used for sound deadening and heat zoning, and unpacks the new etched glass just in from California. Based on a rubbing of the surviving front door glass panel, it's a perfect match and the final touch on the refurbished Victorian entry. Our host arrives to see bluebarders David and Eric Sandrson tackling the tricky angles of the upstairs rooms, then goes with designer Jock Gifford to see a Victorian-style kitchen in another island home, part of Jock's work to help the Bentley's decide on the work of their new kitchen. Also helping in the kitchen design and ordering process is Gina MacVicar, who they visit at a local home center. Back at the house, Richard Trethewey and plumber Butch Ramos connect the ground-source heat pump to the hot water storage tanks and air handlers upstairs. Richard also tries out a new hole saw that reverses to expel the wood plug automatically. Finally, we review deck building techniques out by the new deck frame.
18–14	"The Nantucket House - 14"	December 28, 1996
After a ride out to the beach reservation known as Coatue with Nantucket Conservation Foundation director Jim Lentowski to see both the natural beauty of the preserve and a 1920's fishing shack, used by the foundation's rangers, that represents a simpler time on the island, we return to the house. Our master carpenter questions Bruce Killen on his preferred method of clapboarding: 3" exposure, sunken nails, and no back-caulking. Bruce shows him several examples of this "Nantucket style" in the neighborhood. Out back, foreman Mike Lynch shows us the new deck system, which uses Ipe, or Brazilian black walnut, an extremely hard and long-lasting hardwood. Our host takes viewers to a planned community called Nashaquisset, whose density, landscaping, and architectural detailing recalls traditional Nantucket. Back at the site, designer Jock Gifford shows us the Victorian fence he proposes for the house, citing a historical precedent on Main Street.
18–15	"The Nantucket House - 15"	January 4, 1997
We visit the Nantucket Marine Lab and its director, Rob Garrison, to see efforts to augment the island's scallop population. At the house, Bruce Killen tells us that the Historic District Commission has rejected as "too fancy" the proposed Victorian fence, approving instead a simple Quaker picket. Painters Gerry Ratnecht and George Loranger applied a plastic filler to nail holes, sand, and lay down a top-quality latex paint on an island used to oil. Inside, Bruce sees carpenter Joe Topham finish out a new window with traditional Victorian trim. We meet landscaper Michael Flanagan, who is dry-laying walls of Pennsylvania fieldstone, then plasterer Howie Nair shows us what's involved in repairing the broken plaster cornice mouldings in the front room. Finally, we catch up with energy-conservation specialist David Weitz as he conducts a blower-door test on the building, trying to seal it up to meet the high standards of the utility company.
18–16	"The Nantucket House - 16"	January 11, 1997
Our master carpenter boards the fishing boat of Capt. Tom Mleczko in search of the mighty striped bass and hooks one on his first cast. Fresh from his triumph, he arrives on the job to see a pressed-metal ("tin") ceiling going up panel-by-panel in the kitchen, while Barry Cohen and crew installing a decorative solid-surface bath stall in the kids' bathroom. In the mudroom, tiler David Goodwin (the fishing expedition's first mate), lays out a Welsh tile mudroom floor; viewers tour of the small factory in Whales where the tiles were manufactured.
18–17	"The Nantucket House - 17"	January 18, 1997
After a visit to the Milestone Cranberry Bog in time for the October harvest, viewers meet up with Bruce Killen who discusses the punch list - it looks like the project will not quite be finished by the show's last taping. Inside, tiler David Goodman shows our master carpenter how he copes a decorative tile molding for the powder room using a water-cooled diamond band saw. We visited with Chuck Davis, who brought back the old pine floors upstairs and is laying a new "floating floor" system in the rest of the house. Richard Trethewey and ground-source heat-pump expert Carl Orio fire up the new system and review the air-to-air heat exchanger in the attic, necessitated by the tight envelope the building now has. Our host arrives to find cabinet designer Gina MacVicar going over the kitchen, family room, and master suite cabinets, while outside, landscaper Mike Flanagan is putting in hydrangeas and day lilies to set off the crushed stone parking tray. Fence installer Ron Dugas shows us the new white cedar Quaker-style fence, with radii and gate.
18–18	"The Nantucket House - 18"	January 25, 1997
The crew starts off the last Nantucket show up to their chest in water, harvesting the succulent bay scallop. At the house, the final rush is on. Our master carpenter sees a wallbed unit going into the library/guest room, while Richard shows us some of the toilet fixtures and faucets for the house's new bathrooms. One of the toilets, which manufacturer calls the "Peacekeeper," flushes only by closing the seat. The following day, the crew arrives to find the final coat of paint going on the restored front doors, complemented by brass hardware whose high-tech finish will stand up to Nantucket's harsh seaside environment. Lighting designer Melissa Guenet takes viewers through some of the reproduction Victorian fixtures she's chosen for the house, while our host visits a lighting manufacturer's lab, where designers can learn how to use various types of fixtures to achieve the desire effect. Syd Conway, who grew up in the house, drops by to give his blessing on what's been done to the family homestead. Our host tours the nearly completed kitchen, with its stainless steel appliances and granite counters, then debriefs homeowners Craig and Kathy McGraw Bentley, who are pleased with the work that's been done. Finally, a belt-sander race at Bruce Killen's shop caps off the Nantucket project with accusations of equipment-tampering and race-rigging - and hearty thank-you's to the crew that make the project possible.
The Tucson House
18–19	"The Tucson House - 1"	February 1, 1997
This Old House travels to Tucson, Arizona for an eight-part winter project: the renovation and expansion of Jim and Colleen Meigs' 1930 Pueblo Revival home. After an overview of Tucson's sights - tract housing, golf courses, Old Tucson Studios, the Arizona-Sonora Desert Museum, the Air Force's "Boneyard" of old planes, Biosphere 2, and the magnificent Catholic mission San Xavier del Bac - we head to the Meigs' house, where we see that the homeowners have for nearly 20 years, they are pretty certain: a new kitchen, an outdoor cooking area, a finished courtyard with fountain, a media room, library, a new master suite and a new coat of stucco. Their target cost is around $150,000. As Jim is an architectural designer, we visit one of his completed houses. However, since as Jim puts it, "A new lawyer who defends himself has a fool for a client," he has hired an architect for his own job - Alexandra Hayes. She shows us the model she has built for the proposed project. Then general contractor John McCaleb shows us a fine home he has just completed and checks out the problems at the Meigs' place. The crew warns Jim and Colleen about the stress they're about to expose themselves to, but there is no stopping them.
18–20	"The Tucson House - 2"	February 8, 1997
The show opens at Casa Cordova, one of the last remaining pieces of early Tucson. Built in 1848 within the original presido ("walled fort") walls, the Casa is now preserved as part of the Tucson Museum of Art. At the job site, the crew arrives to find progress well underway. General contractor John McCaleb inspects termite and honeybee damage with continuing on to the new addition, whose walls are complete, put up in four days by a two-man crew using hollow building blocks made from recycled styrofoam and concrete. With rebar added horizontally and vertically and concrete poured in, the new walls achieve a remarkable R-36 rating. Then we visit the magnificent Catholic mission San Xavier del Bac, built in the late 1700s and now undergoing extensive renovations, some of which incorporate prickly pear juice! Then it's back to the house where plumber Dan LaBlue is using flexible plastic (PEX) tubing instead of copper for the building' water supply. The plastic tubing is nearly approved for use in Tucson, goes in fast, is impervious to aggressive water and is perfect for snaking through the minuscule crawlspace under the house.
18–21	"The Tucson House - 3"	February 15, 1997
The show opens with a hike in the natural splendor of Sabino Canyon, in the northern foothills of Tucson. At the house, a crew prepares and pours a colored and scored concrete floor, a typical detail in older Arizona homes. Homeowner Jim Meigs and our host discuss design issues concerning the new powder/laundry room and outdoor and indoor kitchens, and then we visit cabinetmaker James Vosnos at his shop, where the kitchen's cabinets are coming together in Mexican mesquite. Richard Trethewey and HVAC contractor Marshall Dennington review the heating and cooling system Marshall has design for the house, including a natural gas-powered air-conditioning unit, electronic air cleaner, humidifier, and high-function thermostatic controls. Finally, we visit Old Tucson Studios, a moviemaking mecca since the 1930s, recently rebuilt after a catastrophic fire.
18–22	"The Tucson House - 4"	February 22, 1997
An early morning breakfast at a traditional Mexican restaurant prepares the crew for a job site abuzz with traditional handwork and products, as well as state-of-the-art technology. Interior plaster goes up the old-fashioned way with Gilberto Chavez's crew, while we see a high-tech stucco system go on over the old adobe exterior. Contractor John McCaleb takes us to the historic colonial town of San Miguel de Allende in Mexico, a center for traditional crafts. In nearby Delores Hidalgo, the handmade terracotta tiles for the Meigs' veranda are hand made in a method nearly 300 years old. Back on site, Colleen Meigs sees the beginnings of her "endless" pool going in.
18–23	"The Tucson House - 5"	March 1, 1997
The show opens with a visit to the Arizona-Sonora Desert Museum, where the natural-looking environments are the result of painstaking human artistry, including the casting and construction of artificial rocks. On site, new windows have arrived, and window consultant Forrest Campbell explains their features, including true-divided-light appearance with thermal pane efficiency, custom-matched, high performance exterior paint, and, for the French doors, a one-move, three-point pin locking mechanism. Outside, the entire Meigs residence begins to get a new skin, as insulated board goes over the failed stucco, to be followed by a new fiberglass and acrylic stucco coat. HVAC installer Marshall Dennington explains why the system was broken into three separate units. In the master bath, David Kelly is putting in tile and electrician Dan LaBlue is installing a steam shower unit. Finally, we check in with Shelly Kessler and her crew, who are modifying the old bedroom floor with a walnut inlay to make it fit in with the room's new look as the library.
18–24	"The Tucson House - 6"	March 8, 1997
Before heading to the job site, we pay a visit to the Air Force's AMARC, a vast collection of mothballed aircraft preserved in the Tucson desert for use as parts, for storage, or for destruction. As the Meigs' house, Mexican tile is going down in the courtyard, the new mesquite kitchen cabinets are in place, and we see the process of putting in poured concrete countertops, a first for This Old House. The library cabinet is the work of Tom Klijian, who has fashioned floor-to-ceiling bookshelves out of black walnut. Viewers take a tour of Tucson straw bale houses - one finished, one under construction with expert Matts Myhrman and builder John Woodin. Tucson is a national center of this environmentally friendly building technology. Back on site, a beautiful set of glass doors seals off the steam shower.
18–25	"The Tucson House - 7"	March 15, 1997
After a trip downtown to Tucson's Hotel Congress, built in 1919 and the site of John Dillinger's hideout back in 1934, we return to the Meigs' house, concrete pavers are laying the driveway - consistent in size but varied in color, they form a hard-wearing cobblestone-like surface. We inspect the outdoor kitchen's gas barbecue, while in the indoor kitchen cabinetmaker James Vosnos puts the finishing touches on the mesquite cabinetry. James Murdock puts the finishing touches on the "endless" pool, while National Champion NCAA swimmer Seth Pepper test it out. Our plumbing and heating expert checks out the house's water treatment equipment, then takes viewers around Tucson to see the ongoing challenges the city faces in its struggle to satisfy its water needs. Our host takes a look at a new privacy glazing in the master bath - it uses a liquid crystal and electricity to switch between transparency and opacity while the flooring contractors finish up the library floor.
18–26	"The Tucson House - 8"	March 22, 1997
As the Tucson project enters its final days, our host takes viewers to Biosphere 2 in nearby Oracle. Site of two experiments in self-sustained living, Biosphere 2 is now part of Columbia University's earth sciences program, serving as a laboratory for research into the effects of so-called greenhouse gases thought to be causing global warming. At the house, the finishing coat of the re-stuccoing system is going on, as well as a water-based highly reflective and waterproof roof coating. We check out a termite control system that uses insect growth hormones rather than poison, then tour the Meigs' beautiful new kitchen, complete with mesquite cabinets, black concrete counters, and gleaming stainless-steel commercial-grade appliances. We find cabinetmaker Tom Klijian behind his new library shelves-cum-powder room door. On the final day, Richard Trethewey arrives to check out the master bath, with walk-in closet with custom shelving, whirlpool bath, separate toilet/bidet room and a mahogany-stained vanity designed and built by cabinetmaker John Olsen. In a tiny side room, a stackable, full-size Swedish washer/dryer system is working away nearly silently, using very little water and very little detergent. Interior decorator Anita Botthoff shows us around the living room, media room and master bedroom; we tour the landscaped courtyard; and the mariachi band strikes up for the wrap party, as This Old House wraps up its 18th season.

== Season 19 (1997–98) ==
- Steve Thomas's ninth season as the host.
- Starting with this season, This Old House goes on the internet with the launch of This Old House Online. This was done because PBS launched the official This Old House website.
- Starting with this season, This Old House Classics went from local syndication to cable television on HGTV, this didn't happen until early 1998.

No. in season	Title	Original release date
The Milton House
19–01	"The Milton House - 1"	September 27, 1997
This Old House kicks off its 19th season in the historic town of Milton, Massachusetts, founded in 1662 and the site of the c. 1725 Colonial home the show purchased for renovation and eventual sale. The This Old House crew looks the old structure over, including the massive post-and-beam barn on the property. The diagnosis: questionable room layout for modern life, some rot, but a remarkable sound house with a lot of potential. Jinny Devine, owner for the past 38 years, recalls raising her family of four boys in the home.
19–02	"The Milton House - 2"	October 4, 1997
Our host arrives to find excavator Herb Brockert preparing to knock down the rotting ell off the barn. The crew salvage a few valuable bits before it goes, including the cupola and an arched window. A group of young men, from a program that acts as an alternative to juvenile detention, work to dismantle the brick patio in the back of the house and haul in fiberboard to protect the house's delicate old floorboards. Architect Rick Bechtel and our host discuss some ideas about reworking the house's floor plan, including moving the kitchen from the dark northeast side to the sunny south. Our host goes to New York City to visit the Kips Bay Boys and Girls Club Decorators Show House, which has been going annually for 25 years, to get ideas for turning the Milton house into a similar showcase at the end of the renovation. Richard Trethewey checks out the house's aging heating system, complete with solar collector.
19–03	"The Milton House - 3"	October 11, 1997
The show opens with a visit to the top of Great Blue Hill and its historic weather observatory (built in 1885) to view the sights: the town of Milton, downtown Boston (8 miles northeast), and the 7,000 acres of parkland that comprise the Blue Hills Reservation. At the jobsite, the crew takes up planks in the front part of the barn in preparation for turning it into a garage; the structure reveals various areas of rot and poor construction. Forms are in place to accept the concrete coming to make up the new workshop's foundation, and landscape architect Tom Wirth assesses some of the site's challenges, including a lack of proper access to the front prospect of the house. Historic photos shows a gravel or shell drive that once passed by the home's front, and Tom thinks a similar scheme would be appropriate. Insulation specialist Graeme Kirkland shows us the results of a blower door test he's conducting: the house changes its interior air 11 times an hour in a simulated 15-mile-an-hour wind
19–04	"The Milton House - 4"	October 18, 1997
Norm lays out lines for subslab ductwork in his workshop, and the crew strips off the barn's old shingles. They will use a shingle panel system when they replace the siding. Tom Silva shows us his new jobsite trailer, leased complete with office and secure storage room. A surveyor works to put together a certified plot plan, while we see the excavation work around the main house for the kitchen foundation and for a perimeter drain along the front rubblestone foundation for years. In the barn, our master carpenter puts in one of the new post to make room for the garage to come - earlier he used new one-piece footing forms and a waterborne laser level to provide solid bases for the new posts, poured by a small-batch concrete delivery truck. In the future media room, the crew removes the lally column, holding up the building with jacks and a cripple wall before inserting a flitch beam of laminated veneer lumber and steel.
19–05	"The Milton House - 5"	October 25, 1997
Norm's workshop continues to take shape, as Richard Trethewey lays out radiant floor heating tubes over a layer of rigid insulation. We meet audio/visual systems contractor Steve Hayes to get a preview of what the new media room may look like, and visit a showroom to see the range of equipment options. We see a virtual walk-through of the new workshop put together by Randy Levere, while the crew tears down the old kitchen addition, which has revealed itself to be woefully built. Paint stripper Brooks Washburn uses a paraffin-based paste to remove dozens of layers of old paint from the front staircase, and Steve suggests trying it out on the historic front facade. Finally, the concrete arrives to complete the floor of the new workshop.
19–06	"The Milton House - 6"	November 1, 1997
A big day on the site: the structural insulated panels for the new workshop are hoisted into place - they, along with a massive ridge beam of engineered lumber, form the entire workshop structure, complete with window, door, and skylight openings. We are introduced to a range of metal roofing available to top off the workshop, while our host meets furniture and finishes restorer Robert Mussey in his shop, brings him back to the house, and gets some advice on the care and feeding of the historic pine paneling. Landscape architect Tom Wirth checks in with Milton town civil engineer Jim Greene about moving the driveway and any wetland issues involved.
19–07	"The Milton House - 7"	November 8, 1997
The house's new spaces are framed and sheated, giving us a chance to tour the new kitchen and media room. The front facade is now completely stripped of its burden of 200 years' of paint, ready for primer and a new color. Architect Rick Bechtel and window specialist Mike Roach discuss the new windows they are specifying for the new work (all wood units, double hung, insulating glazing, applied six-over-six muntins), and decide that, rather than being replaced, the historic sash of the front part of the building should be restored and weatherstripped. At the workshop, we see now, low-cost, breathable building wrap, then watch as the crew installs one of the new skylights. Then a roll-forming machine spits out metal roof panels for the building's new standing-steam roof. Finally, we see the engineered wood product that is being used to trim out the house - it's very stable, warpfree, consistent, and cheaper than clear pine.
19–08	"The Milton House - 8"	November 15, 1997
Victory Garden chef Marian Morash and kitchen designer Phil Mossgraber work to refine a plan for the new kitchen, with special attention to window and appliance placement. Out in the workshop, T.J. Silva uses an airless sprayer to apply a stainkilling primer to the interior walls and ceiling, while the crew begin to apply the newly arrived shingle system: 2' x 8' panels, prestrained, with braided corner units that go up quick and cost less than uninstalled traditional shingles. Security system consultant Steve Yusko shows us the wireless radio transmitter that will link the property's alarms with a central monitoring station, redundant with the regular phone link. In the media room, a/v expert Steve Hayes pulls speaker wires and adjusts the rooftop DSS (digital satellite system) dish to pull in a clear signal. Finally, lighting designer Josh Feinstein gives a tour of the many lighting control options available for the new house.
19–09	"The Milton House - 9"	November 22, 1997
Steve arrives to find Norm unpacking the new stationary woodworking tools for the workshop; they admire the newly shingled barn, whose panelized shingle system the general contractor estimates saved him almost two weeks' labor. At the main house, the crew shingles the low-pitch roof over the media room, taking special care to first cover the deck with a waterproofing membrane. Inside, we see the restructuring being done in the dining room: using engineered I-joist to level the ceiling and reinforce the floor above; carefully removing the old floorboards to get the rotted subfloor, strengthening it with more I-joist and a new plywood deck. Steve meets with chefs Julia Child and Marian Morash in the kitchen to discuss the layout, work surfaces, islands, tables, and flooring options. Out at the workshop, the team puts together the deck using an undermount system and decking made of recycled plastic bags and sawdust, and checks out the new woodworking tools.
19–10	"The Milton House - 10"	November 29, 1997
Richard Trethewey is on site to see the new gas line being laid and the old oil tanks removed, courtesy of a gas company program. Coppersmith Larry Stearns shows off the fabulous copper weathervane he's made for the new workshop cupola, which he and the master carpenter place the roof. Arborist Matt Foti and his crew work to clear the way for the new driveway, as well as cleaning up damage and debris from the spring's surprise snowstorm. We receive a tour of the studded up master bathroom, and watch as a new kind of retractable screen system is put in at the workshop's new French doors. Excavation contractor Herb Brockert shows us the work he's done laying in the new driveway and discusses his concerns about properly draining the site. Finally, paint expert Andrea Gilmore shows us the results of her research of the house's exterior: 16 coats of paint, the last eight of which were white, with earlier schemes ranging over from the original dark brown with red trim to a putty color
19–11	"The Milton House - 11"	December 6, 1997
Norm inspects the new garage doors, made of redwood to look like old-fashioned outswing carriage doors but operated like modern overheads. The construction crew thickens the sills of the new windows to match the old trim style and installs a three-window mulled unit in the kitchen. Steve tours Milton with realtor Susan Bolgar-Wiesjohn to see what kind of properties are available in this town of 25,000, just 9 miles from downtown Boston. Lighting designer Josh Feinstein gives us an overview of the workshop's new lighting package, while landscape architect Tom Wirth and architect Rick Bechtel discuss plans for the shade garden.
19–12	"The Milton House - 12"	December 13, 1997
A busy day at the site, as several weather-sensitive jobs are brought to completion. The crew puts in the final touches on the cedar clapboarding and window trim, explaining to us the fine points of keeping out the water. A new fiberglass bulkhead is installed, while painter Seth Knipe shows us the proposed colors for the main house. Inside we watch the insulation contractor Don Sawyer and crew spray a fast-expanding foam into the open stud bays of the media room, into the joist bays of the crawl space, and down into the cavities of the master bedroom's walls, whose old fiberglass has been pulled out. Outside landscape contractor Roger Cook supervises the installation of an in-ground sprinkler system to take care of the lawn-to-be, which a hydroseeding company sprays over the prepared soil. Elsewhere on the property, paving contractor Larry Torti shows us the new MacAdam driveway he's laying, using recycled paving as a base, liquid asphalt as a binder, and rice stone as a surface coat.
19–13	"The Milton House - 13"	December 20, 1997
Our host arrives to find the site thick with trucks delivering drywall, cement board, and interior wooden doors. In a rapidly filling barn, he meets electrician Allen Gallant installing a lightning arrestor on the workshop panel - it's a simple $25 device that protects all the house's and barn's outlets from damaging power surges. Off of the exercise room, a prefabricated cedar sauna goes in, while arborist Matt Foti trims and props up the old apple tree outside the workshop. Down by the road, stonewall builder David Nyren and crew build a farmer's wall across the old driveway opening and a riprap retaining wall at the bank cut for the new drive, and landscaper Roger Cook and crew lay in the shade garden's brick patio. Landscape architect Tom Wirth shows us choices for the latticework around the shade garden, and tells us about the specimen trees he's ordered for the property: a lacebark Chinese elm, two American hollies, and a cornelian cherry.
19–14	"The Milton House - 14"	December 27, 1997
The show opens at the Milton gravesite of Captain John Crehore (born 1694), the builder of the Milton house. At the house, our host checks out a new clogfree gutter system, a prefabricated wine cellar, and the central vacuum system. He and plumbing & heating expert review the hot water plan for the building: radiant tubing on the first floor, a high-efficiency gas burner and hot water tank downstairs, and a superinsulated pipe to take hot water to the barn. The This Old House team installs a prefabricated wainscoting in the house's dining room. In the kitchen, designer Phil Mossgraber checks in and unpacks the new cabinets, while writer Daniel Levy gives us a short historical tour of the old house, including a look at a secret passage that may have played a role in the Underground Railroad. In the patio garden, landscape contractor Rodger Cook works with members of the Milton Garden Club to plant the newly arrive shade plants, and accepts delivery of new trees from the nursery.
19–15	"The Milton House - 15"	January 3, 1998
The finishes have begun at the Milton project. We see the shellac and wax work painter John Dee is applying to the stripped old-growth white pine in the front wall - it now matches the look of the adjacent parlor. The crew directs a crane as it swings the new, 490-pound soaking tub through the master bath window. We visit the Wisconsin foundry where it was made. Meanwhile, tiling contractors the Ferrante brothers prepare 16 x 16 limestone tiles for the bathroom floor using an extra-tile wet saw. Outside, our host meets a termite exterminator who uses an insect growth hormone bait to wipe out subterranean colonies. Upstairs, HVAC contractor Ken Winchester shows us the very important air-to-air heat exchanger, which introduces fresh air that picks up the house's exiting stale, damp air. In the courtyard, the new iron fountain has arrived, and the crew puts the finishing touches of the green lattice cedar fence. We meet Glenn Bowman, who is cutting and installing soapstone countertops.
19–16	"The Milton House - 16"	January 10, 1998
The show opens to find landscaper Roger Cook and crew putting in a granite block curb around the driveway island to protect it from wayward vehicles. Inside, Charlie Abate shows us the butcherblock island countertop and discusses its care and feeding. In the old front rooms, painting contractor Steve Kiernan explains the steps he and his crew before painting the woodwork in the library and shellacking the wood in the parlor. Outside, the crew installs the new gas barbeque and side burner unit, while mason Lenny Belliveau shows us how he's dry laying a brick floor in the screen porch. Our plumbing & heating expert installs a chimney cap over one of the fireplace flues and shows us the aluminum liner he placed in the flue that handles the moist and relatively cool gas burner exhaust. Chiller units outside and barely detectable outlets inside make up the visible portions of the house's air-conditioning system. Jeff Hosking shows us the cleaning-screening-shellac-wax process by which he installs
19–17	"The Milton House - 17"	January 17, 1998
Interior designers begin their work as the construction crew scurries to finish up the job. Painter John Dee uses a wood filler to repair the deteriorating front door, while kitchen designer Phil Mossgraber shows us features of the cabinets and the newly installed appliances. A designer from Laura Ashley Home Stylings discusses the family room's while painted woodwork and ""crackle-coat"" wallpaper, while Glenn Bowman routes out an integral drainboard in the kitchen's soapstone countertop. Upstairs, we see the new electronic shower control, and designer Cheryl Katz describes the progress by which she went from raw space in the master suite to a finished design. Jeff Hosking and the crew lay a new wide-plank pine floating floor in the dining room and we see the ceiling mural decorative painter Julie Williams is putting up in the media room using a unique color-transfer medium.
19–18	"The Milton House - 18"	January 24, 1998
The show opens to find Roger Cook and crew laying down a sod lawn and we receive a one-button key-fob controller demo from security expert Steve Yusko. Inside the house, we see the new flower sink and check out the new high-efficiency front-loading washer and dryer. In the wine cellar, Quarterly Review of Wines editor Randy Sheahan tells us some of the hows and whys behind the 216 bottles he's chosen. In the media room, a padded fabric wallcovering goes up, while upstairs, carpet and a master closet system are installed. We meet Robin Raskin, editor of Family PC magazine, to see some of the must-haves for the home office. Lighting designer Josh Feinstein and electrician Allen Gallant shows us the lighting and control package in the kitchen, while our master carpenter gets a test-drive of the new media room with a/v contractor Steve Hayes. Tom Silva shows us the old-fashioned brushed-brass rim locks he's using throughout the house.
19–19	"The Milton House - 19"	January 31, 1998
The grand finale in Milton, with the house completed furnished with the work of 10 separate decorating teams. We tour the house, the barn and the grounds. The wrap party begins and the contractors and subs get a big thank you for a huge job well done.
The San Francisco House
19–20	"The San Francisco House - 01"	February 7, 1998
This Old House's team goes to San Francisco to take on a unique project: the conversion of a 1906 church (lately a synagogue) into a home for Mark Dvorak, a store designer, and his fiancee Laurie Ann Bishop. A tour of the building reveals cavernous spaces, an institutional feel, dated systems, but a fantastic view of the Bay. The homeowners invite our host to their current apartment, full of striking furnishings they plan to set off against minimalist palette of finishes in the new building. Architect Barbara Chambers is the ideal professional to help on the project, living and working in a similarly minimalist home of her own design. At the church, she leads the homeowners through a model of the proposed conversion, complete with a two-car garage in the basement, preserved chapel space, and kitchen, bath, and three bedrooms in the rear, two-story addition, formerly the synagogue offices. General contractor Dan Plummer check out the basement area, with its inadequate seismic engineering,
19–21	"The San Francisco House - 02"	February 14, 1998
The crew start the workday at the Powell Street cable car turntable, where cars are spun around by hand for the return trip over the Fisherman's Wharf. On site, general contractor Dan Plummer has three weeks of work to show: the woodwork in the chapel has been sanded, the baptismal fount has been filled with concrete for the new fireplace's foundation, and the entire rear addition has been gutted to the walls. The reason: termites. We meet exterminator Bill Pierce as he sprays down the plywood for the new subfloor with a borate solution; the new floor joists are of a pressure-treated Douglas fir that contains no arsenic or chromium, unlike conventional PT lumber. Richard sees a blown-in cellulose insulation treatment of the floor joist bays, while our host visits a Gap store that homeowner Mark Dvorak helped to design - the simple, monochromatic finishes are meant to push the clothes forward visually, and Mark and Laurie Ann plan a similar scheme for the church to highlight their furniture.
19–22	"The San Francisco House - 03"	February 21, 1998
The show opens at a spectacular spot: the top of the north tower of the Golden Gate Bridge, 48 stories above the Bay. At the site, Richard Trethewey shows the recycling Dumpster - almost everything coming out of the job is reclaimed at a facility across the Bay. In the basement, Richard gets the underfloor heating story from Larry Luttrell, who is using aluminum plates to direct the heat up through the chapel's old wood floor. Our host meets mason Jim Dayton, who explains the workings of a modern Rumford fireplace, while the master carpenter sees the framing work of Jim Pitcher and crew up on the second floor. Jim shows a rigid 3-4-5 framing square he's using, then we catch up with the window manufacturer's rep Glenn Eige to see the features of the new windows, including sound-deadening and infrared blocking. Richard visits a Berkley salvage yard where Mark and Laurie Ann have picked out some vintage fixtures, including two stunning lavatories. Back on the site, general contractor Da
19–23	"The San Francisco House - 04"	February 28, 1998
The show opens with a walk through the magnificent Muir Woods, home of the coast redwood, the world's tallest tree. At the house, where general contractor Dan Plummer is dealing with yet another of heavy rain, we see the lightweight concrete mixed and poured over the kitchen's radiant floor tubing. Our host gets the rundown on the building's sprinkler system from installed Fred Benn, including a dramatic demonstration. We visit the workshop of Peter Good in Oakland to see him building new exterior doors for the church - a matched pair for the front and a Dutch door for the side entrance. At the house, Jay Fenton shows the stainless steel flue he's installing above the new Rumford fireplace, while Dan Plummer and the team review the new stairs and the old-growth Douglas fir joist he's recycling into treads and risers.
19–24	"The San Francisco House - 05"	March 7, 1998
The crew visits Coloma, California, where the Gold Rush began in 1848, to see Sutter's Mill and try their hands at panning for pay dirt. At the house, a break in the rainy weather means the crew can put up the new redwood siding, while inside Richard Trethewey helps plumber Jeff Deehan retrofit a vintage lavatory with a modern mixing faucet. Homeowner Laurie Ann Bishop shows us the transforming effect of the new windows in the chapel, and an energy consultant demonstrates their heat-retaining capabilities with a thermographic camera. In the basement, Richard discusses the new heating plant (a combination boiler and hot water tank) and the manifold system that will control the building's radiant floor heat. Our host accepts delivery of the church's custom exterior doors, and a cleverly disguised garage is installed.
19–25	"The San Francisco House - 06"	March 14, 1998
Our host visits Alcatraz before heading off to the jobsite, where our master carpenter is hard at work installing the new front doors. First step: trimming them to fit the out-of-plumb opening. Progress in the chapel continues, with industrial halogen light fixtures being hung from the ceiling, while paint going over the dark wainscoting, and a cleft-slate surround gracing the Rumford firebox. Upstairs, the drywall has been treated with a bonding agent so that a two-coat finish plaster can be applied, the result of a last-minute decision by the homeowners. A zero-clearance fireplace centers the master bedroom, and plumber Jeff Deehan wrestles with an old-wall-mount sink, retrofitting it with a foot-pedal-controlled faucet. Our master carpenter continues on his doors, using a mortice jig to position and installs the hinges. Homeowner Mark Dvorak accepts delivery of the kitchen cabinets he designed - built in a computer-controlled manufacturing facility run by Paul La Bruna.
19–26	"The San Francisco House - 07"	March 21, 1998
The final episode on the San Francisco project begins with a visit to the Marin County Civic Center, Frank Lloyd Wright's only government building. At the site, Richard joins our master carpenter to do a little gardening in the ten square feet of soil in front of the church, then Richard gets the rundown on homeowner Mark Dvorak's new front-loading washing machine, which saves 60% of the electricity and 40% of the water used by conventional top-loaders. Our master carpenter trims out a window using a wood fiber and resin composite material, while our host checks out the last-minute work in the chapel, including bottom-up privacy shades, a clean up with a backpack vacuum, and the staining of the floor with a very dark stain. The next day starts off with homeowner Laurie Ann Bishop having fingerprints read into the new security system. We catch up with general contractor Dan Plummer as he puts together his second-floor punchlist, Mark shows Richard the finished kitchen, and the lighting designer, as This Old House wraps up its 19th season.

== Season 20 (1998–99) ==
- Steve Thomas's tenth season as the host.
- This Old House celebrates its 20th anniversary.
- WGBH launched the This Old House website, which is www.thisoldhouse.org.

No. in season	Title	Original release date
The Watertown House
20–01	"The Watertown House - 1"	September 26, 1998
The 20th anniversary season of This Old House kicks off with the renovation of a circa 1886 Victorian with a large circa 1915 rear addition, in the Boston suburb of Watertown, Massachusetts. Essentially untouched since it was built, the house was recently purchased by a young couple from nearby Cambridge, Christian Noen and Susan Denny, who were attracted by the classic neighborhood, spacious yard, and the relative affordability of Watertown. Along with the This Old House gang and designer/architect team Sandra and Tony Fairbank, they plan to address the house's many problems: a boggy basement and backyard. paint-encrusted siding, crumbling chimneys, outdated heating and wiring, and a labyrinthine floor plan that masks the house's spacious 5,000 square feet. The show opens with the This Old House team visiting a potential project that the show decided to pass on: ac. 1720 colonial that was nearly destroyed by a chimney fire. They tour the house to see what a fire can do to a building, and meet the homeowner who, with his insurance settlement, is resurrecting his old home. Then it's off to Watertown and the project the show did not pick, a sprawling 1886 Queen Anne-style house in the Boston suburb of Watertown, Massachusetts. Around 1915, the original structure was married to a Colonial Revival-style addition, and then given a period makeover. We receive a tour of the building and meet its new owners, Christian Nolen and Susan Denny, who have a designer/architect team in place and are ready to get to work.
20–02	"The Watertown House - 2"	October 3, 1998
Our host opens the show with a visit to the Watertown Arsenal, now decommissioned and slated for redevelopment into office space. The highlight of the property is the Italianate Commander's Residence, a brick mansion being given to the town by the developer for use as a community center. At the project, the crew experiments with methods of stripping the exterior of its paint burden, while our host visits a renovated house in Cambridge, whose design was the reason Christian and Sue chose their designer/architect team, Sandra and Tony Fairbank. Richard Trethewey checks the state of the heating plant (grossly oversized) and the pipes (mostly OK), and Sandra Fairbank and Christian go over a proposed reordering of the house's tangled floorplan.
20–03	"The Watertown House - 3"	October 10, 1998
The crew begins to dismantle the grand oak staircase as the house's new floorplan comes into focus - seen in a virtual-reality walkthrough, it calls for removing all three staircases and repositioning one in the center of the house, providing a sensible and easily navigated layout on both the first and second floors. We visit the house next door, which is for sale, with Realtor John Petrowsky, to get an idea on what the market is like and whether Christian and Sue are on the right track in the scope of their renovation. A professional crew removes asbestos from the basement of the project house, and the staircase comes apart in the three large sections
20–04	"The Watertown House - 4"	October 17, 1998
As a professionally installed scaffolding system rises up to the roof ridge, landscape architect Clarissa Rowe walks around the lot, assessing problems - mostly an overabundance of weedy trees and terrible drainage - and possible solutions. Our master carpenter relives his western odyssey with the US Forest Service, 22 miles into the wilderness by horseback to repair parts of an historic Service compound. Back at the house, the old second bath floor is demoted, but not before the crew save the old sink and some of the tiles.
20–05	"The Watertown House - 5"	October 24, 1998
The landscape work begins with landscaper Roger Cook and arborist Matt Foti marking trees slated for pruning or removal and Matt's crew relieving the yard of some of its overgrown burden. Inside, the crew begins to rebuild the old oak staircase in the center of the building while mason Lenny Belliveau assesses the state of the flues with the help of a tiny "lipstick" camera. Atop the scaffolding, we learn how he has rebuilt the chimneys from the roof up, copying the corbelled and decorated originals.
20–06	"The Watertown House - 6"	October 31, 1998
The team's work to complete the reframing of the second floor starts with the use of engineered lumber, which makes for wide clear spans in the new kitchen area. Landscape architect Clarissa Rowe shows us two plans for the yard. Thinking ahead, homeowner Christian Nolen visits a hands-on showroom to choose high-end appliances for the house, while Sue Denny and a/v specialist Steve Hayes review a new wiring and distribution system that will ensure that, no matter how data is sent or received in the future, the walls will never have to be opened to rewire.
20–07	"The Watertown House - 7"	November 7, 1998
The show opens with a walk along a newly restored natural corridor lining the banks of the Charles River in Watertown. The result of years of hard reclamation work by the Metropolitan District Commission, it forms part of an unbroken systems of walk and bikeways stretching from the mouth of the river west to Waltham. Back at the house, the crew opens up a water-damaged corner of the building to find rot, carpenter ants, and termites, Homeowner Christian Nolen is presented with a plan to heat and cool the building efficiently, while still using the existing ductwork. Our host visits the Browne House, circa 1690, the oldest house in Watertown, and one of the first restoration efforts by the Society for the Preservation of New England Antiquities. At the site, historic preservationist Andrea Gilmore explains the architectural features that make our subject house a Queen Anne Victorian, and she reveals its original colors.
20–08	"The Watertown House - 8"	November 14, 1998
A Dig Safe representative is on site to explain the nonprofit organization's function: to notify all utilities of impending excavation so that they can mark buried lines. Out back, Roger Cook and crew remove topsoil to begin the digging of a massive drywell that will hopefully control the water that drains from surrounding yards onto the property during rainstorms. The team review the extensive termite damage to the front sill; to replace it, they need to jack the balloon-framed wall above it - no easy task, since the floors are not really attached to the wall studs in this type of construction. Meanwhile, Christian and our host take a tour through the mocked-up kitchen, where Christian is asked a few pointed questions about the design.
20–09	"The Watertown House - 9"	November 21, 1998
Entomologist and pest control contractor Steve Marken takes us on a termite-damage tour of the house, pointed out the conditions that led to the original infestation. Out back, Roger Cook shows us the drywell and drainage pipe system he's installed to handle the water problem. The This Old House team work with excavator Jim McLaughin as they try to pull out the old galvanized water service, with a new copper pipe attached to the end, to replace the old pipe without having to dig up the front lawn. Homeowners Sue Denny and Christian Nolen experiment with exterior paint colors on the side of the building - our host advises them to consult with historic paint expert Andrea Gilmore. Inside, homeowner Christian learns the effect, or lack thereof, of the skylight he's considering installing over the central stairway.
20–10	"The Watertown House - 10"	November 28, 1998
Roger Cook and Christian Bilodeau plant 30-foot evergreens as a screen in the backyard, using Christian's tree spade. Tom updates us on the project's progress: termite damage has necessitated replacement of all three porches, rough wiring is well underway, and rough plumbing has already been inspected. Out on the front lawn, homeowners Christian and Sue put a first coat of finish paint on some of the 8000+ new red cedar shingles and shows us the historically accurate new paint scheme: light olive for the body, straw for the trim, and a pumpkin red for the decorative shingling and window sash. Electrician Allen Gallant links the house up with the live Boston Edison service from the street, while the crew cut through the roof for the new skylight. Finally, we visit the granite quarry and finishing yard where new pink granite blocks are being prepped for use on the front part of the Watertown house's foundation, matching the rest of the granite around the sides and back of the building.
20–11	"The Watertown House - 11"	December 5, 1998
The This Old House team installs a zero-clearance fireplace with a handsome cast-iron firebox. Window rehabilitation specialist David Liberty shows us his method of refurbishing the building's existing windows using old-fashioned, long-lasting materials. Show friend George Putnam works with a new stripping chemical to relieve the decorative carving on the front gable of its layers of paint, while our host visits the new owners of last season's home, the 1724 Colonial in Milton, Massachusetts. Our master carpenter checks in with a/v specialist Steve Hayes as he pulls "futureproof" wiring bundles through the walls and back to a central switching box. Finally, custom cabinet maker Ted Goodnow and homeowner Sue Denny shows us the progress they've made towards finalizing the kitchen's look.
20–12	"The Watertown House - 12"	December 12, 1998
A busy day on site: the back decking is coming along with a new undermount system. The insulation crew is hard at work inside spraying on foam insulation. Up top, Mark Schaub and his crew prepare to line the chimneys with a concrete lining poured down around bladders in each of the flues, and in the backyard, Dick Washburn shows us a unique dipping tank for stripping one of the house's old mantles of paint. In the relative quiet of the workshop, our master carpenter is fabricating a quartersawn white oak raised-panel piece for the bottom of the stairway. Finally, mason Lenny Belliveau works on the newly arrived pink granite blocks for veneering the foundation at the front of the building.
20–13	"The Watertown House - 13"	December 19, 1998
Exterior painting by Steve Kiernan and crew is underway out back, as is the erection of a white cedar combination fence and trellis along the driveway. In the kitchen, Fred Morgan explains to us the ancient process of terrazzo flooring, with a modern twist: instead of concrete, epoxy is used. Drywaller Mike Couillard shows us a tiler backing board, that unlike cementitous board, can be worked with regular drywall tools, as well as 56" wide drywall sheets that eliminate a seam when used in high-ceiled rooms such as ours. In the basement, Bill Clayton takes us through the perimeter drain and sump system his company has installed to deal with the flooding the house suffers during heavy rains. Roger Cook and crew unload trees and shrubs from a local nursery and begin sitting them around the yard. Finally, our host gets a lesson in granite work as Lenny Belliveau completes the foundation's stone veneer.
20–14	"The Watertown House - 14"	December 26, 1998
The show opens with a plumbing and heating tour of the basement, with stops at: a pressure-reducing valve that steps down the incoming water pressure from 110 psi to a more useful 65 psi; no-hub cast iron waste lines; two-burner high-efficiency boiler; and a topnotch ducting job that interfaces with an air handler, humidifier and electrostatic air cleaner. Upstairs, the terrazzo floor is polished. Our team installs a new window with guts of wood fiber and resins, a wood veneer interior and vinyl-clad exterior. Lighting designer Doreen Le May Madden takes us to a nearby lighting showroom to see what she has come up with for homeowner Sue Denny. Among the surprises is a fiber-optic lighting package.
20–15	"The Watertown House - 15"	January 2, 1999
A huge drywall goes in under the front lawn to handle water pumped out of the basement slump, and chimney specialist Mark Schaub and crew shows us the newly "Rumfordized" front parlor fireplace and the cast iron Victorian fireplace inserts they've installed in the dining room and in Sue's office. Homeowner Sue Denny uses a biodegradable stripper to remove built-up varnish from the old oak doors, while Tom and our master carpenter fabricate new fluted post and replica goosenecks for the house's porches. The new copper shingle system is being installed on all the porch roofs.
20–16	"The Watertown House - 16"	January 9, 1999
The This Old House team shop for lunch supplies at Eastern Lamejun Bakery, one of the oldest Middle Eastern grocery stores in the country. (The Watertown area is home to one of the largest Armenian populations in the country.) At the jobsite, Augustin Crookston and crew install copper gutters and downspouts as homeowners Sue Denny and Christian Nolen sift through the dumpster for some expensive mosaic tiles that were mistakenly thrown out during a jobsite clean up. We visit a larger-scale mine, the Kennecott Utah Copper facility in Salt Lake City, to see the complex process by which pure copper is extracted from ore. Back at the jobsite, floorman Pat Hunt and his crew restore the house's original quartersawn oak flooring and install new material that matches. Finally, the crew install the quartersawn oak wainscot that our master carpenter made in the New Yankee Workshop.
20–17	"The Watertown House - 17"	January 16, 1999
Our host arrives on site to find the building's exterior nearly complete: the new paint scheme is on, the copper gutter system is complete, and Tommy and crew have finished the front porch, from copper shingle roof to new front steps. Roger Cook and his crew are putting in a rice-stone front walk and garden path, leading to the formal herb garden at the house's south side. Inside, the big story is the arrival and installation of the kitchen cabinets. We visit the custom shop where they were made. In the front hall, finishes expert John Dee shows us how he is matching the old, stripped oak of the central staircase to the new oak of the wainscot, using different shades of traditional shellac. Upstairs, Joe Ferrante installs a complex pattern of marble tiles in the master shower, while the crew reassemble the scattered pieces of the central balustrade, handrail and newel posts.
20–18	"The Watertown House - 18"	January 23, 1999
Our host arrives to find Roger Cook and crew installing sod on the front lawn, while inside painting contractor Steve Kiernan gives him a lesson on proper prep and priming in the media room. The crew install the commercial-style hood over the cooktop in the kitchen. Our host continues the finishes tour by observing the decorative painting techniques of Iris Marcus, who is putting up a "silk moiré" pattern on the walls of the dining room. Our host takes us to see the other hand of the house's security system, visiting a central station that monitors houses and businesses across New England, while our master carpenter checks in with the closet system installers, who are working with a custom product made in Italy. We find electrician Allen Gallant working of the fiber-optic equipment that supplies light to the oak stairway. Finally, termite man Steve Marken injects a blanket of protection around the building's perimeter to insure that all the fine renovations will remain bug-free.
20–19	"The Watertown House - 19"	January 30, 1999
The final days of the Watertown project start with Richard Trethewey's tour of the completed kitchen, complete with stainless-steel cleanup sink, the completed baths, and the laundry. We get a lesson in wallpapering from expert John Gravallese. Hint #1: use a ton of single-edge razor blades. Decorative painter Julia Purinton and her crew show us their two-tone striped wall treatment in the guest bedroom. Craftsmen install a restored stained-glass panel in the front door and a brand-new one in the front wall. Lighting designer Doreen Le May Madden shows us the finished lighting package in the kitchen - including a dimmable fluorescent ceiling fixture - and the dining room, and Christian prepares some hors d'oeuvres in his new kitchen. We check out Susan's new office, where she's using a high-speed cable modem to surf the internet, including the new This Old House and New Yankee Workshop sites, and moves on to find Steve Hayes setting up the media room with some new, adjustable and tunable ceiling speakers. Finally, a wrap party puts a rocking end to a major project.
The Key West House
20–20	"The Key West House - 01"	February 6, 1999
Our host and master carpenter find paradise at the end of the famed U.S. Route 1 - Key West, Florida. Along the island's back streets they discover their latest renovation challenge, a Conch captain's house built by a shipwright in 1866. Over the course of seven new episodes, they will team with homeowner Michael Miller, who will also serve as the project's architect, to expand the vintage structure and refine its interior and exterior details. Watch and learn: A history of Key West architecture of embodied in the subject house.
20–21	"The Key West House - 02"	February 13, 1999
After catching the famous Mallory Square sunset the evening before, the This Old House team gets to work, first checking in with general contractor Roger Townsend to see the jobsite's progress while our master carpenter visits the local lumberyard to look at some of the building materials Key Westers use to beat the elements and stay true to local architectural traditions. Homeowner/architect Michael Miller takes us on a tour of one of his projects, and old Conch cottage converted into a library and guest room. Its porch is quintessential Key West - tongue-and-groove painted decking, simple columns, full dimension exposed rafters and beadboard ceiling - and serves as a model for what Michael and Helen want to do to their back porch. Back on site, excavator Ray Vanyo starts digging the pool, only to come across a buried cistern and a floating piece of Key West History. Watch and learn: The best materials to build with in semi-tropical and hurricane-prone climates.
20–22	"The Key West House - 03"	February 20, 1999
The show opens at one of Key West's most popular destinations, Harry Truman's "Little White House," where the President visited for many years after having originally been sent to the island to recover from a severe cold and exhaustion. Our heating and plumbing expert gives HVAC contractor Charle Roberts a walk-through of the high-velocity, flexible-duct air conditioning package, making its debut in Key West. Out back, pool excavator Ray Vanyo continues to struggle with the challenge of working in a confined space. Back at the jobsite, homeowner Michael Miller shows us his plans for the new library. Finally, our four Northerners sneak off to watch the sailboats battle it out in the Key West Race Week heats. Watch and learn: Innovations in water conservation.
20–23	"The Key West House - 04"	February 27, 1999
The show opens at Truman Annex, a planned community on land that was formerly Key West's naval station. Later in the show, we tour another planned community, the town of Celebration, with architect Graham Gund. A Disney venture, it was built from scratch over the last four years, with the participation of some of the world's best-known architects. Back at the project house, Roger Townsend shows us the fully framed great room and the nearly complete rough plumbing and electrical work, as he awaits inspections before the insulation crew arrives. Homeowner Michael Miller finally makes his decision about the back porch: take it down and rebuild it in a style more in keeping with the rest of the house. Finally, we check out lap-siding Key West-style, and the foam insulation, another island first, starts to go in. Watch and learn: Porch construction and building and community development.
20–24	"The Key West House - 05"	March 6, 1999
The show opens at Key West's biggest industries—cruise ships. The This Old House team takes a tour of Carnival's Ecstasy, in port for the day. Back at the house, a glazier cuts and beds restoration glass—mouth-blown, like glass from the 1800s—in the new replacement sash. Outside, lead carpenter Bev Horlick and crew use 3" × 4" rafters to frame up the new porch roof, a crew sprays concrete to form up the new pool. Then we take a ride up to Savannah, Georgia, to tour the millwork shop that is building the library cabinets to homeowner Michael Miller's specifications. The show ends with us checking out the new skylight. Watch and learn: Building fine cabinetry and considerations for insulating island homes.
20–25	"The Key West House - 06"	March 13, 1999
Just as they're getting used to all the sunshine, the crew realizes it's almost time to wrap up the Key West project. The activity on site is intense. Window installer Charles Malta reviews the options in balancing the traditional sash he's installing - vinyl with springs, tube, tape and good old prop sticks. We see the Italian-made kitchen going on in and admire its style, mechanics and ease of installation. Afterward, the molded urethane window trim is applied in the dining room. In the library, we see the first of the cabinets to arrive from Savannah and then take a tour of an exquisitely restored and furnished Key West "eyebrow" house. Back on site, the flooring contractor inlays the river-recovered heart pine floor with a diamond pattern of rare curly pine. With a thunderstorm quickly approaching, we watch v-crimp metal roofing go on the new rear roof. Watch and learn: How to install metal roofing.
20–26	"The Key West House - 07"	March 20, 1999
On our last day in Key West, viewers get a look at the new pool, its cleaning system and the heat pump that both heats and cools it. (Key Westers have to chill down their pools during the brutal summers.) Inside, we see the handiwork of tileman Tom Lapp, who is putting the finishing touches on a beautiful entryway of black and white, concrete Cuban tiles. Outside, painter Perry Fergus and crew are using a latex topcoat for the house's body and trim, and a high-gloss oil for the new shutters. Vierers then visit the local shop where they were made. Back at the house, lead carpenter Bev Horlick installs the first of several mahogany French doors made by the same shop, using heavy brass hinges and tarnish-proof handles. Our host checks out the new landscaping with contractor Mari Blair, who has used a variety of native plants, an irrigation system and low-voltage lighting. Our master carpenter agrees with homeowner Michael Miller that rushing the cabinetry in the library is not a good idea, then checks in with electrical contractor Will Benson to see a dimmable incandescent strip that provides even uplighting along the great room's valence. Also on site are halogen wallwashers to highlight artwork and handmade brass lanterns that echo the house's sea-faring roots. Homeowner Helen Colley shows off her completed galley kitchen. Richard tours the completed master suite as This Old House wraps up its 20th anniversary season.
