= List of This Old House episodes (seasons 31–40) =

This Old House is an American home improvement media brand with television shows, a magazine and a website, ThisOldHouse.com. The brand is headquartered in Stamford, CT. The television series airs on the American television station Public Broadcasting Service (PBS) and follows remodeling projects of houses over a number of weeks.

Season	Episodes	Originally released	
Season	Episodes	First released	Last released
1	13	January 1, 1979	June 30, 1979
2	27	January 1, 1981	September 28, 1981
3	13	January 1, 1982	May 1, 1982
4	26	May 15, 1982	December 7, 1982
5	26	October 1, 1983	March 24, 1984
6	26	October 5, 1984	March 29, 1985
7	26	October 10, 1985	April 3, 1986
8	26	October 16, 1986	April 9, 1987
9	26	January 1, 1987	September 15, 1987
10	26	September 1, 1988	February 23, 1989
11	26	January 1, 1989	September 15, 1989
12	26	September 1, 1990	March 22, 1991
13	26	September 5, 1991	March 19, 1992
14	26	January 1, 1992	September 15, 1992
15	26	September 2, 1993	March 24, 1994
16	26	January 1, 1994	March 22, 1995
17	26	September 3, 1995	March 23, 1996
18	26	September 28, 1996	March 22, 1997
19	26	September 27, 1997	March 21, 1998
20	26	September 26, 1998	March 20, 1999
21	26	September 25, 1999	March 18, 2000
22	26	September 23, 2000	March 17, 2001
23	26	September 22, 2001	March 16, 2002
24	26	October 10, 2002	April 3, 2003
25	26	October 11, 2003	April 1, 2004
26	26	October 9, 2004	April 2, 2005
27	26	October 6, 2005	March 30, 2006
28	26	October 5, 2006	March 29, 2007
29	26	October 4, 2007	March 27, 2008
30	26	October 2, 2008	March 26, 2009
31	26	October 10, 2009	April 3, 2010
32	26	October 7, 2010	March 31, 2011
33	26	October 6, 2011	March 29, 2012
34	26	October 4, 2012	March 28, 2013
35	26	October 5, 2013	May 3, 2014
36	26	October 4, 2014	May 30, 2015
37	26	October 3, 2015	May 28, 2016
38	26	October 1, 2016	June 3, 2017
39	26	October 7, 2017	June 2, 2018
40	26	October 6, 2018	May 25, 2019
41	26	October 5, 2019	May 31, 2020
42	26	October 4, 2020	June 6, 2021

Note: Episodes are listed in the original broadcast order

== Season 31 (2009–2010) ==
- Kevin O'Connor's seventh season as the host.

No. in season	Title	Original release date
Newton Centre
31–01	"Welcome to Newton Centre"	October 10, 2009
31–02	"Quality, Not Quantity"	October 17, 2009
31–03	"Work Begins, Homeowners Decide to Stay"	October 24, 2009
31–04	"Origins of the Dutch Colonial Revival"	October 31, 2009
31–05	"New Gambrel Addition Takes Shape"	November 7, 2009
31–06	"Making Room for New Windows"	November 14, 2009
31–07	"Pruning Hemlocks and Checking in on TOH Austin"	November 21, 2009
31–08	"Father and Son Lend a Hand"	November 28, 2009
31–09	"Radiant Heat, Two Ways"	December 5, 2009
31–10	"Inspired Openings and Insulating the House"	December 12, 2009
31–11	"Never Paint Again"	December 19, 2009
31–12	"Stone, Tile and Oak Finishes"	December 26, 2009
31–13	"The New Kitchen is Coming Together"	January 2, 2010
31–14	"Interior Painting Primer and Fabricating Our New Countertops"	January 9, 2010
31–15	"Is the Island Too Big?"	January 16, 2010
31–16	"The Finished Project"	January 23, 2010
The Roxbury House
31–17	"Project with Purpose Begins"	January 30, 2010
31–18	"Mounting Challenges"	February 6, 2010
31–19	"More Trouble than We Thought"	February 13, 2010
31–20	"Coming Together"	February 20, 2010
31–21	"Help From Our Friends"	February 27, 2010
31–22	"Oak Doors, Fireplace Surround"	March 6, 2010
31–23	"Custom Details"	March 13, 2010
31–24	"Roxbury Past and Present"	March 20, 2010
31–25	"Looking Back and Looking Ahead"	March 27, 2010
31–26	"One Less Foreclosure in Boston"	April 3, 2010

== Season 32 (2010–11) ==
- Kevin O'Connor's eighth season as the host.

No. in season	Title	Original release date
The Auburndale House
32–01	"A Ho-Hum House on The Charles River"	October 9, 2010
32–02	"Regulations and Challenges"	October 16, 2010
32–03	"Bringing in the Structure"	October 23, 2010
32–04	"Fixes, Framing, and Floods"	October 30, 2010
32–05	"A New Approach to the House"	November 6, 2010
32–06	"The Artistry of TOH and Jules Aarons"	November 13, 2010
32–07	"Progress On All Levels"	November 20, 2010
32–08	"Shingles, Ductwork, Lights, and a Pocket Door"	November 27, 2010
32–09	"Stucco, Kitchen Design, Roof, and Insulation"	December 4, 2010
32–10	"Landscape Decisions and a Duck Tour"	December 11, 2010
32–11	"Planning for the Pergola"	December 18, 2010
32–12	"Making the Most of Green Products"	December 25, 2010
32–13	"Absolute Curb Appeal"	January 1, 2011
32–14	"Front Yard Transformation"	January 8, 2011
32–15	"Systems, Security and Surfaces Take Shape"	January 15, 2011
32–16	"Transformation Complete!"	January 22, 2011
Los Angeles House
32–17	"TOH Goes Hollywood, Almost"	January 29, 2011
32–18	"Only in LA"	February 5, 2011
32–19	"Roof Tiles & Richard's Water Story"	February 12, 2011
32–20	"Secrets of Silver Lake"	February 19, 2011
32–21	"It Never Rains In California?"	February 26, 2011
32–22	"Spanish Style: Stucco, Ornamental Iron, Hand Glazed Tile"	March 5, 2011
32–23	"Kevin Goes Hollywood"	March 12, 2011
32–24	"Spanish Plaster, Soapstone, and a Star"	March 19, 2011
32–25	"More Spanish Style"	March 26, 2011
32–26	"So Long To Silver Lake"	April 2, 2011

== Season 33 (2011–12) ==
- Kevin O'Connor's ninth season as the host.

No. in season	Title	Original release date
The Bedford House
33–01	"Welcome to the Bedford Project"	October 6, 2011
33–02	"And the Work Begins"	October 13, 2011
33–03	"Work on the Addition Begins"	October 21, 2011
33–04	"New Entrance, Old Bricks"	October 27, 2011
33–05	"Yard and New Gable Wall"	November 3, 2011
33–06	"New Space Revealed"	November 10, 2011
33–07	"Insulation, Roofing"	November 17, 2011
33–08	"Kitchen Inspiration"	November 24, 2011
33–09	"A New Driveway"	December 4, 2011
33–10	"Interior Design Ideas"	December 8, 2011
33–11	"Milestones In and Out"	December 15, 2011
33–12	"A Major Milestone"	December 22, 2011
33–13	"On the Right Path"	December 29, 2011
33–14	"Doors and Tabletops"	January 8, 2012
33–15	"Final Touches"	January 12, 2012
33–16	"Final Reveal"	January 19, 2012
The Barrington Beach House
33–17	"An Introduction"	January 26, 2012
33–18	"Hurricane Irene"	February 2, 2012
33–19	"Building a Clambake!"	February 9, 2012
33–20	"A Newport Mansion"	February 16, 2012
33–21	"Coastal Landscape"	February 23, 2012
33–22	"The Finishes Begin"	March 1, 2012
33–23	"Cherry Kitchen"	March 8, 2012
33–24	"Wall Dressing"	March 15, 2012
33–25	"The Finish Line"	March 22, 2012
33–26	"Another Project Wraps"	March 29, 2012

== Season 34 (2012–13) ==
- Kevin O'Connor's tenth season as the host.
- Beginning with this season, This Old House introduced its current theme song, composed by Bill Janovitz.

No. in season	Title	Original release date
The Cambridge 2012 House
34–01	"Scandinavian Modern?"	October 4, 2012
34–02	"Deconstruction and Design"	October 11, 2012
34–03	"Modernizing a Balloon Frame"	October 18, 2012
34–04	"Swedish Style"	October 25, 2012
34–05	"Landscape Plans, Roof Deck"	November 1, 2012
34–06	"Exterior Improvements"	November 8, 2012
34–07	"Old and New in Harmony"	November 15, 2012
34–08	"Plaster, Shingles, Radiant Heat"	November 22, 2012
34–09	"Gutters, Range, Fireplace"	November 29, 2012
34–10	"Swedish Design Details"	December 6, 2012
34–11	"Window Seat, Stairs, Knee Walls"	December 13, 2012
34–12	"Drywells, Kitchen Design, Deck Tiles"	December 20, 2012
34–13	"Hearthstone, Butcher Block Island"	December 27, 2012
34–14	"Secondary Spaces"	January 3, 2013
34–15	"The Big Finish"	January 10, 2013
The Essex House
34–16	"A Cottage in the Woods"	January 17, 2013
34–17	"Human Centered Design, Demolition"	January 24, 2013
34–18	"One-Level Living"	January 31, 2013
34–19	"Water Feature, Geothermal Heat"	February 7, 2013
34–20	"Cottage Style"	February 14, 2013
34–21	"Standing-Seam Roof, Lighting Rods"	February 21, 2013
34–22	"Rustic Plaster, Advanced Septic"	February 28, 2013
34–23	"Shiplap Walls, Finished Yard"	March 7, 2013
34–24	"Tiling, Floor Stains"	March 14, 2013
34–25	"Design for Everyone"	March 21, 2013
34–26	"A Home for Mom and Dad"	March 28, 2013

== Season 35 (2013–14) ==
- Kevin O'Connor's eleventh season as the host.
- This Old House celebrates its 35th anniversary.

No. in season	Title	Original release date
Jersey Shore Rebuilds
35–01	"After the Storm"	October 3, 2013
35–02	"Drastic Measures"	October 10, 2013
35–03	"Getting to Work"	October 17, 2013
35–04	"Built for Speed"	October 24, 2013
35–05	"Lines in the Sand"	October 31, 2013
35–06	"Go With the Flow"	November 7, 2013
35–07	"Stories from Sea Level"	November 14, 2013
35–08	"One Year Later"	November 21, 2013
The Arlington Italianate House
35–09	"A New Project in Arlington, Massachusetts"	January 4, 2014
35–10	"Old House Discoveries"	January 11, 2014
35–11	"Concrete Jungle"	January 16, 2014
35–12	"Quest for a Dry Basement"	January 23, 2014
35–13	"Getting to Level"	January 30, 2014
35–14	"Details on the Addition"	February 6, 2014
35–15	"Arlington Heights"	February 13, 2014
35–16	"Italianate Inspiration"	February 20, 2014
35–17	"Deadliest Old House?"	February 27, 2014
35–18	"Old World, New World"	March 6, 2014
35–19	"Hydrangeas and Hail Storms"	March 13, 2014
35–20	"Water, Water Everywhere"	March 20, 2014
35–21	"Brick, Trim, and Tile"	March 27, 2014
35–22	"Soapstone, Oval Frame"	April 3, 2014
35–23	"Made In The Shade"	April 10, 2014
35–24	"Decorative Details"	April 17, 2014
35–25	"Vent Hood, Garbage Disposers, Crown Molding"	April 24, 2014
35–26	"Italianate Renaissance"	May 1, 2014

== Season 36 (2014–15) ==
- Kevin O'Connor's twelfth season as the host.

No. in season	Title	Original release date
The Charlestown 2014 House
36–01	"35 Years of This Old House"	October 2, 2014
The renovation of a home in Boston's oldest neighborhood, Charlestown; a plan for the basement; testing for lead paint.
36–02	"Brick Rowhouse Blues"	October 9, 2014
A major problem -- exterior walls bowing out from the weight of the roof -- is solved; opening up the back wall for the new bump out.
36–03	"A Bridge to Charlestown"	October 16, 2014
Modifying the old chimney for gas fireplace units; framing the third floor master suite; options for rebuilding the retaining walls; progress on rough plumbing and electrical.
36–04	"Wood and Water"	October 23, 2014
Waterproofing the dormer; installing a reclaimed brick veneer on the new kitchen bump out; replacing fake shutters with operable shutters made of fiberglass.
36–05	"Gardens and Greek Revival"	October 30, 2014
Roughing in ductwork for new direct vent gas fireplace units; adding Greek Revival details to the interior window trim; painting the exterior window trim; color choices for the front door.
36–06	"Kitchens and Baths"	November 6, 2014
Adding a Greek Revival-style front door; kitchen cabinets; wall insert for the master shower; installing a small section of copper roof.
36–07	"Rowhouse, Lighthouse"	November 13, 2014
Cararra marble island top; PVC fence; restoring weather-beaten front steps; installing a marble mantel.
36–08	"A Rowhouse Reimagined"	November 20, 2014
Restored exterior includes a new dormer, windows, shutters and front entry; Internet-based security system; mechanical room; third floor master suite; sitting room; new kitchen.
Lexington Colonial
36–09	"Colonial Roots"	January 1, 2015
36–10	"Footings and Foundations"	January 8, 2015
36–11	"Colonial Curb Appeal"	January 15, 2015
36–12	"Smart Solutions"	January 22, 2015
36–13	"Making Connections"	January 29, 2015
36–14	"Exterior Details"	February 5, 2015
36–15	"Inspections"	February 12, 2015
36–16	"Conservation Concerns"	February 19, 2015
36–17	"Old to New"	March 26, 2015
36–18	"Designer Details"	April 2, 2015
36–19	"New Walk, Old Stone"	April 9, 2015
36–20	"Mudroom, Ventilation, Kids' Rooms"	April 16, 2015
36–21	"Finishing Details"	April 23, 2015
36–22	"Down to the Wire"	April 30, 2015
36–23	"Garrison No More"	May 7, 2015
The Veteran's Special House Project
36–24	"The Veteran's Special House Project"	May 14, 2015
36–25	"Adaptation & Accessibility"	May 21, 2015
36–26	"A Home for Matt & Cat"	May 28, 2015

== Season 37 (2015–16) ==
- Kevin O'Connor's thirteenth season as the host.

No. in season	Title	Original release date
The Belmont Victorian House
37–01	"Dude, Where's My Victorian?"	October 1, 2015
37–02	"The Kitchen Came Tumbling Down"	October 8, 2015
37–03	"Bracing the Basement"	October 15, 2015
37–04	"It's All About the Beams"	October 22, 2015
37–05	"It's Foundation Time"	October 29, 2015
37–06	"Opening The Entry"	November 5, 2015
37–07	"Victorian 2.0"	November 12, 2015
37–08	"Antiques for an Antique House"	November 19, 2015
37–09	"True Colors"	December 31, 2015
37–10	"Victorian Warmth"	January 7, 2016
37–11	"Grinding Out the Details"	January 14, 2016
37–12	"This Old Tree House"	January 21, 2016
37–13	"What's Old Is New Again"	January 28, 2016
37–14	"Inside-Out Restoration"	February 4, 2016
37–15	"The Final Countdown"	February 11, 2016
37–16	"Good-bye, Tired Old House"	February 18, 2016
The North Shore Farmhouse
37–17	"This Old New House"	March 24, 2016
37–18	"The North Shore Is a Blast"	March 31, 2016
37–19	"Truck In The New House"	April 7, 2016
37–20	"North Shore Framezilla"	April 14, 2016
37–21	"Up on the Roof"	April 21, 2016
37–22	"400 Years of Home Technology"	April 28, 2016
37–23	"Making New Look Old"	May 5, 2016
37–24	"House Requires Some Assembly"	May 12, 2016
37–25	"A Race to the Punch List"	May 19, 2016
37–26	"What's New Is Old Again"	May 26, 2016

== Season 38 (2016–17) ==
- Kevin O'Connor's fourteenth season as the host.

No. in season	Title	Original release date
Arlington Arts & Crafts
38–01	"Arts and Crafts Class Begins"	September 29, 2016
Kevin, Norm, Roger, Richard, and Tommy are back in Arlington—this time at an early English-style Arts and Crafts house built in 1909. Kevin meets the homeowners Nick and Emily, both originally from Arlington, and gets a look at the first floor to see what has been preserved and what has been altered over the years. Meanwhile, Norm goes upstairs to check out the plans for the second and third floors. Outside, Roger and Emily take a walk around the property with landscape architect Kim Turner to discuss how the homeowners envision using the space. Down in the basement, Richard shows Kevin the inefficient boiler and talks about plans for future mechanical and plumbing systems. Back upstairs, homeowner Nick is up for his first task: demolishing the outdated kitchen.
38–02	"A New Look, Inside and Out"	October 6, 2016
The design process kicks off with a meeting at interior designer Jill Goldberg's shop in Boston's South End. Homeowner Emily sorts through colors and wallpaper ideas for the living room to brighten up the house. Back at the house the old plaster walls are carefully demolished. Landscape architect Kim Turner presents her first landscape plan to Nick and Emily outside, and Roger brings in a certified arborist to begin removing the old Silver Maple. Kevin and Tommy bring down the exterior back wall to make room for the new addition.
38–03	"Make Way for the Family Room"	October 13, 2016
Tommy and Kevin replace a 100-year-old wooden beam with a new steel beam to provide support for the new addition. Norm visits local examples of Arts & Crafts style houses with historian Richard Duffy. The old oil tank gets drained and removed by a specialist. Digging for the new foundation begins and the old concrete pieces from the patio and foundation get transported to a recycling center. Tommy shows Kevin what happens to the material once it is there and how it is used for future construction material.
38–04	"Foundation Fundamentals"	October 20, 2016
Kevin meets Tommy in the old playroom, looking out over the work on the new foundation. Tommy shows Kevin the ICF's (insulated concrete forms) that replace traditional foundation molds. They discuss the high efficiency achieved with this system. Then Tommy introduces Kevin to Kent Reusswick, who supervises the installation. Kent's crew finishes the job and is there when the concrete is poured. Homeowner Emily, joins Roger Cook and Landscape Architect Kim Turner on a shopping trip to find mature specimen trees for the yard. Back at the addition, a precast concrete bulkhead is installed. The old rubble foundation that was exposed during the excavation for the addition needs reinforcement. Mason Mark McCullough erects a concrete wall next to it to keep the house standing for another century. Before backfilling, the old foundation that's exposed outside gets waterproofed with a synthetic rubber spray.
38–05	"A Steely Den"	October 27, 2016
Tommy and Kevin take a road trip to see how the steel beams used in our house are fabricated. The beams are trucked to the site and Kevin finds Tommy supervising erection on the back of the house. The third floor has been demo'ed and now Richard can start an HVAC plan for the second floor. He's looking on the third floor for a location for an air handler and duct work to provide air to the floor below. The front porch must be demo'ed to make way for a new design. With the help of heavy machinery, Tommy's crew does the job quickly. Then Tommy walks Kevin through the process of placing footings for the new porch. Kevin finds Mark McCullough working on the firebox. Kevin wants to learn the dark art of figuring firebox size and chimney height.
38–06	"One Brick at a Time"	November 3, 2016
Now that the firebox is installed, it's time to start the new chimney for the addition. Mark McCullough, expert mason on the project, gets an apprentice for the day—a homeowner. Then he travels to Bridgewater, MA to visit a brick-making factory and gets a tour from the 4th generation owner, Lincoln Andrews. Mark watches how the bricks are mixed, formed, cut, and baked at the 100-year-old factory that provides bricks throughout New England. After several years with a tiny kitchen, Emily and Nick are excited to design the space of their dreams. Kevin meets them at a cabinet shop in the quaint New England city of Bath, Maine, where kitchen designer Heather Krausse reveals her ideas for their project. Back at the house, Kevin finds Tommy up on the roof changing the pitch of the two back dormers to match the pitch of the new gable created by the addition.
38–07	"To Paint or Not to Paint"	November 10, 2016
The homeowners want a unique look for their kitchen. They think a custom range hood will fill that vision. Kevin visits the shop of Ed Packard, otherwise known as the Tin Man, to find out how the range hood is coming together. The original chimney has seen better days and needed to be demo'ed. Kevin goes up on the roof to watch Mark McCullough build a new one. Nick and Emily need to make some design choices in order to move construction along. Kevin finds Emily and Jill Goldberg, the designer, in the new family room discussing options for the fireplace. They want to somehow hide the television, which will be over the fireplace. Other decisions to make are tile for the first floor powder room and whether to paint the wood panels in the living room. Up on the third floor there's a small problem that Norm and Charlie Silva need to figure out. All the way down in the basement, both the original floor and new slab floor are being coated with a speckled epoxy.
38–08	"A New Look to Match the Old"	November 17, 2016
Demo of the old walls for the addition revealed a hidden doorway to the kitchen from the main hall. Norm and Charlie tackle the job of opening up the old entryway. The homeowners have a beautiful design plan for the new master bath, but it presents a classic plumbing problem. Richard shows how the open space below the bath must be traversed by drain and vent pipes. There are several distinctive features that will change the front of the house. The roof on the front porch has a special shape, as do the brackets on the side of the house. To create the elaborate cuts required for these features, Tommy's team turns to a special shop that creates them with computerized cutting machines. Norm gets a tour of the shop and sees the brackets and porch rafters in the making. Back at the jobsite, electrician Scott Caron gets started with his work in the first floor powder room where he installs a ceiling fan, and gets ready for switches and outlets. The living room had three single-pane windows that did not open. Nick and Emily want to replace them with double-hung windows that fit with the Arts and Crafts style of the house. Today, Tommy and Charlie are putting in new, energy-efficient windows.
38–09	"Arts and Crafts from Top to Bottom"	November 24, 2016
The project's old front porch was a hodgepodge design: part permanent, part temporary. Kevin finds Tommy framing the new front porch using custom-cut and assembled rafters. The new design puts an Arts and Crafts punctuation mark on the front of the house. Nick and Emily have chosen special marble from Danby, Vermont, for their countertops. Richard travels to the world's largest underground quarry, where the stone originated, to find out how marble makes its way from inside the mountain to inside the kitchen. Emily wants the new exterior color of the house to fit in with the Arts and Crafts design. She has brought in preservation specialist Sally Zimmerman to help with the color selection. Norm catches up with them to find out what they have decided. Stucco panels are part of the Arts and Crafts charm of the project house, but they need work. Mark McCullough, in the process of fixing panels, shows Kevin the lost art of stucco.
38–10	"Shedding the Old Look"	December 1, 2016
Homeowner Emily has always wanted an enclosed space for her yoga and decides that an outdoor shed would be the perfect solution. Kevin meets the foreman of the shed company who will oversee the one-day process. The walls come preassembled and are raised like an old-fashioned barn raising. Tommy comes by at the end to inspect the construction. On the main house, a standing-seam copper roof is installed over the front porch. Kevin and Tommy watch the final pieces go on. Tommy shows Kevin how to trim a window using a PVC product. He shows Kevin his special technique of using a rabbet joint to connect the joints. Down in the basement, Richard watches as plumber Kevin Bilo installs a state-of-the-art boiler. This new system will take a huge bite out of the high heating bill. Next, Richard takes a road trip an hour away to visit a newly built house that uses advanced building techniques and eco-friendly materials to achieve remarkable energy efficiency.
38–11	"Underground Energy"	December 8, 2016
The homeowners have always wanted to remove a service pole at the front of their property. The electric company has finally given them permission to bury the service from down the street. Today Jimmy McLaughlin's crew and electrician Scott Caron start the process. At the front of the house, Norm helps Charlie build the flared porch columns. They use computer pre-cut plywood to make the curved shapes. Months of construction work has left the landscape around the house a total disaster. Kevin finds Roger rebuilding the yard starting with laying a new brick patio. First they look at different pattern options, then, once the area is prepped, they start laying out the brick. The kitchen cabinets were fabricated at a shop in Maine. Today they are delivered to the project. Kevin meets the installer, Erik Frey, to watch his one-man process for installation. The architect calls for decorative half timbers and stucco to accent the front gables that were previously shingled. PVC has been chosen for its resiliency. The trick for Tommy is to properly flash the decorative pieces. Kevin helps Tommy with the installation.
38–12	"Changes Start to Show"	January 28, 2017
The exterior trim detail is complete and now it's time to shingle the rest of the house. Tommy is using pre-primed red cedar shingles with a 5-inch reveal. Inside, homeowner Emily and interior designer Jill Goldberg meet Donna Boerner, an in-home stylist, who will help them figure out what kind of window treatment works best for each window. Looking at various types of shades, they work their way through the rooms. Down in the basement, it's time to start installing the radiant floor tubing in the tracks under the existing old floor. In the living room, Mark McCullough repairs the grand fireplace. He repoints the loose bricks and carefully mends the decorative clay mantel using new pieces that were precast from a mold taken from an unbroken part of the mantel. Outside, it's time to build the back deck coming out the side door. Tommy and Norm frame it up.
38–13	"Decorative Touches Make the Difference"	February 4, 2017
There are many new decorative elements on the outside of the house - including a small roof detail supported by two brackets on the side of the house. Tommy assembles the roof on the ground first, doubling up the fascia for extra support. After he installs the second bracket, a lift helps to raise the roof into place. Upstairs on the second floor, Emily and painter Rosemary Dewees introduce Kevin to the technique of Lazure painting – a watercolor style of painting interior walls. Using multiple brushes and buckets, Kevin finds that it's not as easy as it looks. The beautiful front door has seen better days. The homeowners ask master restorer Wayne Towle for help refinishing the oak veneer. Kevin visits his shop to see how it's done. Downstairs, Tommy installs wood paneling in a corner of the living room that once housed a bookshelf. Even though it's being painted white, he uses solid oak to match the existing wood grain paneling. Outside, Roger plants screening trees that Emily and landscape architect Kim Turner selected earlier in the season..
38–14	"Shiplap for a Ship Shape House"	February 11, 2017
Everyone is covering their walls with shiplap. Homeowners Emily and Nick love it too and want to finish their third floor with it. Kevin finds Tommy installing shiplap in Nick's office. Outside, the landscape plan calls for a walkway from the front porch stairs down to the street. It will consist of brick pavers and granite steps. Kevin helps Roger's crew lay the second set of steps, using reclaimed granite from a New England bridge site. The marble slabs that we saw being quarried in Vermont have made their way down to the shop of Roberto Martinez. Roberto works with Emily to find the best piece of the slab for the kitchen island and then he goes to work cutting it. Back at the house, Emily makes her final decision on the oak paneling in the living room. Originally, she and Nick wanted to refinish the paneling. Then they decided to paint it white. Now Emily and designer Jill Goldberg meet with painter Mauro Henrique to review the paneling once more after the old finish has been stripped off. In the new family room, mason Mark McCullough builds the cast stone mantel surrounding the new fireplace. The decorative mantel was fabricated in Texas and shipped to the house in pieces. Mark and Kevin put the pieces together.
38–15	"Details Make the House Beautiful"	February 18, 2017
The journey of the Vermont marble continues from the cave to the counters. Richard watches as fabricator Roberto Martinez and his crew install the largest piece of marble at the kitchen island. Nothing says New England like a fieldstone wall. Kim, our landscape architect, calls for one that starts in the front yard and bends down along the driveway. Kevin finds Roger and his team laying the first giant stones for the wall. There is much more involved than just stacking rocks. Upstairs, Kevin finds Mark Pehrson hanging textured wallpaper over a wall that contains a secret door. What was once the master bedroom closet has now been switched to an upstairs foyer closet, but the homeowners want to cover it with a door that blends with the wall. In the basement, Richard looks at the finished radiant floor heating as well as a new state of the art air conditioning and supplemental heating system. The mechanical room wall is well organized and all hot water pipes, valves and pumps are labeled for the homeowners' reference. Fresh air ventilation is needed in the super tight space and Richard explains how the system works. Finally, the dog gets her own door as Tommy and Kevin install an extra-large dog door in an exterior wall of the mudroom. Soleil stops by to give it a try.
38–16	"An Arts & Craft for the Ages"	February 25, 2017
The Arts and Crafts house in Arlington is at completion and the guys come to take a last look and celebrate with the homeowners. Kevin and Tommy arrive at the new entrance where the old Silver Maple tree and telephone pole once stood. Kevin tours the front yard with Roger and landscape architect Kim Turner. Kim points out the new plantings in the front yard and all the hardscape that Roger and his crew have worked hard to finish. Meanwhile Tommy goes around the back to meet Norm and look at the three-story exterior addition. They reflect on how the addition was designed and built to look like it was always there. Inside, Kevin looks at the refurbished front door with homeowner Emily. The foyer ceiling has been covered with an embossed paper made of linseed to give it a decorative feeling. Emily points out other updates and they check out a new stair runner being installed on the front stairs. In the dining room, paneling has been added to the walls and an Arts and Crafts style wallpaper is above it. But the biggest change is the beautiful new oak pantry cabinets that replace what was once the outdated galley kitchen. The cabinets have a pass-through that connects to the dining room so that glassware and dishes can be accessed from both sides. Richard heads upstairs to the second floor and meets homeowner Nick. With the new addition, the entrance to the master bedroom was changed to allow for a suite with two closets, the bedroom, and a spacious new bathroom. Richard looks at the new technology in the bathroom – the shower, bathtub, and toilet all have control panels for a variety of functions. Norm finds Emily putting the finishing touches in her daughter's room. Not much was changed in there except for a special wall painting style similar to watercolors. They head up to the third floor and look at the new craft/play space that the addition allowed. Originally the idea was to move the third floor
The Detroit House
38–17	"Rebuilding Motor City"	April 1, 2017
Kevin introduces the city of Detroit and describes some of its history. He meets journalist Stephen Henderson in front of his childhood home, and learns about how the city and its neighborhoods came upon hard times. Kevin pulls up to the project house and meets Frank and Tamiko Polk, as well as Frank's mom Carolyn, in the front yard. He heads inside with Tamiko and Carolyn to tour the first and second floor. Frank finds Tommy in the back yard, and they assess some of the repairs needed, including repointing the brickwork and rebuilding the front stairs. Richard shows Frank some of the plumbing issues in the basement, and then Scott makes suggestions for upgrading the electricity. Frank and Kevin start demo on the roof by pulling up three layers of shingles.
38–18	"Ready for Rehab"	April 8, 2017
Kevin meets Detroit's Mayor, Mike Duggan, to learn about the city's efforts to eliminate blight and revitalize the neighborhoods. Kevin meets Land Bank Executive Craig Fahle, who shows him around an abandoned home in the Grandmont Rosedale neighborhood. Through a program called Rehabbed & Ready, the city plans to renovate the property and sell it to a family who plans to stay. After the mounds of trash and abandoned belongings are removed from the house, Kevin meets general contractor Tom Abbott and lead contractor Darrick Scruggs, who will manage the renovation. Back at the Russell Woods project, Scott Caron meets Wes Kasperski, who is installing an alarm system to keep the house protected during renovation. Due to a unique ceiling design in the study, proper insulation is a challenge. Frank works with Tommy and Kevin to blow in new insulation from the roof.
38–19	"Peering Down the Rehab Rabbit Hole"	April 15, 2017
At the Russell Woods project, Richard snakes a camera down the main plumbing stack to rule out any major blockages to the street. Frank asks Tommy for help with the leaky parapet at the front of the house. They find the parapet is filled with dirt. After removing it all, they use a rubber roofing material to properly seal the roof and prevent further leaks. Kevin heads to nearby Dearborn to tour the sprawling estate of a famous automaker. After decades of wear and tear by various owners, the mansion is finally getting a much deserved makeover, using preservation techniques to preserve the history throughout the home. Back at the house, Kevin and Tommy work with Frank and his friends to demo the kitchen walls and investigate whether a beam is needed to open up the room. At the Grandmont Rosedale project, a large tree looms over the house, with a root system that threatens to compromise the foundation. Kevin speaks with removal contractor Rick, who explains the process of taking it down.
38–20	"Windows of Detroit"	April 22, 2017
At the Grandmont Rosedale project, Kevin tours the demo on the house, and then meets electrician Lenny Rodriguez to learn about his electrical plan. Back in Russell Woods, Tommy teaches Tamiko, Monet and Christian techniques to remove all the peeling paint in the living room. Richard and Frank begin rough plumbing repairs in the basement using PEX tubing. Tommy shows Kevin the issues with the framing around the leaded stained glass windows in the living room as glass artist Ann Baxter begins the repairs. Richard traces the history of Motown through the Detroit neighborhoods, then visits the studio where it all began.
38–21	"Plumbing Road Trip"	April 29, 2017
At the Russell Woods project, Tommy repairs crumbling decorative molding with a plastic replica created by a 3D printer. Frank and Tamiko head to Kohler, Wisconsin to look at plumbing fixtures, while Richard gets a tour of the nearby factory. Back at the house, Richard and Frank repair some compromised joists in the upstairs bathroom. Tommy teaches Frank and his friends how to install kitchen ceiling strapping, and then Kevin heads to the project in Grandmont Rosedale neighborhood to see the efforts to repair the foundation.
38–22	"Fixing the Fascia"	May 6, 2017
At the Grandmont Rosedale project, a new exterior wall goes up, from the inside. In Russell Woods, Scott Caron and local electrician Shane Masters rough-in new kitchen wiring. Richard finds Joe Burke installing a brand new HVAC system. Richard then heads to Flint, MI to learn about the ongoing crisis that has residents without clean tap water. Back at the house, Tommy, Frank and local contractor Josh Engle install more substantial fascia in preparation for new gutters.
38–23	"A Mason Steps Up"	May 13, 2017
At the Russell Woods project, Tommy uses a clever fix for some damaged oak flooring in the living room. Frank and Tamiko meet with Jerusha Kaffine, a local kitchen designer, to see her plan. Mark McCullough joins the crew in Detroit to repair the front steps, and then new gutters go up. Kevin visits a nearby pottery to see how they've been making tile for a century. Then he heads to the Grandmont-Rosedale neighborhood to show the progress.
38–24	"Stained Glass Revival"	May 18, 2017
Kevin stops by the Grandmont Rosedale project to find the kitchen tile and cabinets installed. He watches as the granite countertops go in. Back in Russell Woods, Tommy works with Josh and Frank to reinstall all of the restored leaded glass bay windows. Now that drywall is up in the kitchen, Frank is ready to install the wood grain tile on the floor. First Josh puts down a decoupling membrane underlayment that supports an electric wire heating system. Kevin and Roger explore urban farming in Detroit. First they visit a resident who has purchased the lots surrounded her property to grow her own food. Next, a neighborhood farm that helps feed the immediate neighborhood residents who live in a food desert. Finally, a farm closer to the city with an apprenticeship program that provides area residents with job and education opportunities. Back at the house, Roger installs a drywell at the front and back of the house in order to move rain water away from the house and prevent it from getting into the basement. Tommy, Frank, Josh and Kevin team up to install the cabinets in the kitchen.
38–25	"Going Old School for Tile and Molding"	May 25, 2017
In Russell Woods, Kevin finds Frank and Tamiko prepping the guest room walls. Their kids join in to begin painting. Kevin finds sod farmer Mike Thompson in the front yard, planting some low maintenance plants under the bay windows and laying sod across the rest of the front yard. Tommy repairs decorative crown molding in the living room by making his own template from a putty knife. Kevin and Contractor Josh Engle work together to install plumbing fixtures in the upstairs bathroom, starting with the toilet. Tommy and Frank work together to install a new interior door in an existing opening. Kevin finds tile installer Roger Dutcher giving the fireplace a much needed facelift, using handcrafted tile from a 100-year-old pottery only a few miles away. At the Rehabbed & Ready project, Darrick gives Kevin a tour of the nearly complete house. Once the carpet is installed on the 2nd floor, doors are re-hung and the paint is touched up, the house will be ready to go on the market.
38–26	"Rebirth in Detroit"	June 1, 2017
Kevin and Tommy pull up to the completed Russell Woods, recalling their time in the city and the restoration efforts they've witnessed. Frank meets Tommy out front to review the exterior changes to the house. Tamiko shows Kevin the new living room, dining room and den, featuring the restored bay windows, refinished floors, new fireplace surround, fresh paint and inviting furniture. Richard gives Kevin an overview of the improvements to the mechanicals in the basement, which had been ravaged by thieves. A new furnace and water heater will keep the house warm and cool, and a whole house water filtration system will keep the drinking water clean. Franks shows Tommy the changes to the upstairs: 2 bedrooms and an office featuring fresh paint and beautiful woods floors; an office with an attached sun porch that will be the perfect place to relax; and a spa-like bathroom with a soaking tub, rain shower and dual vanity. Kevin stops by the Rehabbed & Ready project during its first open house. Land Bank Executive Craig Fahle discusses some of the logistics of selling the property, and Kevin interviews prospective homebuyers to get their feedback. Back in Russell Woods, Kevin and Tamiko tour the brand new kitchen. The whole crew and those who helped along the way join in to celebrate Frank and Tamiko's beautifully restored home.

== Season 39 (2017–18) ==
- Kevin O'Connor's fifteenth season as the host.

No. in season	Title	Original release date
Newton Generation NEXT House
39–01	"A House for the NEXT Generation"	October 5, 2017
A woman inherits her childhood home, but she and her husband make changes to accommodate their children and in-laws; Mike Rowe discusses the need for skilled tradespeople.
39–02	"A Few Good Landscapers"	October 12, 2017
New foundation is poured as the house is readied for demolition; roses and lilacs are saved before demolition begins; mold is found in the basement.
39–03	"Generation Next Arrives"	October 19, 2017
The crew installs a beam to support a new opening in the kitchen. Also: the homeowners select finishes and the apprentices work on the front porch.
39–04	"Construction Gets A Jumpstart"	October 26, 2017
A new floor is built. Also: Richard, the homeowners and the designer hunt for an old clawfoot tub; Tom shows the apprentices how to level the front porch and build a hip roof; and Kevin visits Baltimore to learn about a training program.
39–05	"All Decked Out"	November 2, 2017
The apprentices learn the basics of framing a deck, while around the corner the chimney is demo-ed. The homeowners work with their interior designer to create a custom pattern for the tile floor. The flue for the wood-burning stove is installed.
39–06	"This Old House University"	November 11, 2017
The apprentices frame a wall in the master bedroom, build a drain stack for the master bath and lay decking on the front porch. Meanwhile, the homeowners visit their kitchen cabinet designer.
39–07	"Approaching Half Way"	November 16, 2017
Dining room flooring is used to make a barn door; an uninsulated crawl space is found after breaking through the basement wall; the garage floor gets radiant heat; and the front porch gets new columns. Also: Roger teaches a horticulture class in the field.
39–08	"Duct Dynasty"	December 28, 2017
While the apprentices get a lesson in roofing, Kevin visits Rhode Island to watch how an elaborate Chippendale railing is put together. A new slab of concrete goes in the basement to keep the moisture out. Richard shows how ductwork is put together.
39–09	"Tommy's Flair For Flares"	January 4, 2018
Tommy builds a shower seat made of foam. Richard connects steel piping. Tommy teaches how to install replacement windows. Tommy shows Kevin and Joe how he makes a jig for the exterior shingled flair detail.
39–10	"Time For Trim"	January 11, 2018
Granite goes down for wood stove. Nathan installs the porch ceiling. Kevin visits a home in Rhode Island where the exterior trim is pine. Richard reviews the placement of components at mechanical wall. Mauro shows how to repair holes in old plaster.
39–11	"Homeowners Pitch In"	January 18, 2018
Tommy trims the rough interior columns. Liz makes a stained glass window. Kevin tours a flooring factory in Pennsylvania. Richard visits a voc-tech school plumbing class. Norm shows Kevin a few new tricks he's learned for installing stair treads.
39–12	"Salvage Helps The Bottom Line"	November 25, 2018
Norm installs an old door in the hallway. Roger watches a stone wall being installed in pre-made sections. Kevin visits a career day for the trades. In Rhode Island, twin built-in beds are made. Tommy re-installs a corner cabinet in the dining room.
39–13	"Graduation Day"	February 1, 2018
Roger explains why some preventative tree work is needed. Homeowner Liz gets a lesson on tiling. The original balustrade with white-painted bannisters and black-painted railing and newel post is found to be walnut. A master restorer strips the black paint from the walnut and strips paint from the bricks and cast brick molding of a fireplace. The apprentices graduate after 10 weeks of hard work.
39–14	"Homeowner Going The Distance"	February 8, 2018
Liz helps Norm lay composite decking. Charlie makes exterior decorative brackets. Kevin watches quartz countertop installation. Roger's crew makes a new front walk. Liz puts in her stained glass window. Dry wells are needed for storm water runoff.
39–15	"Finishing Up In Newton"	February 15, 2018
Tommy and Charlie install a fireback on a kitchen wall. Roger returns the roses and lilacs he saved and brings in some new plants. The island countertop goes on. Kevin watches a crew install a garage door. The wood stove finally arrives.
39–16	"Move In Day"	February 28, 2018
Kevin tours the renovated house with the homeowners. What was once Liz' childhood home has been transformed into a house for the next generation. Their kids and Joe's parents arrive to check it out.
The Charleston Houses 2018
39–17	"Southern Charm"	March 29, 2018
Charleston, South Carolina, is the second town for the 39th season of This Old House. The TOH crew renovate and restore two historic homes in the city, working with new apprentices to get the job done. The apprentices come from the American College of the Building Arts, also located in Charleston, the only school in the U.S. that offers a bachelor's degree in traditional building trades.
39–18	"Demo Time"	April 7, 2018
39–19	"Brick and Mortar"	April 14, 2018
39–20	"Southern Roots"	April 21, 2018
39–21	"Good Wood"	April 28, 2018
39–22	"Rough Plumbing"	May 5, 2018
39–23	"Smithies"	May 12, 2018
39–24	"Rainbow Row"	May 19, 2018
39–25	"Raise the Pergola"	May 26, 2018
39–26	"Singular Single House"	June 2, 2018

== Season 40 (2018–19) ==
- Kevin O'Connor's sixteenth season as the host.
- This Old House celebrates its 40th anniversary.
- This is the last season to be produced by WGBH-TV in Boston, which had produced it since This Old House debuted in 1979.

No. in season	Title	Original release date
The Jamestown Net Zero House
40–01	"The Net-Zero Bungalow"	October 6, 2018
This Old House kicks off its 40th anniversary season, as we head to a century-old New England cottage in Jamestown, Rhode Island, to restore the home's charm while also making it energy efficient. Homeowners Dana and Donald have a net-zero energy goal for the new home for their family of four, with state-of-the-art energy efficiency and environmental sensitivity at top of mind. For the first half of our 40th season, Sweenor Builders will be renovating the current structure as well as creating an addition that will double the size of the home. The biggest challenge? Making the two halves behave as a single, uniformly efficient and healthy whole.
40–02	"Net Zero From the Ground Up"	October 13, 2018
This Old House is headed to a century-old New England cottage in Jamestown, Rhode Island, to restore the home's charm while also making it energy efficient. Homeowners Dana and Donald have a net-zero energy goal for the new home for their family of four, with state-of-the-art energy efficiency and environmental sensitivity at top of mind. For the first half of our 40th season, Sweenor Builders will be renovating the current structure as well as creating an addition that will double the size of the home. The biggest challenge? Making the two halves behave as a single, uniformly efficient and healthy whole.
40–03	"HVAC of the Future"	October 20, 2018
Jeff shows Kevin how he's framing the net zero house, and Richard demonstrates heat loss and gain to design a balanced HVAC system.
40–04	"A Charleston Family House is Reborn"	October 27, 2018
New apprentices join the team in Rhode Island as the roof goes up. The homeowners visit a cabinet showroom to finalize their plans. The house gets sheathed. It's the finish line at Judith's house in Charleston. Kevin and Tom take the grand tour.
40–05	"Ramp Up the R Value"	November 3, 2018
Insulation is crucial to a net zero house. Kevin finds Jeff and the apprentices starting the work. Dana shops for efficient yet decorative lighting. Tom and Jeff work with the apprentices to build false rafter tails and then they install them.
40–06	"Net Zero Blanket"	November 10, 2018
Roof insulation is next step at the net zero house. Richard tours the basement of The Breakers in Newport. Kevin meets Congressman Norcross at the house, who is also an electrician. Apprentices install and flash windows.
40–07	"Modern Barn Raising"	November 17, 2018
The electrician installs a load center. Tom and apprentices put up cedar roof shingles. Kevin and Jeff add insulation to the basement. Tom shows apprentices how to block behind walls with future cabinets and wall fixtures. The barn gets raised.
40–08	"Air Tight House"	January 5, 2019
Sealing the home against air leaks; reviewing the pre-drywall checklist; landscape plan; fabricating pieces for porch columns and rails; shingles are applied as the last layer of the exterior wall system.
40–09	"Designing Their Dream Home"	January 12, 2019
Reviewing design samples; heating pump; applying stone veneer; installing a wall-hung toilet tank; building a vanity.
40–10	"Powering Net Zero"	January 19, 2019
The difference between blueboard and drywall; sizing a solar array; installing a wood ceiling; installing a generator; a boat building school.
40–11	"Roger's Nod to Sod"	January 26, 2019
Sod farm; HVAC installation; adding a gas fireplace to the living room; attaching screens to the side porch; digging a well.
40–12	"Energy Saving Installations"	February 2, 2019
Induction cooking. Solar panel and unique lattice installs. A lesson in ERV. Landscaping.
40–13	"Net Zero Comes Together"	February 9, 2019
The net zero house is complete; touring the yard, barn and upstairs; checking out the main floor; reviewing mechanicals.
Brookline Mid-century Modern House
40–14	"Mid-century Modern Makeover"	February 16, 2019
Renovation plans for a 1957 mid-century modern house in need of a total overhaul; demolition begins.
40–15	"Next Generation Demolition"	February 23, 2019
Asbestos and tree removal; a visit to the first "This Old House" project in Dorchester, Mass.
40–16	"Apprentices in Sill School"	March 30, 2019
Laying a sill on a new foundation; scoping the sewer; starting a design plan to create a sleek, modern space
40–17	"Beam Me Up, Tommy"	April 4, 2019
The foundation of the house has no footings, so Mark McCullough pours a buttress. Kevin visits the 2001 Manchester by the Sea project. Back at the house, Richard solves a ductwork puzzle while Kevin and Tommy install a PVC trim overhang.
40–18	"Norm Revisits a Skylight"	April 11, 2019
Kevin meets electrician Heath Eastman to learn about in-counter outlets. Tommy visits former apprentice Nathan Gilbert to see what he's been up to over the past year. Back at the house, Norm teaches Carly how to frame a skylight.
40–19	"Stone Cold Pavers"	April 18, 2019
Jenn and the homeowners select pavers for hardscape. Tommy and Norm install a skylight in the bathroom, while the sewer line and water main are completely replaced out front. The original foundation is also repaired.
40–20	"Eight Is Enough Stairways"	April 25, 2019
Tommy teaches Kevin how to calculate the riser height for a set of stairs. The foundation is insulated with a DIY foam system. Radiant heat is installed, and Norm and Richard head to Santa Fe to visit the project they did 30 years ago.
40–21	"Can We Cantilever"	May 2, 2019
Tommy shows Kevin the careful process of installing rafters for a cantilevered roof. Inside, Richard solves a venting problem for the kitchen sink before tackling the AC ductwork puzzle. Later, Tommy and Kevin install snow cleats on the roof.
40–22	"What's the Miter with the Corner"	May 10, 2019
Mark McCullough rebuilds a century old Puddingstone wall. Tommy and Kevin revisit the 2005 Cambridge modern project. Electrician Heath Eastman installs trimless LED recessed lights. Large tanks are installed under the driveway for rain water runoff.
40–23	"See Glass"	May 16, 2019
Kevin travels to the Midwest to see the manufacturing of plate glass and windows. Back in Brookline, Mauro teaches Kevin some cold weather painting tricks. Radiant heat is installed under the driveway, while the patio is installed in the front.
40–24	"Attack of the Giant Tile"	May 23, 2019
Mark Ferrante lays giant porcelain tile in the main living spaces of the house. Kevin and Richard head to sunny Key West to visit the 20th anniversary project. Back in Brookline, a hanging retro fireplace and modern kitchen cabinets are installed.
40–25	"Finally Finishes"	June 20, 2019
Doors are hung, floors are going down; it's time for finishing touches. Kevin finds Shawn McEvoy and his team installing a closet organization system in the master bedroom. Our apprentice Carly's next lesson is installing a modern baseboard. Her teacher: the master Tom Silva. The master bath has a unique drain in the wall. Kevin gets Mark Ferrante and Kevin Bilo to show him how magnets create the illusion of a hidden drain. The flooring chosen by our homeowners comes pre-finished, but not the stair treads, and there are a lot of stairs in this house. Tommy helps our restoration expert Wayne Towle stain the treads to match the floors. More last-minute details include hardware for the interior doors. Kevin finds Sunil at a local hardware store where Daniel Heyligers helps sort through the options. A challenge for any cabinet installer is to make the bathroom cabinets appear to float on the wall. Kevin finds our former apprentice, Nathan, working with his father in the master bath.
40–26	"Taking Modern Back to the Future"	June 27, 2019
The lackluster mid-century box is a modern marvel once again. Kevin and Tommy arrive to assess the transformation of the exterior of the house. After using the new front entry and walking through the mudroom, they take in the heart of the home, opened up to allow for a spacious working kitchen and eating area with clear sightlines into the living room. Homeowners Sunil and Neha celebrate the high ceilings, abundance of glass, balconies and hanging gas fireplace. Sunil takes Tommy upstairs to the bedroom level, where they now have a master suite with ample clothes storage and a bathroom with sleek, modern accents. In their daughter Nisa's room, installer Zak is finishing up his work on the motorized window shades. In the basement, Richard shows Kevin the multiple mechanical and electrical closets, laundry room, gym area and garage. Charlie joins the discussion to discuss the heated driveway to help melt snow and prevent flooding. On the lower living level, Sunil and Tommy tour the guest suite, complete with a kitchenette, bathroom and private entrance. Outside, Jenn shows Kevin the new patio with sitting wall, and explains their plans to develop proper drainage for rain. Back inside, Sunil and Neha show Kevin around their dining area, pantry and kitchen, where panels hide appliances and a custom hood adorns the gas and induction cooktops. Everyone joins to celebrate the completion of the project.
