= List of This Old House episodes (seasons 1–10) =

This Old House is an American home improvement media brand with television shows, a magazine and a website, ThisOldHouse.com. The brand is headquartered in Stamford, CT. The television series airs on the American television station Public Broadcasting Service (PBS) and follows remodeling projects of houses over a number of weeks.

Season	Episodes	Originally released	
Season	Episodes	First released	Last released
1	13	January 1, 1979	June 30, 1979
2	27	January 1, 1981	September 28, 1981
3	13	January 1, 1982	May 1, 1982
4	26	May 15, 1982	December 7, 1982
5	26	October 1, 1983	March 24, 1984
6	26	October 5, 1984	March 29, 1985
7	26	October 10, 1985	April 3, 1986
8	26	October 16, 1986	April 9, 1987
9	26	October 1, 1987	March 24, 1988
10	26	September 1, 1988	February 23, 1989
11	26	January 1, 1989	September 15, 1989
12	26	September 1, 1990	March 22, 1991
13	26	September 5, 1991	March 19, 1992
14	26	January 1, 1992	September 15, 1992
15	26	September 2, 1993	March 24, 1994
16	26	January 1, 1994	March 22, 1995
17	26	September 3, 1995	March 23, 1996
18	26	September 28, 1996	March 22, 1997
19	26	September 27, 1997	March 21, 1998
20	26	September 26, 1998	March 20, 1999
21	26	September 25, 1999	March 18, 2000
22	26	September 23, 2000	March 17, 2001
23	26	September 22, 2001	March 16, 2002
24	26	October 10, 2002	April 3, 2003
25	26	October 11, 2003	April 1, 2004
26	26	October 9, 2004	April 2, 2005
27	26	October 6, 2005	March 30, 2006
28	26	October 5, 2006	March 29, 2007
29	26	October 4, 2007	March 27, 2008
30	26	October 2, 2008	March 26, 2009
31	26	October 10, 2009	April 3, 2010
32	26	October 7, 2010	March 31, 2011
33	26	October 6, 2011	March 29, 2012
34	26	October 4, 2012	March 28, 2013
35	26	October 5, 2013	May 3, 2014
36	26	October 4, 2014	May 30, 2015
37	26	October 3, 2015	May 28, 2016
38	26	October 1, 2016	June 3, 2017
39	26	October 7, 2017	June 2, 2018
40	26	October 6, 2018	June 27, 2019
41	26	October 5, 2019	May 31, 2020
42	26	October 4, 2020	June 6, 2021

Note: Episodes are listed in the original broadcast order

== Season 1 (1979) ==
- Bob Vila's first season as the host.
- This is the first season to have Fats Waller's "Louisiana Fairy Tale" as the original This Old House theme song.

No. in season	Title	Original release date
The Dorchester House
1–01	"A Tour of the House"	January 1, 1979
The series premiere opens with Bob Vila welcoming the viewers to This Old House. The series will reveal the many steps involved in rehabbing an old house into a family home. Rehabbing is a combination of restoring and renovating, from demolition to decoration. This single-family residence was built around 1860 in a style that was very popular in the Victorian era. Real estate appraiser John Hewitt helps Bob appraise the house. They survey the condition of the exterior, including the mansard roof, clapboards, windows, gutters, garage, and foundation. They assess whether or not the features are worth repairing or replacing. The house is situated on a quarter acre of land next to Saint Peter's church, which was built in 1870, and across the street from the first meetinghouse of Boston. Thirty years ago, the owner, a doctor, built a new entrance, which is in good shape. Inside, they look at the condition of each room. The ceilings are in poor shape and will need to be replaced. The fireplaces can be cleaned and repaired. The woodwork all matches in the old entryway and can be kept. The kitchen is a good size but will need a complete makeover. The bedrooms on the second floor are large and sunny. The bathroom is a disaster. The third floor is partly redone, and a caretaker will occupy it while the home is being rehabbed. John appraises the home for $16,000 to $17,000 in its current condition. Real estate broker John Crosby describes the home's biggest selling points as well as the weaknesses. Down in the basement, John Hewett assesses the condition of the copper pipes and a crawl space under the kitchen. The electrical box needs a major update for safety. The heating system needs to be replaced. Note: This is the first episode of This Old House where Fats Waller's "Louisiana Fairy Tale" is the theme song.
1–02	"House History and Kitchen Plans"	February 1, 1979
Bob Vila talks with Norm Abram, who makes his first appearance on This Old House, talking about rot in the eaves. The gutters were improperly installed and allowed water to get into the house. The brackets are also water damaged because water got into the soffit. On the roof, boards near the edge will need to be replaced, and new shingles must be added. Bonnie Shatsky Hammer, This Old House associate producer, discusses the history of the house. John Parks originally owned the land in 1818. The house ownership traces back to 1861, to Eliza T. Clapp, a writer. The Clapp family developed a large portion of Dorchester. In 1932, during the depression, the house was taken over by the bank. In 1937, the bank sold it to Arthur T. Ronen, a prominent surgeon, who lived there until 1965. Bonnie and Bob look at an old image of the house and determine when renovations were completed. Back outside, Bob takes a look at the exterior demolition work. Inside, Bob tells us about the plans for the kitchen. When planning a kitchen it is important to take into account traffic patterns and workspace area. He proposes combining the kitchen with the existing dining room, and turning one of the parlor rooms into a formal dining room. We take a look at the blueprints. Ross McDonald, an energy auditor, talks about the gross energy deficiencies of the building. He recommends adding insulation and closing leaks. The main problems are heat loss and a lack of heat supply. Fifty percent of the heat produced is being lost. Ross recommends speaking with a heat engineer and retrofitting for energy efficiency. There is a lot of demolition to be done at this old house. Bob talks about renting a dumpster for a large demo job. To do the demo work yourself, Bob recommends a few key tools: gloves, hat, facemask, claw hammer, sledgehammer, flat bar, and a crow bar. Bob tackles the demolition of the small downstairs powder room.
1–03	"Frozen Pipes and a New Kitchen Wall"	February 15, 1979
Bob talks about the demolition work that has taken place and the problems they have encountered so far. The roof has significant rot damage and will cost more time and money. He explains the plan to make the porch look like it did originally 100 years ago—before the doctor's office entrance was added. As a guide, they can look at a house across the street that is a similar style and was built at the same time. That house gives them an idea of what a simple façade the project house once had. Another problem has been freezing pipes due to the cold weather in Boston. The house is six feet higher than the street level and the water main. The plumber hasn't been able to dislodge the ice in the pipes, so they might have to dig down into the ground. A lead pipe will have to be replaced. Bob goes inside to look at the progress of the demolition work. The "box" or the doctor's office entrance will eventually be removed and a new wall and window will replace it. All the demolition inside is completed. The only structural problem encountered is underneath the upstairs bathroom. The indoor plumbing ruined the rafters underneath it. In the kitchen area, Bob shows us where a new first floor bathroom will be located. He shows us where a wall will be removed between the kitchen and current dining room to create a family kitchen dining area. The kitchen is full of problems. It was an addition to the house and has structural issues with the walls, including surface rot on the studs. The previous exterior door will be closed off and they are creating a new door. Temporary roof supports were put in place to support the roof while they remove the wall. Norm Abram and the crew take the wall down and dump them. Bob takes a look at the new wall that has already been built. Norm and the crew move the new wall into place. A new wooden deck will eventually be installed in the area outside the kitchen. Douglass Shand-Tucci, an expert on Victorian architecture, talks more about the history of Dorchester, Massachusetts. We learn about the meetinghouse and St. Peter's church. The project house is situated between the two landmarks. Upstairs, Bob discusses the plan to convert the current bathroom into a master bathroom. They will also add a bathroom and laundry room into an existing bedroom that is too small to function as a bedroom.
1–04	"Insulation and Plumbing"	February 28, 1979
Bob shares the updates on the changes to the renovation plans. Bob talks with Dave Novice, insulation contractor with Con-Serv, about the insulation plan. They have already insulated the roof and today they are blowing in cellulose insulation into the cavities in the Mansard roof area. They take a look at the machine that will be used and the insulation material—recycled newsprint. Rodents and insects do not like this material because of the print and chemicals used on it. Cellulose is a better buy than fiberglass. The soffit area will remain empty so they will need to install midget vents to move moisture out. Bob makes his way down to the kitchen to discuss the plan changes. All the walls in the kitchen addition are now new. They must add more support to the ceiling where the old archway used to be. This changes the original plan slightly and now the fridge and stove areas will be swapped. He shows where a kitchen island will now be built. Bob knocks down a piece of a wall, creating a doorway that will connect the kitchen family area to a new formal dining area. We move on into the living room where Norm shows us a new wall they built and how the old wall is out of alignment. They move outside to see how the mismatched walls are very visible outside. Norm shows Bob how they will use a pulley to crank the old wall back into position, about an inch and a half. Ron Trethewey shows Bob how they need to remove the old furnace and what the new heating system will be: a gas fire boiler. They look at the new cast-iron, energy-saving unit. The whole house will be forced hot water with gas. There will be four heating zones in the house instead of only one. The plumbing crew knocks the old, heavy boiler out of place and it will be broken up in pieces to be removed. Ron shows Bob where a utility sink will be added. They look at the pipes and how they will need to rearrange the plumbing and install new PVC piping. Bob and Ron move upstairs to the kitchen and look at the area where the new half bath will be. There will be no window in this half bath, so it will need a light fan unit with a vent to the outside. In the kitchen, the sink and dishwasher will be on the outside wall under a window and above an unheated crawl space. Bob is worried about frozen pipes, but Ron shows him how the water piping will be protected outside the finished wall. They also discuss the water supply needed for the fridge and the gas line for the new range. Ron also looks at the plans for the upstairs bathrooms. There will be a completely new drainage system including a floor drain to protect the floor from a potential overflow on the laundry area. Ron gives an estimate of 12 days and $3,500 just for labor to complete the upstairs bathroom work.
1–05	"Leveled Ceilings and Kitchen Lighting"	March 1, 1979
Bob shares a circa-1922 to 1938 photo of the house's front exterior sent in by a former resident. It shows that several elements considered original were added on later, including a triple window and bathroom window. Inside, John explains why a plumbing waystack won't fit inside living room walls, as planned. Bob shows how an additional coat closet will hide the pipe and provide storage space for guests. Then, Bob demonstrates how the crew will level uneven framing before installing new ceilings. Bob walks through the layout of kitchen elements, lighting, and wiring. Then, he heads outside to help Norm and Greg replace an old bulkhead doorframe with a new waterproof, steel frame. Bob answers questions from reader mail.
1–06	"Heating Plan, Kitchen Skylight"	March 15, 1979
Blue board and cast-iron bathtubs are delivered with the help of a boom truck. Norm shows Bob weatherproofing techniques on the mansard roof, including a metal drip edge and rolled roofing to prevent ice buildup beneath shingles. We get a closer look at refurbished medallions and new trim along the eave line. Inside, Bob and Adam talk about plans to turn two bedroom closets into one with a pair of space saving bypass doors. Joe walks Bob through the heating plan for the house, and shows him the water heater and heating plant in the basement. Bob revisits the roof and helps Norm install an insulated skylight over the kitchen. Back inside, Bob checks up on the closet construction in the bedroom. Then Bob answers some reader mail.
1–07	"Roof Repairs, Kitchen Plaster Work"	April 1, 1979
Plasterers, roofers, and carpenters are hard at work on the jobsite. Bob visits the top-tier roof, where Dave shows him how patching a damage section of the tar-and-gravel roof saves the crew from replacing the top section of roof. He also points out that the brick chimney will be repointed instead of replaced. Bob climbs down to the kitchen roof, where Mike explains the reroofing process. In the kitchen, the blue board is installed and joints are beaded and scratched. Sal shows Bob the proper technique for plastering the walls and ceilings, and Bob gives plastering a try. Outside, Bob takes a look at the framed front porch and demonstrates installing Fir boards for the decking. He discusses options for building a foundation beneath the porch, which will be determined by budget. While he's outside, Bob explains that the old lead water line cannot be dug up with machines because of rocky soil. Instead, it will have to be hand dug and the process will require tearing up a concrete walkway and brick steps leading to the sidewalk. Back on the kitchen roof, Mike and his crew are installing the flashing, applying hot tar, and spreading gravel.
1–08	"Insulation, Historic Paint Colors"	May 1, 1979
Bob visits the brick standalone garage in an area of the yard that we haven't previously seen this season. He talks about plans to update the windows and doors. Inside the garage, he shows that there is room for a car and workshop. At the back of the house, Bob shows the existing back deck and reveals the plans for a two-level deck. Then, Dave shows Bob how the crew is removing exterior clapboards to make room for drilling holes where they will blow cellulose insulation into the bathroom wall cavity. In the crawl space beneath the kitchen, a crew member installs fiberglass batting between kitchen floor joists. That installation and a layer of polyethylene sheeting on the bare ground will keep the kitchen above dry and safe from dirt and humidity. In the kitchen, Bob admires the complete plasterwork on the walls and ceilings. Norm walks Bob through window trim installation on a kitchen window. Judy shows Bob her technique for determining original paint colors and shares her findings for the project house. Then, Bob addresses a viewer letter about safety concerns.
1–09	"Deck Foundation"	May 15, 1979
Bob tours the town of Dorchester beginning in Ronan Park, a spacious recreation area with views of Dorchester Bay. Carl drives Bob around the neighborhood to see various styles homes, including turn of the century triple decker, multi-family homes and single family Cape Codes, Victorians, and Queen Anne-style houses. Bob and Carl arrive at the Dorchester house to find that work on the deck and its foundation is underway. Norm explains how the deck supports are built and the concrete footings are poured. The wood framework for the two-level deck is just beginning. Bob heads to the front of the home to discuss how the crew safely strips lead paint from the exterior of the project house, outlining the precautions that need to be taken. He demonstrated how to scrap and sand the paint from the wood clapboards. Inside, we take a look at how the old window sashes are being repaired. In the bathroom Paul is finished the installation for the master bathroom tub surround. He introduces us to an alternative to ceramic wall tile and his brother Tom demonstrates the installation. Back outside, Norm cuts a stringer for the deck stairs.
1–10	"Exterior Plainning"	May 30, 1979
In the tenth week of construction new clapboards are going up on the house exterior in place of damages ones. Norm installs red cedar boards and explains how to replace split boards. Bob joins Phyllis Anderson, a landscape designer, on a tour of the exterior lot. They determine which existing trees and shrubs can be salvaged and which need to be removed. Phyllis talks about plans to raise a wood fence around the perimeter of the grounds. Inside, new kitchen cabinets are going in. Bob walks us through the layout for the kitchen. He and Norm screw in the top row of cabinets. The Mayor of Boston, Kevin White, pays a visit to the house. He discussed taxes, crime, and home affordability in the city of Boston.
1–11	"Flooring Install"	June 1, 1979
Host Bob Vila demonstrates how to lay a parquet kitchen floor. He speaks to a marble expert about the dining room fireplace and the bathroom tile floor. A security expert shares his plans for protecting the Dorchester House.
1–12	"Adding Curb Appeal"	June 15, 1979
The house painter demonstrates how to apply primer. Host Bob Vila talks about installing an oak floor and sanding floors. A stonemason repairs the stone wall around the house, and the yard gets two new trees.
1–13	"The Finished Project"	June 30, 1979
A look at the nearly finished product, inside and out. And the finishing touches are put on the picket fence, the deck, and yard.

== Season 2 (1981) ==
- Bob Vila's second season as host.

No. in season	Title	Original release date
The Newton House
2–01	"The Newton House - 1"	January 1, 1981
Bob Vila kicks off the second season of This Old House by introducing the Bigelow House, a 19th-century hilltop home in Newton, MA, designed by Victorian architect H.H. Richardson. The challenge is to convert this abandoned structure into five modern condominium units, while preserving architectural integrity. Bob Vila talks with Norm Abram about how to achieve this balance.
2–02	"The Newton House - 2"	January 15, 1981
Bob Vila discusses plans for renovating the Barn unit - insulating, demolition and replacing broken windows.
2–03	"The Newton House - 3"	January 30, 1981
Demolition is nearly complete, and Bob Vila discusses problems uncovered: damage from carpenter ants, vandals, and rot
2–04	"The Newton House - 4"	February 1, 1981
Bob Vila discusses some of the key decisions to be made about condominium sales. Also, plans are made to install wood burning stoves in the ice house and wood house units.
2–05	"The Newton House - 5"	February 15, 1981
We begin to do some plumbing at the house, while a landscape architect shows the lay of the land, and Norm Abram pours a concrete wall
2–06	"The Newton House - 6"	February 28, 1981
The exterminator gives the house a bug check and professor John Coolidge talks about architect of the Bigelow House, H.H. Richardson.
2–07	"The Newton House - 7"	March 1, 1981
Bob Vila discusses plans for the new 5-car garage. The electrician begins wiring and we look at solar and oil heating options.
2–08	"The Newton House - 8"	March 15, 1981
Bob Vila and Norm Abram give a progress report on the house. There's a focus on preparing the house for winter with insulation and fireplace fix-ups.
2–09	"The Newton House - 9"	March 28, 1981
Bob Vila looks at radiators, windows, and lighting options.
2–10	"The Newton House - 10"	April 1, 1981
The south roof gets an ice shield and cedar shingles, the living room wall gets a layer of energy-saving polystyrene board, and the grounds get a facelift.
2–11	"The Newton House - 11"	April 15, 1981
Bob Vila looks at the wiring needs in the Barn units, looks into lathing and plastering, and talks about choosing tiles
2–12	"The Newton House - 12"	April 28, 1981
Shingling is completed on the south side of the bungalow and the lights are in place in the main house.
2–13	"The Newton House - 13"	May 1, 1981
We check on the bathroom tiling, some electrical work (lighting), a look at cabinets, and an installation of wood gutters.
2–14	"The Newton House - 14"	May 15, 1981
Bob Vila shows progress made in the house with roofing and plastering, and meets with Charlie English, who gives a lesson on the finer points of a mud job (tiling the bathroom).
2–15	"The Newton House - 15"	May 28, 1981
The crawlspace in the barn unit gets a concrete floor, we take a look at parquet flooring, we get a lesson in tile grouting, and we talk about landscaping.
2–16	"The Newton House - 16"	June 1, 1981
Our host sizes up the tree cutting clearing hob outside the Ice House unit. In the barn, he discusses the wood beam framing. Then, it's up to the main house for a look at the stairway.
2–17	"The Newton House - 17"	June 15, 1981
Bob Vila reviews plans for the interior of the Barn unit, discusses issues with flooring, has a sink installed, and looks at door repair.
2–18	"The Newton House - 18"	June 28, 1981
Bob Vila tours the Barn unit, goes over problems with the hardwood floors in the Main House, and takes a look at a selection of brass locks and hardware for the doors.
2–19	"The Newton House - 19"	July 1, 1981
Norm Abram installs unusual floor-to-ceiling triple-sash windows, Charlie the finish carpenter installs locks and door knobs, and kitchen cabinets are installed.
2–20	"The Newton House - 20"	July 15, 1981
A sun room is created, a ceramic floor is laid in the kitchen, we look at ceiling fans, and a fireplace gets a new stone face.
2–21	"The Newton House - 21"	July 28, 1981
This week, the old metal garages come down and barn lighting goes in. In the main house, it's time to install the air conditioning and kitchen window casings.
2–22	"The Newton House - 22"	August 1, 1981
Plans are made for a new garage, Norm makes a winding stairway in the Barn, a range is installed in the kitchen, and the sunroom gets a copper roof.
2–23	"The Newton House - 23"	August 15, 1981
Bob Vila takes a look at spiral staircases and a factory where they are made, we look at reproducing the original fireplace tiles, and we look some modern kitchen appliances.
2–24	"The Newton House - 24"	August 28, 1981
Bob Vila inspects custom kitchen cabinets in the Barn, checks on plaster work upstairs. Landscape architect Tom Wirth talks about brick paving and takes us on a tour of a granite quarry.
2–25	"The Newton House - 25"	September 1, 1981
A heat pump gets installed in the Barn unit, a countertop is made for a bathroom, Norm begins paneling with white cedar, and Bob takes a side trip to see the process by which the white cedar came from trees in North Carolina to paneling in the Barn.
2–26	"The Newton House - 26"	September 15, 1981
It's been four months since the last show, and Bob Vila shows us progress they have made. We look at the installation of a parquet floor and see some kitchen cabinets. An interior decorator gives advice on how to fill the space.
2–27	"The Newton House - 27"	September 28, 1981
Bob Vila opens the show outside the completed Bigelow House, as This Old House wraps up its second season.

== Season 3 (1982) ==
- Bob Vila's third season as host.

No. in season	Title	Original release date
The Woburn House
3–01	"The Woburn House - 1"	January 1, 1982
Host Bob Vila kicks off the third season of This Old House, touring a 1950 ranch-style tract house. Bob and master carpenter Norm Abram talk about the possibilities for creating space where none presently exists. And they'll take you on a tour of the neighborhood to see how other homeowners have transformed their houses from the 50s into roomier, energy-efficient homes for the 80s.
3–02	"The Woburn House - 2"	January 15, 1982
It's time to pour the footings for the sunroom/breezeway between the house and the garage. Then the house gets an energy audit and recommendations for cost-effective solutions to specific energy problems.
3–03	"The Woburn House - 3"	January 28, 1982
Host Bob Vila assesses the efficiency of This Old House's heating plant. Rich Trethewey appraises plumbing work to be done. Carpenter Norm Abram builds the framing for the sunroom/breezeway, and replaces windows.
3–04	"The Woburn House - 4"	February 1, 1982
Host Bob Vila tours the new living space. Rich Trethewey roughs in the new bath off the master bedroom, then goes outside to check on Norm Abram and the condition of the roof. Back inside, Bob is busy steaming off the old wallpaper.
3–05	"The Woburn House - 5"	February 15, 1982
This Old House host Bob Vila shows you how to waterproof a basement-turned-living room and discusses plans for installing a wood burning stove in the family room. Norm is busy putting in the new windows and doors.
3–06	"The Woburn House - 6"	February 28, 1982
Host Bob Vila helps install the shower in the new master bedroom. Then Bob shows you how to construct your own cabinets.
3–07	"The Woburn House - 7"	March 1, 1982
Bob Vila and carpenter Norm Abram tear down the old wood paneling in the basement rec room. Upstairs, it's time to install the new kitchen counter and decorate the master bath.
3–08	"The Woburn House - 8"	March 15, 1982
Bob Vila throws a little light on the subject of wiring the sunroom/breezeway addition. Then he warms up the garage-turned-living room with new insulation.
3–09	"The Woburn House - 9"	March 28, 1982
Carpenter Norm Abram shows you the right way to dry wall a new room including important tips on taping and sanding. Then Bob Vila and Norm talk about tools: which ones are right for the job.
3–10	"The Woburn House - 10"	April 1, 1982
Host Bob Vila shows you how to trim the windows and doors. He also gives you time-saving tips on preparing and painting interior walls.
3–11	"The Woburn House - 11"	April 15, 1982
Bob Vila is in the kitchen installing the new appliances. Carpenter Norm Abram is hard at work building a new rear Deck/Patio. Back indoors, Bob shares some professional secrets for mistake-proof wallpapering. It's easy when you know how.
3–12	"The Woburn House - 12"	April 28, 1982
Bob Vila gives you some pointers on laying a no-wax floor. Then Bob and Norm discuss the finishing touches on the renovation. Outside, Bob checks the progress of the landscaping.
3–13	"The Woburn House - 13"	May 1, 1982
The tract house from the 1950s is now a bright, new energy-efficient home for the 1980s. Bob Vila and carpenter Norm Abram take you on the grand tour of the newly renovated house, as This Old House wraps up its third season.

== Season 4 (1982-83) ==
- Bob Vila's fourth season as the host.

No. in season	Title	Original release date
The Arlington House
4–01	"The Arlington House - 1"	May 15, 1982
The fourth season of This Old House kicks off by taking on a tour of the newest project - a three-story Greek Revival farmhouse in Arlington, Massachusetts. Over the next 26 weeks, he and his crew of building craftsmen will transform this old house from the 1850s into an idea house for the 1980s that gives viewers and homeowners a new sense of what a home can be.
4–02	"The Arlington House - 2"	May 28, 1982
Our host considers the many remodeling possibilities for the old house with architect Jock Gifford and landscape architect Tom Wirth. Where to begin!
4–03	"The Arlington House - 3"	June 1, 1982
Our host brings in the crane and demolition of a portion of the old farmhouse begins. Later, our hosts talks with a slate contractor about the old slate roof and discusses the merits of sandblasting.
4–04	"The Arlington House - 4"	June 15, 1982
Our host and his crew jack up the garage, relocate it, and consider turning it into a workshop/garden shed. The crew also conducts a window and door energy audit.
4–05	"The Arlington House - 5"	June 28, 1982
Our host and master carpenter undertake the task of framing in the new 1982 wing of the 1850s Greek Revival farmhouse.
4–06	"The Arlington House - 6"	July 1, 1982
Our host and crew tackle the insulation of the old farmhouse's new wing.
4–07	"The Arlington House - 7"	July 15, 1982
Our host and crew assess the old farmhouse's electrical need and update wiring for today's lifestyle.
4–08	"The Arlington House - 8"	July 28, 1982
Our host and crew shingle the new wing and plaster ceilings in the old portion of the 1850s farmhouse.
4–09	"The Arlington House - 9"	August 1, 1982
Our host and crew waterproof an exterior deck. Later, he discusses electrical wiring in new and existing walls and talks with restoratian specialist Dr. Judy Selwyn about the original paint used in the old farmhouse.
4–10	"The Arlington House - 10"	August 15, 1982
Host Bob Vila installs replacement window sashes and balances with Norm Abram. Lighting selections and layout decisions are made for the ground floor of the house. The kitchen cabinets and island are laid out.
4–11	"The Arlington House - 11"	August 28, 1982
Host Bob Vila tours an exercise room and greenhouse spa on Nantucket Island. After sandblasting damage from improper installation of the front steps, and window sill are shown. Outdoor lighting and landscape planning is discussed during a tour of the grounds.
4–12	"The Arlington House - 12"	September 1, 1982
Host Bob Vila talks about concrete deck supports with Norm Abram, and looks at wooden and steel doors for the house. Rich Trethewey shows how a whirlpool tub will be installed in the master bathroom. Bob makes a trip to a local home improvement store to look at cabinets, a dishwasher and a fridge.
4–13	"The Arlington House - 13"	September 15, 1982
Host Bob Vila talks about climate control and wall covering in the wine cellar with Norm Abram. Bob tours another wine cellar previously designed by John Gifford. Another layer of insulation is added to the attic above the third floor. Sal shows Bob how to repair a chip in a circular plaster cornice and duplicate existing corner sections. Sam shows Bob different styles of fencing, and how the particular fence for the hose is made.
4–14	"The Arlington House - 14"	September 28, 1982
Tom Shoumarn shows Bob how the hot tub is installed and setup. Tom Worth and Wayne Mezin select a Canoe Birch tree for outside the kitchen, and other plants for around the house. Sal Vasallo demonstrates cornice plastering with a template in the media room.
4–15	"The Arlington House - 15"	October 1, 1982
Host Bob Vila talks to Jim Boroughs about storm window selection and installation. Jack describes how cabinets are made and finished.
4–16	"The Arlington House - 16"	October 7, 1982
Bob Vila shows off the new exercise room's skylight and patio doors. Outside of Santa Fe, New Mexico Bob tours a community of passive solar heated houses, walks through an adobe house in construction, and a finished house with solar panels. In the apartment kitchen Norm shows how to install a parquet floor.
4–17	"The Arlington House - 17"	October 14, 1982
Bob Vila shows how stain absorbs into the recently sand blasted house. A tree is wired for electricity. Calla Jean Schafer shows how to prepare and paint surfaces. Christy Stadelmaier tile for the steam room, upstairs bathrooms, and kitchen. Norm does finish work on a redwood doorjamb and baseboards.
4–18	"The Arlington House - 18"	October 21, 1982
Our host discusses the problem of roof damage on the newly expanded dining area. Next, he visits a super-insulated home in Aurora, Illinois, and talks with its builder Perry Bigelow about construction details.
4–19	"The Arlington House - 19"	October 28, 1982
Host Bob Vila tours the yard with landscape architect Tom Wirth to discuss the plans there.
4–20	"The Arlington House - 20"	November 1, 1982
Our host welcomes Better Homes and Gardens interior designer Bob Ditmer. Ditmer walks through the Arlington House and makes recommendations for the decor. Later, our master carpenter starts construction of the sauna.
4–21	"The Arlington House - 21"	November 7, 1982
Our host and the crew work outdoors installing the farmhouse's redwood gazebo and stockade fence. In the apartment kitchen, Richard Trethewey explains the installation of a sink and hot water heater.
4–22	"The Arlington House - 22"	November 14, 1982
Our host and the crew install Palladian windows on the garage and then outfit the apartment kitchen, Richard Trethewey explains the installation of a sink and hot water heater.
4–23	"The Arlington House - 23"	November 21, 1982
Our host and the crew install a Palladian window on the garage and then outfit the apartment kitchen with appliances. Later, our master carpenter builds and installs a passive lock system.
4–24	"The Arlington House - 24"	November 28, 1982
Our host reviews the installation of a projection television system in the media room and tile in the main kitchen. In the wine cellar, expert Phillipe Pascal makes suggestions for stocking French wines.
4–25	"The Arlington House - 25"	December 1, 1982
Our host walks through the Arlington farmhouse for another look at lighting needs, then discusses mirrors and equipment for the exercise room. Dr Amar Bose describes his recommendations for audio around the house. German wine expert Wilhelm Steifensand talks about his recommendations for the wine cellar.
4–26	"The Arlington House - 26"	December 7, 1982
Our host takes a final tour of the fully decorated ""dream house of the 1980s."" Starting on the second floor, he guides viewers through the exercise room, master bedroom and bath, and apartment. Then he descends the hallway stairs for a look at the totally equipped media room, library and dining room. There's a final view of the grounds, as This Old House wraps up its fourth season.

== Season 5 (1983–84) ==
- Bob Vila's fifth season as the host.
- Norm Abram grows a beard starting with this season.
- Starting with this season, the show's titling got revamped as The All New This Old House.

No. in season	Title	Original release date
The Brookline House
5–01	"The Brookline House - 1"	October 1, 1983
This Old House kicks off its fifth season, with a retrospective look at the first four seasons of This Old House. He recalls the restoration of a rundown Victorian house, the conversion of a mansion into condominiums, the expansion of a 1950s tract house and the rehabilitation of a Greek Revival-style farmhouse.
5–02	"The Brookline House - 2"	October 8, 1983
The star of this season's the All New This Old House is revealed: an energy-efficient solar home to be built from scratch in Brookline, Massachusetts. Our host introduces the new house site and talks to designer Steven Strong of Solar Design Associates about construction plans.
5–03	"The Brookline House - 3"	October 15, 1983
Designer Steven Strong and our host review the design of the new house step-by-step, from conception to final plans. A survey engineer describes the surveying process and how the house will ultimately be situated on the lot.
5–04	"The Brookline House - 4"	October 22, 1983
The work of digging a foundation for the new house begins. When the crew hits a rock ledge, they are forced to drill and blast in order to put in the bottom of the foundation.
5–05	"The Brookline House - 5"	October 29, 1983
Our host discusses construction of the foundation for the solar house in Brookline with the crew chief. Later, our host visits a couple in Sherborn, Massachusetts who have dismantled, moved and reassembled an historic house.
5–06	"The Brookline House - 6"	November 5, 1983
Landscape architect Tom Wirth discusses plans for a pool on the new site. Our host inspects the completed footings for the new house foundation.
5–07	"The Brookline House - 7"	November 12, 1983
Our master carpenter supervises concrete pouring and waterproofing for the foundation of the new house. Later, our host visits a solar home in Lexington, Massachusetts.
5–08	"The Brookline House - 8"	November 19, 1983
At the Brookline site, our host discusses the process of sealing the foundation sill with our master carpenter. Then our host looks at the Peabody House in Hollis, New Hampshire, an old home with a solar addition.
5–09	"The Brookline House - 9"	November 26, 1983
Our host visits a solar home in Wilton, Connecticut, which utilizes a unique system of window shutters to close off a glass atrium at night.
5–10	"The Brookline House - 10"	December 3, 1983
The All New This Old House surveys renovation and construction that is revitalizing the heart of Seattle, Washington. The crew visits the houseboat community of Roanoke Reef, view the restoration of Seattle's historic Alexis Hotel and explore the renovated Pike Place farmers' market.
5–11	"The Brookline House - 11"	December 10, 1983
Our host visits an apartment on Boston's historic Symphony Row and a solar home in Concord, New Hampshire. Back in the Brookline site, work continues on the new house.
5–12	"The Brookline House - 12"	December 17, 1983
Our host is in Stamford, Connecticut for a trip to United House Wrecking, the largest salvage yard of its kind on the East Coast. Our host surveys the yard's collection in search of come recycled architectural detail to incorporate into the design of the new house.
5–13	"The Brookline House - 13"	December 24, 1983
Our host and crew travel to New York City to investigate the reuse of some of its commercial buildings. With the help of architect who specializes in conversions, our host learns what loft living is all about.
5–14	"The Brookline House - 14"	December 31, 1983
Our host gives a progress report at the new house site and tours the most exclusive address in the world, The Trump Tower, Fifth Avenue, New York.
5–15	"The Brookline House - 15"	January 7, 1984
Work continues on the new solar home. Our host travels to Green Mountain Cabins in Chester, Vermont for a lookat how log cabins are manufactured.
5–16	"The Brookline House - 16"	January 14, 1984
After discussing the windows being installed at the new house, our host takes a quick trip to Medford, Wisconsin for a tour of the Hurd Millworks window manufacturing plant.
5–17	"The Brookline House - 17"	January 21, 1984
Installation of photovoltaic roof panels begins at the All New This Old House site in Brookline. Our host explains how the array of solar cells converts light from the sun directly into electrical current.
5–18	"The Brookline House - 18"	January 28, 1984
We visit Ryland Homes, manufacturers of pre-fabricated houses in Columbia, Maryland. Our host tours their factory where much of the construction takes place.
5–19	"The Brookline House - 19"	February 4, 1984
Our host visits the home of legendary American architect Frank Lloyd Wright in Oak Park, Illinois. Research Director Don Kalec explains how the structure was restored to its original 19th century state, and restoration expert Ed Johnson discusses the refinishing of some of the home's remarkable wooden doors.
5–20	"The Brookline House - 20"	February 11, 1984
We visit to Dallas to investigate another residential building alternative: a home that's computer-designed to offer optimum summer cooling efficiency.
5–21	"The Brookline House - 21"	February 18, 1984
Our host and our master carpenter report on the latest construction developments at the new house site in Brookline.
5–22	"The Brookline House - 22"	February 25, 1984
We travel to Riverside, California for a look at an unusual housing alternative: a computer-designed, mobile home park.
5–23	"The Brookline House - 23"	March 3, 1984
Our host and company are in Hawaii to explore a unique island dwelling.
5–24	"The Brookline House - 24"	March 10, 1984
The winner of the Metropolitan Home interior design contest is featured.
5–25	"The Brookline House - 25"	March 17, 1984
The crew puts finishing touches on the solar home in Brookline.
5–26	"The Brookline House - 26"	March 24, 1984
Our host takes viewers for a grand tour of the completed solar home, as This Old House wraps up its fifth season.

== Season 6 (1984–85) ==
- Bob Vila's sixth season as the host.
- Starting with this season, the host began talking to the homeowners.
- The pros' names began appearing on-screen.
- This is the last season to have the "flipping pages" closing credits. It had been used since Season 1.

No. in season	Title	Original release date
In and Around Boston
6–01	"In and Around Boston - 1; Hidden Asset - 1"	October 5, 1984
This Old House kicks off its sixth season by looking into the concept of ""sweat equity"" will fuel the series. The season's first project consists of converting an attic into a new master bedroom and bathroom. Our host meets homeowners Rob and Jennifer to begin planning for what the job will entail, in consultation with our master carpenter and Richard Trethewey.
6–02	"In and Around Boston - 2; Hidden Asset - 2"	October 12, 1984
While the designs for the new bedroom and bathroom are being finalized, our host and the homeowner look into such details as wiring, piping and telephone hookups. After a visit to the Lynn Ladder & Scaffold Company in Lynn, Massachusetts, Rob and Jennifer begin demolition, with help from our master carpenter.
6–03	"In and Around Boston - 3; Hidden Asset - 3"	October 19, 1984
Exterior work for the new bedroom and bathroom gets underway, including framing and sheathing. Our host and our master carpenter discuss the new deck, exterior trim, sliding glass door, and new double hung window.
6–04	"In and Around Boston - 4; Hidden Asset - 4"	October 26, 1984
Work continues on the new bedroom and bathroom, with Rob and Jennifer tackling the job of shingling, including the installation of flashing. Meanwhile, the rough plumbing work begins.
6–05	"In and Around Boston - 5; Hidden Asset - 5"	November 2, 1984
The new bathroom begins to take shape, as homeowners Jennifer and Rob install a new fiberglass shower with our host's help. Our host and Rob also tackle electrical work.
6–06	"In and Around Boston - ;6 Hidden Asset - 6"	November 9, 1984
Accompanied by Richard Trethewey, Rob and Jennifer visit a plumbing fixtures store. Later, the bathroom floor is tiled and work begins on the new outside deck.
6–07	"In and Around Boston - 7; Hidden Asset - 7"	November 16, 1984
It's time for the finishing touches to be applied to the new master bedroom and bathroom. Our host says goodbye to the weary but satisfied homeowners and their space, and previews the season's next project - the conversion of an unfinished basement into a family room.
6–08	"In and Around Boston - 8; Playground - 1"	November 23, 1984
Our host introduces the next set of do-it-yourselfers: Debbie and Dick, homeowners want to create a family entertainment center and den in their dank basement. After we visit other completed basements to get ideas, work begins with the demolition of old closet space.
6–09	"In and Around Boston - 9; Playground - 2"	November 30, 1984
Homeowners Dick and Debbie begin construction on their basement family room by framing, insulating and sheathing the side walls. They also discuss ideas for wall paneling.
6–10	"In and Around Boston - 10; Playground - 3"	December 7, 1984
The basement family room takes shape as the electrical wiring, wall paneling and suspended ceiling are installed.
6–11	"In and Around Boston - 11; Playground - 4"	December 14, 1984
Our master carpenter offers assistance with the construction of shelves and storage cabinets for the basement entertainment room. Later, resilient vinyl flooring is laid.
6–12	"In and Around Boston - 12; Playground - 5"	December 21, 1984
The homeowners call in a mason, install lighting fixtures and welcome interior decorator Joseph Ruggiero from Ethan Allen, manufacturers of traditional furniture.
6–13	"In and Around Boston - 13; A House of Green Leaves - 1"	December 28, 1984
Our host introduces the next set of novice do-it-yourselfers, Meade and Bob of Reading, Massachusetts, who will be adding a single-story greenhouse to their Cape-style home. The couple will assemble the greenhouse from a kit and call upon professionals to assist them with the work of laying the foundation, installing a heating system and wiring the space for lighting fixtures.
6–14	"In and Around Boston - 14; A House of Green Leaves - 2"	January 4, 1985
The greenhouse frame are erected and the window glazing process is demonstrated. Later, quilted shades are installed over the windows to provide insulation at night.
6–15	"In and Around Boston - 15; A House of Green Leaves - 3"	January 11, 1985
The homeowners learn how to install plumbing for the greenhouse heating system and how to wire the new addition for electricity.
6–16	"In and Around Boston - 16; A House of Green Leaves - 4"	January 18, 1985
The homeowners get a lesson in carpentry as redwood benches and shelves for the greenhouse are constructed.
6–17	"In and Around Boston - 17; Kitchen Kitsch - 1"	January 25, 1985
Our host introduces the next project of the season: a kitchen remodeling. Our host and the homeowners named Roy and Avra discuss how to update the kitchen facilities and layout while maintaining the traditional late-Victorian look of the home.
6–18	"In and Around Boston - 18; Kitchen Kitsch - 2"	February 1, 1985
Demolition begins on the kitchen remodeling project when a dumpster is secured. Richard Trethewey gives the homeowners some unsettling news about the jumble of pipes in the basement.
6–19	"In and Around Boston - 19; Kitchen Kitsch - 3"	February 8, 1985
Our host tours the Brosco window manufacturing plant in North Andover, Massachusetts, before installing a bay window in the kitchen. The kitchen walls are insulated and new plumbing is inspected in the basement.
6–20	"In and Around Boston - 20; Kitchen Kitsch - 4"	February 15, 1985
The homeowners pick up new kitchen appliances, with the help of a professional kitchen designer. Custom-made oak cabinets are installed.
6–21	"In and Around Boston - 21; Kitchen Kitsch - 5"	February 22, 1985
The new kitchen receives a sink and garage disposal system, and tiling techniques are reviewed.
6–22	"In and Around Boston - 22; Kitchen Kitsch - 6"	March 1, 1985
Finishing touches are applied in the remodeled kitchen. The beech flooring is completed, a wood stove is installed, and the kitchen is outfitted with cooking accessories.
6–23	"In and Around Boston - 23; An Artful Apartment - 1"	March 8, 1985
Our host introduces the final project of the season: a disaster of an apartment beginning for redecoration. Working with designer Ben Lloyd of Metropolitan Home magazine, tenants Margie and Eric begin to think about use of color, furnishing and accessories.
6–24	"In and Around Boston - 24; An Artful Apartment - 2"	March 15, 1985
Experts at the New England Design Center advise our host and the apartment dwellers on choosing fabrics, furnishings and carpeting. Back in the apartment, Ben Lloyd presents final plans for the redecoration and design.
6–25	"In and Around Boston - 25; An Artful Apartment - 3"	March 22, 1985
Lighting expert Richard Mecher discusses portable lighting fixtures for the apartment. Our host reviews progress in the kitchen and oversees restoration of the cork floor in the guest room and office.
6–26	"In and Around Boston - 26; An Artful Apartment - 4"	March 29, 1985
Final details are completed in the apartment, including the installation of state-of-the-art telephone and a personal computer. Designer Ben Lloyd, tenants Margie and Eric and our host take a final tour of the newly decorated apartment, and so ends the sixth season of This Old House.

== Season 7 (1985–86) ==
- Bob Vila's seventh season as the host.
- Starting with this season, the closing credits no longer have flipping pages, they're now carded over a live-action scene.

No. in season	Title	Original release date
The Newton Cottage
7–01	"The Newton Cottage - 1"	October 10, 1985
This Old House kicks off its seventh season by meeting homeowners Linda and Bill to plan the first project: a two-story addition to an 1860s Victorian in Newton, Massachusetts. The new free-standing structure - connected to the original building via skywalk - is slated to consist of a one-car garage and storage area with an interior staircase leading to a second-floor family room and home office. A member of the Boston-based Society for the Preservation of New England Antiquities (SPNEA) will be on hand to point out the historically significant features of the original house.
7–02	"The Newton Cottage - 2"	October 17, 1985
Final plans for the addition are reviewed with the architects. Then we make an encore visit to the United Wrecking Company to see what gems can be culled from the Connecticut salvage yard.
7–03	"The Newton Cottage - 3"	October 24, 1985
A hole is dug for the foundation of the new addition, and the slab is poured. Our master carpenter demonstrates the carpentry skills necessary for framing.
7–04	"The Newton Cottage - 4"	October 31, 1985
As our host gets into the nuts and bolts of roof installation, the Victorian's homeowners learn the art of shingling. Meanwhile, our master carpenter tackles the finish work by trimming the addition's windows.
7–05	"The Newton Cottage - 5"	November 7, 1985
Construction continues with the installation of the staircase. Homeowners insulate the structure and our master carpenter discusses and demonstrates the framing and installation of windows. Our host takes a side trip to Diamond Head, Hawaii, to tour the construction.
7–06	"The Newton Cottage - 6"	November 14, 1985
The garage door is installed, while work on the water and heating systems for the new bathroom proceeds with rough plumbing and gas fitting. Homeowners the get a lesson in rough electrical wiring.
7–07	"The Newton Cottage - 7"	November 21, 1985
Tile is installed in the new addition. On an excursion to Seattle, Washington, our host looks at a renovated hotel and visits elegant houseboats.
7–08	"The Newton Cottage - 8"	November 28, 1985
Inside, final electrical work is performed in the new addition and carpet is installed, while outside homeowners nail shingles and apply stain. Completion of the project is marked by a recap of the budget, and cost-saving measures are discussed. Our host learns the art of making white cedar shingles at a mill in Quebec.
The Reading Ranch
7–09	"The Reading Ranch - 1"	December 5, 1985
The second project of the season begins: doubling the living space of a ranch house by raising the roof to create a second floor. Our host discusses the homeowners' needs and reviews remodeling plans with them, a banker explains various ways to finance home improvement, and another ranch home where similar remodeling has been completed is visited.
7–10	"The Reading Ranch - 2"	December 12, 1985
The project gets underway with demolition of the existing roof and opening of the house. Carpenters race to frame and close in the new second floor to protect the structure from weather.
7–11	"The Reading Ranch - 3"	December 19, 1985
Construction of the ranch house's new roof is completed, and shingling begins. Our host and the crew visit Hancock Lumber in Casco, Maine, to watch as timber is milled into dimension lumber.
7–12	"The Reading Ranch - 4"	December 26, 1985
Windows are installed in the new second-floor ranch house addition, and our master carpenter discusses the pros and cons of various types of siding with an expert contractor. The Gropius House in Lincoln, Massachusetts, is the subject of a special field trip to examine the architectural origins of the American ranch-style home.
7–13	"The Reading Ranch - 5"	January 2, 1986
The ranch house's new second floor receives rough electrical wiring and plumbing and a whirlpool tub is installed in the master bath. Our host leads us on an encore trip to Acorn Homes, manufacturers of renowned for appealing design and energy efficiency.
7–14	"The Reading Ranch - 6"	January 9, 1986
The exterior of the second-story ranch house addition gets vinyl siding, with commentary by an expert in the field. Meanwhile, the interior of the addition is insulated and rough electrical wiring installed. Our master carpenter discusses the addition's exterior trimwork with Frank, the homeowner.
7–15	"The Reading Ranch - 7"	January 16, 1986
We go on an encore field trip to Ryland Homes, Maryland-based manufacturers of prefabricated houses renowned for low cost and energy efficiency. Back at the construction site, our host and our master carpenter work with Frank to build the deck on his new second-story addition.
7–16	"The Reading Ranch - 8"	January 23, 1986
Tile work is done in the master bath of the new addition, and new fixtures are installed. With work nearing completion, our master carpenter builds a staircase to the new second floor.
7–17	"The Reading Ranch - 9"	January 30, 1986
Frank mills the pineapple detail typical to garrison colonials. Mary Jane and Frank give our host a tour of the newly-finished addition - complete with paint, wallpaper, and carpet - and then they review the budget.
The Melrose House
7–18	"The Melrose House - 1"	February 6, 1986
The third project of the season gets underway, as homeowners Tug and Beth begin planning the remodeling of their attic with our host. Tug and our host visit a nearby attic apartment, and our master carpenter explains what's involved in changing of the structure of a roof.
7–19	"The Melrose House - 2"	February 13, 1986
Our master carpenter prepares Tug's attic for construction. Our host takes viewers on a field trip to Cornerstones, where homeowners (and would-be homeowners) learn to be homebuilders.
7–20	"The Melrose House - 3"	February 20, 1986
Work proceeds inside and out on Tug's attic, as the roof is shingled and skylights and windows are installed. Our host is given a special tour of New York's Trump Tower, where luxury and elegance abound.
7–21	"The Melrose House - 4"	February 27, 1986
The nearly-completed attic renovation is ready to be insulated. Our host sets off for the Lexington Hotel in Chicago, once headquarters for Al Capone and now being renovated by Sunbow, a foundation that trains women in carpentry and other construction skills.
7–22	"The Melrose House - 5"	March 6, 1986
Carpet is laid and finish work completed in Tug and Beth's attic addition. Our host pays a visit to admire the new living space - complete with furniture - and reviews the budget with the homeowners.
The Tampa House
7–23	"The Tampa House - 1"	March 13, 1986
This Old House breaks new ground as renovation of a Tampa, Florida, home begins. Our host takes viewers on a tour of the ""sights and sounds"" of Tampa and introduces homeowners Paul and Amelia, as well as Tampa contractor Bob Diaz, who will supervise the project. Our master carpenter pays a surprise visit.
7–24	"The Tampa House - 2"	March 20, 1986
New ""heat-shielding"" windows are installed in Paul and Amelia's one-story home, and the house is inspected for termites. Rigid ductwork is installed for the new central air-conditioning system. The crew travels to Seaside, Florida, a modern residential and resort community near Panama City.
7–25	"The Tampa House - 3"	March 27, 1986
Our host, a Miami native, visits his hometown to admire the award-winning, trend-setting work of Laurinda Spear and Bernardo Fort-Brescia of Arquitectonica. In Tampa, our host and Bob Diaz review construction of Paul and Amelia's home, with special attention to the masonry work and new solar hot water system. Work is started on the redwood deck, and an expert stucco contractor pays a visit.
7–26	"The Tampa House - 4"	April 3, 1986
Construction is completed on Paul and Amelia's house, now graced with landscaping and a spacious redwood deck. The new ""Florida room"" is carpeted and a screened enclosure off the dining room is completed. Our host reviews the budget with the tired but happy homeowners, as This Old House wraps up its seventh season.

== Season 8 (1986–87) ==
- Bob Vila's eighth season as the host.

No. in season	Title	Original release date
The Reading House
8–01	"The Reading House - 1"	October 16, 1986
The eighth season of This Old House kicks off by reviewing last season's projects - including the popular ranch-home makeover - and introduces the new project: the renovation of a 40-year-old Cape-style home. Homeowners Claire and John tour the house and our master carpenter surveys the project.
8–02	"The Reading House - 2"	1986
Architect Scott Finn goes over plans for renovating John and Claire's Cape-style home, and demolition and excavation begin. Richard Trethewey gives advice on plumbing and heating needs; and our host takes viewers on a tour of a 200-year-old Cape home.
8–03	"The Reading House - 3"	1986
The mason arrives to work on the footings and foundation of John and Claire's Cape home. Our host then takes viewers to a high-tech concrete block factory. Our master carpenter starts framing the family room addition, and our host looks at the new windows the homeowners have selected. John and Claire start planning the interior design of the new addition, while the crew begins demolition of inside walls.
8–04	"The Reading House - 4"	1986
The guys review progress on the Cape renovation, and then our master carpenter shows how to cut rafters and frame the roof, which is sheathed with plywood.
8–05	"The Reading House - 5"	1986
Our host reviews the progress to date on the renovation of John and Claire's Cape-style home. New windows are installed, and we turn our attention to the roof, where roofing paper, snow-and-ice shield, and shingles are applied.
8–06	"The Reading House - 6"	1986
Work on the Cape's mechanical systems begins, as rough plumbing, a central vacuuming system, and wiring for a new security system are installed. Our master carpenter starts the foundation for a new deck to be built at the back of the house, and the gas line is laid for the new heating system.
8–07	"The Reading House - 7"	1986
Homeowner John shows our host his expertise in the fine points of blueboard. Our master carpenter works on the foundation of the new desk, and the plumber pays a visit.
8–08	"The Reading House - 8"	1986
We travel to Norm's pre-New Yankee Workshop to begin working on custom cabinets for the Cape home, with assistance from an expert woodworker. Our host takes a side trip to admire old-fashioned kitchen cabinets in an antique home, and homeowner John demonstrates his plastering technique. Note: The barn was built by Norm Abram in 1979, would later become known as The New Yankee Workshop in 1989.
8–09	"The Reading House - 9"	1986
Custom-made kitchen cabinets are installed in John and Claire's home, and Claire turns her attention to the new bathroom, where she installs tiles. Our master carpenter works on interior trim.
8–10	"The Reading House - 10"	1986
Our host takes a trip to see how the synthetic marble material for the new kitchen countertops is made. Plumbing fixtures are installed in the new bathroom; a lighting consultant pays a visit; and an energy-efficient hot water heater is installed. John and Claire visit a lighting supply store.
8–11	"The Reading House - 11"	1986
The Cape receives new flooring and our host visits Sweden to tour the factory where this do-it-yourself product is manufactured. The exterior of the house is stained.
8–12	"The Reading House - 12"	1986
Work on John and Claire's Cape home is completed. Interior designer Bette Rosenberg leads a tour the house, with its new kitchen featuring high-tech appliances, family room, upstairs bedrooms and bath.
The Brimfield House
8–13	"The Brimfield House - 1"	1987
In search of inspiration for a vacation home, our host visits Hyannis on Cape Cod to tour a beach-front home, a luxury condominium and lakeside property. The season's second project gets underway as our host tours Bob Houde's mountainside land in Brimfield, Massachusetts, and they begin to plan the building of a vacation home.
8–14	"The Brimfield House - 2"	1987
A dowster explains the art of finding water to our host and landover Bob Houde; a well is dug; and a surveyor goes over the fine points of a perc test. The importance of a water-quality test is explained, and our host looks at the special water pump.
8–15	"The Brimfield House - 3"	1987
We visit a vacation home similar to the one being built in Brimfield, and the homeowner meets with architect Jock Gifford. Later, the new vacation home begins to materialize as lumber arrives and the structure is raised.
8–16	"The Brimfield House - 4"	1987
Our master carpenter shows us how to install double-hung windows, explains skylight installation and puts a sliding glass door in the vacation home.
8–17	"The Brimfield House - 5"	1987
Ricard Trethewey pays a visit to Brimfield to discuss the vacation home's heating needs with our host and the homeowner. An exhibition in Malmo, Sweden, shows the latest designs in manufactured housing.
8–18	"The Brimfield House - 6"	1987
The vacation home receives interior finishes such as decorative, low-maintenance plywood paneling. Viewers visit our master carpenter's workshop to watch as he builds screens for the veranda.
8–19	"The Brimfield House - 7"	1987
An energy-efficient wood-burning stove is installed in the vacation home. Our host larns about the new water purifier. We then learn how to hang interior doors. Kitchen appliances and plumbing fixtures installed.
8–20	"The Brimfield House - 8"	1987
Our host takes viewers on a tour of the finished vacation home. A flooring expert shows how vinyl floors are installed and the vacation home receives various electrical finishing touches, such as smoke detectors, fans and a thermostat.
The Phoenix House
8–21	"The Phoenix House - 1"	1987
This Old House visits Pioneer, Arizona, a typical ""Wild West"" town, and our host meets Phoenix homeowners Tom and Ellen to tour their adobe-style house. The homeowners meet with their architect and contractor.
8–22	"The Phoenix House - 2"	1987
Our master carpenter pays a surprise visit to This Old House's Phoenix renovation project, and Tom and Ellen begin work on their Southwestern renovation project.
8–23	"The Phoenix House - 3"	1987
Tom and Ellen's Phoenix home receives exterior insulation and flashing, as well as a typical Southwestern viga and latilla ceiling in the master bedroom for added protection from the heat. The balcony piers and staircase are finished with adobe plastering, and viewers learn how to install flagstone paving. Our host pays a visit to Frank Lloyd Wright's famed Talesin West.
8–24	"The Phoenix House - 4"	1987
The flat roof of Tom and Ellen's Phoenix home is protected with cold membrane roofing, and tiles are laid on the balcony. Our host takes viewers on a tour of an unusual modern ""castle"" on Camelback.
8–25	"The Phoenix House - 5"	1987
Fixtures are installed in the remodeled bathroom of Tom and Ellen's Phoenix home, and the house receives energy-efficient windows. Our host checks on the progress of the new reading nook, and takes viewers on a visit to the renowned Arizona Biltmore Hotel.
8–26	"The Phoenix House - 6"	April 9, 1987
Awnings and special sun-shade screening are used to protect Tom and Ellen's Phoenix home from the southwestern heat, and balcony doors are hung. The landscape designer puts the finishing touches on the backyard pool area of this Sunbelt renovation. Our host escorts viewers on a tour of the territorial-style home, and bids a fond farewell to the charms of Arizona as This Old House wraps up its eighth season.

== Season 9 (1987-88) ==
- Bob Vila's ninth season as the host.
- Richard Trethewey is now clean shaven.
- Tom Silva's first season as general contractor.

No. in season	Title	Original release date
The Westwood House
9–01	"The Westwood House - 1"	October 1, 1987
The ninth season of This Old House kicks off with a tour of the Weatherbee Farm, a 1785 farmhouse, with homeowners Bill and Cynthia and architectural historian Sara Chase from the Society for the Preservation of New England Antiquities.
9–02	"The Westwood House - 2"	October 8, 1987
Our master carpenter assesses the condition of Weatherbee Farm and architect Mary Otis Stevens discusses plans for restoration of this 1785 landmark structure. Our heating and plumbing expert pays a visit to the new project, and discusses heating and cooling systems with the homeowners.
9–03	"The Westwood House - 3"	October 15, 1987
Our master carpenter continues to assess the condition of Weatherbee Farm. Architect Mary Otis Stevens shows homeowner Cynthia the model she has created of the farm. Our host and homeowner Bill help out as the dismantling of the ell begins.
9–04	"The Westwood House - 4"	October 22, 1987
Our host and master carpenter discuss the progress of the Weatherbee Farm restoration. Lead removal expert John Vega inspects the house, Richard Trethewey discusses the heating plans for the new kitchen wing and shows the homeowners the radiant heat system in his own house. The foundation for the new win is poured, the homeowners steam off wall paper from the plaster walls, and electrician Buddy Bisnaw stops by to discuss rewiring the house with our host.
9–05	"The Westwood House - 5"	October 29, 1987
Our master carpenter supervises the raising of the wall that finishes enclosing the partially framed new kitchen addition. Our host checks in with the homeowners and gives an update on the restorations progress.
9–06	"The Westwood House - 6"	November 5, 1987
Our host and master carpenter install true divided light French doors in Weatherbee Farm's new kitchen addition. Homeowners Bill and Cynthia start roofing the addition with Western red cedar shingles. An asbestos removal expert shows us how this hazardous material is removed from the basement pipes.
9–07	"The Westwood House - 7"	November 12, 1987
Our host gives an update on the progress of the Weatherbee Farm restoration. Windows are installed in the new wing, and our host takes viewers to Bayport, Minnesota, to visit a state-of-the-art window factory that covers 50 acres.
9–08	"The Westwood House - 8"	November 19, 1987
Our host and master painter Sam Perry of the Edward K. Perry Paint Company discuss the preparation of Weatherbee Farm for exterior painting. Insulation specialist Larry Gordon determines the insulation needs of the house and master carpenter installs fir decking on the front porch. In the cellar, the old furnace and pipes - now free of their asbestos insulation - are removed.
9–09	"The Westwood House - 9"	November 26, 1987
Our master carpenter crafts decorative arches for the exterior of the new kitchen addition and installs them over the French doors. Our host supervises as decorative balusters are lathed, and insulation is blown into the existing structure. In Weatherbee Farm's front parlor, the ceiling is replaced.
9–10	"The Westwood House - 10"	December 3, 1987
Work starts on the deck railings, and our master carpenter shows our host how to turn decorative ballusters on a lathe. Painting foreman Chester Glowacz gives step-by-step instruction on painting window sash, while inside, the new addition insulated.
9–11	"The Westwood House - 11"	December 10, 1987
Exterior work on Weatherbee Farm continues as paint and restoration specialist Sam Perry supervises preparation of the house for painting, starting with priming. A special European technique is used to line the aged chimney to make it safe for modern heating systems. Our host sees how new wooden gutters are installed on the front porch. Then he and landscape architect Tom Wirth discuss plans for the grounds.
9–12	"The Westwood House - 12"	December 17, 1987
Our host and master painter Sam Perry discuss the progress of Weatherbee Farm's exterior paint work. The new addition is blueboarded, and plasterer Calvin Mills demonstrates his art. Security systems specialist Edmund F. Baker shows us the hard-wired security system recommended for the house. Our master carpenter instructs homeowner Bill in replacing window sash cords.
9–13	"The Westwood House - 13"	December 24, 1987
Our master carpenter installs barnboard from the old well at one end of the new kitchen addition. Tom McGrath stops by to discuss restoring the new wellhead for a decorative feature. A new driveway is excavated and paved with backrun.
9–14	"The Westwood House - 14"	December 31, 1987
Our host visits a New Hampshire mill, where reproduction shutters are crafted using 19th century equipment. At Weatherbee Farm, the front porch has a new rubber membrane roof, and master carpenter hangs shutters.
9–15	"The Westwood House - 15"	January 7, 1988
The outside of Weatherbee Farm is the focus, as a stone wall is built in the garden area, work starts on a brick wall. Inside, the guys uncover some of the hardwood floor in search of a fireplace hearth.
9–16	"The Westwood House - 16"	January 14, 1988
At Weatherbee Farm, landscaping proceeds as shrubs and flowers are planted, and the renovated wellhead is installed. In the dining room, master carpenter uncovers some of the hardwood floor in search of a fireplace hearth.
9–17	"The Westwood House - 17"	January 21, 1988
Southern yellow pine flooring is laid over the new radiant heat system in the Weatherbee Farm's kitchen addition. At our master carpenter's workshop, the guys show how the vanity for the new master bathroom was built. Our host looks at the tile to be installed in the shower stall of the new master bath and tries out a new system for removing paint.
9–18	"The Westwood House - 18"	January 28, 1988
Cast acrylic countertops and sink and hancrafted, custom-made cabinets are installed in Weatherbee Farm's new kitchen addition, and our host visits the workshop where the countertops were fabricated. Our master carpenter demonstrates a new saw. Outside, new picket-style fencing is installed in the garden and surface gravel is spread on the driveway.
9–19	"The Westwood House - 19"	February 4, 1988
A specialist from the E.K. Perry Paint Company demonstrates the art of sponge painting in Weatherbee Farm's living room. Artisan Jeannie Serpa shows us the art of painting in the faux marble technique. Wallpaper is hung in the nursery and Jeff Hoskings refinishes a floor.
9–20	"The Westwood House - 20"	February 11, 1988
Our host leads us on a tour of the finished and decorated Weatherbee Farm with interior designer Jean LeMon. Upstairs, designer Joe Ruggiero shows us simple decorated techniques used in the master bedroom and bath.
The Santa Barbara Bungalow
9–21	"The Santa Barbara Bungalow - 1"	February 18, 1988
Our host takes viewers to Santa Barbara, California, to meet homeowners Susan and David and tour their 1923 Craftsman bungalow. Architect Brian Cearnal and the contractor are introduced to our host and our master carpenter.
9–22	"The Santa Barbara Bungalow - 2"	February 25, 1988
Our host reviews the plans for remodeling Susan and David's bungalow. Demolition of the partially finished attic begins. Our host visits the Gamble House in Pasadena, a 1908 Craftsman landmark designed by Charles and Henry Greene.
9–23	"The Santa Barbara Bungalow - 3"	March 3, 1988
Richard Trethewey introduces Santa Barbara heating and plumbing contractor George Brazil. Framing of the bungalow's new hip-roof dormer begins under the crew's supervision. Our master carpenter begins milling the pergola and a new stairway is being built.
9–24	"The Santa Barbara Bungalow - 4"	March 10, 1988
Work on the California bungalow continues with the homeowners pitching in. The crew starts shingling the new roof, and our master carpenter starts to assemble the pergola. Electrician Rudy Escalera stops by and landscape architect Grant Castleberg shows his rough design plans. Later, our host takes a tour of the Hearst Castle in San Simeon.
9–25	"The Santa Barbara Bungalow - 5"	March 17, 1988
Our host gives a progress report on the Craftsman bungalow project and finishing touches are put on the house as tiling is completed and a new door is hung.
9–26	"The Santa Barbara Bungalow - 6"	March 24, 1988
Work on Susan and David's Craftsman bungalow is completed, and our host gives viewers through the newly enlarged house, and so ends the 9th season of This Old House.

== Season 10 (1988–89) ==
- This is the last season with Bob Vila as the host. After 10 seasons, Bob Vila says goodbye to This Old House. He became a spokesman for Sears in 1989, and signed contracts with advertising agent Ogilvy & Mather to create a syndicated home improvement show in 1990 called Home Again with Bob Vila. In 1991, the show's titling got revamped as Bob Vila's Home Again, which stayed until the end of the show's run in 2005. In 1989, Norm Abram launched a half-hour woodworking show, called The New Yankee Workshop, which ran for 21 seasons.
- With Vila at the helm, This Old House began to broaden its scope.
- In addition to Vila hosting, several pros began hosting segments.
- Roger Cook's first full season as landscape expert.

No. in season	Title	Original release date
The Lexington Bed and Breakfast
10–01	"The Lexington Bed and Breakfast - 1"	September 1, 1988
Bob Vila kicks off Season 10 of This Old House, touring Lexington real estate with agent June Goodwin, looking at older homes as well as newer construction. We tour a new condo development, and then meet our new project's homeowners, Mary-Van and Jim Sinek.
10–02	"The Lexington Bed and Breakfast - 2"	1988
Mary-Van and Jim Sinek discuss expanding their side-by-side, two-family Lexington home with a new addition, which will double the existing square-footage of one unit and include a new master bedroom and bathroom, enlarged and efficient kitchen with adjacent breakfast room / dining room for family reunions and the bed-and-breakfast operation a spacious family room, two outdoor decks: one for family use, the other for b-and-b guests; and an attached two-car garage. Bob Vila visits a local bed and breakfast for a behind-the-scenes look at how it's done. Then Jim and our host discuss the architect's model for the project.
10–03	"The Lexington Bed and Breakfast - 3"	1988
Bob Vila shows us how to use a laser level, which excavators use to achieve uniform depth for foundation footings. He, our master carpenter and excavator Herb Brockett discuss excavation plans and begins the loam removal. Then Bob Vila pays a visit to the Metropolitan Home's Showcase, a five-story classic Manhattan townhouse decorated by world-class artists and designers including Mario Buatta, David Hockney, Norma Kamali and Wolfgang Puck to benefit AIDS patients.
10–04	"The Lexington Bed and Breakfast - 4"	1988
Bob Vila and master carpenter Norm Abram meet with Gene Romanelli to discuss foundation footings and begin pouring the concrete garage slab. Our host then discusses a revised floorplan with the architect. Interior demolition begins in the old part of the house. Our host tours another local bed and breakfast with owners Joan and Fletch Ashley.
10–05	"The Lexington Bed and Breakfast - 5"	1988
Jim Sinek and the guys remove the interior wall in the living room. Bob Vila meets with concrete specialist Rich Toohey, and then watches the installation of the bulkhead. Plumbing and Heating expert Richard Trethewey pays a visit to discuss the existing heating system and the possibilities for a new one.
10–06	"The Lexington Bed and Breakfast - 6"	1988
Bob Vila watches demolition in the kitchen, including the removal of the sink and cabinets. Then he and Mary-Van discuss options for the new kitchen. We meet up with general contractor Tom Silva to learn the finer points of house framing. Bob Vila joins Mary-Van in the demolition of the kitchen ceiling.
10–07	"The Lexington Bed and Breakfast - 7"	1988
After getting a progress report from Bob Vila, our master carpenter confers with general contractor Tom Silva. Bob Vila then meets with Tom Wirth to discuss a wheelchair accessible-entry for the new house. Then he meets again with Mary-Van to discuss the budget and further changes in the floorplan.
10–08	"The Lexington Bed and Breakfast - 8"	1988
The garage is nearly complete and fitted with trim that has been primed before construction. Bob Vila and Mary-Van discuss insulation in the garage ceiling and the wall that meets the kitchen. Master carpenter Norm Abram and general contractor Tom Silva install a low-maintenance, vinyl-clad window that has been adapted to make it more appropriate to an 1800s house. Then Bob Vila meets with security specialist Don Martini to learn more about interior and exterior motion detection systems, as well as reprogrammable alarm access code for bed and breakfast guests. He then meets up with our master carpenter on the roof where he's installed a skylight. Plumbing and Heating expert Richard Trethewey debates the merits of different heating.
10–09	"The Lexington Bed and Breakfast - 9"	1988
Cedar siding arrives and the crew begins to install it. Lighting consultant Dick Metchears meets with Bob Vila to discuss fixtures. Audio consultant Dr. Amar Bose discusses the home audio system. Finally, Plumbing and Heating expert Richard Trethewey presents the new system chosen to heat the house.
10–10	"The Lexington Bed and Breakfast - 10"	1988
Bob Vila meets with landscape artist Roger Hopkins to check his progress on the granite wall and terrace. Then we visit the Blue Mountain Quarry in South Ryegate, Vermont, where the stone originated. Back in Lexington, Mary-Van is busy looking at paint samples and choosing colors for the new rooms.
10–11	"The Lexington Bed and Breakfast - 11"	1988
Bob Vila and Tom Wirth look at the new plantings that have arrived at the jobsite. We then check Roger Hopkins' progress on the granite steps, terrace and garden pool. Inside, Bob Vila finds general contractor Tom Silva installing rigid insulation. Then he and Dick Metchears discuss lighting options for the garage. Lastly, Jed Harrison of the EPA educates us on the dangers of radon: how homeowners can detect it and what actions can be taken to make a home radon safe.
10–12	"The Lexington Bed and Breakfast - 12"	1988
The crew is busy installing the new decking at the back of the house. Bob Vila meets with zero-clearance fireplace specialist Lou DeMaria to discuss the living room's new fireplace. He then talks over plumbing fixtures with Plumbing and Heating expert Richard Trethewey and then head down to the basement to see the pipes and how they can be check for leaks. Then Mary visits a plumbing supply house to select new fixtures.
10–13	"The Lexington Bed and Breakfast - 13"	1988
Bob Vila meets with Tom Wirth to discuss progress on landscaping. Then we watch as Ken Dickenson puts in the exposed aggregate concrete wheelchair walkway. Later, he'll wash the concrete off to expose the pebble aggregate. Joe Manzi installs a central vacuum system and explains to Mary-Von how it works. The crew installs the garage door.
10–14	"The Lexington Bed and Breakfast - 14"	1988
The new plantings are in and a vegetable garden fence is put in place. The crew installs wallboard while Bob Vila and master carpenter Norm Abram see a butane heater that will be used to keep the house warm and allow plasters to work without damaging the walls until the actual heating system is in working order. Then we visit a couple who has modified their home for future wheelchair access. Finally, Bob Vila meets electrical contractor Buddy Bisnaw who is installing a Square D breaker box.
10–15	"The Lexington Bed and Breakfast - 15"	1988
Bob Vila and master carpenter Norm Abram discusses how the rain gutters can best divert water away from the fir deck, wooden doors, and kitchen windows. Then the crew installs plywood panelling in the basement, and we make a visit to the plant where it was made. Mary-Van shows us the wheelchair accessible bathroom, where extra supports are in place to hold a freestanding sink and to provide sturdy grab-bars. The crew stalls cedar paneling in a storage over the garage. The outside of the house gets a first coat of primer as the show comes to a close.
10–16	"The Lexington Bed and Breakfast - 16"	1988
Bob Vila and Jim Sinek discuss the budget. Meanwhile, plastering contractors have begun their work. Bob Vila tries out plastering stilts. Then we visit a bed and breakfast in Williamstown, Massachusetts, where the homeowners used the B&B income to restore their 1770 farmhouse to museum quality. Back in Lexington, Bob Vila checks out the fireplace chimney pipe in the attic. Outside, the crew has built a faux chimney to hide the metal pipe and give it a brick facade.
10–17	"The Lexington Bed and Breakfast - 17"	1988
The guys erect a lamppost in the frontyard. Carpet underlayment is installed in the home office, while the crew also hangs burlap coverings on the walls. Bob Reed hangs suspended, acoustical tiles on the room's ceiling. Tom Wirth and Roger Cook watch the sod arrive and discuss grass blend and ground preparation before the sod is laid out.
10–18	"The Lexington Bed and Breakfast - 18"	1988
The crew installs a metal railing on the granite patio using hydrolic cement. We then visit a single-family home development in Aurora, Illinois, featuring houses so energy-efficient the builder guarantees that annual heating bills will not exceed $200.
10–19	"The Lexington Bed and Breakfast - 19"	1988
At the front of the house, Bob Vila watches Charlie McGongagle put up a permanent drain pipe, while John Silva installs a new storm door. In the master bedroom, master carpenter Norm Abram is busy trimming the windows, while Mary-Van is painting window sashes. In the basement, Bob Vila watches as general contractor Tom Silva levels the basement floor where the washer and dryer will be located using a plaster based compound. Tile is set in the upstairs bath.
10–20	"The Lexington Bed and Breakfast - 20"	1988
Bob Vila and electrical contractor Buddy Bisnaw discuss outlets in the kitchen. Plumbing and Heating expert Richard Trethewey accepts delivery of a new one-piece toilet and a pedestal sink. Then we visit the American Standard factory where these fixtures were manufactured. Back in Lexington, the crew sets in place wooden rain gutter that will divert water off the deck area.
10–21	"The Lexington Bed and Breakfast - 21"	1988
When we arrive at the jobsite, we find homeowners Jim and Mary-Van outside painting clapboards. Inside, our host meets the Sinek children who are painting the ceilings. The tiling contractors are hard at work in the wheelchair accessible and master bedrooms, while in the living room, plumbing and heating expert Richard Trethewey shows off the new baseboard heating system.
10–22	"The Lexington Bed and Breakfast - 22"	1988
The crew installs a new newel post on the main staircase. Then we tour the Morgan Door company, manufacturers of a true divided-light french doors. Back at the jobsite, Bob Vila and John Silva put finishing touches on the stairway.
10–23	"The Lexington Bed and Breakfast - 23"	1988
At the bed and breakfast's entrance, Bob Vila and flooring contractor Jeff Hosking discuss refinishing and patching the 80-year-old fir floor. In the new part of the house, the crew is installing a pre-finished oak flooring while a vinyl floor is laid in the kitchen. The kitchen cabinets have arrived, and Mary-Van and Bob Vila unpack one for a closer look. In the upstairs hall, master carpenter Norm Abram is working on a reading nook, placing bookcases and a seat he made earlier in his workshop.
10–24	"The Lexington Bed and Breakfast - 24"	1988
Bob Vila and general contractor Tom Silva are hard at work on the fireplace, mounting a new mantel and facing the surround with half-brick. We see construction of a man-made marble shower stall. The same material will be used for kitchen countertops. In the old part of the house, Jeff Hosking is trying to match the stain on the new fir flooring to that of the old. Bob Vila finds plumbing and heating expert Richard Trethewey installing fixtures in the wheelchair accessible bathroom, while master carpenter Norm Abram puts the finishing touches on the reading nook and general contractor Tom Silva installs pull-down attic stairways.
10–25	"The Lexington Bed and Breakfast - 25"	1988
The Corian countertops are installed in the kitchen. Bob Vila discusses appliances with General Electric appliance designer Bob Mundt. Bob Vila tests the stain-resistant carpet that's gone upstairs, and then meets with representatives from the bank that helped finance the renovations. Finally, master carpenter Norm Abram installs a vanity in the master bathroom.
10–26	"The Lexington Bed and Breakfast - 26"	February 23, 1989
Bob Vila and Joe Ruggiero, editor of Home magazine and an interior decorator, tour the finished house. Plumbing and Heating expert Richard Trethewey shows us the air conditioner, garbage disposal and shower door as they are installed. Alarm specialist Don Martini talks about the house's new system. The house tour ends with a farewell to homeowners Jim and Mary-Van, and so ends the 10th season of This Old House. Note: After 10 seasons as the host, Bob Vila says goodbye to This Old House.
