= List of This Old House episodes =

This Old House is an American home improvement media brand with television shows, a magazine and also a website, ThisOldHouse.com. The brand is headquartered in Stamford, CT. The television series airs on the American television network Public Broadcasting Service (PBS) as well on the streaming platform Roku and it follows remodeling projects of houses over a number of weeks. This Old House is produced by This Old House Ventures, Inc. with WGBH Boston as the PBS distributing station. Warner Bros. Domestic Television distributes the series to commercial television stations in syndication. Time Inc. launched This Old House magazine in 1995, focusing on home how-to, know-how and inspiration.

== Series overview ==
Season	Episodes	Originally released		Projects
Season	Episodes	First released	Last released	Projects
1	13	January 1, 1979	June 30, 1979	The Dorchester House
2	27	January 1, 1981	September 28, 1981	The Newton House
3	13	January 1, 1982	May 1, 1982	The Woburn House
4	26	May 15, 1982	December 7, 1982	The Arlington House
5	26	October 1, 1983	March 24, 1984	The Brookline House
6	26	October 5, 1984	March 29, 1985	Hidden Asset, Playground, A House of Green Leaves, Kitchen Kitsch, An Artful Apartment
7	26	October 10, 1985	April 3, 1986	The Newton Cottage, The Reading Ranch, The Melrose House, The Tampa House
8	26	October 16, 1986	April 9, 1987	The Reading House, The Brimfield House, The Phoenix House
9	26	January 1, 1987	September 15, 1987	The Westwood House, The Santa Barbara Bungalow
10	26	September 1, 1988	February 23, 1989	The Lexington Bed and Breakfast,
11	26	January 1, 1989	September 15, 1989	The Concord Barn, The Santa Fe House
12	26	September 1, 1990	March 22, 1991	The Jamaica Plain House, The New Orleans House
13	26	September 5, 1991	March 19, 1992	The Wayland House, The London House
14	26	January 1, 1992	September 15, 1992	The Lexington Ranch, The Miami House
15	26	September 2, 1993	March 24, 1994	The Belmont House, The Honolulu House
16	26	January 1, 1994	March 22, 1995	The Acton House, The Napa Valley House
17	26	September 3, 1995	March 23, 1996	The Salem House, The Savannah House
18	26	September 28, 1996	March 22, 1997	The Nantucket House, The Tucson House
19	26	September 27, 1997	March 21, 1998	The Milton House, The San Francisco House
20	26	September 26, 1998	March 20, 1999	The Watertown House, The Key West House
21	26	September 25, 1999	March 18, 2000	The Billerica House, The Santa Barbara House
22	26	September 23, 2000	March 17, 2001	The Charlestown House, The West Palm Beach House
23	26	September 22, 2001	March 16, 2002	The Manchester House
24	26	October 10, 2002	April 3, 2003	The Winchester House, The Lake Forest Dream Kitchen
25	26	October 11, 2003	April 1, 2004	The Concord Cottage, The Bermuda House
26	26	October 9, 2004	April 2, 2005	The Carlisle House
27	26	October 6, 2005	March 30, 2006	The Cambridge House, The Washington, D.C. House
28	26	October 5, 2006	March 29, 2007	The East Boston House, The Austin House
29	26	October 4, 2007	March 27, 2008	Newton Shingle-Style House, New Orleans Rebuilds
30	26	October 2, 2008	March 26, 2009	The Weston House, The New York City House
31	26	October 10, 2009	April 3, 2010	Newton Centre, The Roxbury House
32	26	October 7, 2010	March 31, 2011	The Auburndale House, Los Angeles House
33	26	October 6, 2011	March 29, 2012	The Bedford House, The Barrington Beach House
34	26	October 4, 2012	March 28, 2013	The Cambridge 2012 House, The Essex House
35	26	October 5, 2013	May 3, 2014	Jersey Shore Rebuilds, The Arlington Italianate House
36	26	October 4, 2014	May 30, 2015	The Charlestown 2014 House, Lexington Colonial, The Veteran's Special House Project
37	26	October 3, 2015	May 28, 2016	The Belmont Victorian House, The North Shore Farmhouse
38	26	October 1, 2016	June 3, 2017	Arlington Arts & Crafts, The Detroit House
39	26	October 7, 2017	June 2, 2018	Newton Generation NEXT House, The Charleston Houses 2018
40	26	October 6, 2018	June 27, 2019	The Jamestown Net Zero House, Brookline Mid-century Modern House
41	26	October 5, 2019	May 31, 2020	The Westerly Ranch House, Paradise Rebuilds, The Cape Ann House
42	30	October 4, 2020	September 23, 2021	Behind the Build, The Seaside Victorian Cottage, The Dorchester Triple Decker
43	39	September 30, 2021	August 4, 2022	The Concord Country Cape, The West Roxbury Victorian, Saratoga Legacy Restored
44	26	September 29, 2022	June 22, 2023	The Atlanta Postmaster's House, The Newburyport House, The Ipswich House
45	26	September 28, 2023	May 27, 2024	Lexington Modern, Glen Ridge Generational
46	26	September 26, 2024	May 29, 2025	Nashville Brick Cottage, Ridgewood Colonial Revival, Westford Historic Renovation
47	TBA	September 25, 2025	TBA	Carolina Comeback, Needham Suburban Victorian, Walpole Ranch with ADU

Note: Episodes are listed in the original broadcast order

- List of This Old House episodes (seasons 1–10)
- List of This Old House episodes (seasons 11–20)
- List of This Old House episodes (seasons 21–30)
- List of This Old House episodes (seasons 31–40)

== Season 41 (2019–20) ==
- Kevin O'Connor's seventeenth season as the host.
- Starting with this season, This Old House is now produced by WETA-TV in Washington, D.C.

No. in season	Title	Original release date
The Westerly Ranch House
41–01	"A Ranch Out Westerly"	October 6, 2019
41–02	"Chimney Down and Walls Up"	October 13, 2019
41–03	"The Open Concept"	October 20, 2019
41–04	"Raise a Second Story"	October 27, 2019
41–05	"Decking for Beginners"	November 3, 2019
41–06	"Return to Paradise"	November 10, 2019
41–07	"The Doors"	November 17, 2019
41–08	"Tanks for the Propane"	November 24, 2019
41–09	"Rockin' the Granite"	January 5, 2020
41–10	"Pining for Old Pine"	January 12, 2020
41–11	"Save the Flagpole"	January 19, 2020
41–12	"Seaside Transformation"	January 26, 2020
Paradise Rebuilds
41–13	"Paradise Lost"	February 2, 2020
41–14	"Out of the Ashes"	February 9, 2020
41–15	"No Pain No Gain"	February 16, 2020
41–16	"Paradise Strong"	February 23, 2020
The Cape Ann House
41–17	"Cape Ann Shingle Style"	March 29, 2020
41–18	"Between a Rock and Hardwood"	April 5, 2020
41–19	"Losing Our Truss"	April 12, 2020
41–20	"Hard Work Ahead"	April 19, 2020
41–21	"Shingled Out"	April 26, 2020
41–22	"Tiling is a Family Affair"	May 3, 2020
41–23	"Window on Restoration"	May 10, 2020
41–24	"Don’t Rip It, Restore It"	May 17, 2020
41–25	"Master Craftsmen"	May 24, 2020
41–26	"Move in Day"	May 31, 2020

== Season 42 (2020–21) ==
- Kevin O'Connor's eighteenth season as the host.
- Starting with this season, This Old House returns to the Do It Yourself (DIY) Network in cable reruns.

No. in season	Title	Original release date
Behind the Build
42–01	"Designing Kitchens"	October 4, 2020
42–02	"Factory Made"	October 11, 2020
42–03	"Memorable Makers"	October 18, 2020
42–04	"Anatomy of a Kitchen"	October 25, 2020
The Seaside Victorian Cottage
42–05	"Project Interrupted"	November 1, 2020
42–06	"New Light In Old Windows"	November 8, 2020
42–07	"Chimney Straightener"	November 15, 2020
42–08	"Back To Narragansett"	November 15, 2020
42–09	"Cottage Upgrading Old School"	January 3, 2021
42–10	"Cottage Outside Details"	January 10, 2021
42–11	"Cottage Design Elements"	January 17, 2021
42–12	"Pizza Time"	January 24, 2021
42–13	"Narragansett Windows"	January 31, 2021
42–14	"Cold Weather Landscape"	February 7, 2021
42–15	"Tommy In The Kitchen"	February 14, 2021
42–16	"A Queen Anne Revival"	February 21, 2021
The Dorchester Triple Decker
42–17	"Return To Dorchester"	April 4, 2021
42–18	"3 Decker Heaven"	April 11, 2021
42–19	"House Fire Reclaimation"	April 18, 2021
42–20	"Urban Oasis"	April 25, 2021
42–21	"A Project for Every Floor"	May 2, 2021
42–22	"Three of Everything"	May 9, 2021
42–23	"Finish Work Begins"	May 16, 2021
42–24	"Roof University"	May 23, 2021
42–25	"Almost Home"	May 30, 2021
42–26	"Our 3 Decker"	June 6, 2021
Extra Episodes
42–27	"Summer Special: Scandinavian Modern"	July 11, 2021
42–28	"Summer Special: Generation Next"	September 5, 2021
42–29	"Summer Special: Rebirth of Detroit"	September 19, 2021
42–30	"Summer Special: Return to Paradise"	September 23, 2021

== Season 43 (2021–22) ==
- Kevin O'Connor's nineteenth season as the host.

No. in season	Title	Original release date
The Concord Country Cape
43–01	"New England Cape"	September 30, 2021
43–02	"Saving What We Can"	October 7, 2021
43–03	"Fix the Foundation"	October 14, 2021
43–04	"Solid Foundation"	October 21, 2021
43–05	"Dormer Day"	October 28, 2021
43–06	"Tree Dr. House Call"	November 4, 2021
43–07	"Masonry Lessons"	November 11, 2021
43–08	"Roughing It"	November 18, 2021
43–09	"Focus on Framing"	November 25, 2021
43–10	"Planting for the Future"	December 16, 2021
43–11	"Smaller Is Better"	December 23, 2021
43–12	"Toasty Cars"	December 30, 2021
43–13	"Race to the Finish"	January 6, 2022
43–14	"Sunshine Power"	January 13, 2022
43–15	"Crafty Finishes"	January 20, 2022
43–16	"Cinderella Story"	January 27, 2022
The West Roxbury Victorian
43–17	"Small Town in a Big City"	February 3, 2022
43–18	"Pruning 101"	February 10, 2022
43–19	"Drainpipe Puzzle"	February 17, 2022
43–20	"Outdoor Oasis"	February 24, 2022
43–21	"Exploring Flooring"	March 17, 2022
43–22	"Father and Son"	March 24, 2022
43–23	"A Match Made Perfect"	March 31, 2022
43–24	"Boho Chic"	April 7, 2022
43–25	"Focus on Finishes"	April 14, 2022
43–26	"A Modern Victorian"	April 21, 2022
Saratoga Legacy Restored
43–27	"Tour of Saratoga Springs"	April 28, 2022
43–28	"New Vision"	May 5, 2022
43–29	"Old Woes"	May 12, 2022
43–30	"Secret Gardens"	May 19, 2022
43–31	"Raise the Roof"	May 26, 2022
43–32	"Up and Away"	June 2, 2022
43–33	"Old House New Supports"	June 23, 2022
43–34	"Neighbors on Ice"	June 30, 2022
43–35	"Amped Up"	July 7, 2022
43–36	"Watertight Doghouse Dormers"	July 14, 2022
43–37	"Smooth Finish"	July 21, 2022
43–38	"Pantry Problems"	July 28, 2022
43–39	"A Legacy Restored"	August 4, 2022

== Season 44 (2022–23) ==
- Kevin O'Connor's twentieth season as the host.
- First season without Norm Abram.

No. in season	Title	Original release date
Atlanta Postmaster's House
44–01	"Welcome To Atlanta"	September 29, 2022
44–02	"Unsafe Structures"	October 6, 2022
44–03	"School of HVAC"	October 13, 2022
44–04	"Cardboard Kitchen"	October 20, 2022
44–05	"Whole House Protection"	October 27, 2022
44–06	"Respecting the Old"	November 3, 2022
44–07	"Repointed and Planted"	November 10, 2022
44–08	"Families Meet"	November 17, 2022
Newburyport House
44–09	"Shipwrights and Sea Captains"	January 5, 2023
44–10	"Powering Through"	January 12, 2023
44–11	"Demo Find"	January 19, 2023
44–12	"Design Talk"	January 26, 2023
44–13	"Off-the-Shelf Custom Look"	February 2, 2023
44–14	"Bed Race"	February 9, 2023
Ipswich House
44–15	"This Really Old House"	March 23, 2023
44–16	"Secrets Behind the Wall"	March 30, 2023
44–17	"Prep-Work"	April 6, 2023
44–18	"Careful Considerations"	April 13, 2023
44–19	"Below Grade Plumbing"	April 20, 2023
44–20	"Rebuilding Centuries"	April 27, 2023
44–21	"Exposing Problems"	May 4, 2023
44–22	"First Things First"	May 11, 2023
44–23	"Factory Built"	May 18, 2023
44–24	"New Life"	May 25, 2023
44–25	"Look-Alike"	June 15, 2023
44–26	"A Period Restoration"	June 22, 2023

== Season 45 (2023–24) ==
- Kevin O'Connor's twenty-first season as the host.

No. in season	Title	Original release date
Lexington Modern
45–01	"On A Mission"	September 28, 2023
45–02	"Shore We Can"	October 5, 2023
45–03	"The Big Dig"	October 12, 2023
45–04	"Engineered For Accessibility"	October 19, 2023
45–05	"Gone Geo"	October 26, 2023
45–06	"Reworked and Rewired"	November 2, 2023
45–07	"Ramping Up"	November 9, 2023
45–08	"Drop in the Gutter"	November 16, 2023
45–09	"Phased Out"	January 4, 2024
45–10	"Seven Layer Floors"	January 11, 2024
45–11	"Electrical Bond"	January 18, 2024
45–12	"Upcycled"	January 25, 2024
45–13	"Install With Care"	February 1, 2024
45–14	"All in the Family"	February 8, 2024
45–15	"Judgement Day"	February 15, 2024
45–16	"Accessible Made Modern"	February 22, 2024
Glen Ridge Generational
45–17	"Multi-Generational"	March 28, 2024
45–18	"Vintage"	April 4, 2024
45–19	"Small But Mighty"	April 11, 2024
45–20	"QR Construction"	April 18, 2024
45–21	"Roughed In"	April 25, 2024
45–22	"Next Level Tight"	May 2, 2024
45–23	"A Breath of Fresh Air"	May 9, 2024
45–24	"Test and Approved"	May 16, 2024
45–25	"Spring Forward"	May 23, 2024
45–26	"Next Generation Victorian"	May 27, 2024

== Season 46 (2024–25) ==
No. in season	Title	Original release date
Nashville Brick Cottage
46–01	"Welcome to Music City, USA"	September 26, 2024
46–02	"Moving Day"	October 3, 2024
46–03	"Grounded"	October 10, 2024
46–04	"A Grand Time At The Opry"	October 17, 2024
46–05	"Sustainable Siding"	October 24, 2024
46–06	"Vince Gill's Nashville"	October 31, 2024
46–07	"Shelter from the Storm"	November 7, 2024
46–08	"Southern Hospitality"	November 14, 2024
Ridgewood Colonial Revival
46–09	"Ridgewood Revival"	January 2, 2025
46–10	"Swiss Mix"	January 9, 2025
46–11	"Colonial Revival Revived"	January 16, 2025
46–12	"Walled in Science"	January 23, 2025
46–13	"The Kitchen Front"	January 30, 2025
46–14	"Rocking Fountain"	February 6, 2025
46–15	"Sugar Maple Revival"	February 12, 2025
46–16	"Modern Flare"	February 20, 2025
Westford Historic Renovation
46–17	"Welcome to Westford"	March 27, 2025
46–18	"Under a New Roof"	April 3, 2025
46–19	"Heavy Metal"	April 10, 2025
46–20	"Abating the Old, Seeding the New"	April 17, 2025
46–22	"Side Hustle"	May 1, 2025
46–23	"Gutted and Rewired"	May 8, 2025
46–24	"A Family Affair"	May 15, 2025
46–25	"Mural, Mural on the Wall"	May 22, 2025
46–26	"A Historical Gem Once Again"	May 29, 2025

== Season 47 (2025–26) ==
No. in season	Title	Original release date
Carolina Comeback
47–01	"Asheville Rebuilds"	September 25, 2025
47–02	"Rising Out of the Muck"	October 2, 2025
47–03	"All Clear"	October 9, 2025
47–04	"Waterproof Work"	October 16, 2025
47–05	"Out of the Mountains"	October 23, 2025
47–06	"Community Carpenters"	October 30, 2025
47–07	"Boulder Dash"	November 6, 2025
47–08	"Bricks, Blinds and Brews"	November 13, 2025
47–09	"Silt and Stone"	January 1, 2026
47–11	"Coming Home"	January 15, 2026
Needham Suburban Victorian
47–12	"Needed in Needham"	January 22, 2026
47–13	"Pouring It On"	January 29, 2026
47–14	"Reduce, Reside, Recycle"	February 5, 2026
47–15	"Getting Our Ducts in a Row"	February 12, 2026
47–16	"Trim and Proper"	February 19, 2026
47–17	"Foot Traffic"	March 26, 2026
47–18	"Going Through Customs"	April 2, 2026
47–19	"Everything Old Is New Again"	April 9, 2026
47–20	"Let It Show"	April 16, 2026
Walpole Ranch with ADU
