= List of This Old House episodes (seasons 21–30) =

This Old House is an American home improvement media brand with television shows, a magazine and a website, ThisOldHouse.com. The brand is headquartered in Stamford, CT. The television series airs on the American television station Public Broadcasting Service (PBS) and follows remodeling projects of houses over a number of weeks.

Season	Episodes	Originally released	
Season	Episodes	First released	Last released
1	13	January 1, 1979	June 30, 1979
2	27	January 1, 1981	September 28, 1981
3	13	January 1, 1982	May 1, 1982
4	26	May 15, 1982	December 7, 1982
5	26	October 1, 1983	March 24, 1984
6	26	October 5, 1984	March 29, 1985
7	26	October 10, 1985	April 3, 1986
8	26	October 16, 1986	April 9, 1987
9	26	January 1, 1987	September 15, 1987
10	26	September 1, 1988	February 23, 1989
11	26	January 1, 1989	September 15, 1989
12	26	September 1, 1990	March 22, 1991
13	26	September 5, 1991	March 19, 1992
14	26	January 1, 1992	September 15, 1992
15	26	September 2, 1993	March 24, 1994
16	26	January 1, 1994	March 22, 1995
17	26	September 3, 1995	March 23, 1996
18	26	September 28, 1996	March 22, 1997
19	26	September 27, 1997	March 21, 1998
20	26	September 26, 1998	March 20, 1999
21	26	September 25, 1999	March 18, 2000
22	26	September 23, 2000	March 17, 2001
23	26	September 22, 2001	March 16, 2002
24	26	October 10, 2002	April 3, 2003
25	26	October 11, 2003	April 1, 2004
26	26	October 9, 2004	April 2, 2005
27	26	October 6, 2005	March 30, 2006
28	26	October 5, 2006	March 29, 2007
29	26	October 4, 2007	March 27, 2008
30	26	October 2, 2008	March 26, 2009
31	26	October 10, 2009	April 3, 2010
32	26	October 7, 2010	March 31, 2011
33	26	October 6, 2011	March 29, 2012
34	26	October 4, 2012	March 28, 2013
35	26	October 5, 2013	May 3, 2014
36	26	October 4, 2014	May 30, 2015
37	26	October 3, 2015	May 28, 2016
38	26	October 1, 2016	June 3, 2017
39	26	October 7, 2017	June 2, 2018
40	26	October 6, 2018	June 27, 2019

Note: Episodes are listed in the original broadcast order

== Season 21 (1999–2000) ==
- Steve Thomas's eleventh season as the host.
- Starting with this season, This Old House and The New Yankee Workshop go online under the renamed "www.pbs.org/wgbh/thisoldhouse".

No. in season	Title	Original release date
The Billerica House
21–01	"The Billerica House - 1"	September 25, 1999
The 21st season of This Old House kicks off with a visit to Chub Whitten's Colonial home in Ipswitch, Massachusetts. Then, it was a burned wreck; now, a year later, it is impeccably restored. After Dick Silva talks about the fire, he leads a tour the ruins of the house. Then Steve meets with Dick and his wife Sandra to discuss their plans for the future, which are to rebuild on the same spot. Finally, we see the basement heating plant which investigators believe may have been the source of the fire.
21–02	"The Billerica House - 2"	October 2, 1999
We visit the Billerica Fire Dept. to hear what it was like to fight the Silva fire, and how it might have been prevented or at least kept more manageable. Back at the house, our host meets with the Silvas' insurance agent, who explains the benefits of having a "guaranteed replacement cost" endorsement on one's homeowner's policy - it provides for rebuilding after a complete loss. Public insurance adjuster (and former This Old House homeowner) Dick Benedetti shows us some of the process by which he is writing up the insurance claim for the Silvas. Architect Chris Dallmus begins to discuss the design of the new structure with homeowners Dick and Sandra Silva, while outside a perc test is run for the new septic system and landscape contractor Roger Cook takes an inventory of the plants that did and did not survive the fire.
21–03	"The Billerica House - 3"	October 9, 1999
Tom recounts the day the machines came to tear down Dick and Sandra's old house. All that's left is a hole in the ground. Arborist Matt Foti and his crew take down two 75-year-old Eastern white pines damaged by the fire and cut them into 2x10 planks on a mobile saw mill. An environmental testing crew arrives to take soil samples, as the fire department suspects fuel oil was spilled on site during the fire. If tests shows that concentrations are high enough, a mitigation will be required by the state's department of environmental protection. Another team arrives to re-establish the height of the water table, digging a hole by hand, to satisfy the town's building department that the foundation's proposed elevations legal. Architect Chris Dallmus shows us a model of the house-to-be, a four-bedroom, three-and-a-half-bath structure whose style Chris describes as "village Victorian," modelled after some houses he found in Billerica's town center.
21–04	"The Billerica House - 4"	October 16, 1999
A full month after our last time on site, the foundation is just being completed, the construction schedule having fallen victim to a three-week soil cleanup process. With the complex, 30-corner foundation walls up, it's time for a proactive termite treatment beneath the slab, using a new class of chemical, that rather than acting as a barrier, allows termites to enter the treated zone unknowingly, upon which they die. Its continuing efficacy in the ground has been proven for seven years and counting. Before the slab is poured, the crew installs an underlayment of 2" styrofoam insulation and a clip-in system for radiant heat - at half the price it was only a few years ago, Richard insists we put the tubing in every slab we pour, even if it isn't used right away. Then Steve takes viewers to a Florida house built by a major insurance company to showcase tips for loss mitigation - everything from sprinklers to kick-proof door jambs. Back at the site, the slab is poured, and homeowners Dick and Sandra Silva try to choose a brick veneer for the new foundation.
21–05	"The Billerica House - 5"	October 23, 1999
Homeowner Dick Silva gives a tour of the newly framed up first floor, and Tom Silva shows some of the hallmarks of a good framing system. In the basement, our master carpenter explains how the floor joists meet two steel beams to maximize headroom, while Steve and crew held a metal post in position. We then visit the Florida factory where the wooden I-beams used in the house's floor are made - 25 miles' worth a day. Back on site, architect Chris Dallmus explains some of the strategies he's using to reduce the mass and appearance of the proposed three-car garage. Finally, framing contractor Eric Machemer and crew raise the last of the first-floor walls and the building begins to climb into the sky.
21–06	"The Billerica House - 6"	October 30, 1999
Homeowner Dick Silva gives a tour of the framed and sheated house and reports that he and Sandra have received a very satisfactory insurance settlement on the structure; the settlement on the contents awaits a complete inventory. We pay a visit to the Massachusetts Firefighting Academy, where firefighters learn hands-on the techniques that save lives and buildings. Back at the house, the crew discusses the fine points of shed dormers, while framing contractor Eric Pierce puts one together in a fast and professional way. Mason Lenny Belliveau shows us his system: veneer brick on the concrete foundation face, a matching full brick for the chimney.
21–07	"The Billerica House - 7"	November 6, 1999
The new windows have arrived. They're made from an extruded composive of PVC and sawdust, and we visit Minnesota to see the factory. The crew puts up corner trim using two layers of cementitious board, while mason Lenny Belliveau shows us a new tool that extrudes cement grout like icing for a cake. Lenny forms the new hearth, and the guys move on to installing one of the new windows.
21–08	"The Billerica House - 8"	November 13, 1999
Norm and Tom take over Dick's Quonset hut to set up a woodworking shop, forcing Dick to take his restored 1931 Ford Roadster pickup truck up to the new garage. He gives us a tour, then we meet James Crowe, inventor of a synthetic slate made from recycled automotive rubber and industrial plastic trimmings. Cast in molds, it almost exactly like the real thing, yet is lighter, less fragile, and a quarter of the cost. Roofer Mark Mulloy shows how it's going on the building and predicts that, if it lasts as long as Crowe claims (a minimum of 50 years), it will be a real hit. In the workshop, tool technician Scott Box helps the guys set up and calibrate the new table saw, shaper, planner, joiner, and chop saw, while Richard Trethewey shows us the factors that determined the layout of the house's waste pipes. Finally, the guys put the finishing touches on an assembly table, the first piece to be made in the new on-site workshop.
21–09	"The Billerica House - 9"	November 20, 1999
The local electric utility is on site to bring power across the street to a new pole positioned in a discrete spot along the front edge of the Silva's property. Far cheaper than digging beneath the road, this method will still allow for electricity, cable, and telephone wires to be undergrounded to the house, avoiding unsightly overhead wires. Inside the house, kitchen designer Phil Mossgraber and Sandra Silva are going over her wish list for the kitchen; our host joins them as Phil suggests eliminating a closet in the mudroom and putting in a service door to the dining room, a good idea Sandy embraces. Richard Trethewey is on site with the head of the American Fire Sprinkler Association, seeing the first steps in designing a sprinkler system for the house, while our host visits Underwriters Laboratories to see how they test various materials relating to fire and fire safety. In the workshop, our master carpenter gives the machines a test by fashioning a flat-panel cabinet door for Dick and Sandy to consider for their new kitchen.
21–10	"The Billerica House - 10"	November 27, 1999
As Norm sets up the table saw to make a sample raised-panel door for the Silvas to consider for their new kitchen, our host sees Tom's system for flashing windows: a layer of waterproof membrane covered with a custom gap of side-bent lead-coated copper. The cementitious clapboards - factory primed and first-coated - go on to great acclaim, and Steve meets with landscape designer Stephanie Hubbard to lay out the challenges facing the project: entries to the property, views from inside, transitions among vastly different elevations.In the basement, master electrician Allen Gallant is working on one of two main panels. Turning down his rechargeable jobsite boombox, he shows off a new breaker called an arc-fault arrestor, which detects the kind of electrical arcs in frayed cords and worn wires that can cause fires. Tom Silva shows us the first of the porch decks: he's using ipe, a Brazilian hardwood, and giving it a clean look by fastening it down using only a marine adhesive and an absolute minimum of stainless steel trim nails. Out back in the workshop, Norm is routing out a rabbet on one of the sample doors and takes viewers on a tour of the factory where the router was made. He also shows us a jig he's made to cut raised panels.
21–11	"The Billerica House - 11"	December 4, 1999
The site is abuzz as subcontractors hurry to complete their in-wall work before the insulation truck arrives. Tom Silva gives a tour of the wires, pipes, conduits and ducts, while Paul Somerson, editor-in-chief of PC Computing magazine, makes recommendations about the proper wiring, placement and configuration of the house's computer system. Kitchen designer Phil Mossgraber and homeowner Sandra Silva are down to the final decisions in the kitchen - natural fir cabinets, linoleum floor, counters of a material called kirkstone and they debate the merits of two different island designs. The sprinkler system is roughed in, and sprinkler specialist Jack Viola shows our host where the water comes in and (hopefully never) comes out. Media systems designer shows us his plans for outfitting the living room with a surround-sound television package; it includes the rather unorthodox replacement placement of a plasma-screen TV in the wall over the mantle. Finally, landscape designer Stephanie Hubbard unveils his plan for the property, which includes moving the Silvas' beloved frog pond.
21–12	"The Billerica House - 12"	December 11, 1999
We arrive at the house to find the last of the wallboard shipment being loaded into the basement. In the rest of the house, it's already hung and plastering has begun, homeowner Dick Silva gives a tour of the top floor, where the rooms are taking on their final shape. The building has been insulated with an open-cell polyicynene foam, earlier Steve met with its Canadian inventor. Tom and Norm are in the workshop building the last of the kitchen and bath cabinet carcasses, while landscape contractor Roger Cook works with stonemason Roger Hopkins to shape granite steps for a new walkway up from the driveway. Tom shows Steve the cementitious shingle panels being used on the garage walls, and metal fabricator Tom McGregor works on a lead-coated-copper flat-seam roof over the kitchen bay window. Finally, Tom and Norm build a fir face-frame for the bathroom vanity using pocket-screw technology.
21–13	"The Billerica House - 13"	December 18, 1999
Landscape contractor Roger Cook and his crew begin to install a stone wall along the driveway, using a split stone from North Carolina that is available at home centers nationwide. Roger shows us his method of building with geotextile and proper drainage to ensure the wall won't succumb to frost heaves over time. Inside, Tom Silva is putting in the first of the new interior doors - made from medium-density fiberboard (MDF) in the traditional panel-stile-rail way, they keep the crisp details of a wood door, yet do not expand and contract like wood. For custom panel patterns like ours, they are less than half the price of wood and are delivered in a mere two weeks. Painters Ron and Greg Byers are applying latex paint to the house's exterior using an airless sprayer, and our host takes viewers to the factory that made expanded urethane millwork we're using inside and out. Homeowner Dick Silva shows us some of the schemes he's considering to hide the flat-screen TV over the mantle when it's not in use. In the workshop, our master carpenter works to build heavy-duty cabinet drawers with slide hardware to match.
21–14	"The Billerica House - 14"	December 25, 1999
We arrive to find Rich in the basement, where the forced air unit for first-floor heating and cooling hangs; the main source of first-floor heat, however, will be radiant floor heat, made more effective with aluminum mounting plates and a joist-bay foil insulation that reflects heat back up into the floor above. Out front, Roger Cook shows us the options he had in edging the landscape's walkways - he chosen steel, which is long-lasting, flexible, and nearly invisible. Out in the workshop, Tom Silva is spraying fast-drying lacquer out the new cabinet doors, while our master carpenter is in the New Yankee Workshop turning legs for the kitchen island. This Old House magazine editor-in-chief Donna Sapolin tours around the house to explain the interior design challenges, and then visits a nearby furniture showroom to see some of the design work that has been done for the Silvas' new house.
21–15	"The Billerica House - 15"	January 1, 2000
Master electrician Allen Gallant shows us the workings of the new emergency power generator, a quiet natural-gas-powered unit that will supply the house's "essential services" (heating plant, refrigerator, well, some lights) with electricity in the event of a blackout. Beautiful wooden garage doors go in, and we get a tour of their construction, installation and operation. In the kitchen, Dick Silva begins installing the new cabinets, while our master carpenter visits a converted woolen mill, where a local cabinet maker is building the Silvas an entertainment center out of rare and beautiful tiger oak. Back on site, inventor John Crowley shows us his line of "kit of parts" wainscoting.
21–16	"The Billerica House - 16"	January 8, 2000
Paving contractor Don Sloan shows Roger Cook a few different ways to pave the drive: plain black asphalt with crushed stone rolled into a liquid asphalt binder. Around back, Roger shows us the drywell and crushed stone he and his crew installed to handle any excess water on the north side of the building, while inside Tom Silva gives our host a ride on the kitchen island's new pull-out pastry board, supported by 300-pound rated slides. Then it's off to Kirkcaldy, Scotland, to see real linoleum being made the same way it's been made for the past 100 years, with the same natural ingredients. Back on site, Richard Trethewey gives the new a/c chiller a test, proving just how quiet these machines have become. Downstairs he explains the iron-removal unit that will handle the house's well water. Finally, Jean and Bob Sparkes spray on a hydroseed lawn, just in time, before the water cools much.
21–17	"The Billerica House - 17"	January 15, 2000
Landscape designer Stephanie Hubbard oversees the placement of the new plants and trees with Roger Cook, while inside our master carpenter talks to mill owner Charlie Wilson about the vertical grain loblolly pine and quartersawn white oak flooring he's supplied to the job. Meanwhile, Steve visits a nearby shop to learn the ins and outs of Oriental carpets from expert Steve Boodakian; on hand is Jampa Tenzing, a Tibetan carpet weaver and repairer, who is giving in-house demonstrations. Back on site, Tom Silva hangs the new front door, a thick, custom mahogany unit with hand-cast period brass hardware. Then we tour of This Old House magazine's just-completed Dream House, a Robert A. M. Stern-designed Shingle-style home in Connecticut. Back on site, the guys check out the ongoing wainscoting installation, then hang the dining room's "hidden" door, using hidden hinges, then discuss the latest plans to use cabinetry to hide the living room's flat screen TV when it's not in use.
21–18	"The Billerica House - 18"	January 22, 2000
Steve arrives to see wooden shutter maker Peter Malone and crew installing shutters on the front facade, using traditional pintle hinges and shutter dogs. Inside, master electrician Allen Gallant shows him the reproduction lighting fixtures he's hanging in the foyer and bathrooms, while the guys install the ingenious TV-hiding cabinetry built for the family room. Cabinetmaker Aaron Barth brings in the magnificent tiger tiger-oak cabinet he's built to hold (and hide) the audio/visual equipment. Outside, our host helps carpenter Chris Hastings hang a mail-order copper gutter system to head off potential water problems at the house's rear entry, where several roof planes converge. Tom Silva begins to install the main staircase's treads and risers. Richard Trethewey tests the whirlpool bath and shows us the bathroom fixtures, which have no-maintenance ceramic valves inside and allow the homeowner to change out handles and faucets without needed to replace the fixture. In the kitchen, tiler Joe Ferrante is installing the Kirkstone countertops; the black-green material is quarried in the United Kingdom, is harder than marble and softer than granite, and costs about the same as granite. In the laundry, we check out the new linoleum floor, the fir beadboard, the full-size stackable "tumblewash" washer/dryer units, and the cast-iron Victorian shelf brackets.
21–19	"The Billerica House - 19"	January 29, 2000
The final two days in Billerica find Dick returning his beloved Model A truck to the new garage, which is nice and warm thanks to a natural-gas heater. Roger Cook and his crew are rolling out a bit of sod in the back yard, and Roger gives us a look at how he covered up the septic tank, moved the frog and replaced the old pavers around the pool with some beautiful granite coping by Roger Hopkins. Inside, oriental carpet expert Steve Boodakian extolls the virtues of a central vacuuming system - it makes vacuuming so easy that people tend to do it more often, which greatly extends a carpet's life. The front stairs runner receives its decorative brass hold-down rods. PC Computing magazine editor Paul Somerson reviews the house's computer set-up, which starts with a high-speed cable connection to the internet. A "hub" allows multiple Internet connections throughout the house, so all computers in the house to share any peripherals, like a printer or fax. The final pieces of linoleum go down in the kitchen, and we get an end-of-the-workday lesson on arming the security system, which unlike the old house's is connected to a central monitoring station. The next day, the guys admire the etched glass installed in the front door last the prior evening, then we tour the decorated house with This Old House magazine's Donna Sapolin, looking at each room through the eyes of a design editor who has a picture spread to put together. We see, and hear, the powerful yet nearly invisible audio/video system, including the remarkable flat-screen TV above the fireplace. At the closing party, Dick and Sandy show off their just-obtained certificate of occupancy, which means they'll be into their new home by Christmas.
The Santa Barbara House
21–20	"The Santa Barbara House - 01"	February 5, 2000
Steve and Norm arrive in style, by sailboat, at This Old House's winter project location: Santa Barbara. Homeowner Jan Winford has waited 25 years to expand her tiny 1907 California bungalow on a beautiful lot overlooking the city's historic downtown and the Pacific Ocean beyond. With a solid team of architect Jerry Zimmer and general contractor Steve Crawford, she plans to add a second floor master suite, expand the kitchen, and reshape the entire front facade, with an emphasis of the Craftsman style, all on a budget of $200,000.
21–21	"The Santa Barbara House - 02"	February 12, 2000
The guys revisit This Old House's winter 1988 Santa Barbara project: Dave and Susan Dickenson's bungalow. Upon arrival at This Old House's current jobsite, they find the building reduced to a few walls and a forest of studs. As we learn from general contractor Steve Crawford, the building had to be deconstructed and reinforced before it could support the new addition. Richard Trethewey checks out the plastic water piping, along with a new "reversible" brass fitting system. Then we tour town with historian Neal Graffy, who reveals how a devastating earthquake in 1925 gave birth to the Mediterranean Revival city that stands today.
21–22	"The Santa Barbara House - 03"	February 19, 2000
We review the progress the crew has made in reframing the expansion of the Santa Barbara bungalow. Then we check out the new garage, built to comply with city code, and the new, synthetic sandstone front walkway. We then go aboard one of the oil rigs that dot Santa Barbara's spectacular coastline to learn how the oil industry has shaped the area's economy and environment.
21–23	"The Santa Barbara House - 04"	February 26, 2000
We check out the framing of the Santa Barbara bungalow's new second-story master suite - and take in its stunning views of the Pacific. Then we head off to a small art-tile kiln in nearby Ojai where Jan's Arts-and-Crafts style backsplash, counter and fireplace tiles are being made. General contractor Steve Crawford discusses the aesthetic challenges he faces in giving the exterior an authentic historic look. City fire codes that against the threat of wildfire meant that he will have to use modern, non-flammable building materials such as Class A fire-rated asphalt roofing and fiber-cement sidewall shingles.
21–24	"The Santa Barbara House - 05"	March 4, 2000
We check out the new custom windows, which feature cherry, wood interiors and true divided lights. Then we meet landscape architect Susan Van Atta who reviews her design for the historically sensitive landscape that includes plants native to California. Then Steve meets with Paul Duchscherer, design expert and author of three books on Arts-and-Crafts style, who was enlisted to ensure that the new interior and exterior colors, finishes and decorative details stay true to the home's period character. Duchscherer then takes us to the neighboring town of Ojai for a tour of a spectacular Greene and Greene home, which epitomizes American Arts-and-Crafts style.
21–25	"The Santa Barbara House - 06"	March 11, 2000
The countdown to completion of the Santa Barbara bungalow renovation begins. The elements of the new kitchen arrive, as does the magnificent oak front entrance. The focal point of the house - the fireplace - is given a wonderful facelift with handcrafted Arts-and-Crafts style tiles. And finally, we make a trek up the West Coast to a Portland, Oregon, factory that produces exact replicas vintage lighting fixtures.
21–26	"The Santa Barbara House - 07"	March 18, 2000
Homeowner Jan Winford finally realizes her dream of 25 years - the renovation of her 1907 bungalow - thanks in part to This Old House. The guys return to Santa Barbara after a couple of weeks of construction have gone by and are amazed to find Jan's bungalow transformed with a classic Arts-and-Crafts style detailing. Norm congratulates general contractor Steve Crawford on squeezing an immensely ambitious project into such a limited time-frame before they both join the crew at the traditional wrap party, as This Old House wraps up its 21st season.

== Season 22 (2000–01) ==
- Steve Thomas's twelfth season as the host.

No. in season	Title	Original release date
The Charlestown House
22–01	"The Charlestown House - 1"	September 23, 2000
The 22nd season kicks off from the main deck of the beautifully restored USS Constitution, which is docked in Boston Harbor's historic Charlestown Navy Yard. After disembarking, they trek up to Bunker Hill, to learn about the site of the famous Revolutionary War battle and the story of the monument's construction. Along the way, they pass the some classic examples of the 17th and 18th century urban architecture, many of which have been recently restored. Soon thereafter, Steve is given a walking tour of Charleston by local realtor Frank Celeste, who tells a remarkable story about his rise, fall and recent rebirth as one of Boston's most sought-after communities. Celeste then gives him a lead on a young couple who recently purchased a three-story 1865 Second-Empire style brick townhouse on famed Bunker Hill Street, and who are in need of some renovation help. Steve agrees to meet with Dan and Heather Beliveau to learn more about their dreams.
22–02	"The Charlestown House - 2"	September 30, 2000
Host Steve Thomas opens the show from City Square Park, a Charlestown, Massachusetts, landmark that once was overshadowed (literally) by elevated train tracks and highways. A citizen-led group succeeded in having them removed and replaced with a beautiful public park. Steve interviews Rich Johnson who played a key role in this urban revitalization project. Then he heads to the subject house to meet with homeowner Dan Beliveau and architect Jack French to discuss their goals and ideas for the renovation. Afterwards, Jack takes Steve to visit one of his firm's projects, a decommissioned Catholic school that was converted into condominiums. We then visit with the homeowner of a beautifully restored, neighboring townhouse to learn more about her approach.
22–03	"The Charlestown House - 3"	October 7, 2000
The Charlestown townhouse can be found on the route of one of the country's oldest parades, the Bunker Hill Day Parade. Host Steve Thomas gets the scoop on the parade's 225-year-old history and its annual events from the locals. Afterwards, he checks in of the flurry of activity at the jobsite including Tom's removal of the old brick patio and the asbestos-abatement crew's work in the kitchen and basement. Later, Steve meets with homeowner Dan Beliveau and project architect Jack French to review the two options for expanding the structure and the building permit and zoning approvals needed. We review choices for improving the old windows, and then Tom and Richard discuss the challenges of updating the home's cooling and heating systems. Finally, Dan Beliveau rolls up his sleeves and works alongside the crew to demolish the old kitchen.
22–04	"The Charlestown House - 4"	October 14, 2000
Steve Thomas can be found opening the show from Boston Harbor again, this time aboard the STS Sagres, the stunning Portuguese entry in the Tall Ships Parade. Meanwhile, viewers check out the towering scaffolding around the Charlestown townhouse. When Steve arrives at the job site, Dan takes him on a tour of the gutted kitchen and baths that reveal the full interior space available for construction. What exactly Dan and Heather will be able to build in this space remains undecided, as Steve finds out when he visits Boston's Inspectional Services Department with architect Jack French. While some parts of the promised building plan are approved, others are flagged for a zoning review. In the basement, we find Tom shooting lines to create a level new floor before prepping the area for the pouring of concrete. Heating and plumbing expert Richard Trethewey is able to shed light on the pipes, explaining how PVC pipes can line pre-existing clay pipes, eliminating the need to cut through.
22–05	"The Charlestown House - 5"	October 21, 2000
Hard rain doesn't appear to hold back progress on the Charlestown renovation. Dan climbs the new scaffolding to take in the gray view of the city and to discuss the issues of putting a roof deck on the building's hip roof. Meanwhile, host Steve Thomas learns about filling in a flue channel, which is a structural element of the house before finding out the prognosis of the plaster from preservationist Rory Brennan. Richard takes Heather to a nearby plumbing salvage yard to see if owner Fran Fahey might be interested in swapping a classic clawfoot tub and pedestal sink for the fancy radiators her house no longer needs. The work on the basement hits a milestone as the new floor is poured, and Tom and Dan waste no time laying out and framing in the new rooms in the basement once the floor is set.
22–06	"The Charlestown House - 6"	October 28, 2000
Steve and Tom commute to the Charlestown job site in style - about Tom's boat. They arrive on site to find landscape contractor Roger Cook and his crew removing the massive granite curbing along the back patio and the old concrete steps at the rear entrance. In the process they unearth an old gravestone. Chimney specialist Mark Shaub gives a report on state of the home's four fireplaces and the staggering costs involved in getting them all to work. Steve helps Tom put in new floor joists, before taking viewers to visit one of the Charlestown's oldest residents, the Navy Yard.
22–07	"The Charlestown House - 7"	November 4, 2000
Host Steve Thomas recaps with homeowner Dan Beliveau the recent Boston Zoning Board of Appeals decision that gives the go-ahead for the project's master bath addition and roof deck. With approval in hand, the work commences in earnest. This Old House plumbing and heating expert Richard Trethewey shows Steve how the new HVAC duct system will be zoned to provide maximum comfort. Historic conservator Andrea Gilmore visits the project house and assesses the condition of its brownstone lintels.
22–08	"The Charlestown House - 8"	November 11, 2000
The work continues in Charlestown as steps are taken to make the fireplace and chimneys safe for wood burning fires. Our master carpenter and general contractor Tom Silva install some of the handsome new windows. Throughout the townhouse, the wiring and rough plumbing continues. Host Steve Thomas and homeowner Dan Beliveau visit a kitchen design showroom to check out the options for outfitting the townhouse's two kitchens - the rental unit's and owners'.
22–09	"The Charlestown House - 9"	November 18, 2000
The Beliveaus' townhouse affords a few views of Boston Harbor, which is a working port. Ships of all shapes and sizes steam past Charlestown everyday, and regularly dock in the channel. Heating and plumbing expert Richard Trethewey goes aboard one of the harbor's frequent visitors, a liquid-natural-gas tanker, to learn more about the vessel operates. Meanwhile, at the townhouse, work continues on the Beliveaus' prime viewing spot, their roof deck. Seeking some inspiration for its design, Steve visits a spectacular roof deck nearby.
22–10	"The Charlestown House - 10"	November 25, 2000
The basement of This Old House's Charlestown project continues to be transformed into two bedrooms for the rental unit. To ensure the space remains warm and damp-free, close-cell foam is sprayed against the exterior walls. Upstairs, in the Beliveaus' living room, host Steve Thomas meets with plaster restorer Rory Brennan to learn about the process of saving the old horsehair plaster and vintage ornamental details.
22–11	"The Charlestown House - 11"	December 2, 2000
The transformation of the Charlestown project house is coming along according to plan, including the metal spiral staircase that will be installed on the exterior of the rear ell and run from the Beliveaus' new kitchen to street level. Meanwhile, landscaping contractor Roger Cook and landscape architect David Hawk begin the process of creating two private outdoor spaces, one for the renters and one for the Beliveaus.
22–12	"The Charlestown House - 12"	December 9, 2000
The Charlestown project house will retain many of its original 1865 details, but many of the crumbling brownstone lintels will not be among them. While mason Lenny Beliveau installs new cast stone lintels, host Steve Thomas visits the Rhode Island yard where they are made to learn about the materials and casting techniques. Roofing contractor Mark Mulloy explains the intricacies of reroofing the mansard as he and his crew finish their work on the house.
22–13	"The Charlestown House - 13"	December 16, 2000
The Charlestown project continues to be transformed into two distinct living spaces, the rental apartment and the Beliveaus' home. As the plastering nears completion, host Steve Thomas learns some tips for ensuring a smooth plaster finish. Meanwhile, out at The New Yankee Workshop, our master carpenter can be found working on a built-in china cabinet for the Beliveaus' dining room, which will be similar to the original found in the rental unit.
22–14	"The Charlestown House - 14"	December 23, 2000
Steve sees landscaping progress with Roger, including a tumbled concrete wall that's almost done, pavers going down. Inside, Steve finds Tommy, who gives him the plaster report. Steve sees how John Dee is transforming the plain white double doors into dead-ringers for the existing stained woodwork, which he's cleaned with a rub-on, wipe-off product. Then we see the doors made at a medium density fiberboard (MDF) factory in Denver. Richard meets the gas company man connecting the house to the street, and by policy, firing off a gas appliance: our new furnace.
22–15	"The Charlestown House - 15"	December 30, 2000
Steve arrives to find a temporary metal door in the entry and goes in to see how John Dee is stripping and refinishing the front entry doors. Dan installs a pair of exterior shutters, custom-sized in solid PVC with a 10-year factory job and hardware for $450. We then visit the workshop of the USS Constitution. Next our master carpenter helps Tom trim out one of the new egress windows in the basement with custom molding supplied by our trusty Cambridge millwork company. Meanwhile, Steve helps Rory Brennan install our new plaster medallion and then sees the new bamboo flooring go down in the rental kitchen and finds out what it is, where it's from, how it's made and what it costs.
22–16	"The Charlestown House - 16"	January 6, 2001
The single-lever kitchen faucet is one of the most familiar pieces of American plumbing. This Old House plumbing and heating expert Richard Trethewey tours the state-of-the-art factory where this tried and true fixture is made. Back at the Charlestown townhouse, progress continues on the landscaping, as Roger Cook accepts delivery of the new plants. Inside the house, it's a big day for the kitchens as both sets of cabinets, one for the rental unit, and one for the Beliveau's home, arrive on the job site. Steve arrives at the job site to find Roger Cook and crew unloading the plants from the nursery truck. Roger and landscape architect David Hawk then discussion their positioning and planting. Inside, Dan applying thinned-down joint compound to front stairs wall prior to paint crew's arrival. In the owners' kitchen, our master carpenter finds Eric Rikeman checking on the new cabinet's installation and discusses some of its features. Steve finds Richard in the master bath filling soaking
22–17	"The Charlestown House - 17"	January 13, 2001
The Charlestown project enters the homestretch, and there is evidence throughout the house that the end is in sight. The flooring for the basement hallway, made of bamboo, is installed. On the first and second floors, the marble kitchen countertops go in, bringing the kitchens one step to completion. And finally, host Steve Thomas tours a small foundry in San Francisco where historically accurate brass doorknobs for the front entryway were crafted.
22–18	"The Charlestown House - 18"	January 20, 2001
The final days in Charlestown. The This Old House team works its way through the checklist of finishes. Period lighting fixtures, wallpaper, carpeting, and two new suites of modern appliances turn the Beliveaus' townhouse into an up-to-the-minute histioric showpiece.
The West Palm Beach House
22–19	"West Palm Beach - 01"	January 27, 2001
Destination: West Palm Beach! With the allure of coastal breezes, warm Florida sand, political intrigue, and 16 historical districts, how could we refuse? A community with a revitalized downtown and considerable residential renovation, West Palm Beach, Florida, serves as the backdrop to the This Old House project house, a small Mediterranean Revival bungalow. Built in the 1920s, new homeowner Rob Thompson envisions turning it, and the two-story garage/apartment behind it, into a compound for living and working.
22–20	"West Palm Beach - 02"	February 3, 2001
Work begins in earnest on Rob Thompson's 1925 Mediterranean Revival-style home in West Palm Beach, Florida. General contractors Harley Edgell and John Kern begin to assess how much termite and water damage is lurking behind the stucco, while architect Roger Janssen explains his vision, via a model, of the proposed redesign. Host Steve Thomas tours Flamingo Park, the historic neighborhood where Rob's house is located.
22–21	"West Palm Beach - 03"	February 10, 2001
As hurricanes are a serious threat to houses in Southern Florida, precautions are taken to help the buildings survive the storms. Hurricane resistant replacement windows arrive at the West Palm Beach project house, the shatterproof glass does away with need for clumsy storm shutters. Our team visits one of the century's most ambitious and complex construction project-NASA's International Space Station at Florida's Kennedy Space Center. Steve receives an exclusive tour of the Space Station's components while Norm learns about the specific job performed by various space tools. Finally, they visit the Space Shuttle Atlantis, which will haul this equipment 240 miles into space.
22–22	"West Palm Beach - 04"	February 17, 2001
Host Steve Thomas checks in with homeowner Rob Thompson as renovation work continues on the West Palm Beach project house. While the new lap pool is installed behind the house, progress continues with the kitchen expansion. Norm finds the transformation of the former garage into a workshop for Rob well underway.
22–23	"West Palm Beach - 05"	February 24, 2001
The transformation process continues at the West Palm Beach project house, and now it's decision time. General contractors Harley Edgell and John Kern press homeowner Rob Thompson about his decisions for cabinets, appliances, tile, countertops, and bath fixtures so that the materials can be ordered and arrive without breaking the workflow, which could cause delays.
22–24	"West Palm Beach - 06"	March 3, 2001
Host Steve Thomas learns more about West Palm Beach's story from former mayor Nancy Graham as they tour City Place, a new shopping and residential block. The new development has been credited with inspiring West Palm Beach's renaissance. Back at the project, Steve Thomas watches the new cabinetry being installed as the kitchen renovation nears completion. Our master carpenter checks in with general contractors Harley Edgell and John Kern who are busy converted the garage into a workshop. Finally, the landscaping begins at earnest with the installation of the new patio featuring a new type of paver.
22–25	"West Palm Beach - 07"	March 10, 2001
With just a few weeks left to go until the project house in West Palm Beach is completed, our team surveys the progress. Steve oversees the installation of granite countertops in the new kitchen, while our master carpenter checks on the pergola that will separate the driveway from the pool. Later, Steve meets with landscape architect Jeff Blakely to discuss the new state-of-the-art, substance drip irrigation system and checks out the landscape's new plantings.
22–26	"West Palm Beach - 08"	March 17, 2001
This Old House wraps up its 22nd season. Our team checks on the remaining details including the finished landscape, the new, professional grade kitchen appliances, and the interior design work being done by none other than homeowner, Rob Thompson, as This Old House wraps up its 22nd season.

== Season 23 (2001–02) ==
- Steve Thomas's thirteenth season as the host.
- This Old House Ventures bought the series from WGBH.
- This is the last season to have Fats Waller's "Louisiana Fairy Tale" as the original This Old House theme song. It had been in use since This Old House debuted in 1979.

No. in season	Title	Original release date
The Manchester House
23–01	"The Manchester House - 1"	September 22, 2001
This Old House kicks off its 23rd season, where Steve and Norm approach the latest project house by water, finding a convenient dock at the base of the property. They meet Janet McCue, who is busy supervising the family's move out of the house for the duration of the project, and her husband David, who gives them a tour around the inside of the rambling building. Steve meets architect Stephen Holt, who shows a picture of the house looked 100 years ago. For inspiration, they visit a classic Shingle-style home, built in 1881 and lovingly maintained ever since. Back at the subject house, Richard Trethewey and Tom Silva pull up in their own boat to begin a mechanical exam of the house with our master carpenter. Their verdict: a solid, well-plumbed structure to build on. The McCues describe their hopes for the project: better communication between house and yard, a relocated and improved kitchen, expanded master bath and bedroom, and a great room for music performances and relaxing.
23–02	"The Manchester House - 2"	September 29, 2001
The day starts off with the landscaping works of Roger Cook. He and his crew cut down a few trees that were threatening the house, have moved a dozen or so rhododendrons and azaleas that are in the way of the new addition, and are preparing to move a 25-foot evergreen and a 20-foot dogwood by balling the roots and using a large excavator. Inside, architect Stephen Holt shows a model of the proposed renovation to homeowner David McCue and Steve. Essentially, he hopes to restore the building to its former architectural beauty on the outside, while overcoming some floorplan problems to make it work better for the McCues inside. Part of the interior rearrangement includes putting the kitchen front and center in the house, something that wouldn't have been found in the original Shingle style building. To prove it can be done, Holt takes David and Steve to a nearby house, of a similar vintage, where he accomplished just such a change for the client. Back at the house, our master carpenter and Tom work to gently dismantle and save one of the few original fragments left in the building: a marble and copper butler's sink.
23–03	"The Manchester House - 3"	October 6, 2001
Steve sees the seaside public rotunda and "chowder house" our subject property looks out on, with Manchester Historical Society president John Huss as guide. At the house, nearly four dumpsters worth of gutting has occurred, and Steve, our master carpenter and Tom take a tour of the building to see what has been revealed of its renovation history and discuss what is planned for this job. Architect Stephen Holt and homeowner David McCue continue to discuss options available to give the McCues the feeling of space and light they crave for the kitchen and living room - some are radical and expensive, some rely more on minor but clever changes. One thing they can't include is a change in footprint: the concrete has arrived for the footings for the new addition and porch. In the basement, the start of an oil leak in one of the old steel tanks has forced Richard Trethewey's hand, and he's brought in two new polyethylene-lined tanks from Europe, guaranteed never to rot. Finally, Steve learns from Manchester Conservation Commissioner Betsy Rickards the purpose of and regulations concerning the staked and lined haybales encircling the project.
23–04	"The Manchester House - 4"	October 13, 2001
With the new concrete walls poured, it's time to damp-proof them, just one more in a series of tasks that adds up to nearly $30,000 for the new foundation - which is simply the cost of building to code. Reviewing the immense amount of demolition done, and the work left to do, Steve asks the obvious: wouldn't it be cheaper, faster, and better to simply bulldose this tired old building and build a fresh replica? Master carpenter Norm Abram and Tom have done the math, and while it might be simpler, it would cost about $1 million more than the planned renovation. Besides, adds Tom, we are saving the old place, which is worth something. After taking a tour of one of the great surviving Shingle style buildings, H. H. Richardson's Stonehurst in Waltham, Massachusetts, Steve comes back more convinced than ever that saving what little is left of the McCues' house is the right thing to do.
23–05	"The Manchester House - 5"	October 20, 2001
The foundation has been backfilled and carpenters are busy putting up the forms for the new terrace. Inside, the area for the new kitchen and family room has been completely opened up, thanks to a 3800-pound steel and laminated lumber beam Tommy and his crew engineered and inserted through the side of the building. Within the new space, kitchen cabinet designer and builder Ted Goodnow works with David and Janet McCue to begin to lay out the new kitchen, pantry and office. Ted takes David and Steve to a nearby kitchen built his firm to get some more ideas about design features and materials. Back at the house, Tommy and our master carpenter investigate some archeology revealed during demolition: original fabric of the building, including the roof, a dormer and a gabled sidewall. The original wood roof shingles are an important factor as our master carpenter begins to consider roofing choices with roofing contractor Mark Mulloy and product rep Steve Miller, who shows them a treated shingle of southern yellow pine that carries a 50-year transferable warranty.
23–06	"The Manchester House - 6"	October 27, 2001
Steve finds master carpenter Norm Abram in the new jobsite office trailer, complete with secure storage - good for keeping paperwork safe from the work going on inside the house and for keeping track of delivered materials. Tom shows Steve the progress on the job, including the restored dormers, straightened floors and an ingenious method of raising the kitchen/family room ceiling by shaving 2" off the joists and stiffening the remaining structure with engineered lumber and steel to form flitches. Window specialist Jay Harman shows our master carpenter three different windows to consider for the renovation: pine, aluminum clad, and Alaskan yellow cedar. Each has its own qualities (and price point), but for maintenance by the water, the choice may very well be the clad. Finally, kitchen cabinet designer and manufacturer Ted Goodnow and homeowner Janet McCue show Steve a full-size mock-up of the kitchen they're considering.
23–07	"The Manchester House - 7"	November 3, 2001
Steve tries his hand at driving the jobsite forklift, successfully (if shakily) delivering a load of plywood to the third floor. Inside, he and Tom discuss their concerns about the planned kitchen, office and gameroom, and Tom shows Steve an alternate location for the latter: the now-spectacular dormered third floor. In preparation for residing our old house, our master carpenter learns the finer points of red cedar shingles and bleaching oils from specialist Rick Farrar. Steve takes a harbor tour with architect Steve Holt to see what has happened to some of the town's great old houses - everything from total restoration to total removal. One of the notorious removals was that of Kragsyde, considered by some to be the greatest example of the Shingle style - it was demolished in 1929. Though it's gone, an exact replica has been built by a couple in Swan's Island, Maine, and Steve visits them to see their remarkable achievement.
23–08	"The Manchester House - 8"	November 10, 2001
Our new roof is going on, and our master carpenter talks to roofing contractor Mark Mulloy about the system: decking, bitumen membrane covering every surface from eave to ridge, a three-dimensional nylon mesh to allow air to flow beneath the shingles, and finally the shingles themselves - pressure-treated southern yellow pine with a 50-year transferable warranty. Tom shows Steve how to cut studs quickly when building a partition wall beneath a bowed ceiling, while our master carpenter takes viewers to the Bend, Oregon, factory where our new windows are being made. Finally, specialist Mark Schaub assesses the state of the chimneys; surprisingly the relatively new one, built in the 1970s, is not up to snuff.
23–09	"The Manchester House - 9"	November 17, 2001
Steve sees the progress on the new addition, including a roof joist system of 1 x 12 LVLs, necessitated by the room's high ceiling height. Inside, Tom and master carpenter Norm Abram show him how they are stiffening up a bouncy third floor by sistering 1/8" steel sheets to the floor joists from below. Richard Trethewey checks out a software program that computes heat loss for our building, as well as projecting heating and cooling costs with various insulation, window, and power plant configurations. One remarkable finding: with the current, inefficient heating plant and standard insulation and double-pane windows operating costs for 30 years would be around $220,000; with expanded-foam insulation, low-e windows, and super-high-efficiency heating equipment the cost would be $75,000. Our master carpenter takes viewers to Portland, Oregon, where a couple has turned passion for period-perfect Victorian restorations into a fledgling business. Finally, the first of the new sliding glass doors goes in.
23–10	"The Manchester House - 10"	November 24, 2001
Steve begins the show in a municipal parking lot in Ipswich, Massachusetts, where once stood a beautiful 250-year-old Georgian home. Later in the show, he takes viewers to the Smithsonian's National Museum of American History, where the house - and the lives of the many families that live there - have been reconstructed. At the jobsite, mason Lenny Belliveau builds the new addition's exterior face from water-stuck brick, while inside, master carpenter Norm Abram checks out Dan McLaughin's use of an insulating chimney system made from pumice. It goes up quickly and keeps the chimney stack warmer, preventing the buildup of the column of cold air that normally dumps out, spreading smoke into the room. Tommy shows Steve his method of putting in a wooden floor over concrete that was previously outdoor patio space; his scribing technique is one Steve's never seen before. Finally, architect Steve Holt shows our master carpenter his design for the new fireplace inglenook, based in part of old photos taken before the original addition was torn down.
23–11	"The Manchester House - 11"	December 1, 2001
From the shoreline, Steve sees the rapidly improving look of the house, which has now regained its missing wing and dormers, and is starting to have its new front porches put on. Tom and master carpenter Norm Abram take a progress tour, whose highlights include the new wood roof, tricky roof detailing on the new addition, and a look at the newly dormered third floor. Landscape contractor Roger Cook, landscape architect David Hawk, and homeowner Janet McCue discuss plans for the new landscape, with special consideration given to the idea of changing the size and location of the current driveway. The kitchen design has been finalized, and designer Kevin Finnegan take Steve through a full-size mock-up.
23–12	"The Manchester House - 12"	December 8, 2001
There's been major progress on the job, as Steve sees the new bays and porch deck on the sea side of the house, Tommy and our master carpenter begin shingling with red cedar shingles predipped in bleaching oil. Steve and landscape contractor Roger Cook meet with Manchester conservation officer Betsy Rickards to learn what the regulations say about thinning a dense copse of trees down by the water. As we begin to think about our house's interior finishes, Steve takes viewers on a visit to a home that is all about interiors: Beauport, a 40-room fantasy that was the passion of interior designer Henry Davis Sleeper, who worked on it from 1907 to his death in 1934, fitting each room out in a different theme. Back on site, our master carpenter checks in with roofer Mark Mulloy, who is fashioning a lead-coated copper roof for the bell-shaped bump-out on the music room. Finally, Steve gets a glimpse of plumbing's future as Brian Bilo shows him the simple and quick installation of plastic water piping.
23–13	"The Manchester House - 13"	December 15, 2001
Roger Cook and crew have begun to tear up the old asphalt driveway in preparation for a newly configured one. Painter John Dee shows Steve his approach to restoring the turn-of-the-century portico: some stripping of existing features, and some replacement of those decorative elements - brackets and capitals - that are simply not salvageable. Homeowner David McCue tells Steve about his desire to install an outdoor hot tub, for his two boys to enjoy alone or, importantly, with him, and Steve takes him to see the one Steve installed in his own backyard for the exact same reasons. Back at the site, Tom and master carpenter Norm Abram use - and approve of - polyurethane exterior trim, while Steve joins acoustical consultant John Storyk as he works with David to tackle some of the sound issues in the new music room. Master carpenter Norm Abram and Tom discuss the state of the original diamond-paned bumpout, its usefulness as a place for plants, and the possibility of replacing it with a proper greenhouse. To research the concept, architect Steve Holt shows Steve around a nearby guest house he designed, complete with a very high-end conservatory.
23–14	"The Manchester House - 14"	December 22, 2001
Master carpenter Norm Abram sees how the faulty east chimney has been fixed by specialist Mark Schaub and his crew: the game room fireplace is bricked over, but the guest room above gets a new hearth, firebox and gas "coal grate." Richard Trethewey shows Steve how he's using a beat-up airhandler to provide dry, clean temporary jobside heat and gives an overview on how he plans to heat and cool the house - radiant floor heat on the first floor, flat-panel radiators for the second and third, and a/c only in select rooms on the second and third. Steve finds Roger Cook out back, where he's been denied Conservation Commission approval to cut down trees near the ocean, though he is allow to limb them up for a better view. Out at the auto court, Roger shows Steve how he cuts 2" thick granite in a curve. Steve and homeowner Janet McCue visit a garden shop to see how various paving options look before she commits to buying materials for the landscape. Back at the house, architect Steve Holt describes a mid-job design change - a decision not to give the second-floor bays walkout decks - and Tom and master carpenter Norm Abram carefully pull up a hard-pine floor for use elsewhere in the building.
23–15	"The Manchester House - 15"	December 29, 2001
The last of the ipe decking is arrived, Steve and master carpenter Norm Abram check out the installation method on the front deck: pressure-treated sleepers spiked into the concrete slab, with the ipe held down with marine adhesive and a few stainless steel finish nails. The wood itself is so dense that it takes oil with difficulty - it's fine to leave it unfinished. Master carpenter Norm Abram finds out how homeowner Janet McCue has fare in her attempt to strip the diamond-paned curved sash on the historic bump-out. It was an arduous process - an alternative would be to send them out for stripping, but that would necessitate reglazing and repainting the entire sash, even though only the exterior needs it. Steve sees the expanded foam insulation going in and talks to the company president about its relatively high cost (2 to 3 times of that fiberglass), its performance, and its environmental record (which is excellent). Richard Trethewey shows our master carpenter aluminum-clad PEX tubing used for plumbing the radiators, as well as some quick-connect fittings for attaching it to the copper lines in the basement. Steve learns the finer points of finish plastering from Jeff Sullivan. Finally, Janet and Steve visit a Boston tile showcase to work on the final selections for the house.
23–16	"The Manchester House - 16"	January 5, 2002
The last of the wallbaord has arrived, including 1/4" bendable board for the music room's curved ceiling. Lighting designer Susan Arnold shows Steve the many choices in recessed downlights, including the ones picked for the kitchen, which electrician Peter Woodbury is installing. In the basement, Richard Trethewey explains the plumbing setup to homeowner David McCue, who is eager to understand which part does what and what he should and should not do when interacting with his house's heating plant. Painter John Dee shows Steve the progress on the portico restoration project; his latest achievement is making a mold to cast missing pieces of the decorative plaster. Roger Cook shows Steve the three patios he and his crew have built, then takes Steve to a nearby nursery where he and landscape architect David Hawk lay out, at full scale, David's proposed planting plan for the turning island in the new driveway. Back at the site, Tommy and our master carpenter put up a new porch column made from expanded polyurethane and given bearing strength by a core of steel tube.
23–17	"The Manchester House - 17"	January 12, 2002
Steve drove down to the house, checking out the newly open vistas of the house and yard through the newly bare trees along the road. Inside, the study and dining room are shaping up, with blueboard on the walls and the old fireplace rehabilitated. In the music room, the dramatic coved ceiling is getting the first part of its acoustical plaster system: fiberglass panels coated with plaster like coating that's invisible to sound, allowing the panels to absorb unwanted echoes while maintaining a traditional look. Acoustician Peter D'Antonio explains the new aluminum half-round gutters manufacturer Augustin Crookston and his crew are hanging from the roof shingles. Steve sees John Dee's slow but steady progress on the portico restoration; today, he's installing new plaster brackets to replace the originals, which were too deteriorated to salvage. Steve takes viewers to the Chicago factory where they were made, the same way they have been for 100 years. Finally, Roger Cook shows off the new back patio, made up of massive pieces of Goshen stone.
23–18	"The Manchester House - 18"	January 19, 2002
The new spa arrives on the back of the truck; placed on concrete pad, plugged in and filled with a hose, it's soon open for business. Tom begins installing the new beautiful wood portico columns, using an ingenious jig to fashion two of them into engaged columns up against the house. Master carpenter Norm Abram visits Alcott House in Concord, Massachusetts. Home of Little Women author Louisa May Alcott and her transcendentalist father Bronson, it is a mecca for thousands of visitors, and preserving it intact is a high-priority but tricky job. Back at the house, master carpenter Norm Abram help finish carpenter (and former TOH homeowner) Dick Silva trim out one of the windows in period detail.
23–19	"The Manchester House - 19"	January 26, 2002
Roger Cook and crew enclose the new spa in veneer stone, while inside homeowner Janet McCue has roped two friends into helping her complete the stripping and reglazing of the half-round bump-out windows, no small job. The music room receives its final, finish coat of acoustical plaster, and our master carpenter checks out a new four-oscillating-head sander that flooring contractor Pat Hunt is using. Richard visits Kohler, Wisconsin, to see how one company has used computer-aided engineering to design a toilet "engine" that meets the challenge of using only 1.6 gallons per flush. Back at the house, Tom shows Steve a flexible molding that bends around the radius of the kitchen bay and matches perfectly with the wooden moldings on the straight runs. Finally, master carpenter Norm Abram takes measurements for the music room inglenook, making a set of layout sticks he can use in the workshop to accurately reflect conditions in the field.
23–20	"The Manchester House - 20"	February 2, 2002
An asphalt grinder makes quick work of the old driveway, turning blacktop into a gravel mix that will serve as a bed for the new, reconfigured drive. Inside, Mark Schaub shows Steve the new sealed gas fireplace in the guest bedroom; a last-minute discovery of a Massachusetts-only code prevented the use of the open unit we had hope to use. Nonetheless, the new solution is a handsome unit, remote-controlled, with a period English tile surround and hearth and with a mantle made from pieces of the old master bathroom fireplace, which was taken out. Landscape architect David Hawk walks Steve along the rapidly developing new driveway, which gives an entirely different arrival experience than the old 16-foot-wide straight approach it replaces. Richard Trethewey shows off a new energy-recovery ventilator that not only changes the house's air (essential, given how highly insulated we've made it) but harvests heat and moisture from the exiting stale air in the winter, adding both to the incoming fresh air, doing the same with coolness and dryness in the summer. Homeowner David McCue visits master carpenter Norm Abram in the New Yankee Workshop to help in the making of the inglenook, priming the raised panels. Back at the house, Tom puts up beadboard made from sheets of medium-density fiberboard, showing Steve a trick involving a baseboard rabbet.
23–21	"The Manchester House - 21"	February 9, 2002
Roger Cook mulches the planting areas around the finished spa; bushes will give it some privacy. In the dining room, Tommy puts up the final pieces of an elaborate, 11-piece ceiling molding that replicates the house's original detail, while master carpenter Norm Abram meets cabinetmaker Tom Perkins, who is using a software program to specify the exact components of the many built-ins. He will e-mail a numerical code to a shop in the Midwest, which will efficiently cut all the pieces and ship them to him to assemble and install. Steve gets a lesson in paint preparation from paint contractor Jim Clark, who reveals the many steps necessary to obtain the smooth finish that is he and his crew's trademark. Richard Trethewey shows Steve the latest generation in radiant-floor-heat technology: accordion-like panels that quickly unfold to cover 10 square feet and accept radiant tubing. Finally, Joe Ferrante shows off his tiling work in the master bath, whose steam shower is done up in limestone and marble.
23–22	"The Manchester House - 22"	February 16, 2002
In the music room, master carpenter Norm Abram begins to install the first pieces of inglenook, while Steve gets a look at the wiring, fuse panels, and emergency backup power unit for the house with electrician Pete Woodbury. Steve continues his painting training with contractor Jim Clark, this time spending a few hours preparing the master bedroom bay windows for final coats. Outside, Roger Cook and arborist Matt Foti decide the fates of an unhealthy ash tree and a split-fork oak is overhanging the east end of the house. Tom shows Steve the system he's using to make mahogany panelling in the music room; one of its key components is a fastening technology that uses plastic "bow ties" to hold wood to wood. Master carpenter Norm Abram and Tom get a lesson in its use from a factory rep.
23–23	"The Manchester House - 23"	February 23, 2002
Mud season has arrived early in Manchester, and Steve pulls our producer out of the mud to start the show. In the mudroom, Joe Ferrante lays 6 x 6 Chinese slate, while our master carpenter checks out the newly arrived kitchen cabinets. Their light mahogany will contrast with the painted "furniture-look" of the islands. Other cabinetry for the house was measured up for on site, cut in a factory in the Midwest, and sent as parts back to cabinetmaker Tom Perkins' Massachusetts shop. Master carpenter Norm Abram visits him there to see how the job's progressing. Back at the house, painting contractor Jim Clark gives Steve a lesson in painting complex trim using an HVLP (high-volume, low-pressure) sprayer, and lighting designer Susan Arold shows him how she plans to meet the challenges posed by the music room. Master carpenter Norm Abram and Tom check out the new quartersawn oak floating floor contractor Pat Hunt and crew are installing - this is a good product that has only gotten better over the years. Finally, homeowner David McCue and Tom install a bumper system David's company manufacturers that will ensure that the garage walls will no longer take bites out of the McCues' car doors.
23–24	"The Manchester House - 24"	March 2, 2002
As our completion deadline draws near, the house is abuzz with activity. Flooring contractor Pat Hunt installs a lazer-cut wood floor medallion in the shape of a compass rose, while master carpenter Norm Abram continues to assemble the various pieces of the inglenook on site. Today's elements include curved flanking benches perched on turned legs, while Steve got to try his hand at the New Yankee Workshop. Master carpenter Norm Abram also shows Steve a trick carpenter Dick Silva discovered to handle the curved trimwork around the inglenook: he passed flexible expanded polyurethane planks, the same as we used on the exterior trim, though a molding machine to give it the right profile, and bent it into place. Plumbers Richard Trethewey and Richard Bilo show Steve that getting the old oval sink running again is no simple task. The kitchen is nearly complete, and project manager Doug Kutz gives Steve a tour as the last large piece of honed green granite gets put into place. The glass conservatory roof has arrived and is assembled in place on top of the old half-round bumpout, bringing abundant light into the east end of the kitchen/living room. Finally, Tom shows master carpenter Norm Abram how he's making curved crown molding the old-fashioned way - pulling the profile in plaster.
23–25	"The Manchester House - 25"	March 9, 2002
A last arrival by boat reveals to Steve and master carpenter Norm Abram how far we have come from the plain shingled box we found on Day 1 of this project, and Steve declares he will be satisfied if, as other boaters float into Manchester harbor over the years, they'll look at the McCues' home and say what a nice old building it is (even though most of what they will see is new). Inside, painter Jim Clark shows master carpenter Norm Abram how he is using tung oil to give the music room's mahogany paneling its final, rich look. David McCue gives his new kitchen a test drive with the help of demonstration cook and appliance expert Jane Scammon; together they make Steve lunch and show off the kitchen's many cutting-edge appliances. Master carpenter Norm Abram helps Tom install an interior mortise set, in tarnish proof brass, into one of the house's many new MDF doors, while Steve checks out part of the new audio system with designer/installer Bob Domus. Richard Trethewey gives Steve a tour of the new master bath, carpet expert Jerry Arcari shows how the front stair runner is going in, and acoustician John Storyk and David McCue hear how John's design for the music room's acoustics panned out.
23–26	"The Manchester House - 26"	March 16, 2002
The 23rd season of This Old House wraps up with a look at the smoke detectors - specialist Greg Smizer explains to Steve maintenance obsolescence issues, and points out that the ones he's installing also detect high and low temperatures. In the master bedroom, Richard Trethewey sees how the frameless glass shower door is going in, while master carpenter Norm Abram and Tom go over the few items remaining on the punchlist, and Steve looks at the new master closet system as it goes on. Outside, Steve recalls the rather forlorn building we began this project with and takes a final look at the restored facades. Inside, homeowner Janet McCue and her interior designer, Leslie Tuttle, take Steve on a tour of the house, ending in the magnificent music room, where the wrap party is underway, as This Old House wraps up its 23rd season. Note: This is the last episode of This Old House where Fats Waller's "Louisiana Fairy Tale" is the theme song. It had been in use since the first episode in 1979. Due to music rights issues, This Old House wanted to remove Fats Waller's "Louisiana Fairy Tale", replacing it with "This Old House '97", composed by Peter Bell.

== Season 24 (2002–03) ==
- This is the last season with Steve Thomas as the host, who had been with the series since joining This Old House in 1989.
- Ask This Old House debuted on PBS in primetime.
- Due to music rights issues, This Old House no longer used Fats Waller's "Louisiana Fairy Tale" as the show's original theme song. This Old House introduced a new theme song; "This Old House '97", composed by Peter Bell.

No. in season	Title	Original release date
The Winchester House
24–01	"The Winchester House - 1"	October 10, 2002
The 24th season of This Old House kicks off with a homeward commute from the 1920s, returning by train to Winchester, Massachusetts, a town that retains much of its original early 1900s character. Waiting for him at the station is master carpenter Norm Abram in a classic Ford Model A "Woody." A short drive through town brings them to a 1922 Colonial Revival home in a charming neighborhood known as the "Flats." Steve steps out back door to find new homeowner (and master gardener) Kim Whittemore pruning perennials. Their tour of the first floor reveals a tired but well-maintained house in need of updating. Meanwhile, general contractor Tom Silva, Norm and plumbing and heating expert Richard Trethewey search for trouble spots. Convinced that the home has "good bones" and needs primarily only surface work, Steve and Norm seal the deal with new homeowners Kim Whittemore and Bruce Leasure welcoming them to the This Old House family. Note: This is the first episode where "This Old House '97" by Peter Bell is the theme.
24–02	"The Winchester House - 2"	October 17, 2002
Host Steve Thomas checks in with general contractor Tom Silva and painting contractor Jim Clark, who are busy testing means by which to strip nearly 30 layers of lead-based paint from the exterior of the house. In the backyard, landscape contractor Roger Cook shows homeowner Kim Whittemore how to properly ball and burlap several trees and shrubs, moving them to safety before construction begins. Looking to enlist the help of a good architect, Steve meets project architect David Stirling, whose firm has worked on some 120 houses in Winchester; they tour a beautiful home he designed from the ground up. Later, back at the project house, they meet up with homeowner Bruce Leasure to sketch out some solutions for the master suite.
24–03	"The Winchester House - 3"	October 24, 2002
Master carpenter Norm Abram arrives on site to find the demo crew suspended over the roof dismantling the top of the unused kitchen chimney. Architect David Stirling and homeowner Kim Whittemore look at the latest plans for expanding the kitchen and improving flow on the first floor. Meanwhile, landscape contractor Roger Cook meets with entomologist Bob Childs to explore ways to save the property's signature hemlocks from a potentially fatal infestation of woolly adelgids, which have been attacking forests up and down the East Coast.
24–04	"The Winchester House - 4"	October 31, 2002
Host Steve Thomas lends carpenter Charlie Silva a hand in slowly jacking up the second floor, then general contractor Tom Silva glues and bolts reinforcing LVLs to the damaged floor joists. Plumbing and heating expert Richard Trethewey arrives to drain the heating system and disconnect the old radiators. In the kitchen, homeowner Kim Whittemore and a friend take down the chimney brick by brick. The next day, some unwanted trees are cut "up" rather than cut down, as they are chain-sawed apart and lifted piece by piece out of the backyard with the help of a large crane.
24–05	"The Winchester House - 5"	November 7, 2002
It's time to begin excavation on the new kitchen foundation. Excavator Jeff Dervin brings in a backhoe to knock down the back entry porch. In the basement, master carpenter Norm Abram and general contractor Tom Silva jackhammer through the floor to install footings for a new steel support column. Architect David Stirling presents homeowners Bruce Leasure and Kim Whittemore with a new layout for the master suite, and landscape contractor Roger Cook invites host Steve Thomas and Kim to see a nearby vintage greenhouse for inspiration.
24–06	"The Winchester House - 6"	November 14, 2002
Contractor Mark Dimeo uses a 30" diamond blade to cut a new doorway into the existing basement foundation. Host Steve Thomas checks in with painting contractor Jim Clark to see how a new non-toxic chemical paint stripper is working on the multiple layers of exterior paint. Architect David Stirling and homeowner Kime Whittemore discuss strategies to deal with the house's asymmetric roof dormers. Then, Steve and Kim go shopping for the new addition's windows.
24–07	"The Winchester House - 7"	November 21, 2002
Master carpenter Norm Abram shows host Steve Thomas the new foundation for the kitchen addition and explains how to properly anchor it to the old foundation. General contractor Tom Silva and his crew begin demolition on the rotted sections of the sun porch, and Norm explains why they should salvage the roof to save both time and money. Down the street, Steve and homeowner Kim Whittemore visit a recently renovated sun porch, kitchen and media room for design ideas. In the master suite, plumbing and heating expert Richard Trethewey lays out a plan for the rough plumbing.
24–08	"The Winchester House - 8"	November 28, 2002
Chimney specialist Mark Schaub meets up with host Steve Thomas in the Winchester living room and shows him why the chimney is smoking, with the help of a diagnostic "fluecam." In the kitchen, general contractor Tom Silva shows master carpenter Norm Abram and Steve how he reinforced the framing of the kitchen addition with engineered lumber and steel. Recalling the issue of the cantilevered second floor, Steve takes a look at a major renovation of perhaps the most famous cantilever in the country, that of Frank Lloyd Wright's Fallingwater. Back at the project house, Steve lends Tom and Norm a hand on the deck structure for the new sun porch.
24–09	"The Winchester House - 9"	December 5, 2002
Host Steve Thomas finds homeowner Kim Whittemore experimenting with Colonial Revival paint colors on the front of the Winchester house. For further ideas, they travel with building conservation specialist Andrea Gilmore to see a classic Colonial Revival that is a high expression of the style. Plumbing and heating expert Richard Trethewey plans a radiant heat solution for keeping the exterior concrete basement stairs ice-free. In a side story, Steve visits a local museum dedicated to Winchester resident and photographer Arthur Griffin, noted for his legendary work with baseball's Ted Williams, and master carpenter Norm Abram takes homeowner Bruce Leasure through a variety of roofing options to replace the house's tired asphalt shingles.
24–10	"The Winchester House - 10"	December 12, 2002
Host Steve Thomas arrives at the Winchester house to find a surprise in the backyard: the house to the rear is fully exposed now that the neighbors have cut down additional hemlocks. A few miles away, master carpenter Norm Abram takes a look at a real estate development success story - a 1950's ranch has been torn down and replaced by a brand new Colonial Revival handcrafted to feel like an old home. In the Winchester basement, general contractor Tom Silva shows Norm and Steve the adjustments made to help reroute traffic around the future media room instead of through it, and chimney specialist Mark Sucaub uses a centrifugal hammer to break up the ailing chimney's old flue.
24–11	"The Winchester House - 11"	December 19, 2002
The Winchester kitchen addition is nearly complete, and general contractor Tom Silva installs the last of the new historically accurate double-hung windows on the sun porch. In the kitchen, mineral wool - an old-style insulation known for its fire resistance and sound deadening capabilities, now revamped for the residential market - is sprayed into the walls. Custom cabinetmaker Jeff Peavy lays out the design and material choices for the kitchen, and roofing contractor Tom Evarts shows master carpenter Norm Abram his crew's project: architectural asphalt for the main roof, and flat-seam lead-coated copper for the addition. Plumbing and heating expert Richard Trethewey shows host Steve Thomas the new plastic water supply lines, and the heating and cooling system, supplied by flexible 4" ducts.
24–12	"The Winchester House - 12"	December 26, 2002
Using a 70" tree spade mounted on a front-end loader, landscape contractor Roger Cook and arborist Matt Foti remove a healthy (but poorly located) blue spruce from a front yard in a nearby town and replant it in Winchester to begin the process of screening the backyard. To help with decision-making in the media room, host Steve Thomas and homeowner Burce Leasure visit a house that has both a high-end theater in the basement and a more modest media room on the first floor. Back at the project house, plumbing and heating expert Richard Trethewey shows Steve three polyethylene tanks that will store 1,125 gallons of harvested rainwater for reuse in the garden. Master carpenter Norm Abram takes a trip to Vermont to visit coppersmith Larry Stearns who is busy building a "This Old House" weathervane.
24–13	"The Winchester House - 13"	January 2, 2003
With the weather turning cooler, Steve finds painting contractor Jim Clark under pressure to finish the exterior painting. On the third floor, Norm learns that Tom is off the job having emergency knee surgery due to a recent injury. With Tom out of commission, foreman John Sheridan gives Norm an update on what's left to do. Steve joins interior designer Manuel de Santaren to see how his firm designed the living room of a similar Colonial Revival. Manuel's partner, Carolina Tress-Balsbaugh, meets Steve and homeowner Kim Whittemore at the project house to present their design ideas for our living room. Flooring contractor Patrick Hunt discovers three different species of wood flooring used throughout the house - heart pine, beech, and oak - and shows Norm how to use a router to nearly patch holes left by the old radiators. In the backyard, Steve finds that Roger has planted a small forest of spruce and white pine to provide shade and privacy.
24–14	"The Winchester House - 14"	January 9, 2003
Steve arrives to find Roger out front hauling away the last of the dismantled driveway. Inside, Steve finds a recovering Tom Silva, fresh from surgery and walking with a cane, but back on the job. Tom shows Steve an extruded polystyrene crown molding that is affixed only with joint compound, not nails. In the kitchen, soapstone installer Glenn Bowman shows Norm how his crew customizes soapstone counters on site. In a side trip to the Vermont woods, Glenn shows Steve how he is prospecting for deposits of soapstone in a long-abandoned quarry. In the garage, Stev finds Dave Hahn installing sectional overhead garage doors designed to look like original 1920's swingout doors.
24–15	"The Winchester House - 15"	January 16, 2003
Steve visits Middlesex Fells Reservation - a 3-mile by 3-mile park shared by five suburban towns North of Boston - and climbs Wright's Tower to take in the cityscape and some vibrant autumnal views. Back in Winchester, Steve helps Roger Cook and concrete contractor Syd March pour and trowel the new front walk. Custom cabinetmaker Jeff Peavey shows Steve the unique features of the newly installed kitchen cabinets. Outside, Tom shows Steve how to properly measure for storm windows. In a side story, Norm finds a custom storm window company in Connecticut that will plant aluminum storms to match any color trim. Under pressure to get the heat on down in the basement, Richard shows Steve what's new with radiant heat, and how he plans to heat three different types of floors with three distinct radiant zones. Tom and Norm carry out the architect's plan for elaborate pyramidal mahogany stairs off the sun porch.
24–16	"The Winchester House - 16"	January 23, 2003
With Steve away on assignment, Norm arrives to find Roger unloading and inspecting the last delivery from the garden center. On the sun porch floor, tiling contractor Joe Ferrante shows Norm how to apply grout around the new 12-inch by 12-inch Chinese slate tiles. Meanwhile, Steve and interior designer Carolina Tress-Balsbaugh visit a boutique in Boston that has been manufacturing custom lampshades for 150 years. Things heat up in the master bath as Richard tries out the new steam shower, then shows Norm how it works. Painting contractor Jim Clark demonstrates tips and techniques for prepping and painting the interior of the house, and flooring contractor Pat Hunt installs a new floating oak floor in the master suite. In the backyard, Roger shows Kim how creative landscaping can conceal the external air conditioning condensers.
24–17	"The Winchester House - 17"	January 30, 2003
In the second-to-last show, Steve and homeowner Kim Whittemore test-drive the new stainless steel appliances. Norm meets fencing contractor Mark Bushway to admire the entire custom package: a driveway gate (make to look like the 1920s original) perimeter fence, arbor and pergola, and a new plastic fence post system designed to prevent insect damage and rot. Steve visits a nearby upholstery shop to see several of Kim's chairs, just shipped in from Alabama, being stripped, repaired, and reupholstered. Closet system designer Marcy Weisburgh shows Steve how she designed the master closet to accommodate both a window and a steam generator for the adjacent bathroom. Electrician Allen Gallant installs a five-arm Colonial Revival chandelier made by a mail order company that builds to order and delivers directly to the job site. Tom and carpenter Jason Wood line the walls with cost-effective built-in bookshelves, made from MDF and popular laminate.
24–18	"The Winchester House - 18"	February 6, 2003
In the final show, Steve checks out the new garage storage system, including diamond-plated cabinets, toolboxes, and adaptable "gear walls." Window treatment specialist Kevin Murphy shows Steve the custom shades and drapes ordered by mail, and A/V expert Mike Smith shows him an "out of the box" media room solution that won't break the bank. Roger literally lays the groundwork for a lush new lawn next spring with a three-layer customizable grass seed mat. Norm and coppersmith Larry Stearns install a TOH weathervane atop the finished garage, while Steve test-drives some high-tech toys for the new home office. Moments before the wrap party begins, interior designer Carolina Tress-Balsbaugh reveals her multi-textured interior design for the sunroom, living room and dining room.
The Lake Forest Dream Kitchen
24–19	"The Lake Forest Dream Kitchen - 1"	February 13, 2003
For the first time ever, This Old House let viewers choose the project. A nationwide Dream Kitchen search culminated in an online vote, with the Smith family of Lake Forest, Illinois, garnering the most votes. The challenge: Find more space in an old, cramped kitchen so homeowners Mike and Heidi Smith and their 5-year-old triplets can cook and eat in comfort. Plans for the 1928 Tudor include installing new custom cabinets and appliances, relocating an ill-placed powder room, and turning an old greenhouse into a new eating area at the front of the house. To allow the family to live in the house during the renovation, Richard Trethewey helps sets up a temporary kitchen on the sun porch, while Norm and Steve discuss design options with project architect John Krasnodebski. To contain dust and debris during demolition, the kitchen is sealed off from the rest of the house.
24–20	"The Lake Forest Dream Kitchen - 2"	February 20, 2003
The day begins in Lake Forest's historic Market Square. Built in 1916 by Chicago architect Howard Van Doren Shaw, the square is America's first drive-up shopping center. Back at the project house, demolition is already a distant memory as project manager Jim Eimerman shows Norm and Steve the plumbing and electrical rough-in, the new bath stripped and reframed, and the brickwork associated with moving windows underway. Steve and homeowner Heidi Smith visit a converted 1920's carriage house belonging to design/builder Kris Boyaris and her husband, architect John Krasnodebski. Steve and John discuss the challenges of squeezing a powder room into a former dead space along the hallway. Demolition has revealed several pipes wrapped in asbestos, so Norm catches up with an asbestos abatement team to see an alternative to removal: stabilization and containment.
24–21	"The Lake Forest Dream Kitchen - 3"	February 27, 2003
The Lake Forest project is well under way as Norm works in his temporary garage workshop making the bracketed posts to be used on the breakfast room's exterior. Steve meets up with project manager Jim Eimerman for an update: a dip in the floor has been addressed with a steel beam in the basement and the floor resheathed with plywood; new windows have arrived; a new concrete floor has been poured in the breakfast room; and the drywall is up. In a flashback, Norm sees polyurethane foam insulation blown into the walls. Steve and Heidi visit kitchen designer Eileen Thurnauer at a showroom in Hinsdale, Illinois, not far from the airport. Back on East Atteridge, Heidi puts some countertop materials through a stress test and Norm, Jim, and Steve work to install the posts and beam on the front section of the breakfast room.
24–22	"The Lake Forest Dream Kitchen - 4"	March 6, 2003
Steve and Norm arrive in Lake Forest to find local carpenters braving the cold, crafting custom cedar siding for the exterior of the kitchen addition. In the former greenhouse, Richard shows Steve how he saved the homeowners valuable real estate by putting radiant heat under the floors, and in the walls of the new eating area. Local historian Paul Bergmann shows Steve a shoreline mansion built in 1911 by one of Chicago's top architects, Benjamin Marshall. A reminder of a bygone era, it's for sale for $25 million. Project manager Jim Eimerman shows Norm the new steel beam in the basement, added to level out and support the kitchen floor above, and how the solution to this problem was the cause of another: the floor jacking caused substantial cracks in the plaster in other parts of the house.
24–23	"The Lake Forest Dream Kitchen - 5"	March 13, 2003
With temperatures hovering near zero, Steve brings Tom Silva to Lake Forest for the first time. Before heading to the project house, they decide to check up on project manager Jim Eimerman at one of the other jobs that he is running. Architect John Krasnodebski shows Steve and Tom a few ways to minimize the transition from drywall to brick in the new eating area. Steve tells Tom about a visit he and Norm made to Chicago's Museum of Science & Industry to see planes, trains, and a captured German submarine from World War II. In the Dream Kitchen, the new prefinished oak floor is installed as homeowner Heidi Smith and interior designer Suzanne Cederlund reveal the emerging plan for the kitchen design.
24–24	"The Lake Forest Dream Kitchen - 6"	March 20, 2003
Steve visits the Charles Glore House in Lake Forest to see what it's like to live in a house designed by Frank Lloyd Wright. Built in 1951, the Prairie style house's ongoing renovation is a labor of love for its current owner. Back at the project house, the cabinets have arrived in record time, and Norm recalls a recent visit to the heart of Pennsylvania Dutch country to see them being constructed and finished. In the front hall, painting contractor Ben Evangelista begins repairing the cracks in the plaster caused by jacking the kitchen floor. As promised, it is a quick fix with tape, mud and texturing. With only two weeks to go, project manager Jim Eimerman says he's already working weekends, but predicts he'll finish the job on time.
24–25	"The Lake Forest Dream Kitchen - 7"	March 27, 2003
On the way to the Lake Forest job site, Steve visits a stone fabrication shop to see where our Dream Kitchen countertops (an Italian sandstone known as Pietra del Cardoso) came from. Jim Kapcheck, a fourth-generation countertop fabricator, shows Steve what's hot in countertops and how his shop combines automation with hand-craftsmanship. At the job site, with only six working days left to go, project manager Jim Eimerman gives Steve a rundown of his punchlist. The countertops go in, Steve lends a hand setting the cast iron farm sink, and Richard installs an elaborate faucet system containing a retractable sprayer head and an undercover water filtration unit.
24–26	"The Lake Forest Dream Kitchen - 8"	April 3, 2003
After only 12 short weeks, the Dream Kitchen is complete, and Heidi Smith and the triplets are already moved in and cooking up treats for the wrap party. Steve sees how a decorative painter treated the inside of the new kitchen cabinets and learns how a new control device will coordinate over 40 individual lights to create different lighting "scenes" for the kitchen. Acclaimed Chicago chef Rick Bayless arrives to take the new kitchen for a test drive and to answer the question "How does a pro cook at home?", shows Steve the inviting, functional kitchen he created in his house on Chicago's North Side. Homeowner Mike Smith reveals that the job cost around $85,000 - which doesn't include all the donated products. In the real world, such a transformation would have been $200,000 and taken much longer. As This Old House wraps up its 24th season, Steve and Norm commend all involved on a job well done and heartily agree that from location to contractors to homeowners this was a "dream" project indeed, as This Old House wraps up its 24th season. Note: After 14 seasons and 364 half-hour episodes as the host, Steve Thomas says goodbye to This Old House.

== Season 25 (2003–04) ==
- Starting with this season, This Old House celebrated its 25th anniversary, and introduced its new host Kevin O'Connor.
- This season was creator Russell Morash's last as the executive Producer and director.
- Also starting with this season, This Old House goes into rerun on cable airing on Do it Yourself (DIY) Network. This didn't happen until February 2004.

No. in season	Title	Original release date
The Concord Cottage
25–01	"Turning a Garden Shed into a Home"	October 11, 2003
Norm Abram kicks off the 25th anniversary season of This Old House, with new host Kevin O'Connor, aboard with a visit to one of the most ambitious TOH jobs to date, the Manchester-by-the-Sea project. Wanting to tackle a big job like this one his first time out, Kevin instead ends up in historic Concord, Massachusetts, with a small (but sweet) 20- by 26-foot garden shed that homeowners Jeff and Janet Bernard want to convert into an in-law cottage for Janet's retired parents. Protected by local zoning laws, the shed can't be torn down and rebuilt, so Tom Silva will reframe the c. 1894 building from the inside out, and Richard Trethewey will face the challenges of bringing water, sewer, and gas lines into the building for the first time ever. The cottage is the smallest project in This Old House history, but everyone agrees that, although there's not a lot to work with, there's still a lot to do. Janet takes Kevin to see the inspiration for her project, a small garage apartment that's part of an estate currently on the market in Concord for $7.2 million.
25–02	"Roadblocks to Turning a Former Chicken Coop into a Cottage"	October 18, 2003
Work can't begin at the jobsite until permits are issued, so Kevin takes homeowner Janet Bernard to meet the Concord building commissioner, John Minty, to see what potential roadblocks she's facing in trying to turn an accessory building into a full-time residence. Then Kevin meets local architect Holly Cratsley to see a new home she designed to look like an old home, and an accompanying timber frame barn. Meanwhile, with flashlights, ladders, and archival photographs, Norm and preservation architect Leonard Baum reconstruct the architectural history of the project house, learning that the building started out as a one-story chicken coop with a hip roof, and that it is indeed older than the zoning law itself — a finding that's essential to moving forward with the town.
25–03	"Nothing is as Easy as it Looks"	October 25, 2003
Kevin arrives to find the newly issued building permit affixed to the building and work finally getting underway. Architect Holly Cratsley is officially on board, and Kevin pays a visit to her office to see the first pass at floor plans, elevations, and a scale model of the cottage. Zoning laws only allow for a modest increase in overall volume, so the new one-bedroom cottage will be less than 1,000 square feet when it's done. Norm and Tom prepare to brace a bowed wall, but find a badly rotted sill that needs replacing before they can proceed. Putting Kevin to work, they build two temporary walls; once they're in place, they take the weight off the compromised outside wall. The rotted sill comes out and a new, pressure-treated sill goes in. Then Kevin visits a converted carriage house in Winchester, Massachusetts, that's full of great ideas for the project. Unexpected rain postpones the excavation for the foundation of the new addition.
25–04	"It's Starting to Look Like a Cottage"	November 1, 2003
25–05	"Electrifying the Little Cottage"	November 8, 2013
25–06	"Adding to the Project"	November 15, 2003
25–07	"The Beauty and Challenges of Creating Small Living Spaces"	November 22, 2003
25–08	"Residential Window Manufacturing"	November 29, 2003
25–09	"Charming Touches for the Cottage"	December 6, 2003
25–10	"Cottage Living with the Future in Mind"	December 13, 2003
25–11	"Creating a Safe and Beautiful Home for Elders"	December 20, 2003
25–12	"Access to and Visions of a Beautiful Yard"	December 27, 2003
25–13	"Lots of Activity Outside"	January 3, 2004
25–14	"Custom Details Give the Cottage Personal Touches"	January 10, 2004
25–15	"Everyone's Here to Get the Job Done"	January 17, 2004
25–16	"Making and Installing Engineered Flooring"	January 24, 2004
25–17	"One Installation After Another"	February 1, 2004
25–18	"Once a Barn, Now a Beautiful Home"	February 8, 2004
The Bermuda House
25–19	"Sailing the Atlantic for the Next Project in Bermuda"	February 15, 2004
25–20	"Restoring the Inn with Native Limestone"	February 22, 2004
25–21	"Appreciating a Whole Different Type of Construction"	February 28, 2004
25–22	"Collecting Water"	March 7, 2004
25–23	"Making Way for the Custom Built Mantel"	March 14, 2004
25–24	"Challenges and Rewards of Island Building"	March 21, 2004
25–25	"Beautiful Finishes Create Beautiful Spaces"	March 28, 2004
25–26	"Finishing the Project, Bermuda-Style"	April 4, 2004

== Season 26 (2004–05) ==
- Kevin O'Connor's second season as the host.

No. in season	Title	Original release date
The Carlisle House
26–01	"Celebrating 25 Years of Home Renovation"	October 9, 2004
26–02	"Appreciating the Past"	October 16, 2004
26–03	"A Different Kind of Barn Raising"	October 23, 2004
26–04	"Saving Old Barns for New Homes"	October 30, 2004
26–05	"Foundation Installation Begins"	November 6, 2004
26–06	"Prefab Systems Speed Things Up"	November 13, 2004
26–07	"Passing on the Trades"	November 20, 2004
26–08	"Not Your Grandfather's Farmhouse"	November 27, 2004
26–09	"Envisioning the Kitchen"	December 4, 2004
26–10	"Shaping the Spaces"	December 11, 2004
26–11	"Design Elements Make a House Special"	December 18, 2004
26–12	"Many Hands Make a Beautiful Fireplace"	December 25, 2004
26–13	"Digging for Water"	January 1, 2005
26–14	"Enhancing the House With Stone and Paint"	January 8, 2005
26–15	"Living in a Barn"	January 15, 2005
26–16	"New Technologies for an Old Farmhouse"	January 22, 2005
26–17	"History of the Greek-Revival"	January 29, 2005
26–18	"Shutting Out the Cold"	February 5, 2005
26–19	"Keeping It Old"	February 12, 2005
26–20	"Prefab Meets Custom"	February 19, 2005
26–21	"Mantel Troubles"	February 26, 2005
26–22	"Modern Conveniences"	March 5, 2005
26–23	"All the Comforts of Home"	March 12, 2005
26–24	"Designer Show House"	March 19, 2005
26–25	"More Designer Show House"	March 26, 2005
26–26	"A Farmhouse for the Next 100 Years"	April 2, 2005

== Season 27 (2005–06) ==
- Kevin O'Connor's third season as the host.

No. in season	Title	Original release date
The Cambridge House
27–01	"A Modern Old House"	October 6, 2005
27–02	"Modernize, Again"	October 13, 2005
27–03	"Worst-Case Scenario"	October 20, 2005
27–04	"Longfellow's House"	October 27, 2005
27–05	"The Cost of Poor Workmanship"	November 3, 2005
27–06	"High-Tech Heating and Cooling"	November 10, 2005
27–07	"Water Damage Brings Opportunity"	November 17, 2005
27–08	"Real Stone, Flat Roof"	November 24, 2005
27–09	"A Water-Feature Welcome"	December 1, 2005
27–10	"Creating a Dramatic Entryway"	December 8, 2005
27–11	"Rain Slows Some Progress"	December 15, 2005
27–12	"Dramatic Staircase"	December 22, 2005
27–13	"Interior Finishes Begin"	December 29, 2005
27–14	"Fine Craftsmanship"	January 5, 2006
27–15	"Contemporary Design Elements"	January 12, 2006
27–16	"Modern Conveniences in a Modern Home"	January 17, 2006
27–17	"Things Are Coming Together"	January 24, 2006
27–18	"A Red Box Becomes a Show House"	February 1, 2006
The Washington, D.C. House
27–19	"Reviving an Abandoned 1879 Rowhouse"	February 8, 2006
27–20	"Setbacks Open Up New Ideas"	February 15, 2006
27–21	"Honoring the Past, Looking Toward the Future"	February 22, 2006
27–22	"A Rebuilt Structure"	March 1, 2006
27–23	"Beautiful Historic Restorations"	March 8, 2006
27–24	"The Outside is Shaping Up, Too"	March 15, 2006
27–25	"Surface Finishes"	March 22, 2006
27–26	"A Home Saved"	March 29, 2006

== Season 28 (2006–07) ==
- Kevin O'Connor's fourth season as the host.
- This is the last season to broadcast in 480i SDTV.

No. in season	Title	Original release date
The East Boston House
28–01	"A Tale of Two Homes"	October 5, 2006
28–02	"Stucco and Sewer Problems"	October 12, 2006
28–03	"Design and Demolition"	October 19, 2006
28–04	"Urban Garden, Asbestos, City Sewer"	October 26, 2006
28–05	"Refrigerator, Hot Plate, and Bad Larry"	November 2, 2006
28–06	"Salvage, Chimney, Attic, and the ICA"	November 9, 2006
28–07	"Ivy Be Gone"	November 16, 2006
28–08	"Progress, Patching and Packing Up"	November 23, 2006
28–09	"Local Heroes"	November 30, 2006
28–10	"On The Waterfront"	December 7, 2006
28–11	"Renovating in Eastie"	December 7, 2006
28–12	"Roofing, Shower Pan, Surge Suppression"	December 14, 2006
28–13	"Patching Walls, Inside and Out"	December 21, 2006
28–14	"Floors in Eastie and at the BSO"	December 28, 2006
28–15	"Modern, Traditional, and Boston Light"	January 4, 2007
28–16	"Off To The Races"	January 11, 2007
28–17	"The House With the White Picket Fence"	January 18, 2007
28–18	"Upstairs, Downstairs–Complete!"	January 25, 2007
The Austin House
28–19	"Where Green Building Was Born"	February 2, 2007
28–20	"Chasing Five Stars"	February 7, 2007
28–21	"The Great State of Texas"	February 14, 2007
28–22	"Trethewey in Texas"	February 21, 2007
28–23	"Keeping Austin Weird"	February 28, 2007
28–24	"Harvesting Water and Wind"	March 7, 2007
28–25	"Green is Good"	March 14, 2007
28–26	"Finished House and Five Stars!"	March 21, 2007

== Season 29 (2007–08) ==
- Kevin O'Connor's fifth season as the host.
- Starting with this season, This Old House and Ask This Old House began broadcasting in HDTV.
- This is the last season to have the This Old House theme song; "This Old House '97", composed by Peter Bell.

No. in season	Title	Original release date
Newton Shingle-Style House
29–01	"Move or Improve?"	October 6, 2007
This Old House kicks off its 29th season, where Kevin O’Connor and Norm Abram arrive at the latest project house in Newton, Massachusetts. Built in 1897, the house is a Colonial Revival in "Shingle-style clothes" – a typical transitional-style house from the late Victorian era. Nearby, homeowners Paul Friedberg, Madeline Krauss and their two young sons are moving out of old centre hall Colonial. After struggling with the "move or improve" conundrum, they decided to move AND improve. On a tour of the "new" old house, Norm and general contractor Tom Silva review the good news – an exterior in pretty good shape and beautiful intact woodwork – and the bad news – some structural issues and a disconnected, sorely outdated kitchen. Upstairs, they find extensive plaster damage, bathrooms in need of updating and an old enclosed sleeping porch that will become part of the new master suite. Architect Treff LaFleche shows Kevin and the homeowners his plan for opening up the kitchen and adding a mudroom, while also explaining how these rooms will be connected to the rest of the house and the backyard. Plumbing and heating expert Richard Trethewey surveys the state of the mechanicals, while landscape contractor Roger Cook exposes problems with the steep grade in the backyard, drainage, and wood-to-ground contact. Note: This is the first This Old House episode to broadcast in HDTV.
29–02	"Big Plans"	October 13, 2007
Host Kevin O’Connor meets landscape architect Stephanie Hubbard to see her plan that calls for minimal changes out front, but major work in the back to re-grade and create a large new patio. In the old kitchen, general contractor Tom Silva recaps the plan, while master carpenter Norm Abram and homeowner Paul Friedberg begins demolition. In the basement, plumbing and heating expert Richard Trethewey shows Kevin how to loosen a stuck sewer cap. Kevin visits a state-of-the-art facility in Westborough, Massachusetts, where the crew's construction and demolition waste is sorted for recycling. Chimney expert Mark Schaub evaluates the 100-year old chimney flues with the help of a "flue cam," which is monitored on a laptop computer. Landscape contractor Roger Cook cuts down the giant yews that have been obscuring the front of the house for decades.
29–03	"Prepwork and Inspiration"	October 20, 2007
Host Kevin O’Connor finds general contractor Tom Silva in the backyard prepping the footings for the new porch columns. Landscape contractor Roger Cook brings in civil engineer Mike Kosmo to do the perk test needed for the new landscape plan. To learn more about the form, architect Treff LaFleche shows Kevin a stunning neighbourhood Shingle-style house that he purchased, renovated, and sold three years ago. The turn-of-the-century home features a curved wrap-around porch, dramatic entry hall, charming inglenook, and, similar to the renovation plans the team has in store, it has a new open kitchen and family room that connect visually with the rest of the house. Back on site, Roger finds certified arborist Matt Foti removing a rotted red maple from the side yard with a tree crew and crane.
29–04	"Framing, Wiring, and an Unfitted Kitchen"	October 27, 2007
General contractor Tom Silva removes the temporary support beam that has been holding up the back corner of the house. Meanwhile, engineered lumber specialist Craig Smith shows master carpenter Norm Abram the "green" framing materials to be used in the new kitchen. Norm, Tom and host Kevin O’Connor remove the old kitchen walls and install a new 16 foot beam to open up the space. Master electrician Allen Gallant shows Norm how the shoddy wiring installed over the years has created unsafe conditions and code violations throughout the house. Kitchen showroom co-owner Yael Peleg presents her vision for an "unfitted kitchen," while kitchen designer Donna Venegas shows Kevin and homeowner Maddy Krauss how the concept is incorporated into the floor plans and design choices. Back in Newton, Tom and Kevin reframe the structure of the floor under the master closet to strengthen, level and tie it in with the rest of the floor in the new master bath.
29–05	"Retaining Wall, Historic Wallcovering"	November 3, 2007
Landscape contractor Roger Cook installs 200 running feet of pre-cast concrete to create a retaining wall that will define the perimeter of the new backyard. Inside the house, wallpaper historian Richard Nylander helps host Kevin O’Connor date and evaluate the historic wallpaper throughout the house, while general contractor Tom Silva frames for a new window in an old wall. Kevin makes a trip to Cambridge, Massachusetts, to see how three 19th century buildings are being moved as part of a construction project at Harvard Law School. The million-dollar move, which has been planned for five years, requires the buildings to be lifted and rolled down Massachusetts Avenue on hydraulic dollies steered by remote control.
29–06	"Exterior Paint Colors, Stained-Glass Window"	November 10, 2007
After a brief stop at Johnny's Luncheonette for breakfast, host Kevin O’Connor meets paint colour specialist Ann Pfaff to learn what colours might be appropriate for the Shingle-style house. Back in Newton, general contractor Tom Silva and master carpenter Norm Abram build the 12-foot wall of the new kitchen bump out that will contain a built-in bench for the kitchen table. In the South End of Boston, Kevin visits stained glass designer Jim Anderson at his workshop to see the restoration and rebuilding of the home's four historic windows. In the home's backyard, under the new porch, landscape contractor Roger Cook uses a pay-as-you-go concrete truck to pour a small buttress wall that will support the exposed rubble stone foundation.
29–07	"Salvage, Progress, and Pink Granite"	November 17, 2007
Host Kevin O’Connor drives up to the house to find general contractor Tom Silva helping load up a truck for the "Building Materials Resource Centre," a local non-profit organisation that will be selling the project's surplus materials to needy homeowners at discounted prices. Inside the house, Tom shows Kevin the progress on the porch, kitchen and master bath, where his crew is installing several new windows. In the basement, plumbing and heating expert Richard Trethewey gives an update on the mechanical systems. To learn more about the home's Milford Pink granite foundation being a sign of wealth at the time the house was built, architect Treff LaFleche takes Kevin to see how the same stone was used on the Boston Public Library, and also how the granite is quarried and split to best match the home's existing stone. Back on site, Roger installs the new Milford Pink granite, and also matches the old mortar.
29–08	"Fieldstone, Replacement Windows, and Teak"	November 24, 2007
Host Kevin O’Connor and plumbing and heating expert Richard Trethewey stop to see Echo Bridge, a 500-foot long arched structure built in 1976 to carry water over the Charles River. Back at the project house, landscape contractor Roger Cook digs up a large, established shrub by the front walkway which will be transplanted to the backyard to help with screening. Roger also shows Kevin how work on the new fieldstone sitting wall is progressing. In the first floor parlour, general contractor Tom Silva shows Kevin how to install a replacement window. Meanwhile, Richard adds radiant heat panels under the entry hall, a great solution for warming an area that was not previously heated. PEX water pipe goes into the kitchen, while master carpenter Norm Abram travels to Germansville, Pennsylvania to see how countertop fabricator Paul Grothouse is crafting a beautiful three inch teak island top for the house.
29–09	"Pests, Decking, and AC"	December 1, 2007
Host Kevin O’Connor sees how landscape contractor Roger Cook is building the fieldstone and mortar sitting wall. Meanwhile, master carpenter Norm Abram shows homeowner Paul Friedberg troublesome conditions with the wood-to-ground contact on the side of the house, underneath the front porch, and at the garage. Pest control expert Bill Seigel comes to the rescue with a treatment to stop the termite activity and prevent further damage. General contractor Tom Silva shows Kevin the new stepped dowel fastening system he is using to put down the decking. Architect Treff LaFleche takes Kevin to see a riff on the Shingle-style brand new home he designed that looks traditional on the outside, but features clean, wide open, modern spaces on the inside. Up in the attic, plumbing and heating expert Richard Trethewey shows Norm the air handlers, and how the high velocity mini-duct system lets him easily feed conditioned air to the second and third floors.
29–10	"Bluestone and a Historic Billiards Room"	December 8, 2007
Host Kevin O’Connor runs with marathon champion Bill Rodgers to find out why Heartbreak Hill is a challenge for runners of the Boston Marathon. Back in Newton, painting contractor Jim Clark and crew are prepping the exterior of the house for paint. Landscape contractor Roger Cook shows Kevin the progress on the bluestone patio and massive bluestone stairs. The patio is set in sand, instead of stone dust, to meet the permeability requirements of the town. General contractor Tom Silva shows Kevin how he is wrapping the exterior columns with shingles woven together in a hand-crafted, flared detail at the base. Upstairs, spray foam insulation is put in the open bays of the new work and injected into the soffits of the old work. In the third floor billiards room, lighting restoration expert Scott Sweeny demonstrates several options for adapting an antique light fixture to meet modern needs. Pool table expert Steve Kelly arrives to dismantle the antique pool table for off-site restoration.
29–11	"Bringing Light Throughout"	December 13, 2007
Progress on the home's exterior painting continues. General contractor Tom Silva shows host Kevin O’Connor how he is wrapping the columns under the back porch in shingles. Preservation plasterer Rory Brennan shows master carpenter Norm Abram how he's saving the old plaster in the billiards room using a new adhesive system. He also shows Norm how to replicate an authentic corner bead detail from the 1890s. Kevin meets homeowner Madeline Krauss and her interior designer, Abbey Koplovitz, to see their selections for the home's lighting, paint colours and furnishings. In nearby Somerville, Massachusetts, Norm visits billiard restorer Steve Kelly's showroom and workshop to see rare and valuable antique pool tables, and also to see how work on the pool table is progressing.
29–12	"Garage Nightmare and Garbage Disposers"	December 22, 2007
A local nursery brings plants to the house. General contractor Tom Silva addresses some unforeseen rotting problems with the garage. Inside, the kitchen is plastered, the new white oak flooring is down and the cabinets have just arrived from Kitchener, Canada. Flooring contractor Steve Dubuque shows master carpenter Norm Abram how he is layering aniline dye, stain and polyurethane to achieve the floor colour the homeowners are seeking. Plumbing and heating contractor Richard Trethewey travels to Racine, Wisconsin, to see how one manufacturer is making a new generation of kitchen garbage disposers. Tom installs a new standing seam copper roof over the back porch. In the master bath, Kevin finds tile contractor Joe Ferrante setting up for a major tile job – the first step is waterproofing the shower by using a paint-on, flexible, seamless, waterproofing membrane.
29–13	"Getting The Details Right"	December 29, 2007
Host Kevin O’Connor talks with homeowner Paul Friedberg to learn more about Paul's past as an Olympic fencer. Master carpenter Norm Abram checks on the installation of the new custom garage doors. Cabinet installer Patrick Malone finishes the job by scribing his base moulding the floor. General contractor Tom Silva shows Kevin how he is giving a stock masonite door a face lift by adding an oak veneer and new oak mouldings. In the master bath, tile contractor Joe Ferrante shows Kevin how he is laying the mosaic "rug" tiles in front of the new vanity. Kitchen designer Donna Venegas shows Norm the countertop and tile choices for the kitchen, while template maker Kent Whitten creates the templates using digital technology. Landscape contractor Roger Cook works with an irrigation contractor to add both sprinkler heads and drip irrigation to the landscape before the cold weather sets in.
29–14	"In Memory of Joe Ferrante"	January 5, 2008
Landscape contractor Roger Cook installs sod in the backyard while host Kevin O’Connor meets engineered stone distributor Chelsie Arnold to learn more about the quartz and resin countertops being installed in the kitchen. Plumbing and heating expert Richard Trethewey shows Kevin the new high-efficiency air conditioning system. Kevin then helps general contractor Tom Silva fabricate new wainscoting for the kitchen. In the front hall, painting contractor Jim Clark shows Kevin how the oak woodwork paneling, newel posts, banisters and balusters are cleaned using liquid TSP and a little elbow grease. In the upstairs hall, the damaged wood requires stripping and re-staining. The day ends with the sad news that tile contractor Joe Ferrante has unexpectedly died.
29–15	"Grout, Closets, and a Clawfoot Tub"	January 12, 2008
Host Kevin O’Connor checks out general contractor Tom Silva's makeshift workshop on the front porch of the house. Inside, countertop fabricator Paul Grothouse arrives from Pennsylvania to install the end grain teak island top and deliver its companion piece "a custom teak farmhouse table" for the breakfast area. Plumbing and heating expert Richard Trethewey displays the progress on the second floor bath and meets tub refinisher Jack Donaruma on the third floor to see him strip and refinish the old claw-foot tub. In the master closet, Kevin finds the room painted and closet designer Brian McSharry is installing a custom closet system. Back in the kitchen, tile contractor Mark Ferrante shows Kevin how he uses wedges to create even grout lines on the uneven handmade tile backsplash. Tom shows master carpenter Norm Abram how he uses portable lathe to turn a new newel post finial out of walnut. In the billiards room, pool table expert Steve Kelly reassembles the restored antique pool table and finally gets to play a game of pool with Norm.
29–16	"Winter Wrap Party"	January 19, 2008
In the final episode of the Newton project, host Kevin O’Connor meets lighting designer Susan Arnold to see how she is using new light sources and more modern fixtures to update the formerly dark areas of the house. Greg Smizer, Larry Schulman, and Eric Reinhardt install the security system, plasma televisions, and audio systems while Meghan Hodge installs window treatments. Landscape contractor Roger Cook inspects the finished garage and meets landscape architect Stephanie Hubbard to see the finished back porch and terrace. Homeowner Paul Friedberg and his sons break in their new backyard with a game of Home Run Derby. Architect Treff LaFleche hangs a historical marker out front. Designer Abbey Koplovitz and homeowner Madeline Krauss display how they have pulled together the interior with paint colours, custom furniture, window treatments, rugs and family antiques. Plumbing and heating expert Richard Trethewey tests the new digitally controlled shower system in the master bath while master carpenter Norm Abram tours the finished kitchen with designer Donna Venegas. As the wrap party begins, the team gathers on the front porch to toast general contractor Tom Silva on a job well done.
New Orleans Rebuilds
29–17	"Return to New Orleans, Post Katrina"	January 26, 2008
For the second project of the season, This Old House travels to New Orleans, Louisiana, to help a fourth-generation resident of the Lower Ninth ward return home while following stories of rebuilding and recovery throughout the city. Host Kevin O’Connor visits Musicians’ Village with founder Harry Connick Jr. to see how he, along with childhood friend Branford Marsalis, are providing new housing for the city's musicians through Habitat for Humanity. In historic Holy Cross, along the banks of the Mississippi River, homeowner Rashida Ferdinand shows Kevin why she loves her c.1892 flood-damaged shotgun single and artist's studio. Rashida tells Kevin her plans to restore and expand the property after a two-year vacancy. Master carpenter Norm Abram meets Rashida's builder to assess the challenges of building post-Katrina in New Orleans. Homeowner Marna David shows Kevin how she managed to renovate her own shotgun single in Holy Cross, twice – once before the storm and once after.
29–18	"Camelbacks, Bargeboard, and Toxic Mold"	February 2, 2008
Host Kevin O’Connor meets homeowner Rashida Ferdinand and her architect Rick Fifield to look at the plans and model of the proposed work on her shotgun single. The plan calls for a "camelback" addition that will house a master suite and a new family room with back and side porches to take advantage of the cool river breezes. As demolition begins inside, builder Carl Hithe shows master carpenter Norm Abram how the house was originally constructed from dismantled bargeboards taken from vessels that once travelled down the Mississippi. At Musicians’ Village, Kevin meets Executive Director Jim Pate to see how Habitat for Humanity's houses are constructed post-Katrina. As work progresses at Rashida's house, the discovery of toxic mould is a setback, until mould remediation expert Dr. Eric Griggs arrives to begin a whole-house remediation and prevention program for the old part of the house.
29–19	"French Quarter, Shotgun Colors"	February 9, 2008
Host Kevin O’Connor visits the French Quarter with Vieux Carre Commission Director Lary Hesdorffer to see how one of the most well-known neighbourhoods in America held up during the storm. At the project house in Holy Cross, master carpenter Norm Abram works on the side porch while homeowner Rashida Ferdinand strips paint from the historic windows that will be reused on her home. Paint colour consultant Louis Aubert shows Kevin how he is bringing colour to the project house along with other homes in the neighbourhood with bright colour schemes applied in a historic and accurate manner. At Musicians’ Village, Norm and Kevin lend a hand to some of the volunteers who are raising walls, laying decking and installing windows, one house at a time.
29–20	"Saints in the City"	February 16, 2008
Master carpenter Norm Abram takes host Kevin O’Connor on a ferry ride across the Mississippi River to Algiers Point, to see how the first This Old House New Orleans project, completed in 1990, held up during Hurricane Katrina. Back in Holy Cross, plumbing and heating expert Richard Trethewey shows Norm the plumbing layout and how HVAC contractor Raul Mena plans to heat and cool the house. Across town in Broadmoor, Norm and Kevin help install windows with the non-profit group Rebuilding Together. The group is renovating a house for wheelchair-using homeowner Sonia St. Cyr at no cost to her. At Musicians’ Village, founder Branford Marsalis shows Kevin around and introduces him to the youngest resident in the village, saxophonist Calvin Johnson, who joins Branford in a duet of "When the Saints Go Marching In." Despite debris at the jobsite, landscape architect Brian Sublette starts working with homeowner Rashida Ferdinand to draw up a plan for her yard and gardens.
29–21	"First Builder Falls Through"	February 23, 2008
Host Kevin O’Connor and master carpenter Norm Abram visit the neighbourhood jazz clubs of Frenchman Street, the local's alternative to Bourbon Street, where the music scene is still alive and well. At the project house in Holy Cross, homeowner Rashida Ferdinand receives surprising news- her contractor cannot complete the job. Although Rashida is hiring someone new she is filling in herself to bridge the gap between builders. Rashida has managed to obtain rough inspections and spray foam insulation gets underway in the new addition. Norm visits carpenter Matt Thompson at his renovated house and shop in Bywater to see how he is milling the historically accurate French doors out of Spanish cedar. At Musicians’ Village, founder Branford Marsalis shows Norm the plans for the music education and performance centre that will be built in honour of his father, Ellis Marsalis.
29–22	"Back on Track"	March 1, 2009
Host Kevin O'Connor and master carpenter Norm Abram take a ride through the city of New Orleans with streetcar driver Sue Daniel, who is known locally as "Streetcar Sue." At the project house in Holy Cross, Norm catches up with homeowner Rashida Ferdinand's new general contractor Larry Schneider to see the amazing progress he has made in just two short weeks on the job. At Musicians' Village, saxophonist Calvin Johnson shows Norm how he is investing sweat equity toward the 350 hours required to become a homeowner in the neighbourhood. Back at the project house, lead carpenter Mike Gettle shows Kevin how he is trimming the side porch. In Central City, Kevin meets Mercy Corps program director Rick Denhart to learn how the non-profit organisation helps homeowners in New Orleans desconstruct their ruined properties at no cost. The salvaged materials are given to local depots where they are sold at a reduced price. The last stop in the process is the Green Project in St. Roch where the goods are bought and sold by members of the community.
29–23	"Recovery Continues"	March 8, 2008
Host Kevin O'Connor visits the architectural marvel next door to the project house, the Dollut Steamboat house, with its owner Don Gagnon. At the project house, master carpenter Norm Abram meets with homeowner Rashida Ferdinand and general contractor Larry Schneider for a progress tour. In addition to painting and flooring, the cabinets are mostly up in the new kitchen. Installer Oliver Earl shows Norm both the architectural detail and finish detail of the cabinetry. Countertop contractor John Finney uses laser technology to make templates for the new quartz countertops. At Musicians' Village, general contractor Tom Silva is on hand for the morning meeting and gives construction assistant Danielle Draper a lesson in making a window stool and apron. In Central City, Kevin meets Craig Cuccia to see how his non-profit group rebuilds the lives of at-risk youth through a unique hospitality and construction program. Back at the project house, Norm and Tom help lead carpenter Mike Gettle put down the reclaimed pine engineered flooring in the future family room.
29–24	"Landscapes and NBA Legends"	March 15, 2008
Host Kevin O'Connor and landscape contractor Roger Cook visit Mother's Restaurant, a 70-year-old tradition on Poydras Street, to sample the local cuisine. At the project house in Holy Cross, Roger meets landscape architect Brian Sublette to see how he is creating both public and private space on the sizable lot. Fencing specialist Mark Bushway is on hand to install the green privacy fence, arbor, and gates that will go up in the side yard. Deryl Boudreau installs a standby generator on the other side of the house. Two blocks away, master carpenter Norm Abram meets Global Green executive director Beth Galante to learn how the non-profit organization is building a sustainable and affordable housing development in the neighbourhood with the participation of actor Brad Pitt. Back at the project house, countertop contractor John Finney arrives with the countertops for the kitchen. Upstairs in the master bath, tile contractor Fred Foltmer shows Kevin the travertine floor and the glass tile going up in the shower area. Over at Musicians' Village, under the watchful eye of pianist Ellis Marsalis, Kevin finds NBA Legends Willis Reed and Robert Parish lending a hand along with local hero Tyson Chandler from the New Orleans Hornets. All of the players have local ties and are committed to keeping the national spotlight on the ongoing housing crisis in New Orleans.
29–25	"Only In New Orleans"	March 22, 2008
Host Kevin O'Connor meets with District Fire Chief Tim McConnell to see how his own firemen, with the help of volunteers and the Denis Leary Foundation in New York City, are rebuilding 22 damaged firehouses on their own time. In Holy Cross, master carpenter Norm Abram drives up to the project house to find plants arriving and master mason Teddy Pierre Jr. laying local St. Joe brick on the front walk. Lead carpenter Mike Gettle installs new custom composite shutters that are functional for privacy and security and also meet the Historic District guidelines. The mechanicals, including a new continuous flow tankless water heater are also in place. In the French Quarter, Kevin stops by Bevolo Lighting to see how Drew Bevolo, a third generation lighting fixture manufacturer, is carrying on the family tradition while also building lights for our project. At Musicians' Village, landscape contractor Roger Cook helps the volunteers establish grade and plant screening shrubs and grasses in homeowner Calvin Johnson's front yard.
29–26	"One Small Corner Restored"	March 29, 2008
Host Kevin O'Connor opens the show as the Krewe of Zulu prepares for Mardi Gras. At the project house in Holy Cross, landscape contractor Roger Cook finds metal worker Joe Strain finishing the installation of the "hoop and scroll" iron fence in the front yard. General contractor Tom Silva meets pest control contractor Wayne Zimmerman to see the work going on under (and around) the house to protect it from termites. Plumbing and heating expert Richard Trethewey looks at the final paint colour scheme with colourist Louis Aubert then checks inside on the new laundry area and first floor bath. Master carpenter Norm Abram reviews the punch list with lead carpenter Mike Gettle. Furniture maker Bill Taber arrives with two custom tables that he made out of the old bargeboard walls that came down in the renovation. At Musicians' Village, five months of following the progress is concluded with the dedication ceremony at Calvin Johnson's house. Uptown, the party continues as Kevin "rolls" with the Zulus down St. Charles Avenue on Mardi Gras Day. The next day at the project house, landscape architect Brian Sublette gives a final tour of the front garden and side yard. Inside, homeowner Rashida Ferdinand and her interior designer Nancy Robbins show Kevin the choices they made to blend the old house with the new addition while using Rashida's artwork to personalize the spaces. Knowing that many folks in New Orleans are still struggling, the whole crew celebrates the completion of Rashida's house, and the rebirth of one small corner of the city, as This Old House wraps up its 29th season.

== Season 30 (2008–09) ==
- Kevin O'Connor's sixth season as the host.
- This Old House celebrates its 30th anniversary.
- Beginning with this season, This Old House introduced a new theme song to celebrate the show's 30th anniversary.

No. in season	Title	Original release date
The Weston House
30–01	"A Prefab Timberframe Project House Begins"	October 2, 2008
30–02	"House Plan Virtual Tour"	October 9, 2008
30–03	"Even the Foundation is Prefabricated!"	October 16, 2008
30–04	"Prefabricating Inside and Out"	October 23, 2008
30–05	"Raising in the Rain"	October 30, 2008
30–06	"Raising Timbers"	November 6, 2008
30–07	"Modular Rooms"	November 13, 2008
30–08	"Closing Up the House"	November 20, 2008
30–09	"Rock Stars"	November 27, 2008
30–10	"Bringing Things Together"	December 4, 2008
30–11	"Making A Mark"	December 11, 2008
30–12	"Natural Surfaces and the Latest Appliances"	December 17, 2008
30–13	"Keeping it Green Outside"	December 24, 2008
30–14	"LEED Requirements"	December 31, 2008
30–15	"Amy Lends a Hand"	January 7, 2009
30–16	"The Weston Timberframe Complete"	January 14, 2009
The New York City House
30–17	"A TOH Brownstone In Brooklyn"	January 21, 2009
30–18	"Classic New York"	January 28, 2009
30–19	"Preservation & Planning"	February 4, 2009
30–20	"In with the New"	February 11, 2009
30–21	"Making it Their Own"	February 18, 2009
30–22	"Restoring and Replacing"	February 25, 2009
30–23	"Made In New York"	March 4, 2009
30–24	"The Dream Team"	March 11, 2009
30–25	"Wood Finishes Restored to Original Brilliance"	March 18, 2009
30–26	"This Brownstone is Beautiful Once Again"	March 25, 2009
