= Haven Gillespie =

American songwriter (1888–1975)

- Also known as: Haven Gillespie
- Born: James Haven Lamont Gillespie; February 6, 1888; Covington, Kentucky
- Origin: Covington, Kentucky, United States
- Died: March 14, 1975 (aged 87) Las Vegas, Nevada
- Occupations: Composer, lyricist

James Lamont Gillespie (February 6, 1888 – March 14, 1975), known under the pen name Haven Gillespie, was an American Tin Pan Alley composer and lyricist. He was the writer of "You Go to My Head", "Honey", "By the Sycamore Tree", "That Lucky Old Sun", "Breezin' Along With The Breeze", "Right or Wrong," "Beautiful Love", "Drifting and Dreaming", and "Louisiana Fairy Tale" (Fats Waller's recording of which was used as the first theme song in the PBS Production of This Old House), each song in collaboration with other people such as Beasley Smith, Ervin R. Schmidt, Richard A. Whiting, Wayne King, J. Fred Coots, and Loyal Curtis. He also wrote the seasonal standard "Santa Claus Is Comin' to Town".

== Life and career ==
Gillespie was one of nine children of Anna (Reilley) and William F. Gillespie. The family was poor and lived in the basement of a house on Third Street between Madison Avenue and Russell Street in Covington, Kentucky. Gillespie dropped out of school in grade four and could not find a job. His older sister, Lillian, had married John Hewling, who was in the printing business and the couple moved to Chicago. Lillian had written Haven that there was a job waiting for him there and that he could live with them. In 1902, Haven left his Covington home to join his sister and brother-in-law.

A few years later, Gillespie began corresponding to a childhood sweetheart back in Covington. In 1908, he proposed marriage to Corene Parker by way of a postcard. The couple married on March 9, 1909, in Corene's Covington home. She was 19 and Haven was 21. He had fifteen dollars in his pocket and she had just one dollar given to her by her mother. Gillespie soon landed a job as a typesetter for the Cincinnati Times-Star, ultimately maintaining his membership in the International Typographic Union until his death. He found work as a "plug" man, entertaining audiences at local vaudeville shows by playing and singing songs he had written.

They had only one child, Haven Lamont Gillespie, who was born January 10, 1910.

His first break came in 1911 when he met Roy Steventon, performing with Mildred Lovejoy in a dancing act at the Keith Theater in Cincinnati. Gillespie and Steventon teamed up on three songs for the act, "You're Just The Girl I've Met In My Dreams", "When I Am Gone", and "Winter Time Is Coming Around Too Soon." Haven was paid one and a half cents for each piece of sheet music sold, total royalties which amounted to only a few dollars over the next several years.

While touring to promote his songwriting, Gillespie began drinking heavily and would struggle with alcohol addiction most of his life. At age 23 and after a long night of drinking, he met Joe Ford, a printer with the Cincinnati Tribune. Ford took Haven home to sober up and the two men eventually developed a lifelong friendship.

Gillespie's first major hit came in early 1925 with "Drifting and Dreaming." Many of his songs were inspired by chance moments in his life. He left for New York and became a journalist and composer of songs for vaudeville shows. He first gained notice in 1925 with "Breezin Along With The Breeze", in collaboration with Egbert Van Alstyne, Ervin R. Schmidt, and Loyal Curtis, which was recorded by Josephine Baker among many others.

Gillespie was the great great uncle of actor Jack Haven.

== Collaborators ==
Gillespie worked in collaboration with many other artists including:

- J. Fred Coots
- Lee David
- Peter DeRose
- Earl Edmonds
- Byron Gay
- Lloyd Kidwell
- Jack Little
- Henry Marshall
- Billy Moll
- Neil Moret
- Mitchell Parish
- Larry Shay
- Seymour Simons
- Beasley Smith
- George (Roy) Steventon
- Charles Tobias
- Henry Tobias
- Rudy Vallée
- Egbert Van Alstyne
- Pete Wendling
- Richard Whiting
- Victor Young

He also wrote songs recorded by:

- Louis Armstrong
- Michael Jackson
- Dean Martin
- Frank Sinatra
- Bruce Springsteen
- George Strait
- Sarah Vaughan
- Margaret Whiting

He was inducted into the Songwriters Hall of Fame in 1972. His copyrights are now owned by the Haven Gillespie Music Publishing Company, managed by the Gillespie family.

== Discography ==
- Dream Dust (1938), writer
