= Louisiana Fairy Tale =

Song

Song
- Released: 1935
- Genre: Jazz
- Composer: Haven Gillespie
- Lyricists: Mitchell Parish, J. Fred Coots

"Louisiana Fairy Tale" (or "Louisiana Fairytale") is a song written in 1935 by Haven Gillespie, with lyrics by Mitchell Parish and J. Fred Coots, and was originally popularized by Fats Waller.

Waller's version opens with him playing a four-bar solo piano lead-in to a clarinet melody backed by drums, guitar, clarinet, trumpet and piano. A muted trumpet bridge precedes Waller's vocal verses, and a Dixieland-style improvisational instrumental jam closes the recording.

The instrumental introduction was used as the theme for Austin City Limits from 1977 to 1981 (Seasons 2-6), and the original theme for the PBS television series This Old House from 1979 to 2002 (Seasons 1–23).

In 1990 Librarian of Congress James H. Billington presented Louisiana congresswoman Lindy Boggs with "three gifts" from the collection of the Library of Congress, including "a facsimile of sheet music for a 1935 piece, 'Louisiana Fairy Tale,' accompanied by a cassette of the music with Fats Waller on piano and vocal".

In 2010 the song was part of a mid-week New Orleans Jazz & Heritage Festival event with the Preservation Hall Jazz Band and My Morning Jacket, where the entire piece was performed acoustically and without the use of electricity.

The song has been performed by many artists, including Tom Sancton.
